= List of national museums =

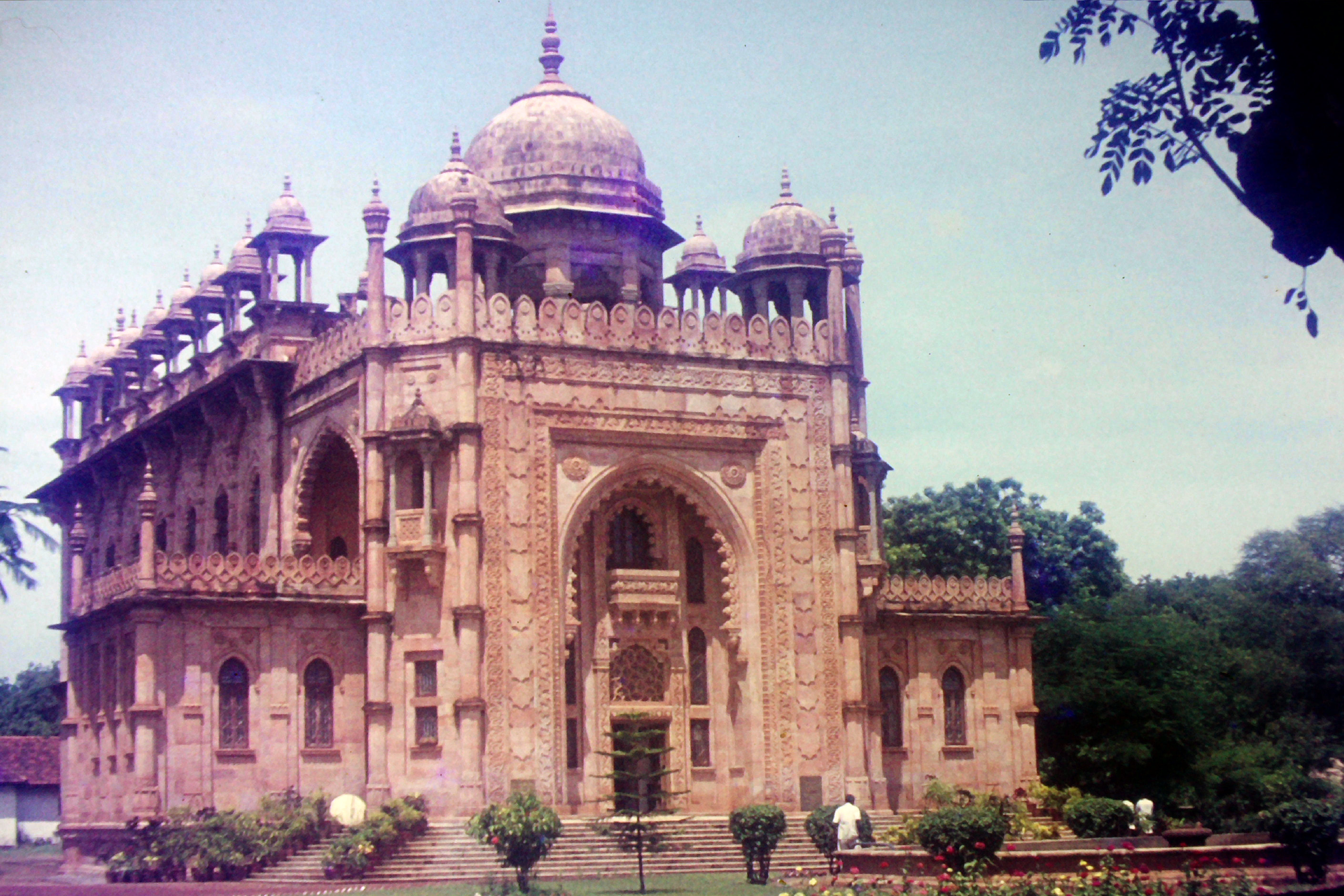
The Government Museum Complex in Chennai, which also houses the National Art Gallery and the Connemara Public Library

A national museum can be a museum maintained and funded by a national government. In many countries it denotes a museum run by the central government, while other museums are run by regional or local governments. In the United States, most national museums are privately funded and operated, but have been designated by Congress as national institutions that are important to the country. In other countries a much greater number of museums are run by the central government.

The following is an incomplete list of national museums:

== Afghanistan ==
- National Museum of Afghanistan

== Albania ==
The Albanian government operates several national museums, including:

- National History Museum (Albania)
- National Museum of Education (Albania)
- National Museum of Fine Arts (Albania)
- National Museum of Medieval Art (Albania)
- Marubi National Museum of Photography

== Algeria ==
- National Museum of Fine Arts of Algiers
- National Museum of Antiquities and Islamic Art

== Angola ==
- Museu Nacional de História Natural de Angola
- National Museum of Slavery

== Argentina ==
The Argentinian Ministry of Culture operates several national museums, including:

- Historical House of the Independence Museum
- Museo Casa de Rogelio Yrurtia
- Museo Mitre
- Museo Nacional de Bellas Artes (Buenos Aires)
- National Historical Museum (Argentina)
- National Museum of Decorative Arts
- National Museum of the Cabildo and the May Revolution
- Sarmiento Historical Museum

== Armenia ==
- History Museum of Armenia
- National Gallery of Armenia

== Australia ==
The Australian Government operates several national museums through its various departments, including:

- Australian National Maritime Museum
- Australian War Memorial
- National Gallery of Australia
- National Museum of Australia
- National Portrait Gallery (Australia)
- Questacon

In addition, a number of states in Australia also operate "national museums". These include:

- National Motor Museum, Birdwood, operated by the government of South Australia
- National Gallery of Victoria, operated by the government of Victoria

== Austria ==
- Kunsthistorisches Museum Vienna
- Natural History Museum, Vienna
- Museum of Military History, Vienna
- Österreichische Galerie Belvedere

== Azerbaijan ==
- National Art Museum of Azerbaijan
- National Museum of History of Azerbaijan

== Bahamas ==
- National Art Gallery of The Bahamas

== Bahrain ==
- Bahrain National Museum

== Bangladesh ==
- Bangladesh National Museum
- National Art Gallery (Bangladesh)
- National Museum of Science and Technology (Bangladesh)
- Bangladesh Military Museum

== Barbados ==
- Barbados Museum and Historical Society

== Belarus ==
- Belarusian National Arts Museum
- Belarusian National History Museum

== Belgium ==
The Federal Public Service for Science Policy Programming in Belgium operates several museum associations:

- Royal Museums of Art and History
- Royal Museums of Fine Arts of Belgium

== Belize ==
- Museum of Belize

== Bhutan ==
- National Museum of Bhutan

== Bolivia ==
- National Museum of Archaeology
- National Museum of Art
- National Natural History Museum

== Bosnia and Herzegovina ==
- Bosnian and Herzegovinian Museum of Literature
- Historical Museum of Bosnia and Herzegovina
- National Museum of Bosnia and Herzegovina

== Botswana ==
- Botswana National Museum

== Brazil ==
- National Historical Museum, Brazil (Museu Histórico Nacional)
- National Museum of Brazil (Museu Nacional)
- National Museum of Fine Arts (Museu Nacional de Belas Artes)
- National Museum of the Republic (Museu Nacional da República)

== Brunei ==
The government of Brunei operates several museums including:

- Brunei Museum
- Brunei Darussalam Maritime Museum
- Malay Technology Museum
- Royal Regalia Museum

== Bulgaria ==
- National Archaeological Museum
- National Historical Museum
- National Art Gallery
- National Gallery for Foreign Art
- National Museum of Natural History
- Earth and Man National Museum
- National Museum of Military History
- National Transport Museum

== Burkina Faso ==
- National Museum of Music

== Burundi ==
- National Museum of Gitega

== Cambodia ==
- National Museum of Cambodia
- Angkor National Museum

== Canada ==
The following are the ten national museums of Canada, established by the federal government of Canada and operated through various Crown corporations:

- Canada Agriculture and Food Museum
- Canada Aviation and Space Museum
- Canada Science and Technology Museum
- Canadian Museum for Human Rights
- Canadian Museum of History
- Canadian Museum of Immigration at Pier 21
- Canadian Museum of Nature
- Canadian War Museum
- National Gallery of Canada
- RCMP Heritage Centre

Former national museums that were later shut down includes:

- Canadian Museum of Contemporary Photography
- Canadian Postal Museum

In addition to institutions established or operated by the Government of Canada, several provinces and territories have established their own provincial and territorial museums.

== Central African Republic ==
- Boganda National Museum

== Chad ==
- Chad National Museum (Musee National N'Djamena)

== Chile ==
- National Air and Space Museum (Santiago)
- National History Museum
- National Museum of Fine Arts (Santiago)
- National Museum of Natural History (Santiago)

== China ==
- National Museum of China
- Palace Museum
- Military Museum of the Chinese People's Revolution
- National Art Museum of China

== Colombia ==
- National Museum of Colombia

== Comoros ==
- National Museum of Comoros

== Congo, Democratic Republic of the ==
- National Museum of the Democratic Republic of the Congo
- National Museum of Lubumbashi

== Costa Rica ==
- National Museum of Costa Rica

== Croatia ==
- Croatian History Museum

== Cuba ==
- Museo Nacional de Bellas Artes de La Habana
- Museo Nacional de Historia Natural Cubana

== Cyprus ==
- Cyprus Museum

== Czech Republic ==
- National Gallery Prague
- National Museum, Prague
- Prague Postal Museum

== Denmark ==
- Det Grønne Museum
- Hirschsprung Collection
- National Gallery of Denmark
- National Museum of Denmark
- Natural History Museum of Denmark
- Ordrupgaard

== Djibouti ==
- Djibouti Museum

== Dominica ==
- The Dominica Museum

== Dominican Republic ==
- Museum of the Dominican Man
- Memorial Museum of Dominican Resistance
- Museo del Ámbar Dominicano
- Trampoline Children's Museum
- Amber World Museum
- Alcázar de Colón
- Fortaleza San Luis
- Columbus Lighthouse
- Fortaleza San Felipe
- Museo Bellapart
- Museo de las Casas Reales

== Ecuador ==
- National Museum of Ecuador
- Museum of Anthropology and Contemporary Art
- Pumapungo Museum
- Alfaro City Civic Centre

== Egypt ==
- Grand Egyptian Museum
- National Museum of Egyptian Civilization
- Egyptian Museum
- Luxor Museum
- Alexandria National Museum
- Aswan Museum
- Nubian Museum
- Sharm El Sheikh Museum
- Hurghada Museum
- Imhotep Museum
- Museum of Islamic Art
- Coptic Museum
- Egyptian National Military Museum

== Eritrea ==
- National Museum of Eritrea

== Estonia ==
- Art Museum of Estonia
- Estonian National Museum
- Estonian History Museum

== Ethiopia ==
- National Museum of Ethiopia

== Fiji ==
- Fiji Museum

== Finland ==
- Ateneum
- Finnish Museum of Natural History
- Kiasma
- National Museum of Finland
- Sinebrychoff Art Museum

== France ==
- Musée du Louvre
  - Musée Delacroix
  - Louvre-Lens
- Musée d'Orsay
  - Musée de l'Orangerie
- Centre Georges Pompidou (Musée National d'Art Moderne)
  - Centre Pompidou-Metz
- Musée de l'Armée
- National Archaeological Museum, France
- National Museum of Prehistory
- Musée de Cluny - National Museum of the Middle-Ages (Musée National du Moyen-Age)
- Museum of European and Mediterranean Civilisations (MuCEM)
- Musée national de la Renaissance
- Musée du Quai Branly – Jacques Chirac
- Musée national des Monuments Français
- Musée Guimet
- Musée national de Céramique
- Musée national Adrien-Dubouché
- Musée Picasso
- Musée Rodin
- Musée Gustave Moreau
- Musée Camille Claudel
- Musée Magnin
- Musée de la Musique
- Cité nationale de l'histoire de l'immigration
- Muséum national d'histoire naturelle
- Museum of Air and Space (Musée de l'Air et de l'Espace)
- Museum of Natural History (Muséum national d'histoire naturelle)
- Museum of Science and Industry (Cité des Sciences et de l'Industrie)
- National Navy Museum (Musée national de la Marine)
  - Musée national de la Marine, Rochefort
- National Railway Museum (Musée Français du Chemin de Fer)
- Musée National de l'Automobile

== Gambia ==
- Gambia National Museum

== Georgia ==
- Georgian National Museum. Branches:
  - Simon Janashia Museum of Georgia, Tbilisi
  - Samtskhe-Javakheti History Museum, Akhaltsikhe
  - Open Air Museum of Ethnography, Tbilisi
  - Art Museum of Georgia, Tbilisi
  - Museum of the Soviet Occupation, Tbilisi
  - Dmanisi Museum-Reserve of History and Archaeology, Dmanisi
  - Vani Museum-Reserve of Archaeology, Vani
  - Museum of History of Tbilisi, Tbilisi
  - Museum of History and Ethnography of Svaneti, Mestia
  - Institute of Palaeobiology, Tbilisi
  - Sighnaghi Museum, Sighnaghi
  - Bolnisi Museum, Bolnisi
- Art Palace of Georgia - Museum of Cultural History

== Germany ==
- Bavarian National Museum
- German Historical Museum (National Historical Museum)
- German Museum of Technology (Deutsches Technikmuseum Berlin)
- German National Museum (Germanisches Nationalmuseum)
- Glyptothek
- The Max Planck Institutes
- Modern Art Museum (Pinakothek der Moderne)
- National Gallery
- Deutsches Museum
- New Pinakothek (Neue Pinakothek)
- Old Pinakothek (Alte Pinakothek)

== Ghana ==
- National Museum of Ghana

== Greece ==
- Athens War Museum
- National Archaeological Museum, Athens
- National Gallery
- National Historical Museum, Athens
- State Museum of Contemporary Arts

== Grenada ==
- Grenada National Museum

== Guatemala ==
- Museo Nacional de Arqueología y Etnología
- Guatemalan National History Museum
- Museo Nacional de Arte Moderno "Carlos Mérida"

== Guinea ==
- Sandervalia National Museum

== Guinea-Bissau ==
- National Ethnographic Museum

== Guyana ==
- National Museum of Guyana

== Haiti ==
- National Museum of Haiti

== Holy See (Vatican City) ==
- Vatican Museums
- Vatican Library
- Vatican Secret Archives
- Saint Peter's Basilica
- Apostolic Palace
- Archbasilica of Saint John Lateran
- Sistine Chapel

== Hong Kong ==
- Hong Kong Museum of Art
- Hong Kong Museum of History
- Hong Kong Heritage Museum
- Hong Kong Science Museum

== Hungary ==
- Hungarian National Museum
- Hungarian National Gallery
- Hungarian Natural History Museum
- Museum of Ethnography (Budapest)
- Museum of Fine Arts (Budapest)
- Semmelweis Museum of Medical History

== Iceland ==
- National Gallery of Iceland
- National Museum of Iceland

== Isle of Man ==
- Manx National Heritage (Eiraght Ashoonagh Vannin)

== India ==
National-level museums in India come directly under the administrative control of Ministry of Culture, Government of India.

- National Museum, New Delhi
- Chhatrapati Shivaji Maharaj Vastu Sangrahalaya
- Indian Museum
- Government Museum, Mathura
- National Gallery of Modern Art
- Allahabad Museum
- Government Museum, Chennai
- Salar Jung Museum
- Dr. Bhau Daji Lad Museum
- Government Museum and Art Gallery, Chandigarh
- City Palace, Jaipur
- City Palace, Udaipur
- National Handicrafts and Handlooms Museum
- Victoria Memorial
- Jaisalmer War Museum
- Hazarduari Palace
- Sabarmati Ashram
- Cavalry Tank Museum, Ahmednagar
- National Rail Museum, New Delhi
- Railway Museum, Mysore
- Albert Hall Museum
- Madame Tussauds Delhi
- 23 science centers under the National Council of Science Museums
- 44 site museums under the Archaeological Survey of India

== Indonesia ==
Museums listed below are operated by Ministry of Education, Culture, Research, and Technology and other ministries.

- National Museum of Indonesia
- Basoeki Abdullah Museum
- Formulation of Proclamation Text Museum
- Fort Vredeburg Museum
- Museum of National Awakening
- National Gallery of Indonesia
- National Press Monument
- Some government-operated museums in Taman Mini Indonesia Indah
- Youth Pledge Museum

== Iran ==
- Abgineh Museum of Tehran (Glassware and Ceramics Museum of Iran)
- Arg-é Bam
- Carpet Museum of Iran
- Golestan Palace
- Iranian National Museum of Medical Sciences History
- Malik National Museum of Iran
- Naghsh-i Jahan Square
- National Car Museum of Iran
- National Museum of Iran
- Niavaran Palace Complex
- Pars Museum of Shiraz
- Pearl Palace (Morvarid Palace)
- Reza Abbasi Museum
- Sadabad Palace

== Iraq ==
- National Museum of Iraq

== Ireland ==
- Irish Museum of Modern Art
- National Gallery of Ireland
- National Museum of Ireland. Branches:
  - National Museum of Ireland – Archaeology, Dublin
  - National Museum of Ireland – Decorative Arts and History, Dublin
  - National Museum of Ireland – Natural History, Dublin
  - National Museum of Ireland – Country Life, Turlough, County Mayo

== Israel ==
- Israel Museum

== Italy ==
- Bargello National Museum (Museo Nazionale del Bargello)
- Galleria degli Uffizi
- National Archeological Museum of Naples (Museo Archeologico Nazionale di Napoli)
- National Archaeological Museum of Nuoro
- National Etruscan Museum (Museo Nazionale Etrusco)
- National Gallery of Ancient Art (Galleria Nazionale d'Arte Antica)
- National Gallery of Modern Art (Galleria Nazionale d'Arte Moderna)
- National Museum of Capodimonte (Museo Nazionale di Capodimonte)
- National Museum of Magna Grecia (Museo Nazionale della Magna Grecia)
- National Museum of Oriental Art
- National Museum of Rome
- Pinacoteca di Brera

== Japan ==
- National Institutes for Cultural Heritage
  - Tokyo National Museum
  - Kyoto National Museum
  - Nara National Museum
  - Kyushu National Museum
- Independent Administrative Institution National Museum of Art
  - National Museum of Modern Art, Tokyo
  - National Museum of Modern Art, Kyoto
  - National Museum of Western Art
  - National Museum of Art, Osaka
  - National Art Center, Tokyo
  - National Film Archive of Japan
- National Museum of Nature and Science
- National Museum of Ethnology (Japan)
- National Museum of Japanese History
- National Showa Memorial Museum

== Jordan ==
- The Jordan Museum
- Jordan Archaeological Museum
- Jordan National Gallery of Fine Arts

== Kazakhstan ==
- National Museum of the Republic of Kazakhstan
- Central State Museum of Kazakhstan
- Kazakh Museum of Folk Musical Instruments
- A. Kasteyev State Museum of Arts
- Nature Museum of the Republic of Kazakhstan

== Kenya ==
- National Museums of Kenya

== Kiribati ==
- Te Umanibong

== North Korea ==
- Korean Central History Museum
- Korean Art Gallery

== South Korea ==
- National Folk Museum of Korea
- National Lighthouse Museum
- National Maritime Museum
- National Museum of Contemporary Art
- National Museum of Korea
  - Buyeo National Museum
  - Cheongju National Museum
  - Chuncheon National Museum
  - Daegu National Museum
  - Gimhae National Museum
  - Gongju National Museum
  - Gwangju National Museum
  - Gyeongju National Museum
  - Iksan National Museum
  - Jeju National Museum
  - Jeonju National Museum
  - Jinju National Museum
- National Museum of Korean Contemporary History
- National Museum of Modern and Contemporary Art
- National Museum of World Writing Systems
- National Palace Museum of Korea
- National Science Museum
  - Gwacheon National Science Museum
  - National Science Museum Maglev
- War Memorial of Korea

== Kosovo ==
- Kosovo Museum

== Kuwait ==
- Al-Hashemi-II Marine Museum
- Kuwait National Museum
- Kuwait Science and Natural History Museum

== Kyrgyzstan ==
- Kyrgyz State Historical Museum

== Laos ==
- Lao National Museum

== Latvia ==
- Latvian National Museum of Art
- Latvian National Museum of History

== Lebanon ==
- National Museum of Beirut

== Liberia ==
- Liberian National Museum

== Libya ==
- Red Castle Museum
- Museum of Libya

== Liechtenstein ==
- Liechtenstein National Museum

== Lithuania ==
- National Museum of Lithuania
- Lithuanian National Museum of Art
- Vytautas the Great War Museum

== Luxembourg ==
- National Museum of History and Art, Luxembourg City
- National Museum of Military History, Diekirch
- National Museum of Natural History, Luxembourg City

== Macau ==
- Museum of Macau

== Malawi ==
- Chichiri Museum

== Malaysia ==
- Muzium Negara
- National Art Gallery (Malaysia)

== Maldives ==
- National Museum

== Mali ==
- National Museum of Mali

== Malta ==
- National Museum of Archaeology
- National Museum of Ethnography
- National Museum of Fine Arts
- National Museum of Natural History
- National War Museum

== Marshall Islands ==
- Alele Museum & Public Library

== Mauritania ==
- National Museum of Mauritania

== Mexico ==
- Museo Nacional de Antropología (National Museum of Anthropology)
- Museo Nacional de Historia (National Museum of History)
- Museo Nacional de Arte (National Museum of Art)
- Museo Nacional de las Culturas (National Museum of Cultures)
- Museo Nacional de las Intervenciones (National Museum of the Interventions)
- Museo Nacional del Virreinato (National Museum of the Viceroyalty)

== Moldova ==
- National Museum of History of Moldova
- National Museum of Fine Arts, Chișinău

== Monaco ==
- New National Museum of Monaco

== Mongolia ==
- National Museum of Mongolia
- Mongolian Natural History Museum
- Chinggis Khaan National Museum

== Montenegro ==
- National Museum of Montenegro

== Morocco ==
- Rabat Archaeological Museum

== Myanmar ==
- National Museum Nay Pyi Taw
- National Museum of Myanmar

== Namibia ==
- National Museum of Namibia
  - Alte Feste
  - Owela Museum
- Independence Memorial Museum

== Nauru ==
- Nauru Museum

== Nepal ==
- National Museum of Nepal

== Netherlands ==
- Dordrechts Museum
- EYE Film Institute Netherlands
- Huis Doorn
- Kröller-Müller Museum
- Loevestein
- Mauritshuis
- Muiderslot
- Museum Boerhaave
- Museum Catharijneconvent
- Museum Meermanno
- Museum Mesdag
- National Museum of Ethnology
- Naturalis
- Nederlands Scheepvaartmuseum
- Paleis het Loo
- Rijksmuseum Amsterdam
- Rijksmuseum Twenthe
- Rijksmuseum van Oudheden
- Openluchtmuseum
- Van Gogh Museum
- Zuiderzeemuseum

== New Zealand ==
- Museum of New Zealand Te Papa Tongarewa - commonly known as Te Papa or Our Place in English translation

== Niger ==
- Musée National Boubou Hama, formerly National Museum of Niger

== Nigeria ==
- Nigerian National Museum
- Benin City National Museum
- Ife National Museum
- Esiẹ Museum

== North Macedonia ==
- Museum of the Republic of North Macedonia
- National Gallery
- Museum of the Macedonian Struggle (Skopje)
- Museum of Contemporary Art (Skopje)

== Norway ==
- National Museum of Art, Architecture and Design

== Oman ==
- National Museum

== Pakistan ==
- National Museum of Pakistan, Karachi
- Pakistan Museum of Natural History, Islamabad
- National Art Gallery, Islamabad
- Lok Virsa Museum, Islamabad

== Palau ==
- Belau National Museum

== Panama ==
- Museum of History of Panama

== Papua New Guinea ==
- Papua New Guinea National Museum and Art Gallery

== Paraguay ==
- Museo Nacional de Bellas Artes de Asunción

== Peru ==
- National Museum of Peru
- Museum of the Nation
- National Museum of the Archaeology, Anthropology, and History of Peru
- Lima Art Museum

== Philippines ==
The National Museum of the Philippines (NMP), a government organization, operates several national museums, including:

The National Museum Complex in Manila which consists of the central museums of the NMP namely the:

- National Museum of Anthropology
- National Museum of Fine Arts
- National Museum of Natural History

The NMP also operates the following satellite museums:

- National Museum Dumaguete
- National Museum Western Visayas
- National Museum Cordillera
- National Museum Ilocos
- National Museum Cagayan Valley
- National Museum Bicol
- National Museum Eastern-Northern Mindanao
- National Museum Western-Southern Mindanao
- National Museum Batanes
- National Museum Marinduque-Romblon
- National Museum Bohol
- National Museum Sulu
- National Museum Kabayan
- National Museum Tabon Caves Site Museum
- National Museum Angono-Binangonan

== Poland ==
- National Museum, Kraków
- National Museum, Gdańsk
- National Maritime Museum, Gdańsk
- National Museum, Lublin
- National Museum, Poznań
- National Museum, Szczecin
- National Museum, Warsaw
- National Museum, Wrocław

== Portugal ==
- Air Museum, part of the Portuguese Air Force
- Grão Vasco National Museum
- Porto Military Museum, part of the Portuguese Army
- National Archaeology Museum
- National Azulejo Museum
- National Coach Museum
- National Museum of Ancient Art
- National Museum of Contemporary Art of Chiado
- National Museum of Costume and Fashion
- National Museum of Ethnology, it includes the Popular Art Museum
- National Museum of Natural History and Science, part of the University of Lisbon
- National Museum Machado de Castro
- National Museum Soares dos Reis
- National Music Museum
- National Railway Museum
- National Theatre and Dance Museum
- Navy Museum, part of the Portuguese Navy

== Qatar ==
- Qatar National Museum

== Romania ==
- ASTRA Museum of Traditional Folk Civilization (Muzeul Civilizaţiei Populare Tradiţionale)
- ASTRA Museum of Transylvanian Civilisation (Muzeul Civilizaţiei Transilvane)
- Brukenthal National Museum
- Emil Sigerus Museum of Saxon Ethnography and Folk Art (Muzeul de Etnografie şi Artă Populară Săsească ASTRA)
- Franz Binder Museum of Universal Ethnography (Muzeul de Etnografie Universală ASTRA)
- National History Museum of Romania
- National Military Museum, Romania (Muzeul Militar Naţional)
- National Museum of Art of Romania

== Russia ==
- Hermitage Museum
- State Historical Museum
- Russian Museum
- Tretyakov Gallery
- Pushkin Museum
- Moscow Kremlin Museums
- State Museum of Oriental Art
- Central Armed Forces Museum
- Museum of Political History of Russia
- Shchusev Museum of Architecture
- Vernadsky State Geological Museum

== Rwanda ==
- Ethnographic Museum

== Saint Kitts and Nevis ==
- National Museum of Saint Kitts

== Samoa ==
- Falemata'aga - Museum of Samoa

== Saudi Arabia ==
- National Museum of Saudi Arabia

== Senegal ==
- Museum of Black Civilisations
- Historical Museum of Senegal in Gorée

== Serbia ==
- National Museum of Serbia
- Historical Museum of Serbia

== Sierra Leone ==
- Sierra Leone National Museum

== Singapore ==
- National Museum of Singapore
- National Gallery Singapore

== Slovakia ==
- Slovak National Museum
- Slovak National History Museum
- Slovak National Gallery

== Slovenia ==
- National Museum of Slovenia
- National Gallery of Slovenia

== Solomon Islands ==
- Solomon Islands National Museum

== Somalia ==
- National Museum of Somalia

== South Africa ==
- South African National Museum of Military History
- Iziko South African Museum
- Ditsong Museums of South Africa
  - includes Ditsong National Museum of Natural History and Ditsong National Museum of Cultural History
- National Museum, Bloemfontein
- National Afrikaans Literary Museum and Research Centre

== South Sudan ==
- South Sudan National Museum

== Spain ==
- National Archaeological Museum, Madrid
- Cervantes' House Museum, Valladolid
- Museum of the Royal Mint, Madrid
- Museum Cerralbo, Madrid
- Aeronautical and Astronautical Museum, Madrid
- Museum of the Americas, Madrid
- Museum of the Army, Toledo
- Catalonia Railway Museum, Vilanova i la Geltrú (Barcelona)
- Railway Museum, Madrid
- El Greco Museum, Toledo
- National Museum of Romanticism, Madrid
- Museum of Garment - Ethnologic Heritage Research Center, Madrid
- Geomineral Museum, Madrid
- Lázaro Galdiano Museum, Madrid
- Queen Sofía Art Center National Museum, Madrid
- National Museum of Anthropology, Madrid
- National Museum of Subaquatic Archaeology, Cartagena (Murcia)
- National Museum of Roman Art, Mérida (Badajoz)
- National Museum of Decorative Arts, Madrid
- González Martí National Museum of Ceramics and Decorative Arts, Valencia
- National Museum of Science and Technology, La Coruña and Alcobendas (Madrid)
- National Museum of Natural Sciences, Madrid
- National Museum of Sculpture, Valladolid
- Prado National Museum, Madrid
- National Museum of Theatre, Almagro (Ciudad Real)
- Thyssen-Bornemisza National Museum, Madrid
- National Museum and Research Center of Altamira, Santillana del Mar (Cantabria)
- Naval Museum, Madrid
- Sephardic Museum, Toledo
- Sorolla Museum, Madrid
- Royal Botanical Garden, Madrid

=== Catalonia ===
- National Art Museum of Catalonia (MNAC), Barcelona
- National Museum of Science and Industry of Catalonia (mNACTEC), Terrassa
- Archaeological Museum of Catalonia (MAC), Barcelona, Empúries, Girona, Olèrdola and Ullastret

== Sri Lanka ==
- National Museum of Colombo
- National Museum Galle
- National Museum Kandy
- National Museum Maritime
- National Museum Ratnapura

== Sudan ==
- National Museum of Sudan

== Suriname ==
- Surinaams Museum

== Sweden ==
- Nationalmuseum

== Switzerland ==
- Swiss National Museum (Landesmuseum)

== Syria ==
- National Museum of Damascus
- National Museum of Aleppo

== Taiwan ==
- Chunghwa Postal Museum
- National Museum of History
- National Museum of Marine Biology and Aquarium
- National Museum of Marine Science and Technology
- National Museum of Natural Science
- National Museum of Prehistory
- National Museum of Taiwan History
- National Museum of Taiwan Literature
- National Palace Museum
- National Radio Museum
- National Science and Technology Museum
- National Taiwan Museum
- National Taiwan Museum of Fine Arts
- Republic of China Air Force Museum
- Republic of China Armed Forces Museum
- Southern Branch of the National Palace Museum

== Tajikistan ==
- National Museum of Antiquities of Tajikistan
- Tajikistan National Museum

== Tanzania ==
- National Museum of Tanzania

== Togo ==
- Togo National Museum

== Tonga ==
- Tonga National Museum

== Trinidad and Tobago ==
- National Museum and Art Gallery

== Tunisia ==
- Bardo National Museum
- Carthage National Museum

== Turkey ==
- Museum of Anatolian Civilizations
- Republic Museum
- State Art and Sculpture Museum
- Ethnography Museum of Ankara
- War of Independence Museum
- Istanbul Archaeology Museums
- Turkish and Islamic Arts Museum
- Istanbul Aviation Museum
- Istanbul Naval Museum
- Istanbul Military Museum

== Turkmenistan ==
- Ashgabat National Museum of History
- The State Museum of the State Cultural Center of Turkmenistan
- Turkmen Museum of Fine Arts

== Turks and Caicos ==
- Turks and Caicos National Museum

== Uganda ==
- Uganda Museum

== Ukraine ==
- Aivazovsky National Art Gallery
- Lviv National Art Gallery
- Lviv National Museum
- Museum of The History of Ukraine in World War II
- National Art Museum of Ukraine
- National Museum of the History of Ukraine
- National Museum-Preserve "Battle for Kyiv 1943"
- Ukrainian National Chornobyl Museum

== United Arab Emirates ==
- Al Ain National Museum
- National Museum of Ras Al Khaimah
- Dubai Museum
- Etihad Museum
- Emirates National Auto Museum

== United Kingdom ==
=== England ===
Sponsored by the Department for Culture, Media and Sport

- British Museum
- Victoria & Albert Museum
  - Victoria and Albert Museum in London
  - V&A Museum of Childhood in London
  - Also see 'Scotland' below
- Horniman Museum and Gardens
- Imperial War Museum
  - Imperial War Museum London
  - Imperial War Museum Duxford
  - HMS Belfast (C35)
  - Churchill War Rooms
  - Imperial War Museum North
- National Museums Liverpool
  - World Museum
  - Walker Art Gallery
  - Merseyside Maritime Museum
  - The Piermaster's House
  - International Slavery Museum
  - Lady Lever Art Gallery
  - Sudley House
  - Museum of Liverpool
  - National Conservation Centre
- Royal Armouries
  - Royal Armouries Museum in Leeds
  - Tower of London in London
  - Fort Nelson in Portsmouth
- Science Museum Group
  - The Science Museum in South Kensington, London
  - The Science and Industry Museum in Manchester
  - The National Railway Museum in York
  - The National Railway Museum Shildon in County Durham ("Locomotion")
  - The National Science and Media Museum (formerly the National Museum of Photography, Film and Television) in Bradford, and
  - The Science Museum at Wroughton in Swindon, Wiltshire.
- Sir John Soane's Museum
- Tate
- The Box, Plymouth in Plymouth, Devon
- Wallace Collection
- Natural History Museum, London
  - Natural History Museum at Tring, Tring
- Geffrye Museum
- National Coal Mining Museum for England, Wakefield
- National Gallery
- National Portrait Gallery
- Royal Museums Greenwich

Sponsored by Ministry of Defence

- National Army Museum
- National Museum of the Royal Navy
- Royal Air Force Museum

Sponsored by the Home Office

- Border Force National Museum

=== Northern Ireland ===
- Armagh County Museum
- Ulster-American Folk Park
- Ulster Folk and Transport Museum
- Ulster Museum

=== Scotland ===
- National Museums Scotland
- National Museum of Costume
- National Museum of Flight
- National Museum of Rural Life
- National War Museum of Scotland
- Museum of Scotland
- Royal Museum
- V&A Dundee

=== Wales ===
- Big Pit National Coal Museum
- National Museum Cardiff
- National Museum Wales
- National Roman Legionary Museum
- National Slate Museum
- National Waterfront Museum
- National Woollen Museum
- St Fagans National History Museum

== United States ==
- Atomic/Nuclear
  - American Museum of Science and Energy
  - National Atomic Testing Museum
  - National Museum of Nuclear Science & History
- Department of Defense:
  - Air Force:
    - Air Force Armament Museum
    - Air Mobility Command Museum
    - National Museum of the United States Air Force
    - Museum of Aviation
    - Strategic Air and Space Museum
  - Army:
    - National Museum of Health and Medicine
    - National Museum of the United States Army
    - Rock Island Arsenal Museum
    - West Point Museum
  - Navy:
    - National Museum of the Marine Corps
    - National Museum of the United States Navy
    - National Naval Aviation Museum
    - National Museum of the American Sailor
    - National Navy UDT-SEAL Museum
    - Naval War College Museum
    - Submarine Force Library and Museum
  - National Security Agency:
    - National Cryptologic Museum
  - National Museum of Intelligence and Special Operations
- Central Intelligence Agency:
  - CIA Museum
- Department of Homeland Security
  - National Coast Guard Museum
- National Gallery of Art
- Smithsonian Institution:
  - American Art Museum
  - Anacostia Community Museum
  - Arts and Industries Building
  - Cooper Hewitt, Smithsonian Design Museum
  - Hirshhorn Museum and Sculpture Garden
  - National Air and Space Museum
    - Steven F. Udvar-Hazy Center
  - National Museum of African American History and Culture
  - National Museum of African Art
  - National Museum of the American Indian
  - National Museum of American History
  - National Museum of Asian Art
    - Arthur M. Sackler Gallery
    - Freer Gallery of Art
  - National Museum of Natural History
  - National Portrait Gallery
  - National Postal Museum
  - National Zoological Park
- Presidential library system
  - Herbert Hoover Presidential Library and Museum
  - Franklin D. Roosevelt Presidential Library and Museum
  - Harry S. Truman Presidential Library and Museum
  - Dwight D. Eisenhower Presidential Library, Museum and Boyhood Home
  - John F. Kennedy Presidential Library and Museum
  - Lyndon Baines Johnson Library and Museum
  - Richard Nixon Presidential Library and Museum
  - Gerald R. Ford Museum
  - Jimmy Carter Library and Museum
  - Ronald Reagan Presidential Library
  - George H. W. Bush Presidential Library and Museum
  - Clinton Presidential Center
  - George W. Bush Presidential Center
- Transportation
  - Mariners' Museum and Park - National Maritime Museum
  - National Railroad Museum
  - National Museum of Railroad History & Innovation
  - South Street Seaport Museum - National Maritime Museum
- War Museums/Memorials
  - National Veterans Memorial and Museum
  - National Civil War Museum
  - National Museum of American Jewish Military History
  - National Museum of the Pacific War
  - National Museum of World War II Aviation
  - National World War I Museum
  - National World War II Museum
- Other
  - National Airmail Museum
  - National American Museum of Visionary Art
  - National Aquarium
  - National Building Museum
  - National Children’s Museum
  - National Civil Rights Museum
  - National Comedy Center
  - National Constitution Center
  - National George C. Marshall Museum and Library
  - National Law Enforcement Museum
  - National Mining Hall of Fame and Museum
  - National Museum of Dentistry
  - National Museum of Industrial History
  - National Museum of Wildlife Art
  - National Nordic Museum
  - National Quilt Museum
  - National Maritime Museum of the Gulf of Mexico

== Uruguay ==
- National Museum of Visual Arts (Uruguay)
- National Museum of Natural History, Uruguay

== Uzbekistan ==
- State Museum of History of Uzbekistan
- Art Gallery of Uzbekistan
- Museum of Arts of Uzbekistan
- State Museum of Nature of Uzbekistan
- State Museum of History of Culture of Uzbekistan
- Nukus Museum of Art

== Vanuatu ==
- National Museum of Vanuatu

== Venezuela ==
- National Art Gallery (Caracas)

== Vietnam ==
- Vietnam National Museum of History
- Vietnam National Museum of Fine Arts
- Vietnam Military History Museum
- Ho Chi Minh City Museum of History

== Yemen ==
- National Museum of Yemen

== Zambia ==
- Lusaka National Museum

== Zimbabwe ==
- National Gallery of Zimbabwe
- Natural History Museum of Zimbabwe
- Zimbabwe Museum of Human Sciences

== See also ==
- List of museums
- List of national archives
- List of national libraries
- List of national galleries
