= List of museums in South Korea =

There are over 500 museums and galleries in South Korea.

== National museums ==
Museum	City	Website
Buyeo National Museum	Buyeo, South Chungcheong Province	https://web.archive.org/web/20160229220412/http://buyeo.museum.go.kr/
Cheongju National Museum	Cheongju, North Chungcheong Province	https://web.archive.org/web/20080329010606/http://cheongju.museum.go.kr/
Chuncheon National Museum	Chuncheon	https://web.archive.org/web/20050629090403/http://chuncheon.museum.go.kr/
Daegu National Museum	Hwanggeum-dong, Suseong District, Daegu	https://web.archive.org/web/20071212084833/http://daegu.museum.go.kr/
Gimhae National Museum	Gimhae, South Gyeongsang Province	https://web.archive.org/web/20080409153146/http://gimhae.museum.go.kr/
Gongju National Museum	Gongju, South Chungcheong Province	https://web.archive.org/web/20071214032958/http://gongju.museum.go.kr/
Gyeongju National Museum	Gyeongju, North Gyeongsang Province	https://web.archive.org/web/20100207134614/http://gyeongju.museum.go.kr/
Gwangju National Museum	Gwangju	https://web.archive.org/web/20071217205203/http://gwangju.museum.go.kr/
Iksan National Museum	Iksan, North Jeolla Province	https://web.archive.org/web/20110303182845/http://www.mireuksaji.org/
Jeonju National Museum	Jeonju, North Jeolla Province	https://web.archive.org/web/20060829201307/http://jeonju.museum.go.kr/
Jeju National Museum	Jeju City	https://web.archive.org/web/20071212084841/http://jeju.museum.go.kr/
Jinju National Museum	Jinju, South Gyeongsang Province	https://web.archive.org/web/20071212084905/http://jinju.museum.go.kr/
Korea National Arboretum, South Korea		https://web.archive.org/web/20070902002437/http://www.koreaplants.go.kr:9300/
National Lighthouse Museum		http://www.lighthouse-museum.or.kr
National Museum of Contemporary Art	Gwacheon	http://www.moca.go.kr
National Agricultural Museum of Korea	Suwon, Gyeonggi Province	https://namuk.or.kr
National Folk Museum of Korea	Gyeongbokgung, Seoul	https://web.archive.org/web/20071226145052/http://www.nfm.go.kr/
National Map Museum of Korea	Suwon, Gyeonggi Province	https://www.ngii.go.kr/mapen/main.do
National Maritime Museum, South Korea	Dongsam-dong, Yeongdo District, Busan	https://web.archive.org/web/20120718191918/http://www.nmm.go.kr/english/
National Museum of Korea	Yongsan-dong, Yongsan District, Seoul	http://www.museum.go.kr/
National Museum of Modern and Contemporary Art	Seoul	http://www.mmca.go.kr
National Museum of World Writing Systems	Incheon	https://mow.or.kr/kor/index.do
National Palace Museum of Korea	Deoksugung, Seoul	http://www.gogung.go.kr
National Science Museum, South Korea	Daejeon	http://www.science.go.kr

== Provincial and private museums ==
Museum	Location	WEB
Museum of Musical Instruments of the World	Youngwol, Gangwon–Do	http://www.e-musictour.com
Aerospace Museum		http://aerospacemuseum.co.kr
Andong Folk Museum		https://web.archive.org/web/20180330014509/http://www.adfm.or.kr/
Andong - Soju & Traditional Food Museum		https://web.archive.org/web/20140517013820/http://andongsoju.net/
Artsonje Museum		http://www.artsonje.org
Banglimwon		http://banglimwon.com
Bokcheon Museum		https://bcmuseum.busan.go.kr
Boryeong Coal Museum		https://web.archive.org/web/20060205005820/http://1stcoal.go.kr/
Buchon Natural Ecology Museum		
Busan Modern History Museum		https://web.archive.org/web/20140531092029/http://modern.busan.go.kr/main/
Busan Museum		https://web.archive.org/web/20071212132430/http://museum.busan.kr/
Bucheon Museum of Education		http://www.bcmuseum.or.kr
Bucheon Museum of Suseok		http://www.bcmuseum.or.kr
Changyeong Museum		https://web.archive.org/web/20070819112110/http://www.cng.go.kr/
Charmsori Gramophone & Edison Museum		http://www.edison.kr
Cheongju Early Printing Museum		https://web.archive.org/web/20071212193916/http://www.jikjiworld.net/, www.digitaljikji.net
Cheongju Historic Museum of Baekje		http://www.cjbaekje.net
Cheongju Oengki Museum		
Chiak Folk Museum		https://web.archive.org/web/20060215171439/http://chiakmuseum.sangji.ac.kr/
Chocolate Museum (Jejudo)		http://www.chocolatemuseum.org
Chungju Museum		
Currency Museum (South Korea)		http://museum.komsco.com/eng
Cyan Museum		https://web.archive.org/web/20140517073317/http://cyanmuseum.org/
Daecheong Dam Water Culture Center		https://web.archive.org/web/20050424161041/http://daecheong.kowaco.or.kr/
Daegwallyeong Museum		https://web.archive.org/web/20070827213446/http://www.daegwallyeongmuseum.go.kr/
Daehan Textbook Museum		https://web.archive.org/web/20071221043123/http://www.textbookmuseum.com/
Daejeon Art Museum	Mannyeon-dong, Seo District, Daejeon	https://web.archive.org/web/20021126152419/http://dmma.metro.daejeon.kr/
DaeSeong-Dong Tombs Museum		https://web.archive.org/web/20130121184055/http://ds.gsiseol.or.kr/
Daewonsa Tibetan-Buddhism Museum		http://www.tibetan-museum.org
Dangrim Art Museum		
Dasan Art Museum		https://web.archive.org/web/20080131201739/http://www.dasan-art.com/
Deorimi Art Museum		
Dokdo Museum	Ulleung County, North Gyeongsang Province	https://web.archive.org/web/20110728074807/http://www.dokdomuseum.go.kr/
Donghak Peasant Revolution Museum	Jeongeup, North Jeolla Province	http://www.1894.or.kr/eng/
Dongjin Irrigation and Folk Museum		http://www.ekr.or.kr
European Porcelain Museum		http://www.bcmuseum.or.kr
Dongsan Pottery Museum		https://web.archive.org/web/20081120180434/http://www.dongsanmuseum.org/
Gachon Museum		http://www.gcmuseum.org
Galchon Tal Museum		https://web.archive.org/web/20060906084511/http://galchontal.or.kr/
Goryeo Celadon Museum	Cheongjachon-gil, Daegu-myeon, Gangjin County, South Jeolla Province	https://web.archive.org/web/20071024160146/http://www.celadon.go.kr/
Geoje Folk Museum		
Geoje Museum		http://www.kojemuseum.org
Geumo Folk Museum		https://web.archive.org/web/20140517104511/http://geumofm.net/
Gongju Folkdrama Museum		http://www.kfdm.net
Goseong Dinosaur Museum		http://www.goseong.go.kr
Gyung-Bo Fossil Museum		https://web.archive.org/web/20071201021415/http://www.hwasuk.org/
Gyeryongsan Natural History Museum		krnamu.or.kr
Gwangju Art Museum		https://web.archive.org/web/20081119022603/http://artmuse.gjcity.net/
Haegang Ceramics Museum	Icheon, Gyeonggi Province	http://haegang.org
Haegeumgang Theme Museum		http://www.hggmuseum.com
Haeinsa Museum		
Hahoe Mask Museum		http://www.maskmuseum.com
Hanbat Museum of Education		http://hbem.or.kr
Handok Medico-Pharmna Museum		email:quaejung.kim@aventis.com
Hankwang Art Museum		http://www.asiaart.co.kr/index.php
Hengso Museum		https://web.archive.org/web/20140517153008/http://hengsomuseum.com/
Jeju Shinyoung Cinema Museum		https://web.archive.org/web/20071207014147/http://www.jejuscm.co.kr/
Hamel Museum	Yeosu, South Jeolla Province	
Hyangam Museum		https://web.archive.org/web/20031219161953/http://www.hyangam.org/
Incheon Children's Museum		http://www.enjoymuseum.org
Incheon Metropolitan City Museum		https://web.archive.org/web/20170507210021/http://museum.inpia.net/
Independence Hall of Korea	Cheonan, South Chungcheong Province	https://web.archive.org/web/20070729115602/http://www.i815.or.kr/
Iron Museum		
Jangsaengpo Whale Museum	Jangsaengpo, Nam District, Ulsan	https://web.archive.org/web/20140516220241/http://whalemuseum.go.kr/
Jeju-do Folklore & Natural History Museum		https://web.archive.org/web/20071213002703/http://museum.jeju.go.kr/
Jeju Education Museum		http://www.jjemuseum.go.kr
Jeju Folk Museum		
Jeju Folk Village Museum		http://www.chejufolk.co.kr
Jeju Geum-o-dang Art Museum		
Jeju Teddy Bear Museum		http://www.teddybearmuseum.com
Jeollanamdo Agricultural Museum		https://web.archive.org/web/20071010122001/http://www.jam.go.kr/
Jeongju Historical Museum		http://www.jeonjumuseum.org
Jikji Museum of Buddhist Arts		http://www.jikjimuseum.org
Jincheon Bell Museum		
Junwon Art Museum		https://web.archive.org/web/20070109022229/http://www.junwon-art-museum.com/
K Pop Museum	Gyeongju, North Gyeongsang Province	http://kpopmuseum.com/eng/
Korea Comics Museum		http://www.comicsmuseum.org
Korea Silk Museum		http://www.silktopia.or.kr
Kyungpook National University Museum		http://museum.knu.ac.kr/
Kwangju Folk Museum		https://web.archive.org/web/20071109151835/http://www.kwangjufolk.go.kr/
Liquorium		http://www.liquorium.com
Manhae Museum	Hongseong, South Chungcheong Province	http://www.manhae.or.kr
Manhae Museum		https://archive.today/20130615093038/http://www.manmhae.net/
Miribeol Folk Museum		https://web.archive.org/web/20140517165437/http://miribeol.org/
Miryang Municipal Museum		http://www.miryang.go.kr
Mu Leung Museum		http://www.wmum.net
Mungyeongsaejae Museum		https://web.archive.org/web/20070612134727/http://www.mgsj.go.kr/
Mungyong Coal Museum	Mungyeong, North Gyeongsang Province	https://web.archive.org/web/20040322052451/http://coal.go.kr/
Museum of African Art, South Korea	Seogwipo, Jeju Province	http://www.africamuseum.or.kr
Museum of cadastre and Local History		http://www.forjijeok.com
Museum of Korean Culture	Incheon International Airport	
Museum of Natural Dye Art		https://web.archive.org/web/20140517195519/http://naturaldyeing.net/
Museum of Won Buddhism History		http://www.wonmuseum.net
Naju pear Museum	Naju	https://web.archive.org/web/20070928215726/http://www.naju.go.kr/
Nampo Art Gallery		http://www.nampoart.co.kr
Nangye Jorean Classical Music Museum		https://web.archive.org/web/20040412114725/http://www.nangye-museum.or.kr/
Nexon Computer Museum		http://www.nexoncomputermuseum.org
Ojukheon & Gangneung Municipal Museum		https://web.archive.org/web/20120727171242/http://www.ojukheon.or.kr/
okgwa Art Museum		http://www.okart.org
On Yang Folk Museum		http://www.onyangmuseum.or.kr
O'sulloc Tea House Museum		http://www.osulloc.co.kr
Pan Asia Paper Museum		http://www.papermuseum.co.kr
The POSCO Museum	Pohang	http://museum.posco.co.kr
PODO Museum	Jeju Province	http://podomuseum.com
Samcheok Municipal Museum		https://web.archive.org/web/20180424044135/http://scm.go.kr/
Sculpture Park of Keumkuwon		http://www.keumkuwon.org
Seogwipo Citrus Museum		http://citrus.seogwipo.go.kr/
Shin Museum of Art		http://shinmuseum.org
Songgwangmae Memorial Museum		https://web.archive.org/web/20090908040000/http://www.skmuseum.com/
Sound Island Museum		https://web.archive.org/web/20071010020025/http://www.sorisummuseum.com/
Space Mom Museum		
Sudeoksa Museum		https://web.archive.org/web/20070525220211/http://www.sudeokmuseum.org/
Sunwha Christian Museum of Art		https://web.archive.org/web/20081001203517/http://www.sunwha.or.kr/
Taebaek Coal Museum		https://web.archive.org/web/20071025025353/http://coalmuseum.or.kr/
Taeyeong Folk Museum		https://web.archive.org/web/20051220032955/http://tfmuseum.org/
Tongdosa Museum		https://web.archive.org/web/20051216085755/http://www.tongdosamuseum.or.kr/
Ui-Jae Art Museum		http://www.ujam.org
Uiryong Museum		
Ulsan Museum	Nam District, Ulsan	https://web.archive.org/web/20140809070219/http://museum.ulsan.go.kr/
Ulsan Science Museum	Nam District, Ulsan	http://www.usm.go.kr
Woljeongsa Museum		http://www.woljeongsa.org
Woodblock Prints Museum		https://web.archive.org/web/20070301200425/http://www.gopanhwa.or.kr/
Woojaegil Art Museum		https://web.archive.org/web/20141218175139/http://wooart.co.kr/
Woongjin Education Museum		https://web.archive.org/web/20060629235740/http://www.wjem.or.kr/
Yanggu Prehistoric Museum		http://www.yanggu.go.kr
Yeo Jin Budda Gallery		http://www.yeojinggallery.com%5B%5D
Yeongi Folk Museum		email:yghMuseum@hanmir.com
Yong-il Folk Museum		
Youngwol Book Museum		https://web.archive.org/web/20071117194452/http://www.bookmuseum.co.kr/

== See also ==
- Architecture of South Korea
- List of South Korean tourist attractions
- List of tallest buildings in Seoul
