= National Ethnographic Museum =

National Ethnographic Museum may refer to:

- National Ethnographic Museum (Berat), Albania
- National Ethnographic Museum (Guinea-Bissau)
