= National Lighthouse Museum =

National Lighthouse Museum may refer to:

- National Lighthouse Museum (New York City), New York, United States
- National Lighthouse Museum, Pohang, South Korea
- Trinity House National Lighthouse Museum, a defunct museum in Penzance, England
