= National Museum of the Comoros =

Museum in Comoros

Coordinates: 11°42′11.5″S 43°15′20.1″E

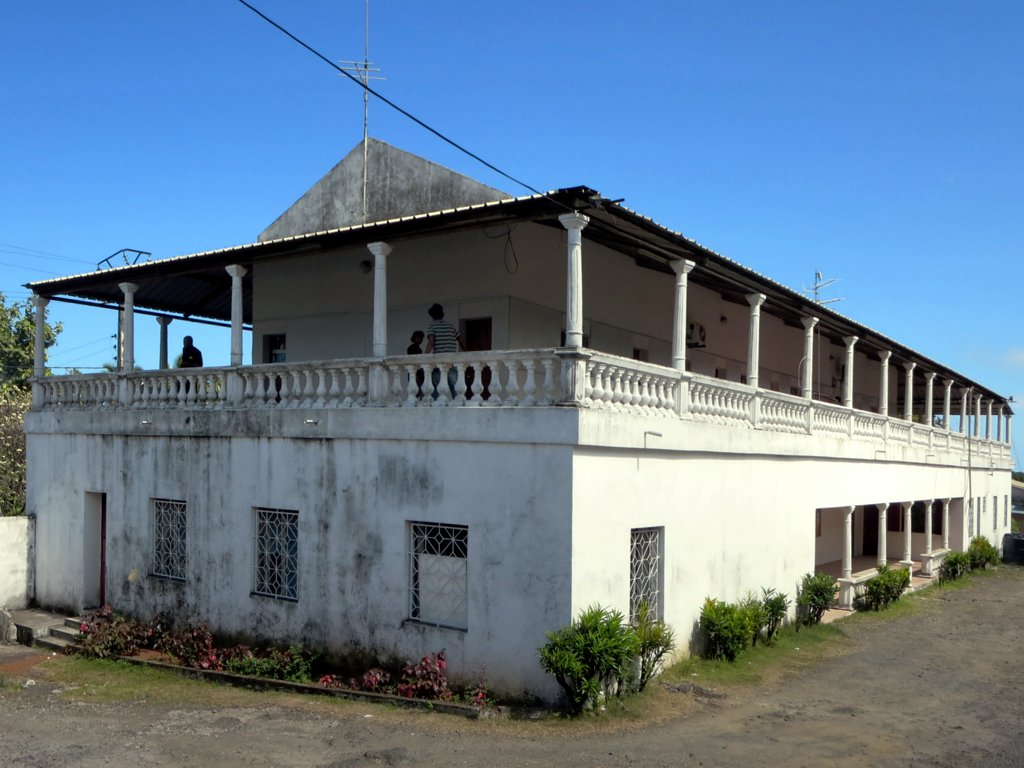
- Exterior of the museum
- Established: 1989
- Location: Moroni, Comoros
- Type: National museum

The National Museum of the Comoros (in French: Le musée national des Comores) is a national museum in the capital city of Moroni on the island of Grande Comore in the Comoros, presenting the country's cultural heritage.

The museum was established in 1989 and has four exhibit rooms with collections on:

1. History, Art, Archeology and Religion
2. Volcanology and Earth Science
3. Oceanography and Natural Science
4. Social and Cultural Anthropology.

The museum is part of the National Center of Documentation and Scientific Research (CNDRS). Two smaller regional museums on the islands of Anjouan and Mohéli are associated with the main museum.

== See also ==
- List of museums in the Comoros
- List of national museums
