= Guatemalan National History Museum =

Museum in Guatemala City, Guatemala

Coordinates: 14°38′30.1″N 90°30′35.7″W

The Guatemalan National History Museum or Museo Nacional de Historia is a national museum in Guatemala City, Guatemala. The museum was founded in 1978.
