= National Museums Liverpool =

Public body running museums in Liverpool, England

National Museums Liverpool, formerly National Museums and Galleries on Merseyside, comprises several museums and art galleries in and around Liverpool in Merseyside, England. All the museums and galleries in the group have free admission. The museum is a non-departmental public body sponsored by the Department for Culture, Media and Sport (DCMS) and an exempt charity under English law.

Until 1974 the institutions were under the auspices of the former Liverpool Corporation. The reorganisation of English local government that year resulted in the newly created Merseyside Metropolitan County Council assuming custodianship by mutual agreement with the city authority. In 1978 the Charity Commission transferred to the County Council the trusteeship of the then privately operated Lady Lever Art Gallery and its collection. The Conservative government of Margaret Thatcher subsequently resolved to abolish the Metropolitan Counties and reassign many of their assets to the lower tier City and Borough Councils. In the 1980s, local politics in Liverpool was under the control of the Militant group of the Labour Party. In the lead-up to the county’s abolition, and anticipating their takeover, Liverpool's Militant councillors discussed selling off the world class collections of the Walker Art Gallery to fund social housing in the city. Following a parliamentary select committee report in 1984, and pressure from influential interests, the government was persuaded to assume funding responsibility and to create a new national museum to take over the governance of the group along the lines of the existing trustee museums in London. Thus all of Liverpool's museums were nationalised under the Merseyside Museums and Galleries Order 1986 which created a new national trustee body called National Museums and Galleries on Merseyside. The Trustees changed its operating title to National Museums Liverpool in 2003 but its legal title remains National Museums and Galleries on Merseyside.

The Board of Trustees that governs the museums is appointed by the Secretary of State for Culture, Media and Sport. The founder Chairman was Sir Leslie Young CBE, who served until 1995. His successors were David Croft McDonnell (1995-2005), Loyd Grossman (2005-08), Sir Philip Redmond (2008-2018), Sir David Henshaw (2018-25) and Andrea Nixon (2025-). The Director is appointed by the Board subject to confirmation by the Secretary of State. The founding Director was Sir Richard Foster who served until his death in 2001. He was succeeded by Dr David Fleming (2001-2019), then Laura Pye (2019-).

The institution holds in trust multi-disciplinary collections of worldwide origin made up of more than one million objects and works of art. The organisation holds courses, lectures, activities and events and provides educational workshops and activities for school children, young people and adults. Its venues are open to the public six days a week, from Tuesday to Sunday, providing both free and ticketed exhibitions. National Museums Liverpool has charitable status and is England's only national museums group based entirely outside London. It currently comprises eight different venues, one of which is outside Liverpool itself — the Lady Lever Art Gallery, located in Port Sunlight.

== Museums and art galleries ==
Museum	Year Established	Status	Specialities	Image
World Museum	1851	Open	Ancient History, archaeology, ethnology, natural history, space and time, science	
Walker Art Gallery	1877	Open	Art: Painting, sculpture and craft	
Merseyside Maritime Museum	1980	Temporarily closed	Immigration, Maritime history	
The Piermaster's House	1983	Closed (2023)	Wartime	
Border Force National Museum	1994	Temporarily closed	The Border Force National Museum (Known as:Seized! The Border and Customs uncovered), highlighting the work of the HM Revenue & Customs and the UK Border Agency, covering smuggling, crime and the history of tax. Located in the basement gallery of Merseyside Maritime Museum since May 2008.	
International Slavery Museum	2007	Temporarily closed, Phase 2 under development	Historical and contemporary aspects of slavery	
Lady Lever Art Gallery	1922	Open	Art: paintings, sculpture and furniture	
Sudley House	1944	Open	Art, fashion	
Museum of Liverpool	2011	Open	Liverpool's social and cultural history. The museum follows the Museum of Liverpool Life, open 1993–2006	
National Conservation Centre	1996	Closed	Art, conservation science and technology. Closed to the public 17 December 2010. Conservation work continues behind the scenes.	
