= Gimhae National Museum =

National museum in Gimhae, South Korea

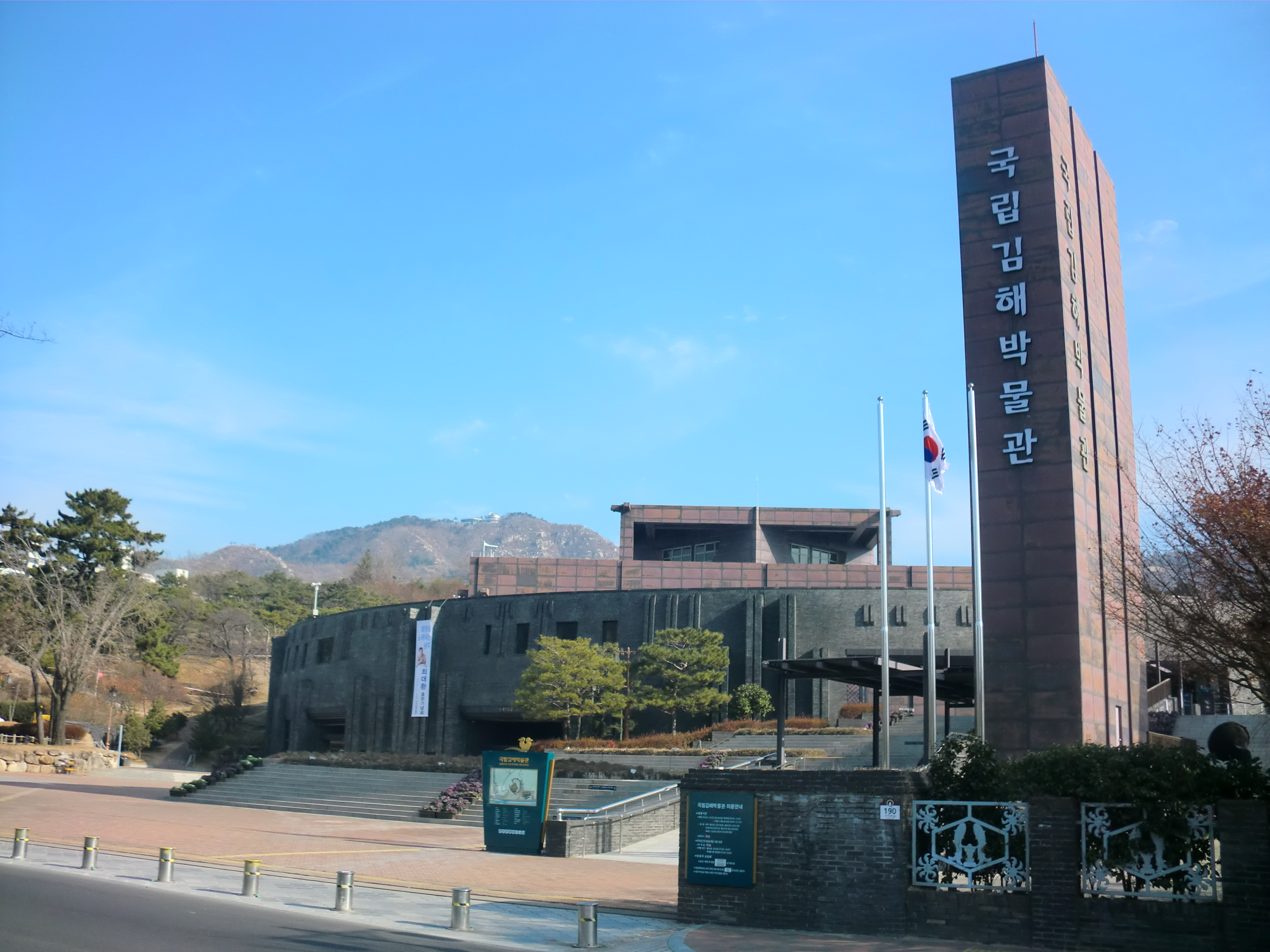
- Established: 29 July 1998
- Location: Gimhae, South Gyeongsang Province, South Korea
- Coordinates: 35.2428°N 128.8734°E
- Type: national museum
- Website: gimhae.museum.go.kr/en/

Korean name
- Hangul: 국립김해박물관
- Hanja: 國立金海博物館
- RR: Gungnip Gimhae bangmulgwan
- MR: Kungnip Kimhae pangmulgwan

Gimhae National Museum (Korean: 국립김해박물관) is a national museum located in Gimhae, South Gyeongsang Province, South Korea. It opened on July 29, 1998, with the aim to compile available cultural properties of Gaya, one of ancient states in Korea.

== See also ==
- List of museums in South Korea
- National museum
