= Lawrence Foanaota =

Solomon Islands archaeologist

Lawrence Foanaota OBE, born on Malaita, is a Solomon Islander archaeologist. He has been director & curator of the Solomon Islands National Museum since 1972. He has also been President of the Pacific Island Museums Association.

In 2009, the Queen of the Solomon Islands, Elizabeth II, appointed him Officer of the Order of the British Empire, for "services to the National Museum and to the community".
