= Boganda National Museum =

National museum of the Central African Republic

Coordinates: 4.36411°N 18.57698°E

- Musée National Boganda
- Established: 1966
- Type: National Museum
- Collections: History

The Boganda National Museum (French: Musée National Boganda), also known as the Barthélémy Boganda National Ethnographic Museum, is a national museum of the Central African Republic. It is located in the Rue du Languedoc region of the capital, Bangui. Named after the country's first prime minister, it was founded in the 1960s and remained open until the Central African Republic Civil War. Despite looting, the majority of the artifacts remain at the museum in boxes.

== History ==
Situated in the Rue du Languedoc region of Bangui, Central African Republic, the Boganda National Museum was founded in 1964 and opened in 1966. It was named after Barthélemy Boganda, the country's first prime minister. It has been closed to the public since 2013–14, however, due to the Central African Republic Civil War, leading to the building being ransacked during the period. Despite these attacks on the building, the majority of 3500 artifacts remain at the site, and have since been stored in large wooden crates within the building to protect them from looting.

== Collections ==
The museum holds artifacts which cover the culture and ethnography of the Central African Republic and hosts items from all 16 provinces of the country. It has many collections covering the culture of the country, including one collection focussing on the ethnic group of pygmy people. Other sections of the collection focus on ethnography, archeology and natural history of the region. The culture is documented through pottery, historic coins, traditional African masks and musical instruments, as well as weapons, hunting tools and religious objects.
