= Djibouti Museum =

Museum in Djibouti

- Location: Djibouti City, Djibouti
- Type: Art museum History museum

The Djibouti Museum (Arabic: متحف جيبوتي, romanized: Matḥaf Jībūtī) is a history and art museum in Djibouti City, Djibouti. Its collections include art and archaeological objects.

== See also ==
- List of museums in Djibouti
- List of national museums
