= Chuncheon National Museum =

Museum in Chuncheon, South Korea

Coordinates: 37.8641°N 127.7537°E

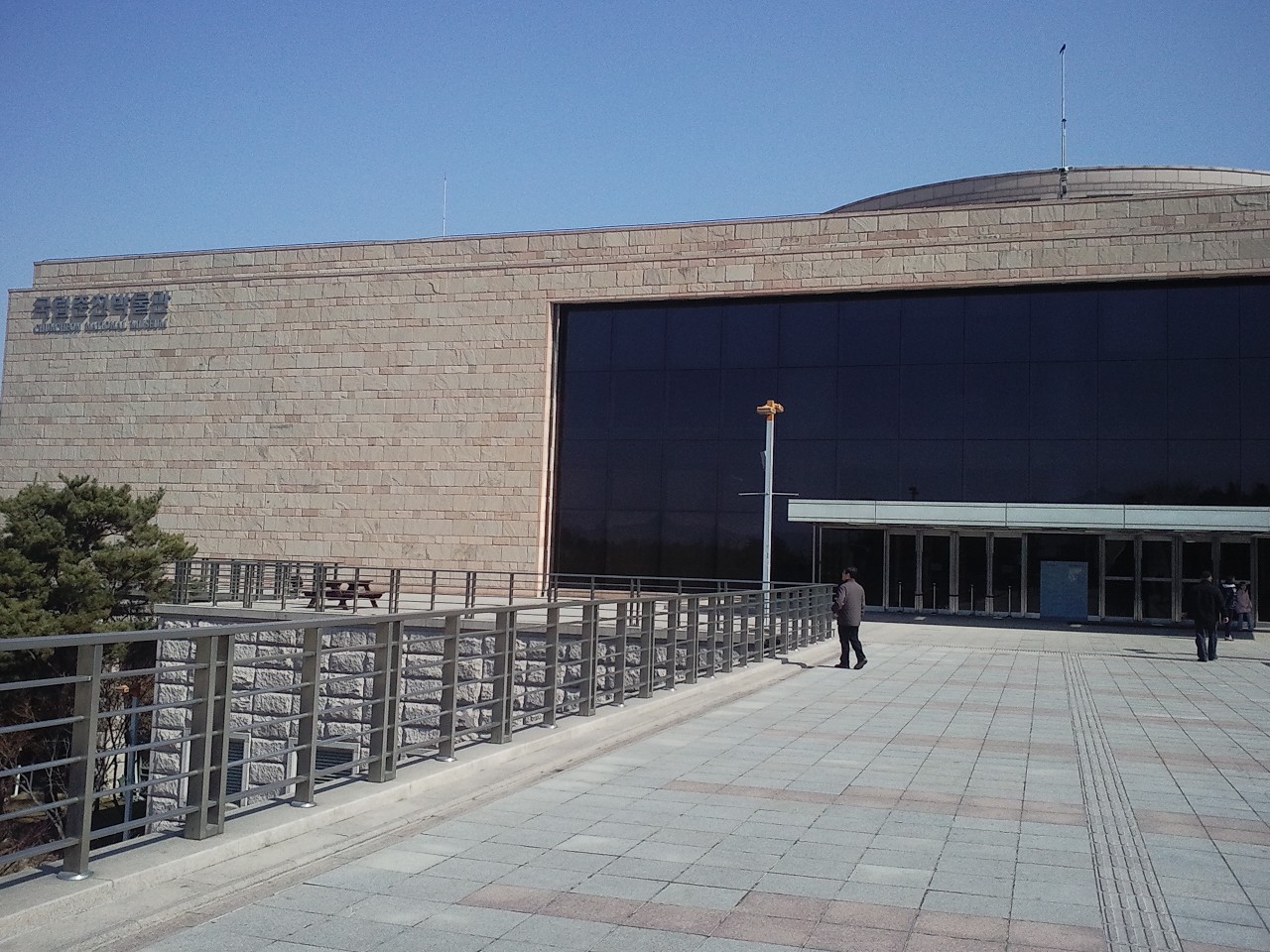

Korean name
- Hangul: 국립춘천박물관
- Hanja: 國立春川博物館
- RR: Gungnip Chuncheon bangmulgwan
- MR: Kungnip Ch'unch'ŏn pangmulgwan

Chuncheon National Museum (Korean: 국립춘천박물관) is a national museum in Chuncheon, South Korea. It opened on October 30, 2002.

== See also ==
- List of museums in South Korea
- National museum
