= Gwangju National Museum =

National museum in Gwangju, South Korea

Coordinates: 35.1910°N 126.8908°E

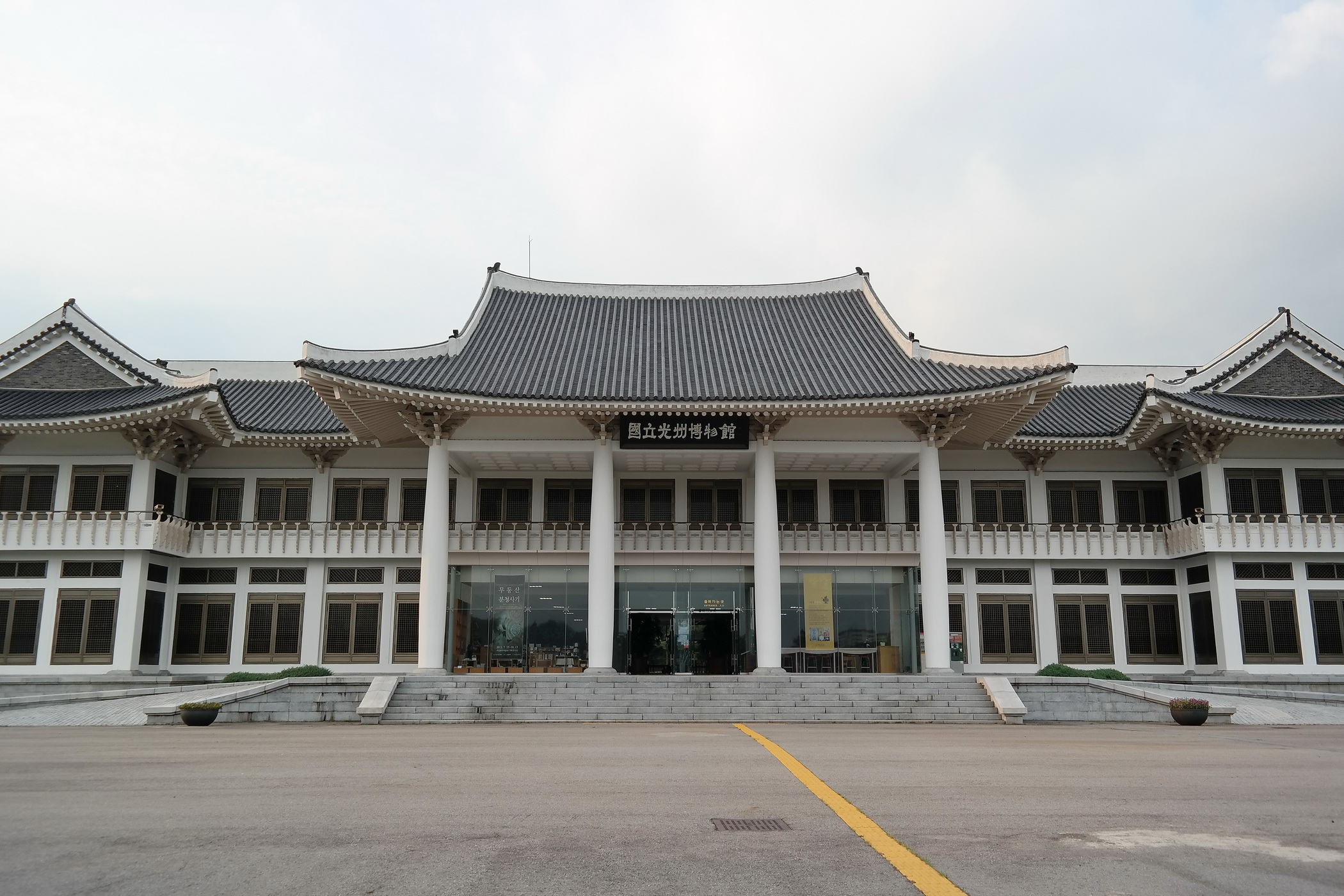

Korean name
- Hangul: 국립광주박물관
- Hanja: 國立光州博物館
- RR: Gungnip Gwangju bangmulgwan
- MR: Kungnip Kwangju pangmulgwan

Gwangju National Museum (Korean: 국립광주박물관) is a national museum located in Gwangju, South Korea. The museum opened on December 6, 1978.

The museum has a central hanok-style building and two additional buildings. It has around 130,000 items.

== See also ==
- List of museums in South Korea
