= List of museums in Djibouti =

Below is a list of museums in Djibouti.

== List ==
- Djibouti Museum

== See also ==
- List of museums
