= List of museums in the Comoros =

Below is a list of museums in the Comoros.

== List ==
- National Museum of Comoros

== See also ==
- List of museums
