= Buyeo National Museum =

National museum in Buyeo, South Korea

Coordinates: 36.276357°N 126.918843°E

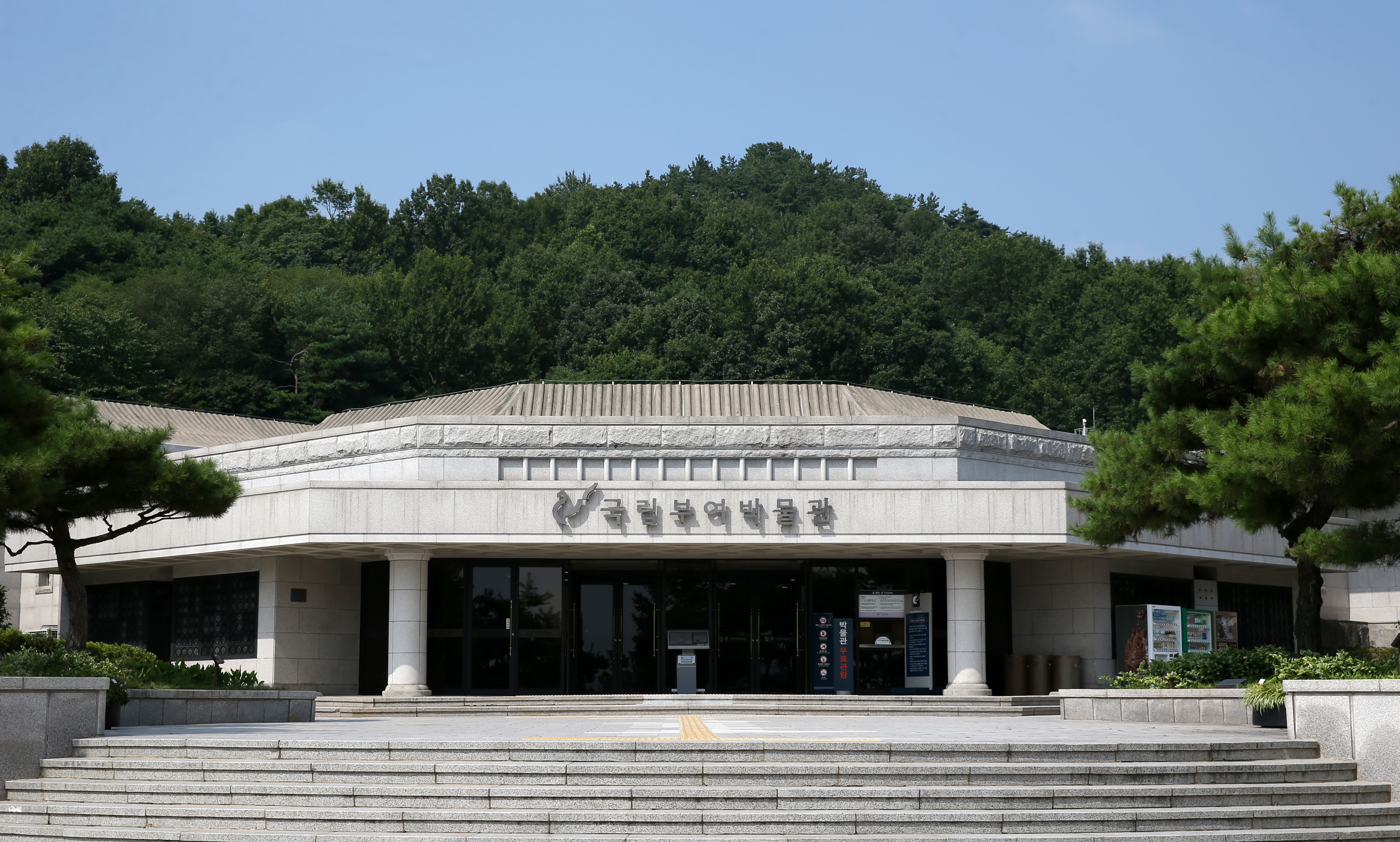

Korean name
- Hangul: 국립부여박물관
- Hanja: 國立扶餘博物館
- RR: Gungnip Buyeo bangmulgwan
- MR: Kungnip Puyŏ pangmulgwan

Buyeo National Museum (Korean: 국립부여박물관) is a national museum located in Buyeo County, South Chungcheong Province, South Korea. Since Buyeo was once the capital of the Baekje kingdom during the Sabi period (538-660), the Museum is fully devoted to the Baekje culture.

== History ==
It was moved from the downhills of Buso Mountain to the current location.

It is the royal road of Sabi Baekje, where ancient Baekje culture blossomed the most splendidly, and its footsteps and true appearance can be easily found. Under this cultural background, the Buyeo National Museum has a history of about 80 years, starting with the Buyeo Antiquities Preservation Society, which was launched in 1929.

== Artifacts ==
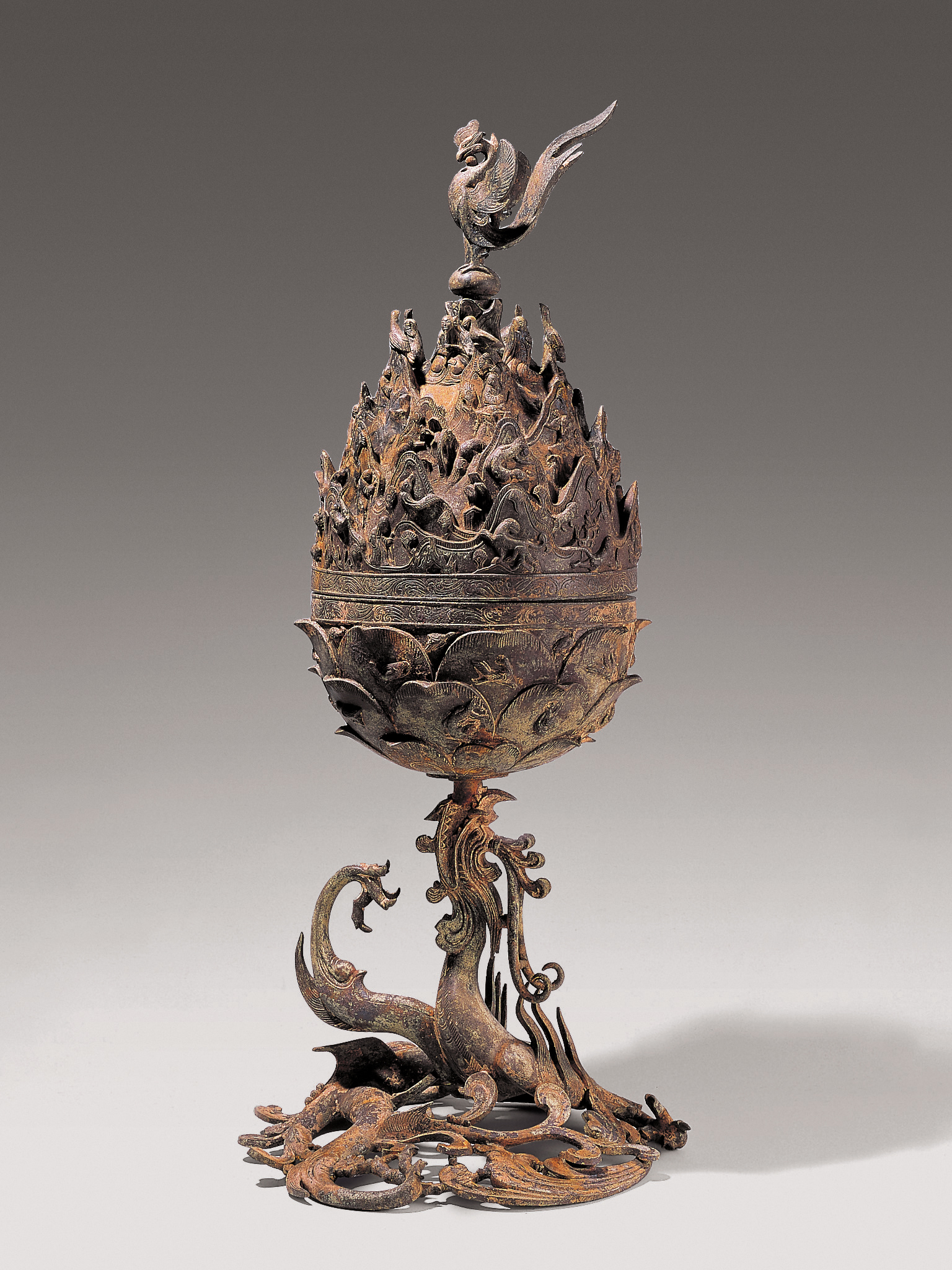
Gilt-bronze Incense Burner of Baekje

Main display of the museum is Gilt-bronze Incense Burner of Baekje. In particular, the museum preserves and manages the cultural heritage of Baekje, including prehistoric culture in western Chungcheongnam-do. Representative relics include Baekje Geumdong Daehyang-ro, Geumdong Gwaneum Bodhisattva, and Sansu phoenix-patterned bricks.

== See also ==
- List of museums in South Korea
