= Bokcheon Museum =

Archaeology museum in Busan, South Korea

Coordinates: 35°12′32.1″N 129°05′28.1″E

The Bokcheon Museum (Korean: 복천박물관; Hanja: 福泉博物館) is an archaeology museum in Busan, South Korea. Opened on October 5, 1996, the museum is dedicated to the history of the city of Busan from the Samhan era to the Samguk era. Its artifacts include military weapons, armor, clothing, and household tools unearthed from the Bokcheon-dong burial ground.
