= Emirates National Auto Museum =

Automobile museum in Abu Dhabi

Coordinates: 24.09890°N 54.42011°E

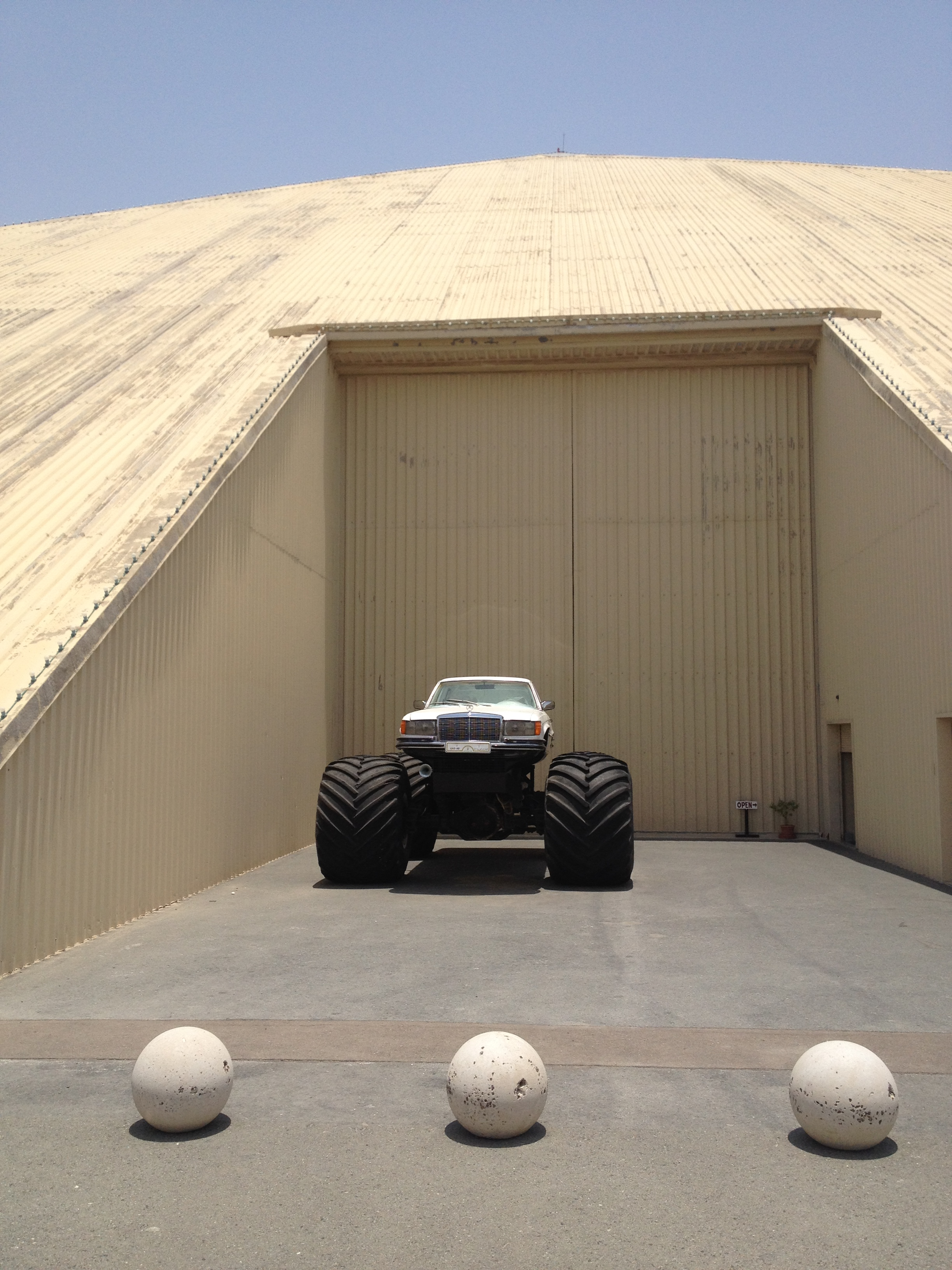
A Mercedes-Benz atop a massive chassis at the Emirates National Auto Museum.

The Emirates National Auto Museum is a national automobile museum in the Emirate of Abu Dhabi, United Arab Emirates.

The museum is located in Al Dhafra about 45 kilometres (28 mi) south of the city of Abu Dhabi. The museum has a collection of around 3000 cars belonging to Sheikh Hamad bin Hamdan Al Nahyan in a pyramid-shaped building.

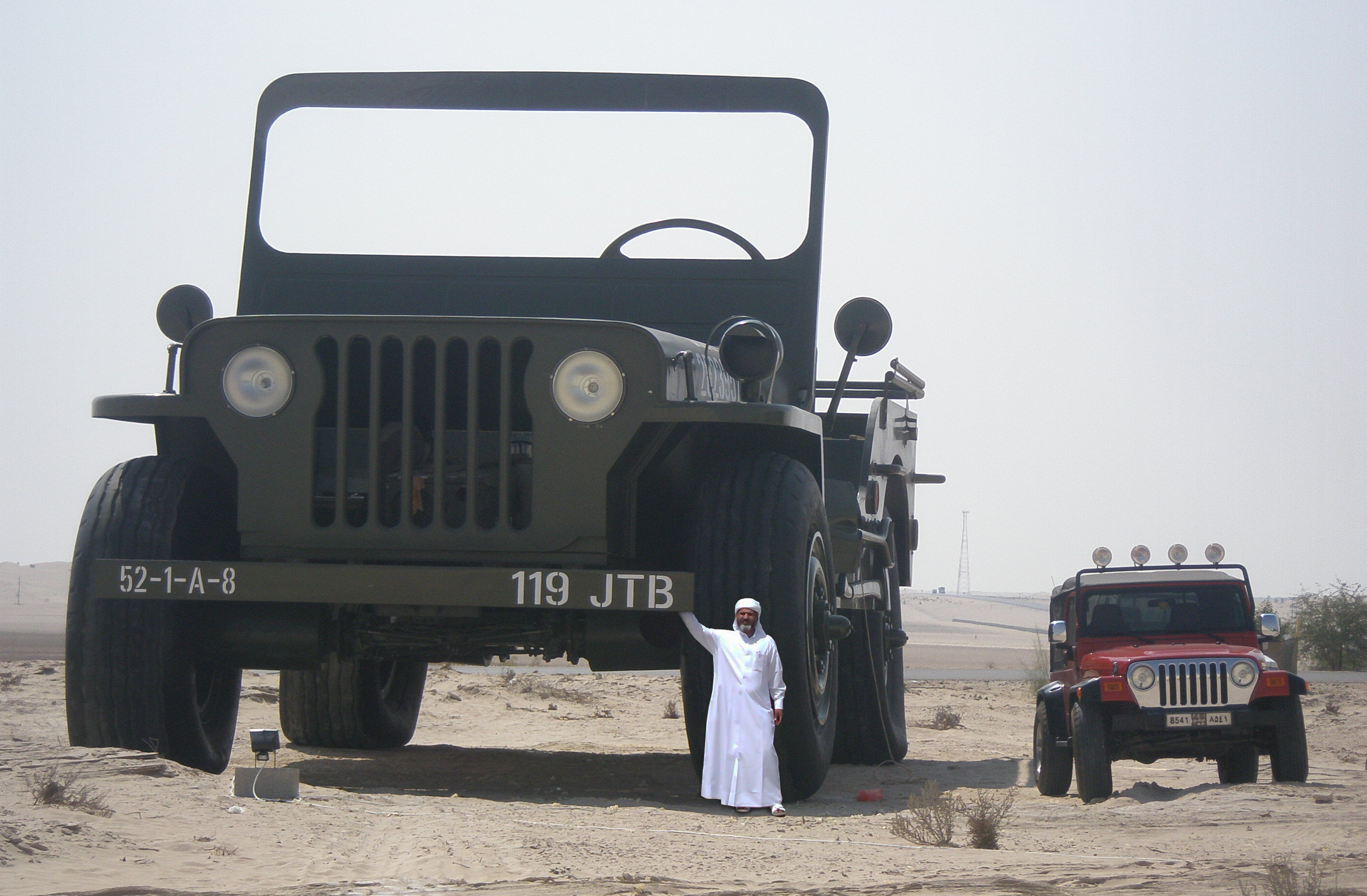
Sheikh Hamad bin Hamdan Al Nahyan with the largest model of a Willys jeep, 2009

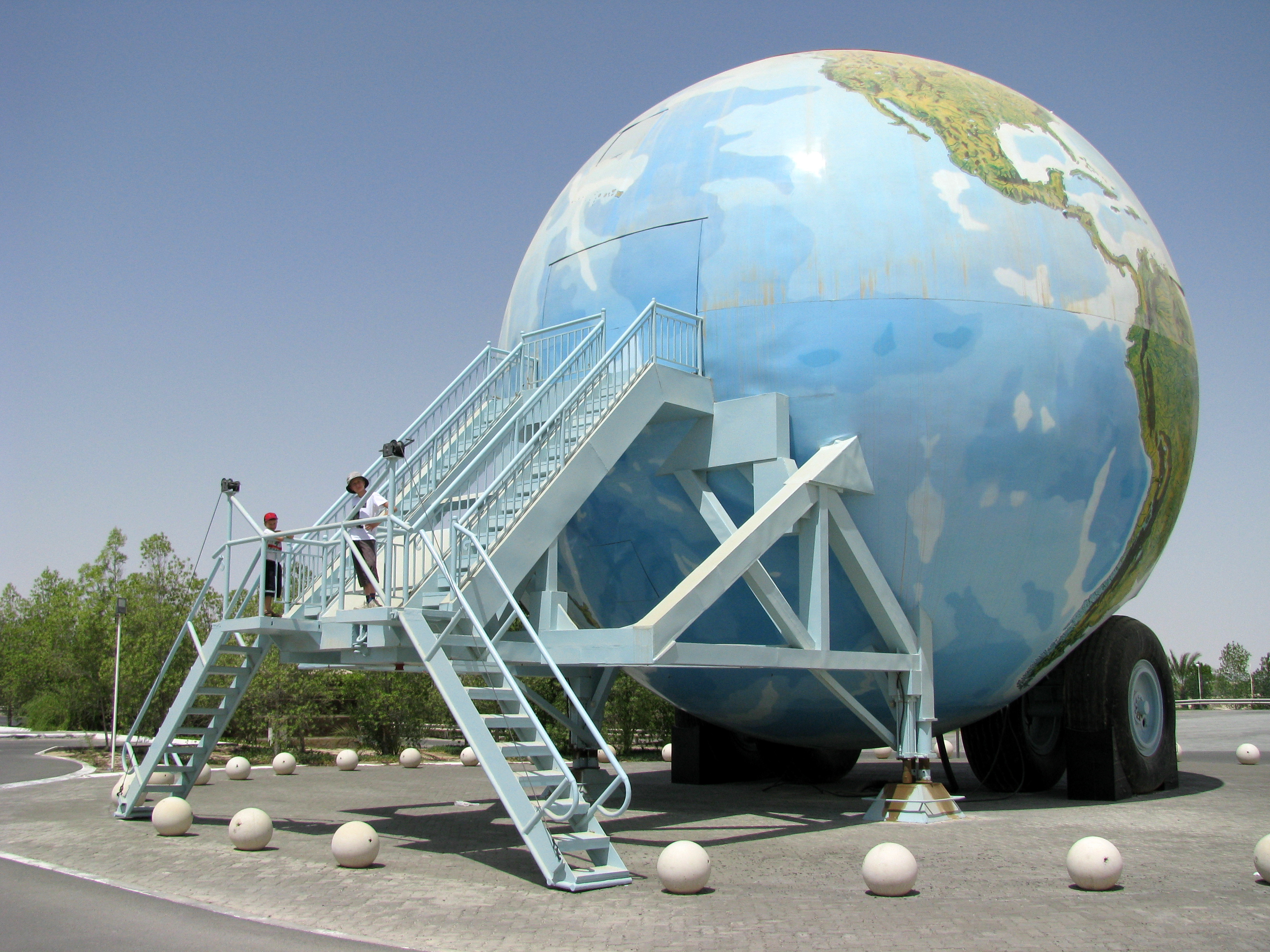
Giant globe caravan at the museum

Hamad bin Hamdan Al Nahyan's collection holds several world records including the largest collection of 4x4 vehicles at 718, the largest caravan at 122 tons with eight bedrooms and the worlds largest motorised model car a 4-to-1 drivable scale replica Willys Jeep. The collection also includes a wide range of military vehicles, classic American cars, a Mercedes "rainbow" collection of different coloured cars, an 1885 steam-powered Mercedes .

Three items from the collection were used in an episode of the BBC television programme Top Gear. These were the 20-foot (6.1 m) tall Willys Jeep, a modified 8x8 Nissan Patrol and a Mercedes Benz Monster Truck.
