= Solomon Islands National Museum =

Museum in Honiara, Solomon Islands

- Solomon Islands National Museum
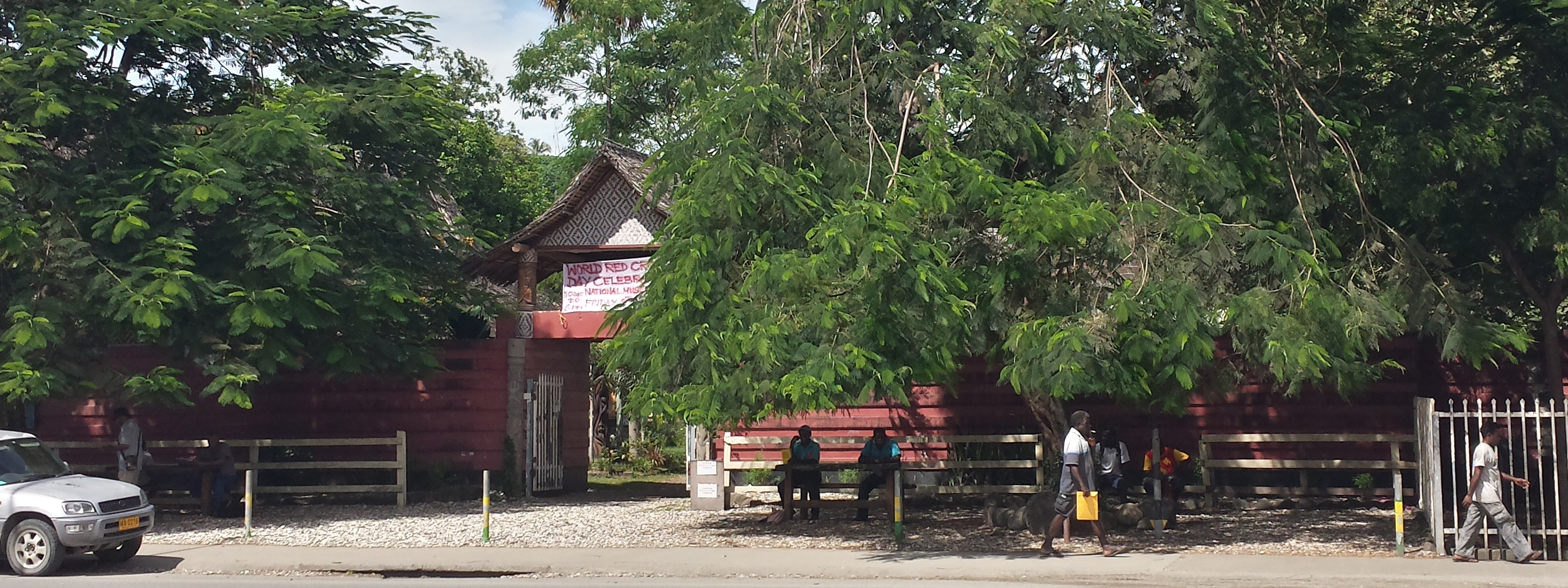
- Formation: 1969
- Founded at: Honiara
- Type: Governmental
- Coordinates: 9°25′52″S 159°57′15″E
- Director: Tony Heorake
- Staff: 15 (2018)
- Website: solomons.gov.sb/ministry-of-culture-and-tourism/solomon-islands-national-museum

The Solomon Islands National Museum is the national museum of the Solomon Islands and is located in Honiara. It is a department of the Ministry of Culture and Tourism.

== History ==
The museum officially opened in June 1969. However, the museum was initiated in the 1951, when the islands were a British protectorate. The collection was formed by Geoffrey F. C. Dennis and James L. O. Tedder, amongst others, who were interested in the material culture of the Solomon Islands and combined their private collections. The collections were exhibited in a number of locations in Honiara, including the Solomon Islands Teacher Training College, until the Gulbenkian Foundation funded the purpose-built museum. The new museum was organised by the Honiara Museum Association, which was mostly made up of expatriate colonial officers, however there was limited representation of the islanders from Solomon Dakei and Silas Sitai. At this point Solomon Islanders began to donate some of their own items of cultural importance to the collection.

In 1972 the museum became a government institution and expanded its site in Honiara, as well as expanding its activities to outlying islands.

During the period of ethnic violence from 1999 to 2003, the museum continued to function, but was looted and many important cultural artefacts are lost: shell money valuables were removed for local use; other objects were sold to overseas collectors.

== Collections and research ==
The museum consists of a number of buildings, which each contain their own gallery, examining themes such as inter-island politics and Solomon Islands independence. The museum's compound also contains offices and an auditorium, with outdoor stage. The museum holds over two thousand objects and the collection includes natural science specimens, archaeological artefacts and objects relating to the Second World War. It also holds marine and geological specimens. In 1972 the museum began to collect contemporary sculpture. In 1988 the museum collaborated with Osaka University to record and document music and dance traditions of the islands. In 2014 the museum hosted an exhibition to commemorate Australian South Sea Islanders who were ""black birded" to work in the sugar cane fields of Queensland and Northern New South Wales between 1863 and 1904".

=== Archaeology ===
The museum has an active archaeological research programme. This has includes several research excavation on Santa Isabel, most recently in the 2010s in the Kia area. In 2016 the museum collaborated on a programme of archaeological excavation at Apunirereha, East Are’Are in Malaita Province. The site is a rock shelter used by prehistoric people and has deposits which included faunal remains, stone tools, shells and human remains.

=== Overseas collections ===
Due to a legacy of colonial exploitation of the Solomon Islands, important objects reflecting the country's cultural heritage are held in foreign collections. Some of these institutions include: Horniman Museum; the Cooper Hewitt; National Museums Scotland; the Metropolitan Museum of Art; the Science Museum Group; In 2019 the British Museum opened a new display on the history of collecting in the Solomon Islands, which exhibited five objects with five different stories of acquisition.

=== Repatriation ===
In 1973 the Solomon Islands Museum requested the return of a shell-inlaid shield and other items from the Australian Museum. The request was denied by the Australian Museum on the grounds that "the shield was the only one of its kind in Australia, whereas other museums in the USA and UK each held several examples of better quality".

The British Museum has many objects from the Solomon Islands in its collections, including a feast trough which was stolen in 1891 in a punitive expedition by Captain Edward Davis. Davis looted this and many other objects, later selling them in London; the British Museum has fifty objects it purchased from Davis in its collection. In 2018 the trough was displayed at the Royal Academy in its exhibition Oceania and at the time, the Solomon Islanders expressed a desire for its repatriation. Another highly significant object in the British Museum is a war canoe from Vella Lavella, which is the largest watercraft in the museum's collections. The canoe was built in 1910 by Jiosi Angele, who was commissioned to build it by a member of the colonial government. It was purchased in 1913 by William Lever, brought to the UK and subsequently donated to the British Museum. The museum and its academic partners invested in what was termed "digital repatriation" of the canoe, where the boat was scanned at a high resolution and the digital data transferred to the Solomon Islands. However, many places in the Pacific, including the Solomon Islands, do not have access to the same digital infrastructure as Europe.

== Notable people ==
- Lawrence Foanaota, former Director
- Tony Heorake, Director

== Gallery ==
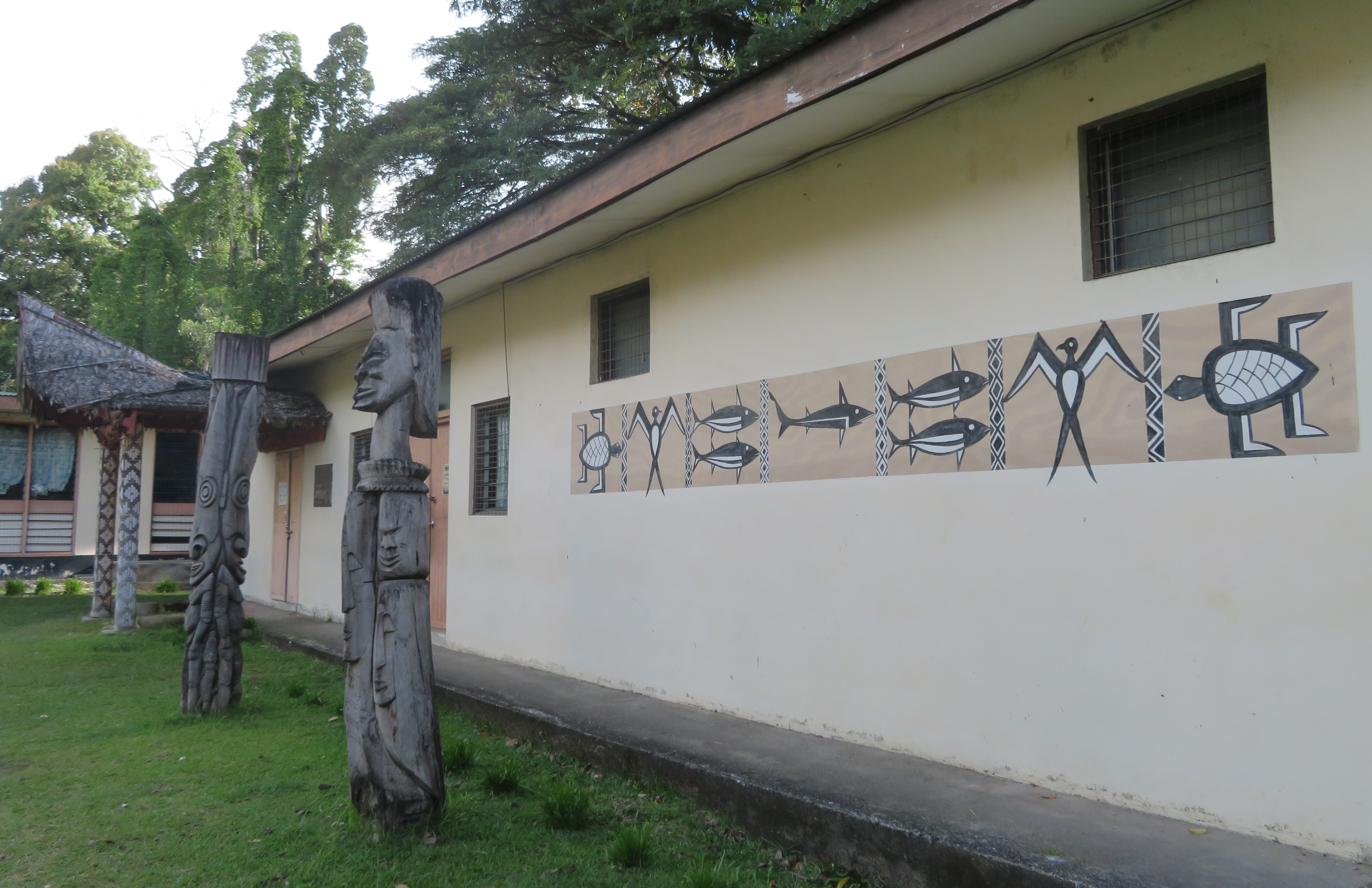
Compound of SINM

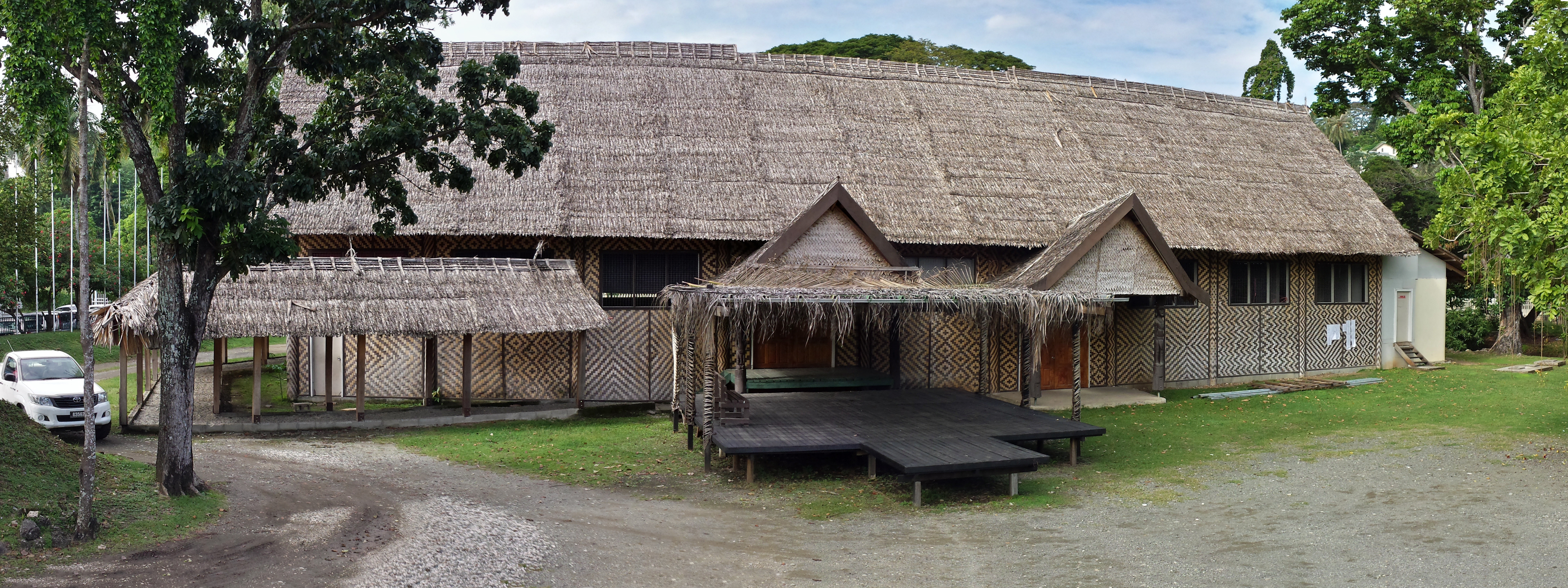
Honiara Open-Air Stage

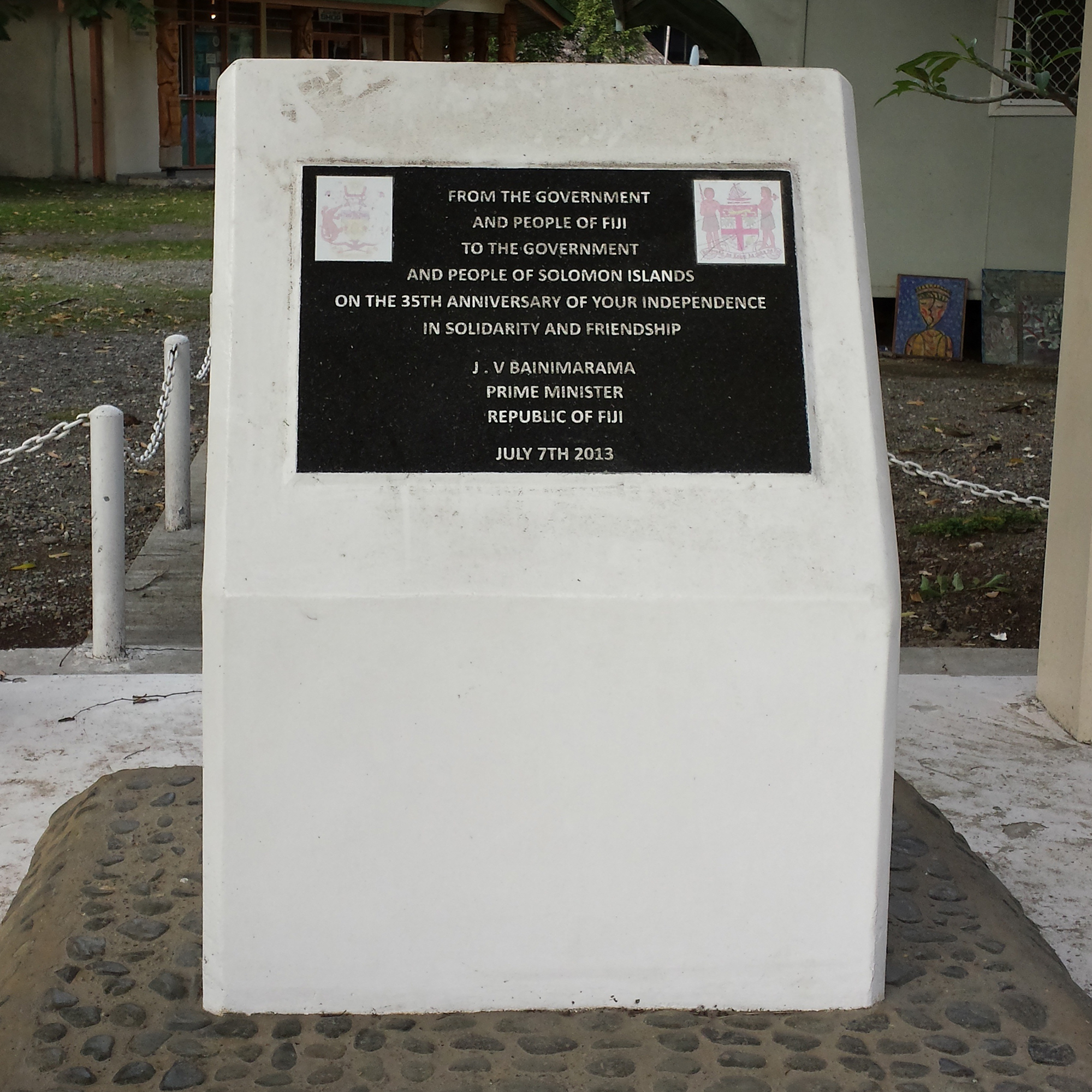
Monument marking gift from Fiji on 35th anniversary of Solomon Islands independence

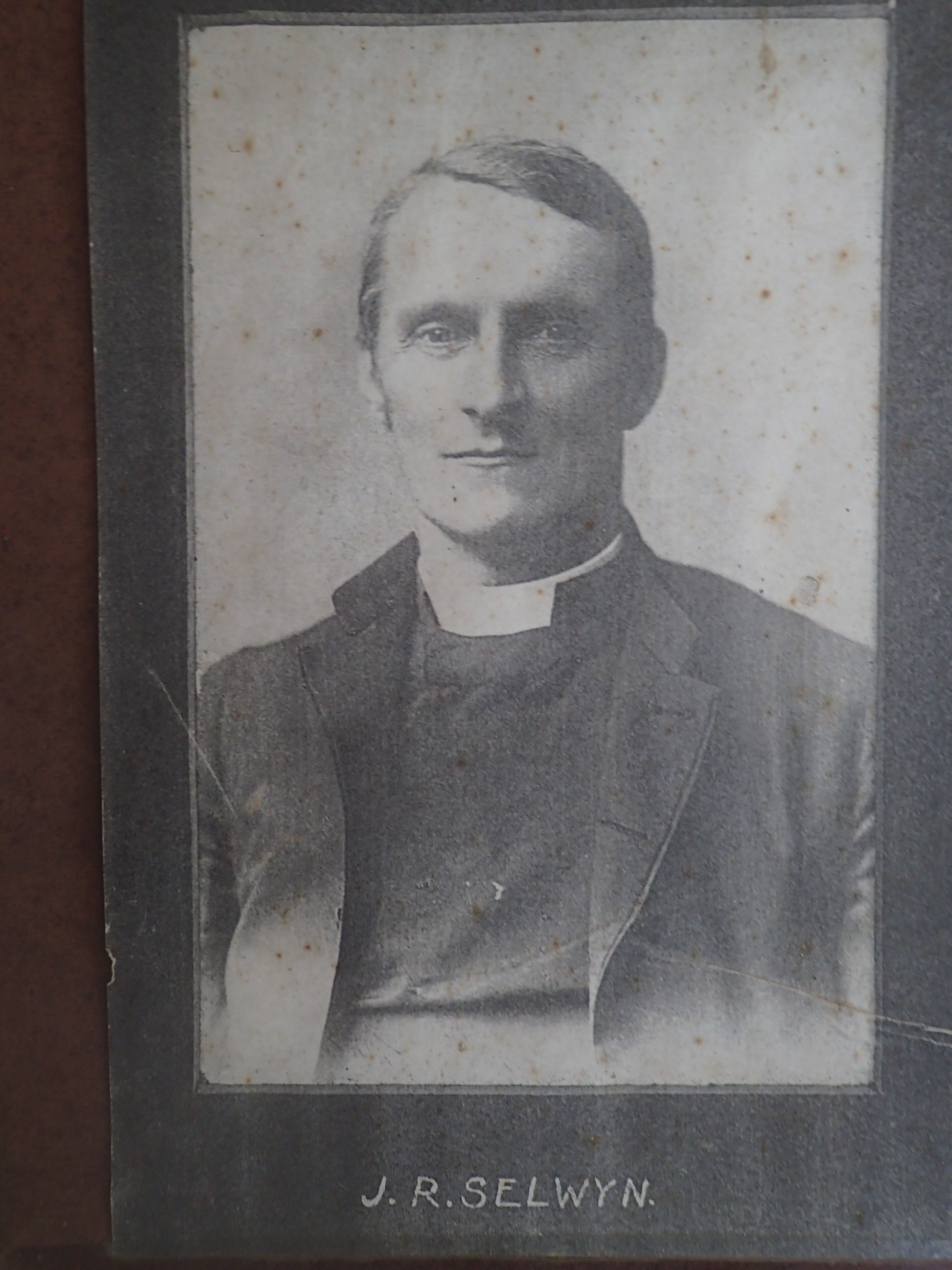
Photo of Bishop John Selwyn, displayed at Solomon Islands National Museum
