= Nauru Museum =

Museum in Yaren, Nauru

Coordinates: 0°32′49″S 166°54′59″E

- Nauru Museum
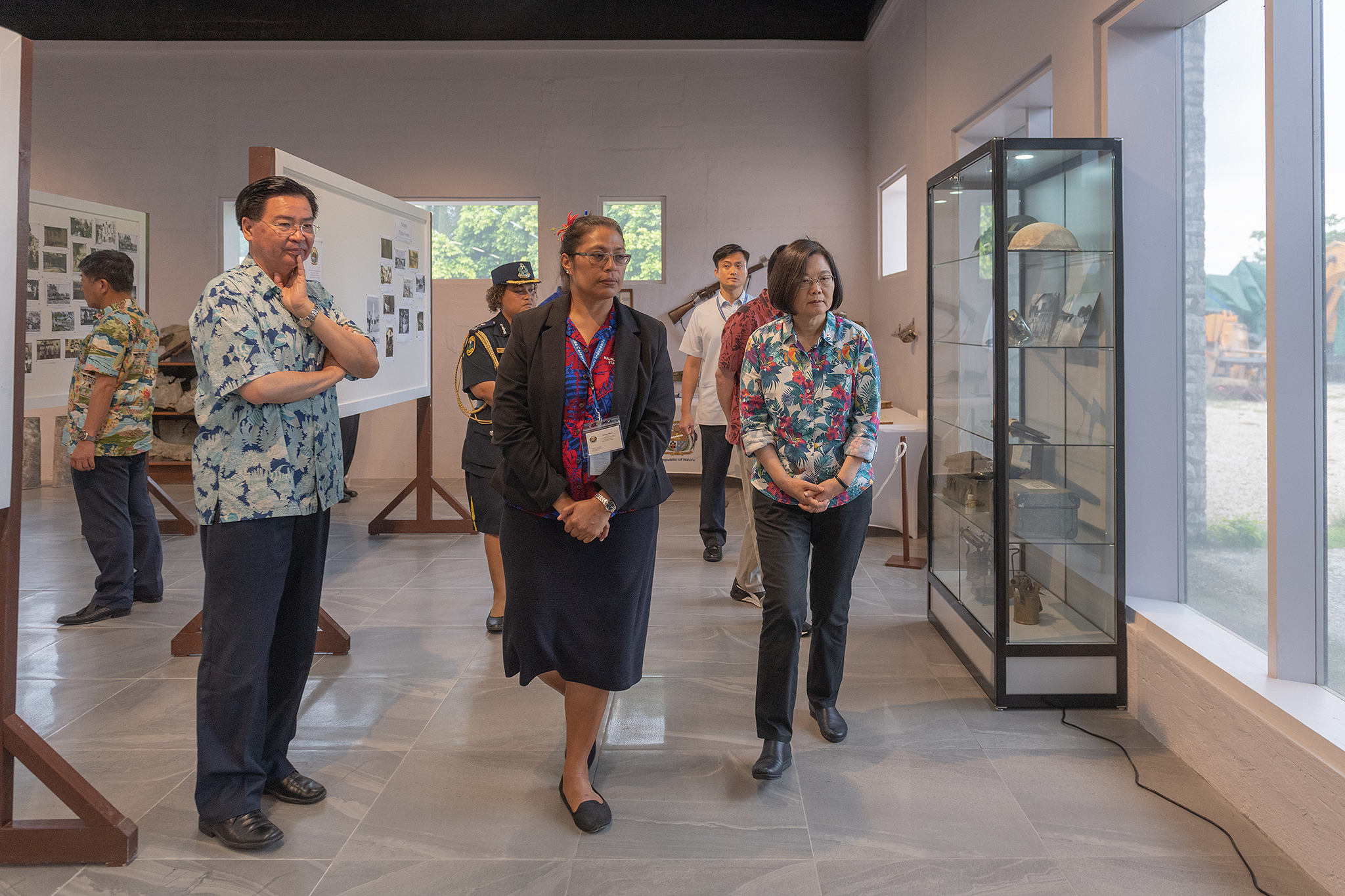
- Nauru Museum during the president of the Republic of China, Tsai Ing-wen's visit in 2019
- Formation: 30 January 2019; 7 years ago
- Purpose: Preserve Nauru's culture and heritage
- Location: Yaren, Nauru

Nauru Museum or Naoero Museum is the national museum of the Republic of Nauru. Located in Yaren, the museum formally opened on 30 January 2019. Entry is free and the opening hours are 1 p.m. to 5 p.m. Monday to Friday.

== History ==
Based on a private collection of Second World War material, the museum was initially funded by the Nauru Phosphate Corporation. The museum closed in the 2000s due to disputes over land. In 2014, strategy for a new museum was presented to UNESCO's Framework Convention for Climate Change, as part of the government of Nauru's aim to "preserve Nauruan language and cultural heritage".

== Collection ==
The collection is made up of historic objects, items relating to the island during the Second World War, objects relating to radio and police, as well as a photographic collection. In 2019 the Nauru Museum publicly appealed for more objects to be donated to the collection.

Due to a legacy of colonial exploitation, much of Nauru's photographic archive and material culture is held in foreign institutions, some of which include: the British Museum; the Museum of New Zealand Te Papa Tongarewa; the Metropolitan Museum of Art; and the Israel Museum. The National Museum of Australia has collected objects relating to Nauru's refugee crisis.
