= Border Force National Museum =

Law enforcement museum in Liverpool, England

Coordinates: 53.4012°N 2.9929°W

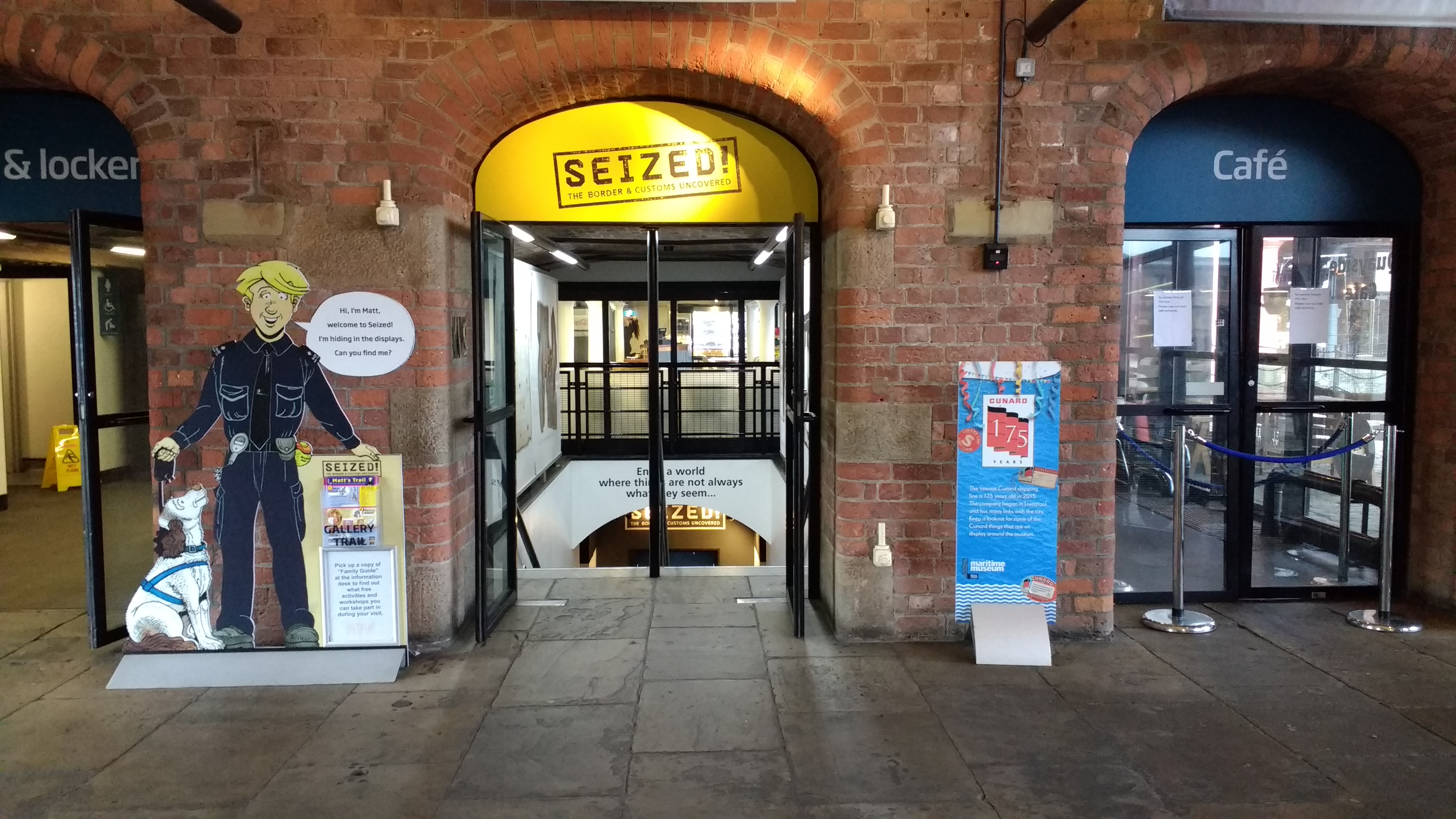
- The entrance to Seized! The Border and Customs Uncovered
- Established: 1994
- Location: Liverpool, England
- Type: Smuggling and law enforcement museum
- Website: Border Force National Museum

The Border Force National Museum (previously - UK Border Agency) is located in Liverpool, England and holds the national collection of HM Revenue and Customs, one of the most important collections of its type held anywhere in the world. Originally HM Customs & Excise National Museum, the collection is now a gallery located on the basement floor of the Merseyside Maritime Museum at the Albert Dock.

== Collection ==
The exhibits tell the story of smuggling and contraband from the 18th century to the present day. They include an extensive display of tools of the job, prints, paintings and photographs relating to the work of the UK Border Agency and HM Revenue and Customs. Other items look at the ingenious and often dangerous world of smuggling, prohibited goods and concealment.

== History ==
The museum was established in 1994 a partnership between National Museums Liverpool and HM Customs & Excise, which in 2005 merged with the Inland Revenue to form HM Revenue and Customs. The museum was designed to educate the public about smuggling and contraband from 1700s to the present day.

The museum was named as HM Revenue and Customs National Museum in May 2008 (known as 'Seized! Revenue and Customs Uncovered') and then became the UK Border Agency National Museum (known as 'Seized! The Border and Customs uncovered') following a new lead partnership with the UK Border Agency in 2009. Following the rename of the UK Border Agency in 2012 to Border Force, the museum is now known as "Seized! The Border and Customs uncovered Border Force National Museum".

Since May 2008 the collection has been located in the basement of Merseyside Maritime Museum. Fraser Randall was chosen to carry out a refurbishment of the exhibition by National Museums Liverpool. The construction company created setworks, interactives, audio visual and graphics works. The exhibition designers updated the collection with the ability for visitor interaction and family-friendly displays. The cost of the refurbishment totalled £500,000.
