= National Museum of Ras Al Khaimah =

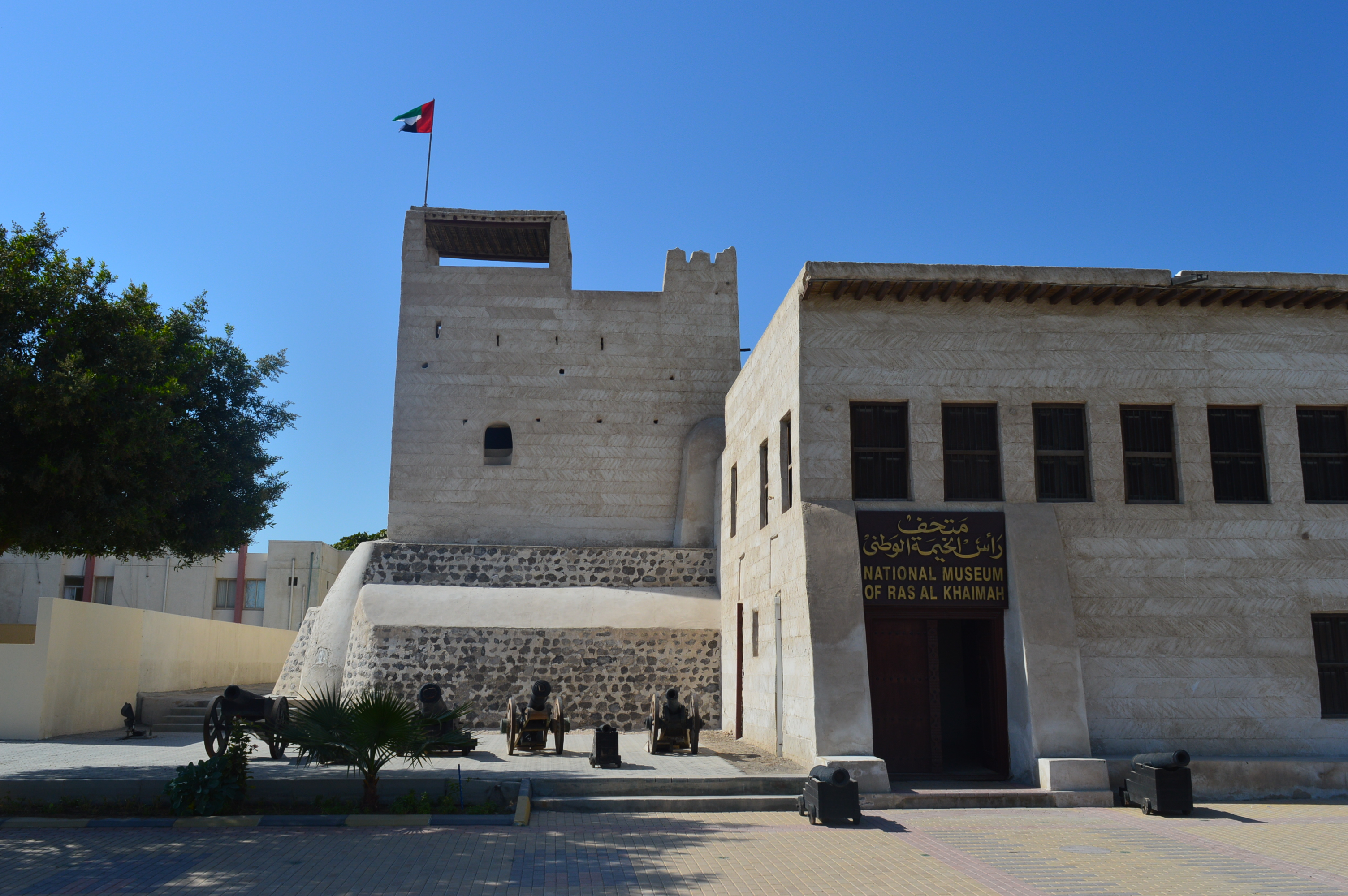
- Established: 1986
- Location: Old Town, Ras Al Khaimah, United Arab Emirates
- Coordinates: 25.794514°N 55.945032°E
- Type: History & Archeology Museum

The National Museum of Ras Al Khaimah (Arabic: متحف رأس الخيمة الوطني) is a museum located in the emirate of Ras al-Khaimah, in the north of the United Arab Emirates. The museum contains archaeological collections and historical artifacts of the country.

== History ==
The fort was built in the 16th century, this fort was attacked by the British in 1819 due to allegations of pirate attacks. The fort was used as a ruler's residence until 1964, then the fort was used as a police station and later as a prison. In 1984, work began on converting the building into a museum, the project was led by Jayanth Laxman. The museum opened for the first time in 18 November 1987. During the first year of opening, Merschel Schenkel donated a collection of shells to the museum. The museum's fossils were donated by the Ecology Group of Dubai, which were collected between 1984 and 1986. Based on historical sources as well as information from the Emirati government, the original fort before the attacks by Europeans was known as "Early Fort", after the attacks, the reconstructed fort based on the original building where the museum is now located is known as "Late Fort", some sources give the name of the building as "Al Hisn Fort".

== Collections ==
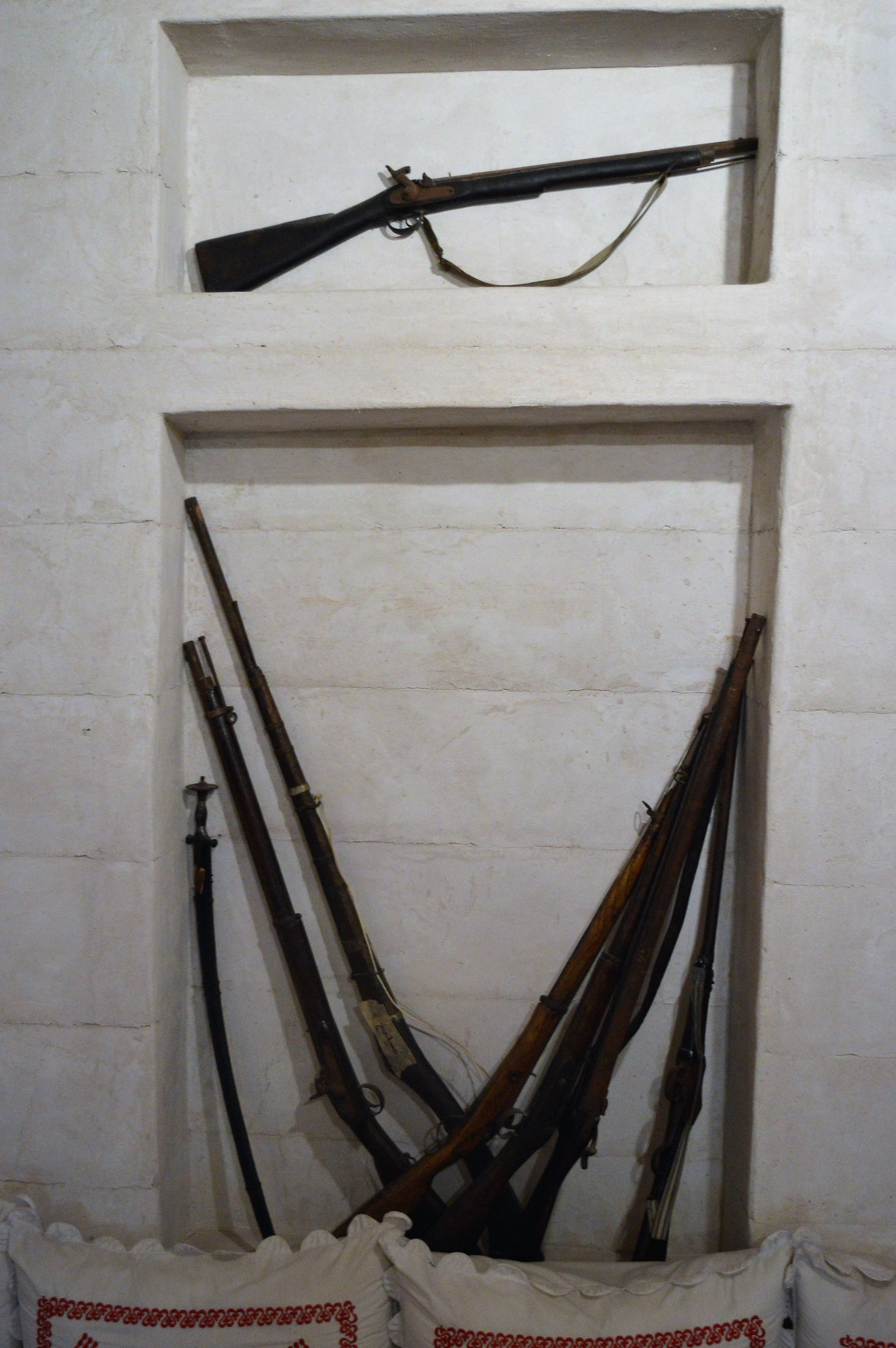
Old guns in the Majlis at National Museum of Ras Al Khaimah

The museum's collections were from Archaeological discoveries since 1968 in the emirate of Ras Al Khaimah, partially donated by city residents and the Quwasim family. The museum contains archaeological discoveries from stone age, bronze age, Iron Age, pre-Islamic Sassanian period, Islamic and Julfar period. The museum also has a collection of fishing nets. The museum contains a 19th-century coin found in the Falaya Palace, where the peace treaty between the British and the Trucial States was signed; this coin is called "Mardhouf Al Quwasim" as it was minted by the Quwasim family. In addition, the museum contains a madbasa, a "date-press" room used to extract date syrup (a method found since 2000 years ago), a 12th-century gold coin, and 4000-year-old palm seed found at the Shamal Bronze Age settlement site. The museum contains cylindrical seals from Wadi al-Qawr. The museum contains the only Jewish artifact found in the UAE: a gravestone with an inscription referring to David, son of Moses, which was discovered in 1998 around the area of Shamal. In October 2020, the museum launched the Tamra temporary exhibition (closed in 2022), about the importance and history of the date palm tree in cultural practices and heritage in the region. The museum contains antique weapons and antiquities found in the Emirate of Ras Al Khaimah, in addition the museum will have a special room dedicated to silverware containing a collection of silver adornments.
