= Songgwangmae Memorial Museum =

Museum in Daegu, South Korea

Coordinates: 35.9976°N 128.6140°E

- Hangul: 송광매기념관
- Hanja: 松光梅紀念館
- Revised Romanization: Songgwangmae ginyeomgwan
- McCune–Reischauer: Songgwangmae kinyŏmgwan

Songgwangmae Memorial Museum (aka Songgwang Maewon, Korean: 송광매기념관) is a museum located in Dong district, Daegu, South Korea.

The museum's collection is mainly artifacts connected with traditional arts and industry in Korea. The founders of museum were Kwon Byeongtak and Song Suhee. The establishment of the museum was approved in March 2002.
