= The Piermaster's House =

Former piermaster's house in the Albert Dock, Liverpool, England which is now a museum

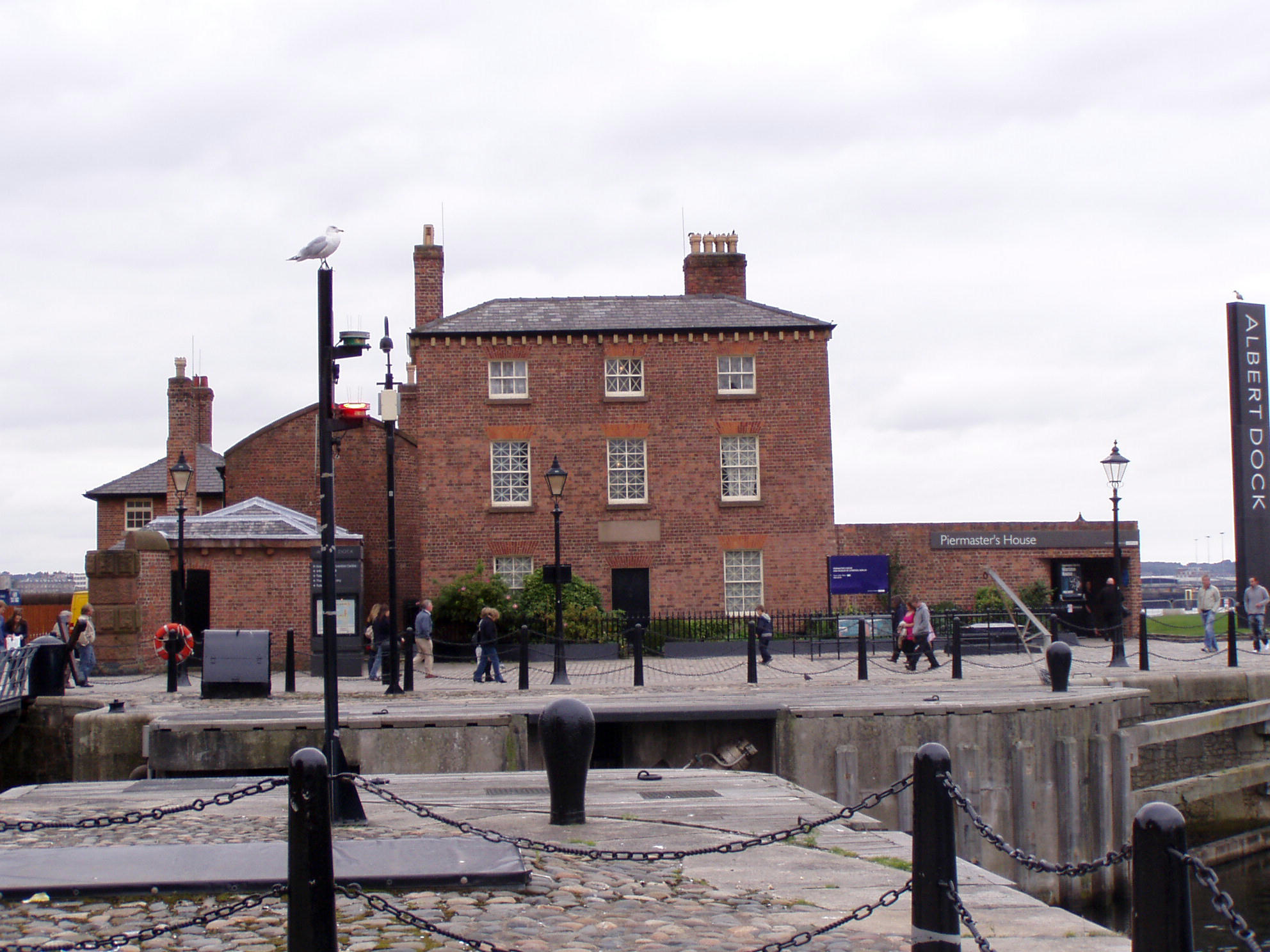
- Interactive map of the The Piermaster's House area

General information
- Architectural style: Victorian, Gothic revival
- Location: Albert Dock, Liverpool, England
- Coordinates: 53°24′4.619″N 2°59′40.502″W
- Completed: 1852

The Piermaster's House is a 19th-century Grade II listed building located within the Albert Dock in Liverpool, England. Built in 1852 to house the piermaster and his family the building now serves as part of the Museum of Liverpool showcasing a 1940s wartime interior. In 2019 it welcomed 89,140 visitors.

In 2022 it was announced that the building, along with its neighbours Mermaid House and the Cooperage would be redeveloped into a food and beverage outlet.

== Bibliography ==
- Sharples, Joseph (2004). Liverpool: Pevsner City Guide. Yale University Press. ISBN 978-0300102581.
