= National Ethnographic Museum (Guinea-Bissau) =

Museu Etnográfico Nacional da Guiné-Bissau
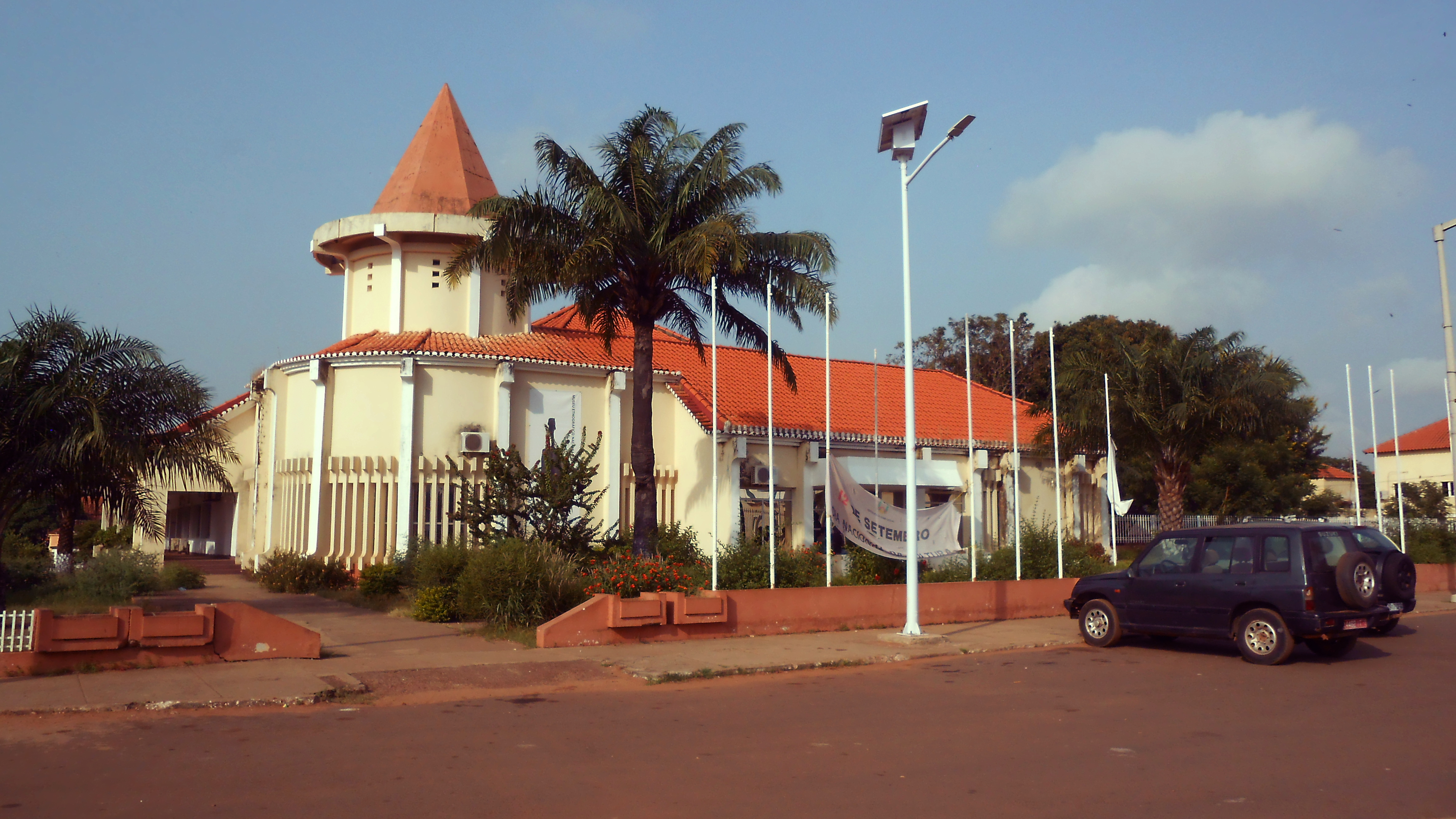
- Location: Guinea-Bissau
- Coordinates: 11°51′25″N 15°36′39″W
- Location of National Ethnographic Museum

National Ethnographic Museum is the national ethnographic museum of Guinea-Bissau. It is situated in Bissau, and is one of two major museums in the country. As of 1998 it had a library of 14,000 volumes.
