= National Lighthouse Museum, Pohang =

Museum in Pohang, South Korea

Coordinates: 36.0778°N 129.5683°E

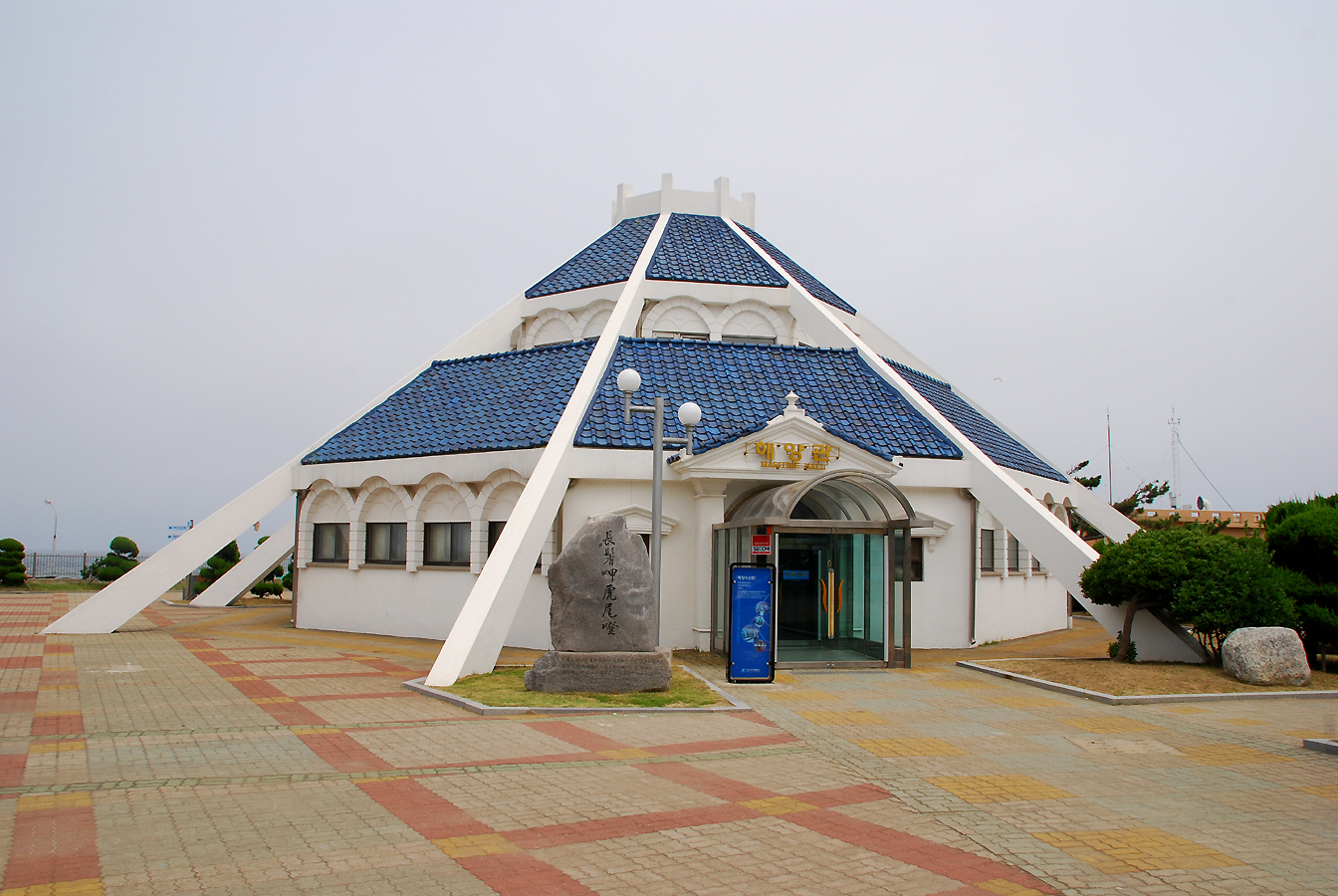
Homigot Lighthouse

The National Lighthouse Museum (Korean: 국립등대박물관; Hanja: 國立燈臺博物館) is a lighthouse museum in Pohang, North Gyeongsang Province, South Korea.

== History ==
The museum was opened in 1985.
