= Lists of buildings and structures =

This is a list of list of buildings and nonbuilding structures.

The Burj Khalifa, the world's tallest structure.

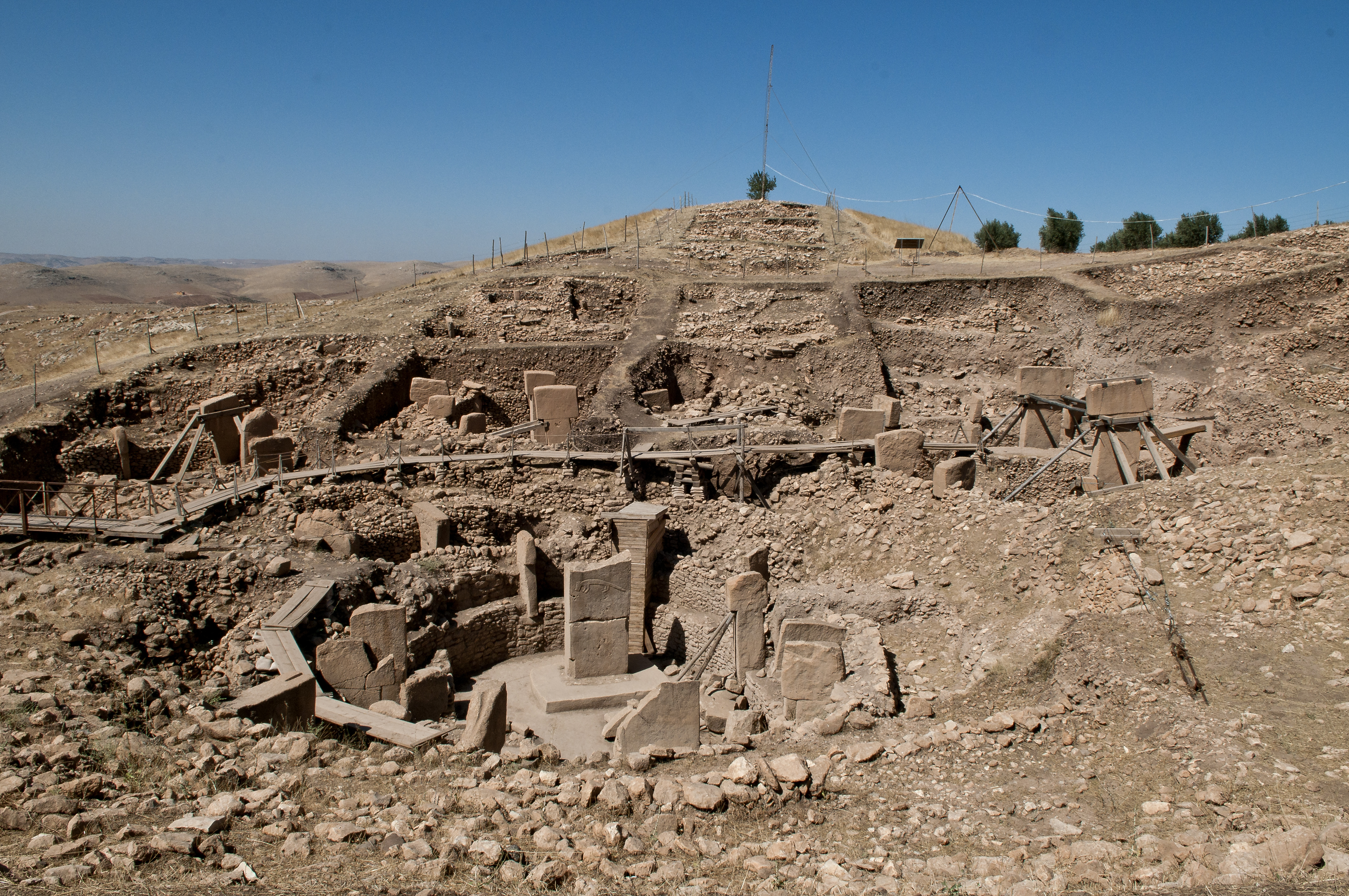
The Göbekli Tepe, believed to be the world's oldest manmade structure.

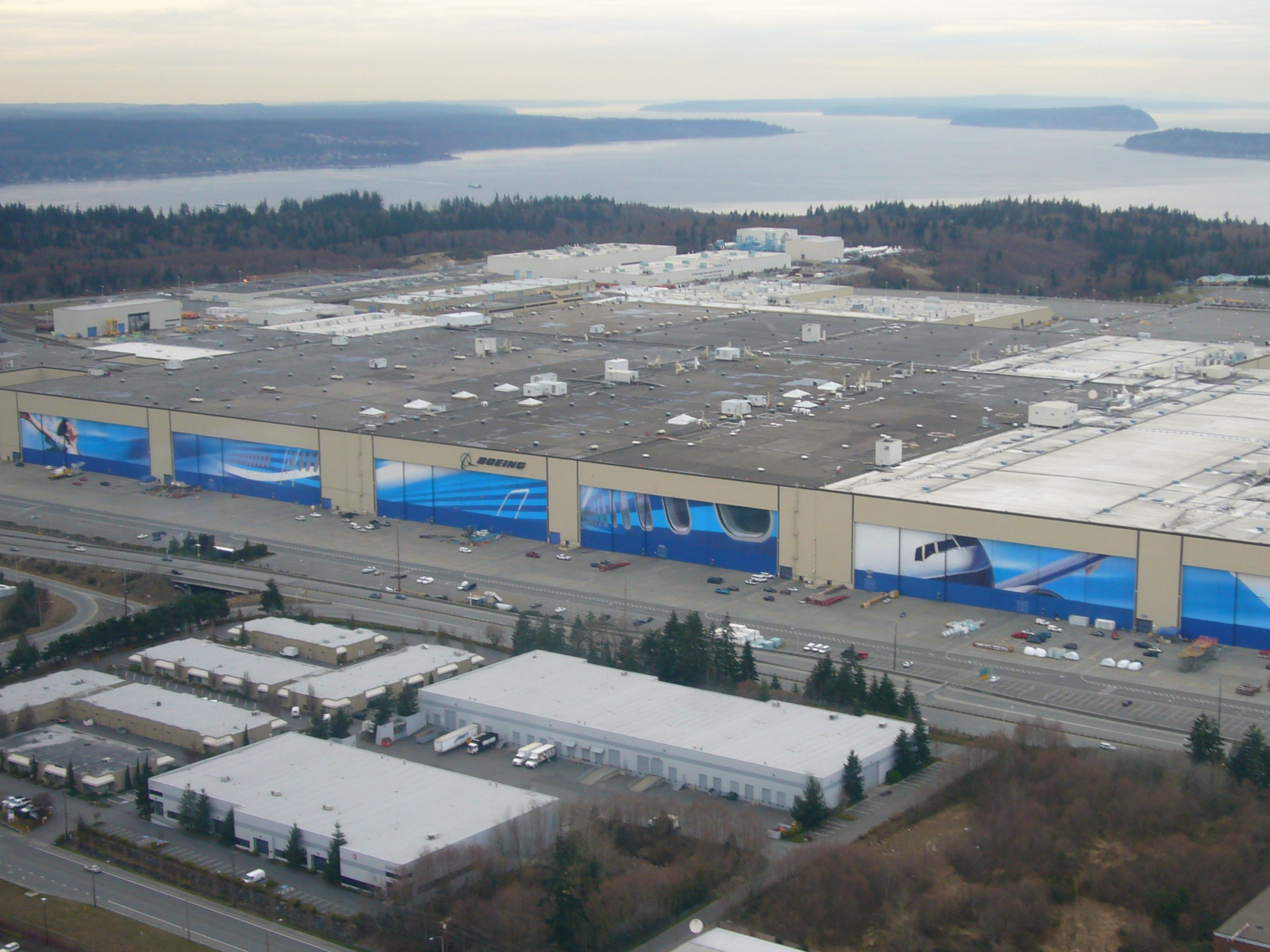
The Boeing Everett Factory, the world's largest building by volume.

== By type ==
- List of abbeys and priories
- List of amphitheatres (contemporary)
- List of amphitheatres (Roman)
- List of ancient Greek theatres
- List of ancient pyramids
  - List of Egyptian pyramids
- List of ancient spiral stairs
- List of ancient temple structures
  - List of Ancient Greek temples
  - List of Ancient Roman temples
- List of ancient watermills
- List of aquaria
- List of aqueducts
  - List of Roman aqueducts by date
  - List of aqueducts in the city of Rome
  - List of aqueducts in the Roman Empire
- List of archaeological sites sorted by country
- List of association football stadiums by capacity
- List of basilicas
  - List of Roman basilicas
- List of bridges
  - List of Roman bridges
- List of Buddhist temples
- List of casinos
- List of castles
- List of cathedrals
- List of churches
- Lists of clubhouses
  - List of Ancient Order of United Workmen buildings
  - List of American Legion buildings
  - List of Czech-Slovak Protective Society buildings
  - List of traditional gentlemen's and working men's club buildings
  - List of Elks buildings
  - List of Fraternal Order of Eagles buildings
  - List of Grange Hall buildings
  - List of Hibernian buildings
  - List of Knights of Columbus buildings
  - List of Knights of Pythias buildings
  - List of Masonic buildings
  - List of Odd Fellows buildings
  - List of Sons of Norway buildings
  - List of women's clubs
  - List of Woodmen of the World buildings
  - List of YMCA buildings
  - List of YWCA buildings
  - List of Z.C.B.J. buildings
- List of concert halls
- List of dams
  - List of Roman dams and reservoirs
- List of domes
  - List of Roman domes
- List of fortifications
- List of forts
- Lists of Hindu temples
- List of historic houses
- List of hotels
- List of hospitals
- List of indoor arenas
- List of Jain temples
- List of jazz clubs
- List of legislative buildings
- List of libraries
- List of lighthouses
- List of Major League Baseball stadiums
- List of masts
- List of mosques
- List of movie theaters
- List of museums
- List of nuclear reactors
- List of observatories
- List of opera houses
- List of palaces
- List of pioneering solar buildings
- List of prisons
- List of Roman public baths
- List of Roman theatres
- List of Roman triumphal arches
- List of shrines
- List of stadiums
- List of sugar refineries
- List of synagogues
- List of temples (LDS Church)
- List of theatres
- List of towers
- List of walls
- List of windmills
- List of zoos
- Listed buildings

== By age ==
- List of oldest buildings
  - List of oldest buildings in Canada
  - List of oldest structures in Toronto
  - List of oldest buildings in Britain
  - List of oldest buildings in Scotland
  - List of oldest buildings in United States of America

== By region ==
- List of Ahmadiyya buildings and structures
- List of buildings and structures in the Australian Capital Territory
- List of buildings and structures in Benin
- List of buildings and structures in Burundi
- List of buildings and structures in Cape Verde
- List of buildings and structures in the Central African Republic
- List of buildings and structures in Chad
- List of buildings and structures in Como
- List of buildings and structures in the Comoros
- List of buildings and structures in Djibouti
- List of buildings and structures in Eritrea
- List of buildings and structures in Florence
- List of buildings and structures in Gabon
- List of buildings and structures in the Gambia
- List of buildings and structures in Guimarães
- List of buildings and structures in Guinea
- List of buildings and structures in Guinea-Bissau
- List of buildings and structures in Hong Kong
- List of buildings and structures in Libya
- List of buildings and structures in Mali
- List of buildings and structures in Namibia
- List of buildings and structures in Niger
- List of buildings and structures in Puerto Rico
- List of buildings and structures in Santiago, Cape Verde
- List of buildings and structures in São Tomé and Príncipe
- List of buildings and structures in São Vicente, Cape Verde
- List of buildings and structures in Singapore
- List of buildings and structures in Saint Petersburg
- List of buildings and structures in Swansea
- List of buildings and structures in Venice
- List of buildings in and around Copenhagen
- List of buildings in Belgrade
- List of buildings in Bucharest
- List of buildings in Cairo
- List of buildings in Dubai
- List of buildings in Ireland
- List of buildings in Laredo, Texas
- List of buildings in Milan
- List of buildings in Ottawa
- List of notable Puerto Rican buildings and structures
- List of structures in London

== By architect ==
- List of buildings by Friedensreich Hundertwasser
- List of buildings by Frank Pierce Milburn
- List of buildings by Francis Petre
- List of Le Corbusier buildings
- List of Gaudí buildings
- List of Oscar Niemeyer works
- List of Jean Nouvel works
- List of I. M. Pei projects
- List of Frank Lloyd Wright works
- List of works by Norman Foster
- List of works by Frank Gehry
- List of works by Charles Holden
- List of works by Edwin Lutyens
- List of works by César Pelli
- List of works by Renzo Piano
- List of works by Rafael Viñoly
- List of works by Minoru Yamasaki

== By building material ==
- List of Brick Gothic buildings
- List of Brick Romanesque buildings
- List of cobblestone buildings

== Other ==
- List of works similar to the 2020 Utah monolith
- List of buildings and structures illustrated on banknotes
- List of most expensive buildings
- List of octagonal buildings and structures
- List of twisted buildings
- List of visionary tall buildings and structures

== See also ==
- World Heritage Site
