= List of buildings and structures in Niger =

A list of notable buildings and structures in Niger:

== Agadez ==
- Agadez Mosque
- Taguelmoust

== Niamey ==
- Niamey Grand Mosque
- Stade General Seyni Kountche
- Niamey Grand Market
- National Assembly of Niger
- Diori Hamani International Airport
- Abdou Moumouni University
- Sahel Academy
- Higher Institute of Mining, Industry and Geology
- National Hospital
- Lamordé University Hospital.
- American International School of Niamey
- Lycée La Fontaine

== Yaama ==
- Yamma Mosque
