= List of buildings and structures in Chad =

A list of notable buildings and structures in Chad:

== N'Djamena ==
- National Assembly
- Chad National Museum
- Kempinski Hotel N'Djamena
