= List of buildings in and around Copenhagen =

Copenhagen is the location of many notable buildings, representing a variety of eras as well as functions.

== Castles and palaces ==
Castle/palace	Location	Year	Style
Amalienborg	Frederiksstaden	1750-60	Rococo
Rosenborg Castle	Indre By	1606-24	Renaissance
Christiansborg Palace	Indre By	1828/1928	Neo-baroque
Frederiksborg Palace	Hillerød	1560/1602-20	Renaissance
Fredensborg Palace	Fredensborg	1702-26	Baroque
Kronborg Castle	Helsingør	1585 ^{*}	Renaissance
Frederiksberg Palace	Frederiksberg	1703	Italian Baroque
The Erimitage Palace	Dyrehaven	1734	Baroque
Dragsholm Castle		1215	?

* Around 1420 a fortress was built where Kronborg is located today.

== Churches ==
Church	Location	Year	Style
Church of Holmen	Slotsholmen	1560/1602-20	Renaissance
Church of Our Saviour	Christianshavn	1695	Dutch baroque
Christian's Church	Christianshavn	1758	Baroque
Marble Church	Frederiksstaden	1770/1894	Historicism
Church of Our Lady	Indre By	1829	Neoclassicism
Jesus Church	Valby	1891	Historicism
Grundtvig's Church	Bispebjerg	1926	Expressionism, Neo-Gothic
Trinitatis Church	Indre By	1635 / 1731	Baroque

== Secular buildings ==
Building	Location	Year	Style
Ny Carlsberg Glyptotek	Indre By	1882	Renaissance inspired
Børsen, (until 1996 the stock market building)	Slotsholmen	1640	Dutch baroque
Tivoli Gardens	Indre By	1843	amusement park
Dyrehavsbakken	Klampenborg, at the City's northern border	1583	the oldest amusement park in the world
Royal Danish Theatre	Indre By	1748 Old scene, 1874 New scene	Neoclassicism (?)
Assistens Cemetery	Nørrebro	1760, (1706 as temporary plague cemetery)	cemetery where many famous Danes rest^{*}
Rundetårn	Indre By	1642	fortress tower, the highest building in the world without stairs
City Hall	Indre By	1905	National Romantic style
Old City Hall	Indre By	1815	?
Copenhagen Central Station	Indre By/Vesterbro	1911	?
Østerport Station	Østerbro	1897	interesting interior

* e.g. fairy tales author Hans Christian Andersen and scientists Niels Bohr and Hans Christian Ørsted

== Fountains and monuments ==
Fountain/monument	Location	Year	Artist
Caritas Well	Indre By	1608	
Gefion Fountain	Indre By		
Stork Fountain	Indre By	1894	
The Little Mermaid	Indre By	1913	
Troll that smells Christian blood	Indre By	1896	

== Contemporary architecture ==
Building	Location	Year	Architect
The Black Diamond	Indre By	1999	Schmidt hammer lassen
Danish Jewish Museum	Indre By	2004	Daniel Libeskind
VM Houses	Ørestad	2005	Bjarke Ingels/Julien de Smedt
Gemini Residence	Islands Brygge	2005	MVRDV
Copenhagen Opera House	Holmen	2005	Henning Larsen
Tietgenkollegiet	Ørestad	2006	Lundgaard & Tranberg
Royal Playhouse	Frederiksstaden	2008	Lundgaard & Tranberg
Mountain Dwellings	Ørestad	2008	Bjarke Ingels
Metropolis	Kongens Enghave	2008	Future Systems
The Elephant House	Frederiksberg	2008	Foster + Partners
Copenhagen Concert Hall	Ørestad	2009	Jean Nouvel
National Aquarium Denmark	Kastrup	2014	building similar to Guggenheim in Bilbao
Parken Footballstadium	Østerbro	1992 (originally opened in 1911)	will be used for four matches in Euro 2020
Radisson Blu Royal Hotel	Indre By/Vesterbro	1960	by Arne Jacobsen
