= List of buildings and structures in Burundi =

A list of notable buildings and structures in Burundi:

== Bujumbura ==
=== Museums and monuments ===
- Burundi Geological Museum
- Livingstone-Stanley Monument

=== Universities and education ===
- Hope Africa University
- University of Burundi

=== Other ===
- Intwari Stadium

== Gitega ==
- Burundi Museum of Life
- Burundi National Museum
