= Lycée La Fontaine (Niger) =

French international school in Niamey, Niger

Coordinates: 13.5213°N 2.1012°E

Lycée La Fontaine in Niamey, Niger, is a French-speaking international school attached to the French Embassy. It was established in 1962. In 2021 it had some 876 students (32% French, 68% local and from other countries) and 56 educators.

It is directly operated by the Agency for French Education Abroad (AEFE), an agency of the French government.

The school takes students from primary to lycée (high school) level.

It has been closed since 2024, in the wake of the 2023 coup d'état.

== See also ==
- American International School of Niamey - American school
