= List of buildings and structures in Gabon =

A list of notable buildings and structures in Gabon:

- Léon-Mba International Airport
- Libreville Hospital

== See also ==
- Category:Buildings and structures in Libreville
