= Ledger Plaza Hotel N'Djamena =

Coordinates: 12.1297°N 15.0778°E

- Interactive map of the Ledger Plaza Hotel N'Djamena area

General information
- Type: Hotel
- Location: N'Djamena, Chad
- Completed: 2004
- Opening: 2004

Technical details
- Floor count: 9

The Ledger Plaza Hotel N'Djamena, formerly the Kempinski Hotel N'Djamena, is a luxury hotel in N'Djamena, the capital of Chad. It is located in the city center of N'Djamena, near Quartier Diguel Est. The hotel opened in 2004. It features 177 rooms and suites.

== Gallery ==
The main entrance to the Kempinski Hotel N'Djamena

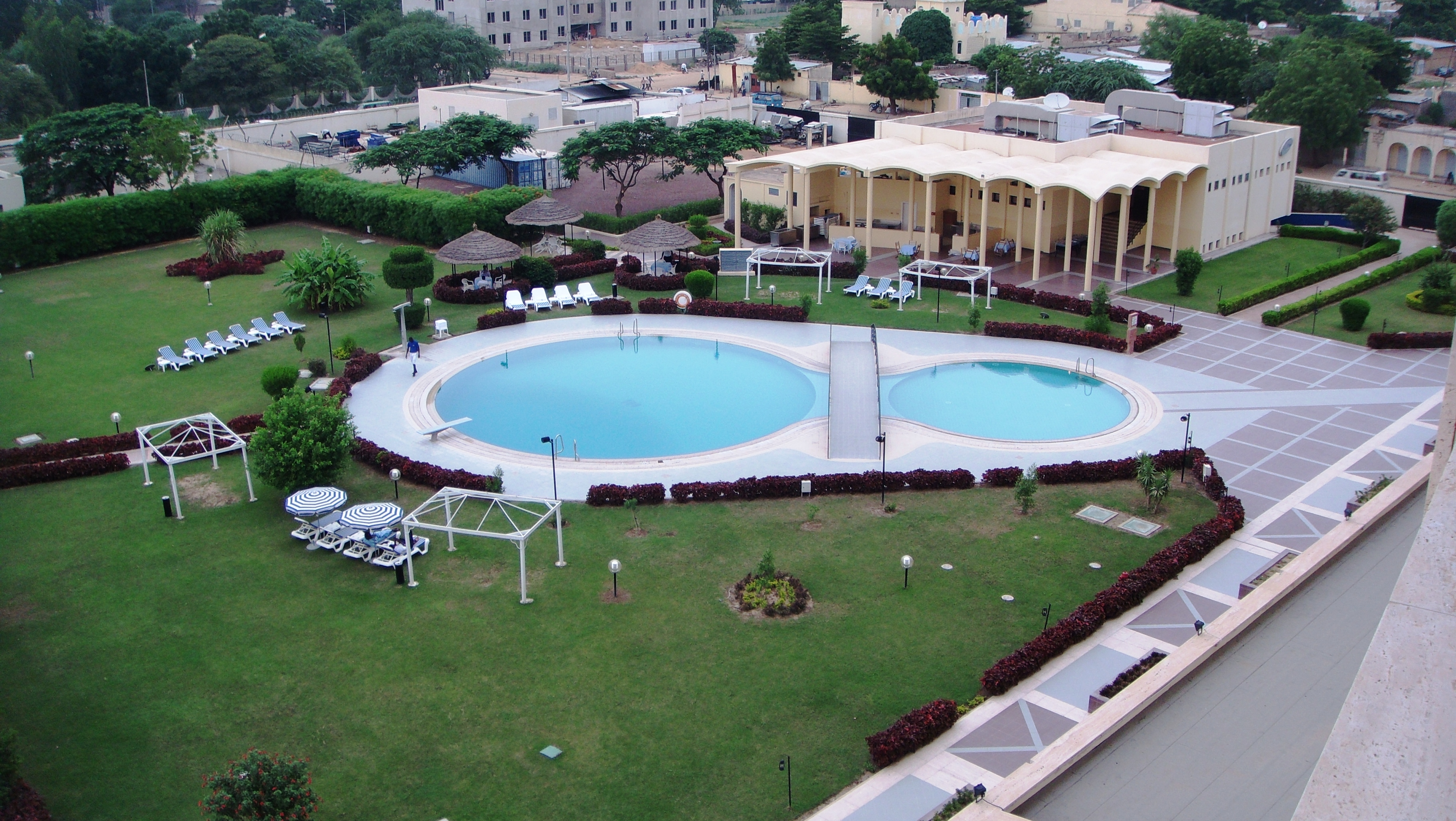
The hotel pool

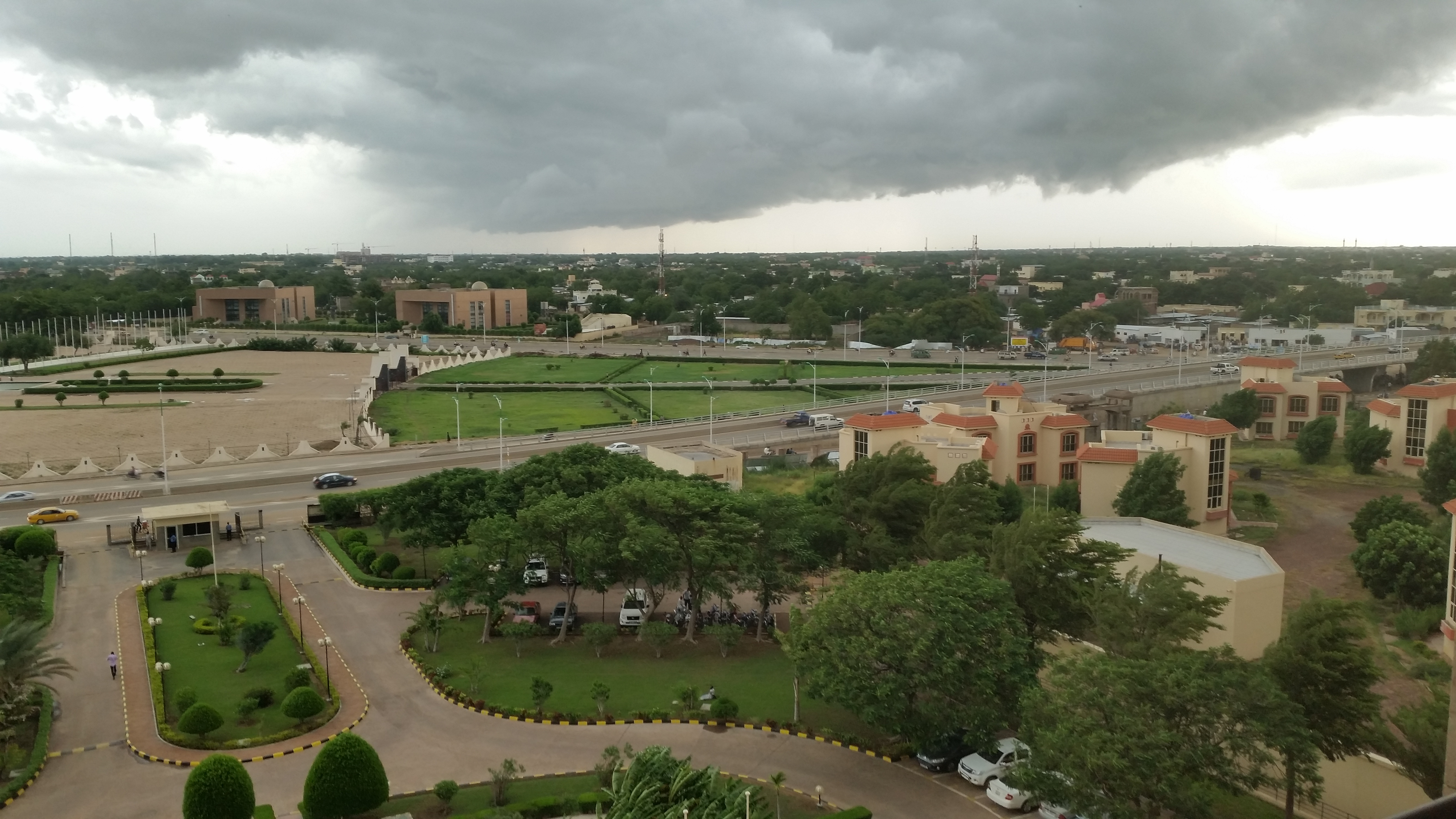
View from the hotel to the National Museum and National Library of Chad
