= List of Jean Nouvel works =

Chronological list of buildings, projects and other works by Jean Nouvel.

Name	City	Country	Designed	Completed	Other Information	Image
Plateau Beaubourg	Paris	France		1971		
Baillais Printing House	Paris	France	1971	1972		
Delbigot Residence	Villeneuve-sur-Lot	France	1970	1973		
Delanghe Residence	Périgueux	France	1970	1974		
Kindergarten School	Trélissac	France	1972	1974		
Trocadero Library	Paris	France	1975	1976		
Dick Residence	Troyes	France	1976	1978		
Devoldere Residence	Troyes	France	1978	1979		
Val-Notre-Dame Clinic	Bezons	France	1976	1979		
Collège Anne Franck	Antony	France	1978	1980		
Péniche Club de Presse Renault	Paris	France	1981	1982		
SEA Center	Kerjouanno	France	1981	1982		
Yves Dauge Offices	Paris	France		1983		
Les Godets	Antony	France	1980	1984		
Municipal Theater	Belfort	France	1980	1984	Renovation	
Sport Center	Nîmes	France	1986	1986		
Gymnase du Luzard	Marne-la-Vallée	France	1981	1986		
Dhuoda	Nîmes	France		1987		
Nemausus 1	Nîmes	France	1985	1987	housing	
Arab World Institute	Paris	France	1981	1987		
Social-housing	Saint-Ouen	France	1982	1987		
La Coupole	Combs-la-Ville	France		1987		
Galleries Bailly	Paris	France	1987	1988		
Hit Parade	Paris	France	1987	1988		
Onyx	Saint-Herblain	France	1987	1988		
Hôtel Saint-James	Bouliac	France	1987	1989		
INIST office	Nancy	France	1985	1989		
ADP Offices	Paris	France		1989		
Bailly Apartments	Paris	France		1989		
Interdica	Freiburg	Germany	1989	1990		
Poulain	Blois	France	1989	1991		
Pierre & Vacances Housing	Cap d'Ail	France	1987	1991		
Hôtel des Thermes	Dax	France		1992		
Perception	Hérouville-Saint-Clair	France		1992		
CLMBBDO Office	Issy-les-Moulineaux	France		1992		
Bus Terminal	Tours	France	1990	1992		
ZAC Parmentier Housing	Bezons	France		1993		
Renovation of the Opéra Nouvel	Lyon	France	1985	1993		
Vesunna Gallo-Roman Museum	Périgueux	France		1993		
Cartier CTL	Saint-Imier	Switzerland		1993		
VINICI Conference Center	Tours	France	1989	1993		
Housing	Tours	France		1993		
Tourism Office	Tours	France	1989	1993		
Parking	Tours	France		1993		
Social Center	Hérouville-Saint-Clair	France		1994		
Pôle de Lanaud, Genoscope (Office)	Boisseuil	France		1994		
Fondation Cartier pour l'Art Contemporain	Paris	France	1991	1994		
Galeries Lafayette	Berlin	Germany	1991	1996		
Euralille	Lille	France	1991	1995		
Musée de la Publicité	Paris	France	1997	1998		
Interunfall	Bregenz	Austria	1995	1999		
Foundation Cognac-Jay	Rueil-Malmaison	France		1999		
Schutzenberger Brewery	Strasbourg	France	1998	1999		
Lucerne Culture and Congress Centre	Lucerne	Switzerland	1993	2000		
The Hotel (reconstruction)	Lucerne	Switzerland	1998	2000		
Science Park	Mons	Belgium	1997	2000		
Palais de Justice	Nantes	France	1993	2000		
KölnTurm	Cologne	Germany	1998	2001		
Gasometer	Vienna	Austria	1995	2001		
Zlatý Anděl (Office / Retail)	Prague	Czech Republic	1995	2001		
Dentsu Building	Tokyo	Japan	1998	2002		
Monolith of Expo.02	Murten	Switzerland		2002		
Torre Agbar (Office)	Barcelona	Spain		2003		
Technology Center	Wismar	Germany	1998	2003		
Museum Two, Leeum, Samsung Museum of Art	Seoul	South Korea	1997	2004		
Reina Sofía Museum expansion	Madrid	Spain	1999	2005		
Puerta América Hotel	Madrid	Spain	2003	2005		
Musée du quai Branly	Paris	France	1999	2006		
Guthrie Theater	Minneapolis	USA		2006		
Pavilion B, Genoa Exhibition Centre	Genoa	Italy		2008		
40 Mercer Street Residences	New York City	US		2008		
100 Eleventh Avenue	New York City	US		2009		
Copenhagen Concert Hall	Copenhagen	Denmark		2009		
Serpentine Gallery	London	UK		2010	Temporary	
Hotel Sofitel	Vienna	Austria	2004	2010		
One New Change	London	UK	2003	2010		
Burj Qatar	Doha	Qatar	2003	2012		
Tour Bleue	Charleroi	Belgium		2015		
Entrance of the Design Museum Brussels	Brussels	Belgium		2015		
Baku Museum of Modern Art	Baku	Azerbaijan		2010		
53W53	New York	US	2008	2018		
National Museum of Qatar	Doha	Qatar	2010	2019		
Museum of Art Pudong	Shanghai	China	2015	2021		
TAG Art Museum	Qingdao	China	2013	2021		
