= List of buildings and structures in the Central African Republic =

A list of notable buildings and structures in the Central African Republic:

== Bangui ==
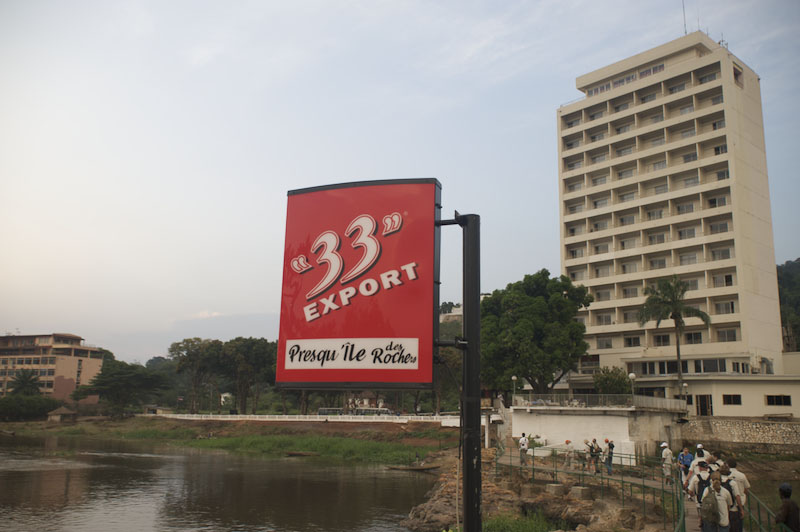
Bangui Hotel
