= List of buildings and structures in Guinea-Bissau =

Notable buildings in Guinea-Bissau

A list of notable buildings and structures in Guinea-Bissau:

== Bissau ==
=== Education and culture ===
- Guinea-Bissau National Ethnographic Museum
- Universidade Amílcar Cabral
- Universidade Colinas de Boé

=== Hotels ===
- Hotel Hotti Bissau

=== Palaces, forts and memorials ===
- Fortaleza de São José da Amura
- Presidential Palace, Bissau

=== Places of worship ===
- Bissau Cathedral
- Igreja Universal do Reino de Deus

=== Transport ===
- Osvaldo Vieira International Airport
- Port of Bissau

=== Other ===
- Hospital Nacional Simão Mendes
- Estadio Lino Correia

== Bafatá ==
- Bafatá Airport
