= American International School of Niamey =

International school in Niamey, Niger

Coordinates: 13.526728°N 2.074611°E

Location
- Niamey; Niger

Information
- School type: International School
- Established: 1982; 43 years ago
- Grades: Pre-K - Grade 12
- Language: English
- Website: https://aisniamey.org/

American International School of Niamey is an American international school in Niamey, Niger. It serves grades pre-Kindergarten through 12th grade. The school was established in 1982.

== See also ==
- Lycée La Fontaine (Niger) - French school
