= List of works by Rafael Viñoly =

This list of works by Rafael Viñoly categorizes the Uruguayan architect's work.

== Completed ==
- Prourban Tower, Libertador 442, Retiro, Buenos Aires, 1983
- Physical Education Facility, Lehman College, Bronx, New York, 1994
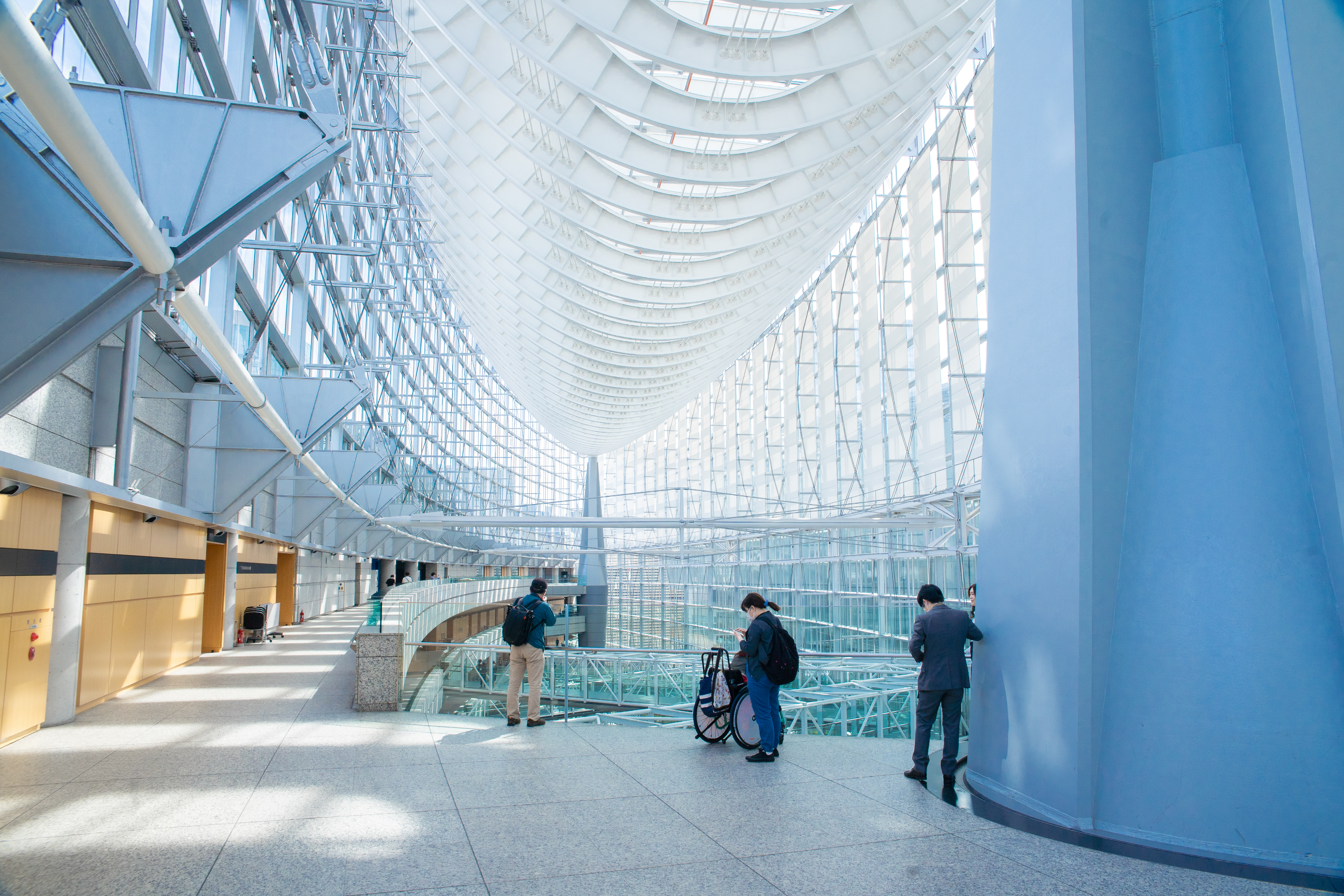
- Tokyo International Forum in Tokyo
  Tokyo International Forum, Tokyo, Japan, 1996
- Bronx Housing Court, Bronx, New York, 1997
- Princeton Stadium, Princeton University, Princeton, New Jersey, 1998
- Jongno Tower in Seoul, South Korea, 1999
- Lamont–Doherty Earth Observatory, Columbia University, Palisades, New York, 2000
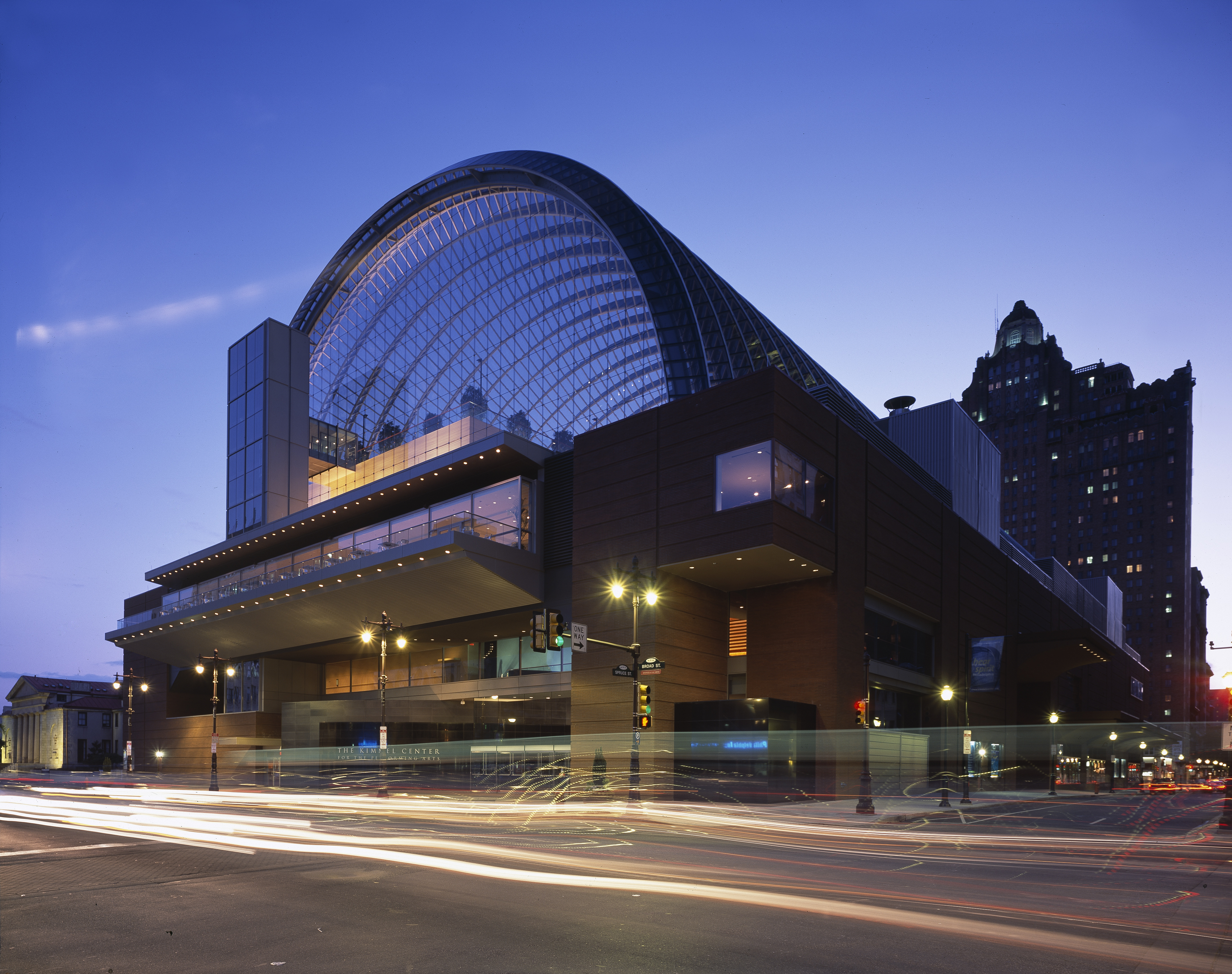
- Kimmel Center for the Performing Arts in Philadelphia
  The Kimmel Center for the Performing Arts, Philadelphia, Pennsylvania, 2001
- Van Andel Institute, Grand Rapids, Michigan, 2002
- Watson Institute for International Studies, Brown University, Providence, Rhode Island, 2002
- Viñoly Tower, Gelly 3690, Palermo, Buenos Aires, 2002
- Westgate Building, Pennsylvania State University, University Park, Pennsylvania, 2003
- David L. Lawrence Convention Center, Pittsburgh, Pennsylvania, 2003
- Carl Icahn Laboratory, Lewis Sigler Institute for Integrative Genomics, Princeton University, Princeton, New Jersey, 2004
- University of Chicago Booth School of Business, Chicago, Illinois, 2004
- Boston Convention and Exhibition Center, Boston, Massachusetts, 2004
- National Institutes of Health, John Edward Porter Neurosciences Research Center, Bethesda, Maryland, 2004
- Jazz at Lincoln Center, New York, New York, 2004
- Nasher Museum of Art, Duke University, Durham, North Carolina, 2005
- Mahler 4 Office Tower, Amsterdam, Netherlands, 2005
- Howard Hughes Medical Institute, Janelia Research Campus, Ashburn, Virginia, 2006
- Wageningen University and Research Centre, Atlas Building, Wageningen, Netherlands, 2006
- Gabrielle H. Reem and Herbert J. Kayden Center for Science and Computation, Bard College, Annandale-on-Hudson, New York, 2007
- Bronx County Hall of Justice, Bronx, New York, 2007
- California NanoSystems Institute, University of California Los Angeles, Los Angeles, California, 2007
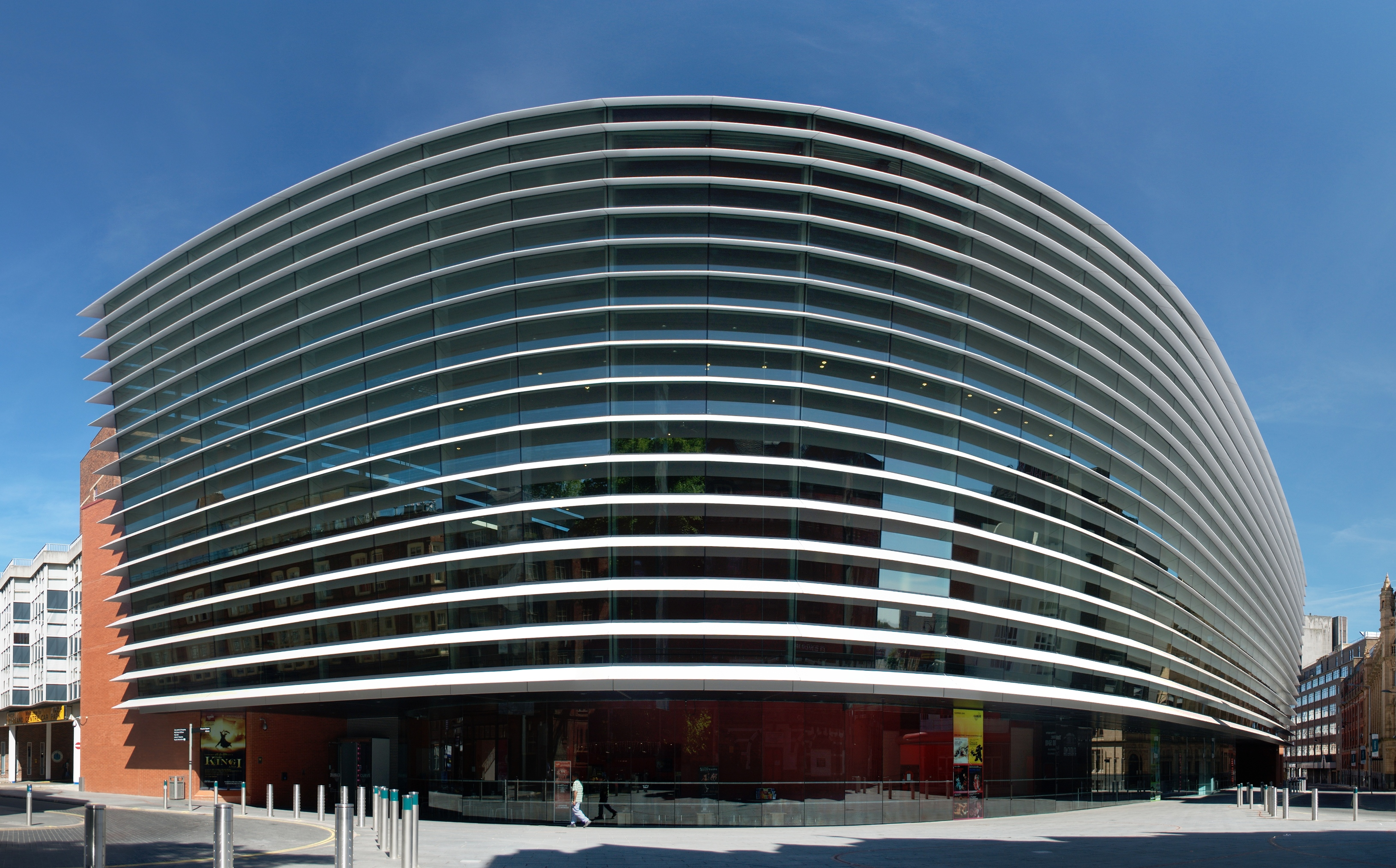
- Curve in Leicester, England
  Curve, Leicester, England, 2008
- Fortabat Museum, Olga Cossettini 141, Puerto Madero, Buenos Aires, 2008
- Brooklyn Children's Museum, Brooklyn, N.Y., 2008 (expansion)
- Edificio Acqua, Punta del Este, Uruguay, 2008
- Helen Diller Family Cancer Research Building, University of California, San Francisco, San Francisco, California, 2008
- Perelman Center for Advanced Medicine, University of Pennsylvania Health System, Philadelphia, Pennsylvania, 2008
- New Terminal at Carrasco International Airport, Montevideo, Uruguay, 2009
- West Quad Building, Brooklyn College, Brooklyn, N.Y., 2009
- City College of New York Spitzer School of Architecture, Urban Design, and Landscape Architecture, New York City, 2009
- Vdara Hotel & Spa at CityCenter, Paradise, Nevada, 2009

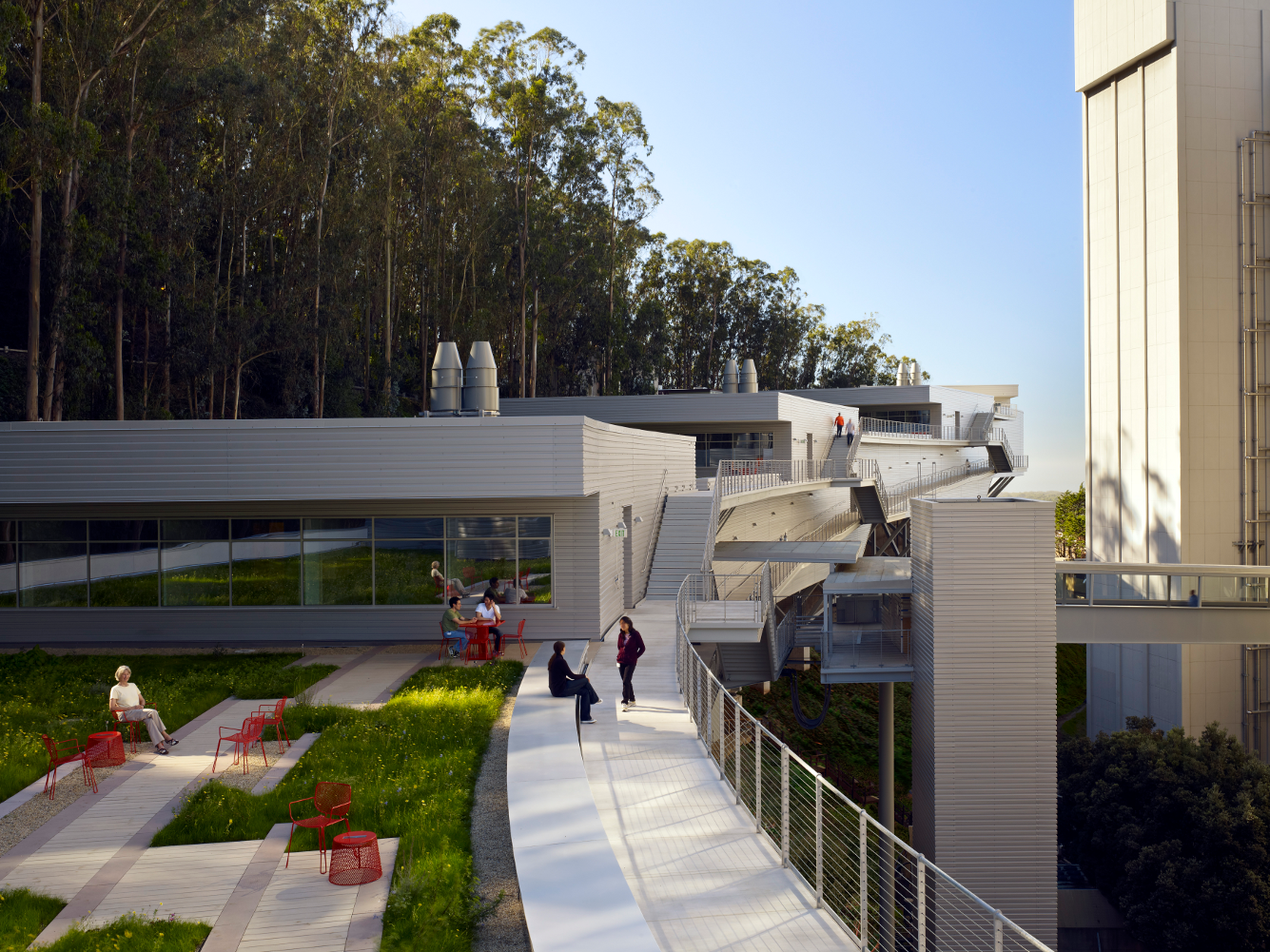
Institute for Regeneration Medicine Building, University of California San Francisco

- Institute for Regeneration Medicine Building, University of California San Francisco, San Francisco, California, 2010
- The Gateway, Al Raha Beach Development, Abu Dhabi, UAE, 2010
- South Texas Research Facility, University of Texas Health Science Center at San Antonio, San Antonio, Texas, 2010
- Firstsite:newsite Colchester Visual Arts Facility, Colchester, England, 25 September 2011
- University of Arizona Science Center, Tucson, Arizona, 2011
- Claremont McKenna College, Kravis Center, Claremont, California, 2011
- Madero Office Tower, Cecilia Grierson 355, Puerto Madero, Buenos Aires, 2011
- University of Chicago Medicine Center for Care and Discovery, Chicago, Illinois, 2012
- Mina Zayed Waterfront Development, Abu Dhabi, UAE, 2012
- University of Oxford Master Plan and Mathematics Institute, Oxford, England, 2013
- 121st Police Precinct Stationhouse, Staten Island, New York 2013
- Cleveland Museum of Art, Cleveland, Ohio, 2013 (expansion)
- Novartis Building 3, East Hanover, New Jersey, 2013
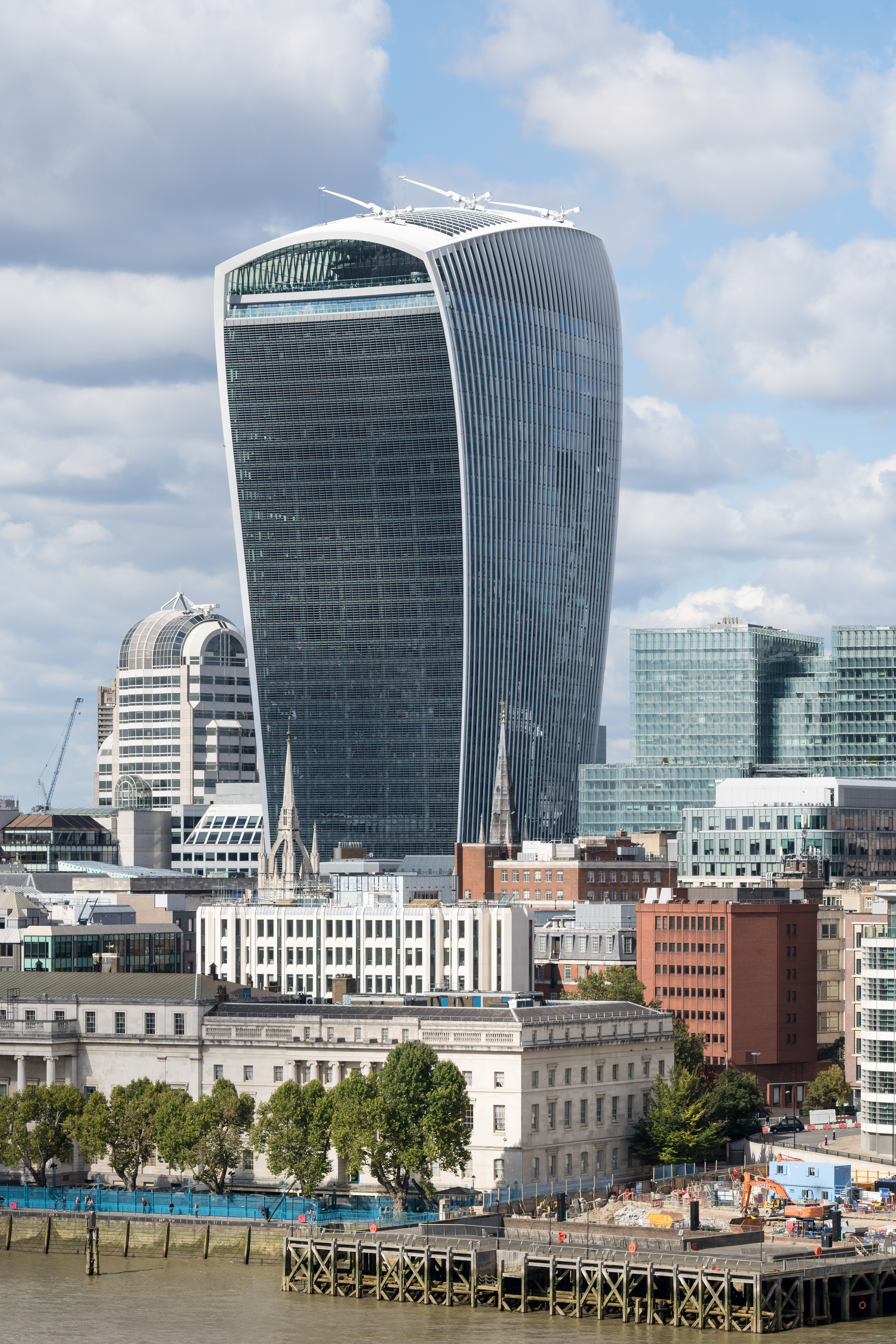
- 20 Fenchurch Street in London
  20 Fenchurch Street, London, England, 2014
- 432 Park Avenue, New York, New York, 2015
- Laguna Garzón Bridge, Uruguay, 2015
- Cero+Infinito, Faculty of Exact and Natural Sciences, Ciudad Universitaria, Buenos Aires, 2019
- Battersea Power Station Master Plan, London, England, 2020
- The Bryanston, London, England, 2020
- Frank J. Guarini Justice Complex, Jersey City, New Jersey, 2026

== In progress ==
- Edward M. Kennedy Institute for the United States Senate, Boston, Massachusetts, 2014
- Henry A. Jordan Medical Education Center, Perelman School of Medicine, University of Pennsylvania Health System, Philadelphia, Pennsylvania, 2014
- University of South Carolina, Darla Moore School of Business, Columbia, South Carolina, 2014
- 125 Greenwich Street, New York, 2015-2019
- The New Stanford Hospital, Stanford, California, 2015
- 1401 Spruce Street, Philadelphia, Pennsylvania, 2015
- Manchester City Football Club, Etihad Campus, 2012-2016
- 281 Fifth Avenue, a skyscraper in New York City
- NEMA Chicago, Chicago, Illinois, 2019
- Cipriani Towers, Punta del Este, 2027

== Major works ==
=== Argentina (1968–1979) ===
- Chamber of Deputies (House of Representatives, or Edificio Anexo de la Cámara de Diputados), Buenos Aires (1966)

Here, in the seat of Argentina's federal government, Viñoly adroitly harmonized a new, modern building (three interconnected blocks containing the representatives' offices, committee meeting rooms, offices for political parties, and a town hall for public meetings) with the existing Chamber of Deputies, on which it sits, and the Congress Building directly across from it, both of which are neoclassical in style. "The highly reflective glass cladding minimizes heat loading on the new construction" and, wittily, "allows it to assume the stylistic qualities of the surrounding buildings", which rather than being upstaged by Viñoly's update "are made more powerful and imposing by their reflected images. The Congress Building in particular thus takes on a heightened presence."

- UIA (Designed 1968; completed 1974)

Designed in 1968 and completed in 1974, the Buenos Aires headquarters of the Argentine Industrial Union (Spanish: Unión Industrial Argentina or UIA), the country's leading advocacy group for industrial manufacturers, helped establish Viñoly as a young architect to watch. According to the monograph Rafael Viñoly, El Edificio Carlos Pellegrini ("the Carlos Pellegrini Building") it marked the architect's "first success in a national design competition". By day, the entry notes, the building's "glass curtain wall...provides staff and visitors spectacular views of the city and the port; at night, it becomes highly transparent, offering equally dramatic views in the opposite direction by revealing the spaces and activities within." The "120-meter-tall pure glass prism" (Rafael Viñoly), which served as UIA's headquarters until 2001, is now regarded as a distinguishing feature of the city's skyline.

- Banco Ciudad de Buenos Aires (1968)

To commemorate its 90th anniversary (more accurately, the anniversary of the bank's nationalization and transferral, in 1888, to the city), the Banco Ciudad de Buenos Aires commissioned a new, more modern headquarters from MSGSSS. Built at breakneck speed by 1000 workers spread over three daily shifts in order to be ready for the building's planned opening in 1968, the project was completed in just six months. Inaugurated on 23 May 1968, the main office of the Banco Ciudad de Buenos Aires employed a traffic-stoppingly innovative design: the extensive use of glass bricks (a modernist trademark) and a glazed panel that gave on pedestrian traffic, signifying institutional transparency as well as accessibility to all Argentinians, regardless of socioeconomic class. The building "quickly gained international recognition", writes R. Stephen Sennott, in the Encyclopedia of Twentieth Century Architecture, "for its transparent use of light and color and for its strong volumetric articulation".

- Rioja Housing Project (1969)

Commissioned in 1969 and completed in 1973, the Rioja Housing Complex (Spanish: Conjunto Rioja) was developed by the Bank of the City of Buenos Aires as subsidized housing for 440 employee families. A mixed-use, high-density city within a city occupying 41,000 square meters (456,000 square feet), it incorporates commercial real estate, community spaces, and private residences in seven 18-story units clustered together and linked by 10 bridges to facilitate easy circulation. The design, as the authors of the monograph Rafael Viñoly point out, "combines high density with a layout meant to foster a strong sense of community. An open site allowing pedestrian traffic through most of its footprint creates a large public realm, while the presence of solaria, decks, shops, gardens, and other services throughout the project's multi-level internal circulation scheme encourages interaction among its inhabitants."

Viñoly and the other members of the Estudio de Arquitectura (later, MSGSSS) drew aesthetic as well as functional inspiration from Metabolism, a Japanese movement in architecture and urban planning that took its cues from natural forms and "organic growth patterns" (specifically, "tree imagery") (Rafael Viñoly). The Metabolists advocated for modular design based on "a core construction capable of branching", treelike, "and expanding over time" to create "flexible urban environments" able to keep pace with population growth and the shifting needs of an ever-changing metropolis. In its emphasis on flexible use, interactivity, and the easy circulation of foot traffic (between commercial, residential, and public spaces), the Rioja complex owes a debt to Metabolism.

- CASFPI (Caja de Ayuda y Subsidios Familiares para el Personal de la Industria, "Industrial Workers' Mutual Assistance and Family Subsidies Fund") Headquarters (1974)

Sited in Buenos Aires, this mixed-use headquarters for CASFPI, a union-funded association that provides aid, such as family subsidies, to industrial workers, houses medical services, a restaurant, an auditorium, and the association's offices. The innovative design breaks up the monotonous, oppressive regularity and rectilinearity of most such office towers, notes the Princeton Architectural Press monograph Rafael Viñoly, "by cutting away or pushing back the façade wherever the floor area of the roughly rectangular plan exceeds the programmatic requirements. The glazing of these irregular perforations creates multi-story sculptural objects that provide unexpected views of the city to those within the building, while revealing its internal spatial variety."

- Barrio ALUAR (Aluminio de Argentina) Factory Housing (1974)

Designed to foster community and facilitate circulation via pedestrian zones connecting the development's residences, landscaped plazas, playgrounds, and commercial spaces, the 222,200-foot ALUAR factory housing complex in Puerto Madryn, in the Argentinian province of Chubut, reflects the theoretical emphasis on social engineering that characterized public architecture in Argentina in the late 1960s. Barrio ALUAR provides housing for 750 employees and their families. As Viñoly himself noted, the site presented unique challenges: the harsh conditions of "the windswept Patagonian Desert near the Golfo Nuevo in central Argentina" contributes to "extremes of temperature and a steady wind that can reach 120 kilometers per hour," conditions that "inspired an inward-facing array of buildings that turn their backs to the wind to create a sheltered common core". The apartments, which come in a variety of layouts, are clustered in modules; the taller structures shield the modules as well as pedestrian zones. The aesthetics of everyday life are taken into consideration, too: "Each apartment in the complex opens onto an east-facing sheltered terrace with a view of the Atlantic Ocean, less than a kilometer away."

- Mendoza Stadium (1978)

Green-lighted as part of the construction boom in advance of the 1978 World Cup soccer championship, which Argentina had been tapped to host, the Estadio Malvinas Argentinas, in the province of Mendoza, was designed to hold more than 50,000 spectators in a bowl nestled in a natural depression in the foothills of the Andes. "The stadium's shallow, gently sloping bowl, the profile of the Andes, visible from most of the stands, and the unobtrusive security architecture combine to give the spectator a sense of being cradled within the landscape" (Rafael Viñoly). "Unusually, players and spectators are not separated by the high fence typical of contemporary stadia; instead, the field is protected by a low railing and a wide moat," making for less obstructed sightlines.

- ATC (Argentina Televisora Color) (1978)

Argentina's pledge to substantially upgrade its stadia and broadcast facilities played a key role in its winning bid to host the 1978 World Cup soccer championship. Of MSGSSS's World Cup-related projects (which include the Mendoza stadium and the renovation of the Rosario stadium), the ATC, the first color TV production center in Argentina, shows off—to dramatic effect—Viñoly's willingness to push the boundaries of the reigning modernist style while remaining sensitive to human use, cultural context, and the natural environment. Harmonizing with its parkland setting, the ATC is equal parts television production center and public plaza, a high-tech nerve center amid playgrounds, a reflecting pool, and an artificial stream (both of which act as "a natural heat exchange for the building's extensive ventilation and air-conditioning systems").

With only 16 months to go before the beginning of the World Cup, the design and construction of the Buenos Aires-based facility took place at a breakneck pace, necessitating what the Princeton Architectural Press monograph Rafael Viñoly calls "a radical amalgam of design and construction", an approach Viñoly would employ with stunning success in decades to come. Nimble, improvisatory, and, it turned out, an unlikely aid to inspiration, this "design/build" philosophy enabled him to adapt on the fly to unexpected developments in the construction process. "In command of a round-the-clock workforce that numbered up to 5,000 individuals" and under punishing time constraints, Viñoly "had no alternative but to pour foundations and begin erecting the building's steel frame with only a general notion of what the final architecture would be like," Rafael Viñoly notes. "As a result, the building is the product of an evolutionary process, a state of flux between design intention and construction reality."

Asked, in a 2008 interview, what his "defining" project was, the architect chose "the Argentina Color Television Center in Buenos Aires. I was in my early thirties and in control of everything. The building process was so unique. We started construction without really knowing what we were doing, and that [teaches] you a great deal." How, the interviewer wondered, "do you start construction without proper working drawings?" "Well, you put the grid on the site and just do it," was Viñoly's reply. "We built the project the way I think all buildings should be made – as a sort of improvisation on a set of working drawings. We just went to the site and said to the contractor: 'Do it from here to there.' We improvised so much, and that is what gave the building its freshness."

=== United States and abroad (1980–2023) ===
"By 1978, the Estudio de Arquitectura had designed 116 buildings and completed more than 50 of them, nearly all in Argentina", Suzanne Muchnic writes, in her Los Angeles Times profile of Viñoly. Argentina's hosting of the 1978 FIFA World Cup only two years after a brutal military junta had crushed Argentinian democracy is now regarded as the regime's attempt to legitimize itself, put a friendly face on its authoritarian rule, and whitewash its human-rights atrocities (such as the "disappearance"—abduction, torture, and, more often than not, murder—of thousands of Argentinians who opposed the junta). The organizing committee that commissioned Viñoly's design of the Mendoza stadium answered to the military dictatorship.

"Despite his success, Viñoly found himself working in an increasingly authoritative and oppressive society", writes Muchnic. "When he went home one day and discovered that his personal library had been searched and that some of his books in foreign languages had been deemed suspicious, he decided to leave the country". He landed a position as a visiting professor of architecture at Harvard University School of Design and, in 1979, moved his family to New York. Without a license to practice architecture in the States, he made ends meet by working as a developer and teaching architecture at various universities. "His first break", according to Muchnic, "was at the City University of New York's John Jay College of Criminal Justice".

- John Jay College of Criminal Justice, New York City (1986–88)

Hired to "convert a historic high school building into a research library" (Muchnic) at the City University of New York's John Jay College of Criminal Justice, Viñoly ended up designing a substantially expanded version of the original project, which evolved to include a theater, swimming pool, gymnasium, indoor track, and tennis courts.

As the monograph Rafael Viñoly notes, he had to serve two masters: "the college's need for a new and bigger building and the legal mandate to preserve a designated landmark, the Flemish Baroque exterior" of Haaren Hall, formerly the 1906 DeWitt Clinton High School, designed by Charles B. J. Snyder. "The new construction, both within and beyond the previous building envelope, acknowledges the rhythms and proportions of the original façade while effecting a transition" to Viñoly's "modern architectural vocabulary... The renovation inserted a sky-lit interior plaza within the high school's cast-iron columns and load-bearing masonry walls; around its perimeter is the college library, which includes one of the largest criminal justice collections in the United States".

Embracing the central atrium on two levels, the library is the building's conceptual anchor. "Upon entering the building, visitors are literally surrounded by the criminal justice library", notes the architect's website, "and can access all building functions directly from this day-lit space, which diffuses light throughout the rest of the College".

The first phase of a Herculean project whose master plan encompassed an entire block in Manhattan, The College of Criminal Justice was built in an astonishing 24 months on a fast-track schedule. It became an exemplar of the firm's approach: standing firm on design principles while collaborating with a project's stakeholders to arrive at ingenious, often highly innovative design solutions such as the central day-lit atrium, which won recognition from the Municipal Art Society and the City Club with two awards 1988 and 1989.

- Lehman College, APEX (Athletics and Physical Education Facility), Lehman College, The Bronx, New York City (1987–94)

"The point of this building appears to be the classical belief that the human form lies at the root of the idea of beauty," wrote Herbert Muschamp in his 1 May 1994 New York Times column on Viñoly's swooping, soaring P.E. facility for CUNY's Lehman College. The architect "employs no caryatids or Ionic orders to render this ancient concept," Muschamp observed. "Rather, he integrates engineering and esthetics into one impeccably toned physique."

Mr. Viñoly's design brings to mind the pivotal moment when Greek sculptors mastered the art of depicting the figure in motion. The esthetic apex of this Apex is the roof: a blocklong, aerodynamic arc of steel that rises gently over the campus treetops. ... While it contains no overtly symbolic forms, the entire building displays athletic poise under gravity's pressure. ... [T]hin clerestories...run the length of the roof, emphasizing gradual shifts in the trajectory of its curve, and by slight elevations in the roof line that define the building's entrance. The trusses convert lines of force into a delicate lattice. The subtext of the building, to borrow Kenneth Clark's terms, is the transformation of the merely naked into the nobly nude.

Comprising two basketball courts, a running track, an Olympic-size competition swimming pool, racquetball courts, dance studios, locker rooms, classrooms, and offices, Viñoly's 142,000-square-foot P.E. facility at Lehman College welcomes the college's community via a lobby framed by a cutout in the roof even as it beckons the surrounding community across its threshold on Bedford Park Boulevard, at the northern edge of the Lehman campus, by means of an "open plaza, aligned with the main campus walkway, [that] slips through the building, dividing it into wings and connecting the street entrance to the college's inner quadrangle" (Muschamp).

The traffic-stopping roof is a segmented, outward-bulging curve reminiscent in its dynamism of Eero Saarinen's gull-winged TWA Terminal; seen from the right angle, it looks airborne. Swooping nearly to ground level on the campus side and supported, on the street-facing side, by a concrete-and-glass section containing classrooms and administrative offices, the APEX's aerodynamic roof is sheathed in mill-finished stainless steel cladding. When the light is right, it assumes the color of the sky, performing an architectural vanishing act.

On the building's campus-facing side, the roof "ends just feet off the ground, over a row of clerestory windows for the underground gyms inside", writes David Bady, in an essay published on the Lehman College website. "The effect of the tilt is to put nearly the whole roof on view at once, so that it appears uncannily out of scale, like a work of nature, a tsunami wave or mountain ridge." Viñoly has described the building's profile as "more like geography than architecture". Visitors entering from the Bedford Park side pass "through the shadow beneath a suspended corridor and [emerge] onto an apron between descending hillsides of steel and glass," writes Bady. "There [they're] met by the vista down Lehman's main axis, thick with trees and bordered by Gothic towers. It's more than just a striking visual effect. ...Viñoly seems to be using architecture to represent the Bronx gaining access, by means of its civic institutions, to an ideal world."

- Tokyo International Forum, Tokyo, Japan (1989–96)

Erected where the old City Hall once stood, on an immense (6.7-acre) site in the Yūrakuchō business district, the Tokyo International Forum is "a prime venue for global events and cultural exchange", the architect's website informs; a sprawling multipurpose "civic complex that accommodates dance, musical, and theatrical performances, conventions and trade shows, business meetings, and receptions".

Organized by the Tokyo Metropolitan Government under the auspices of the Union Internationale des Architectes, the international competition to design the Forum opened in 1989. Applicants had their work cut out for them: bounded on the east by the curving viaduct of the famous "Bullet Train" and on the west by the moat and outer gardens of the Imperial Palace, the awkwardly shaped site defied cookie-cutter solutions. The facility's intended role as a nerve center of cultural life and commercial activity, not to mention a transportation hub—four subway lines and two of the city's busiest train stations, Tokyo Station and Yūrakuchō Station, lie just to the north and south of the site—presented design challenges of their own.

Rafael Viñoly Architects' ingenious solutions to these problems won a unanimous vote from the international jury, which selected the firm's proposal out of the nearly 400 anonymous entries submitted by architects from over 50 countries.

Adjusting the curve of the site's eastern boundary to transform it into a perfect arc, Viñoly created two concentric arcs hugging the railroad viaduct; within them, he slipped the slender, scythe-shaped building that houses the complex's meeting rooms. The "lenticular shape between the two intersecting arcs becomes the complex's vast lobby," notes the monograph Rafael Viñoly. "Another narrow slab building along the western boundary of the site, this time perfectly linear, contains the administrative offices." Four cube-shaped volumes, marching from the site's northern boundary to its southern edge, contain the facility's three largest performance spaces, "all raised above grade in order to free up the center of the site for a large public plaza" thronged by more than 100,000 people every day. Over the two-block-long, granite-paved plaza looms the spectacular seven-story Glass Hall.

"As you approach, the Forum divides itself into two structures joined by a public plaza," wrote the New York Times architectural critic Herbert Muschamp, Viñoly's unswerving champion (and most keenly insightful observer).

The Glass Hall rises on one side, tapering to a blade-sharp corner at both ends. On the other side, the Forum's four main meeting halls occupy a graduated row of gray concrete cubes. The plaza is actually more like a two-block-long pedestrian promenade. Beautifully landscaped and furnished with seating, the plaza is meant to be an oasis for office workers in the financial district nearby. The visual effect of this outdoor space is of a man-made ravine, a portage between rippling glass reflections and a cliff of faceted gray stone.

The Hall is a marvel of engineering whose 197-foot-high curtain wall of laminated glass would seem to tempt fate in an island nation whose collective memory is haunted by catastrophic earthquakes. Not so: though "extremely light and flexible", the Glass Hall's structural system is designed to withstand "extreme seismic forces" (Rafael Viñoly).

The roof of this giant atrium...is supported by an innovative truss system of arched beams in compression and cable elements in tension. The resulting monumental trellis both filters light into the space below and defines the building's presence on the Tokyo skyline. Audaciously, its 25,000-ton weight is transferred onto just two columns, which are located on the centerline of the Hall's longitudinal axis[,]...185 meters apart. These two columns, just over a meter in diameter at base and capital, replace the perimeter columns that would ordinarily have carried the weight of the walls and the roof, and thus make possible the exceptional transparency of the Glass Hall's exterior, glazed with 25,000 square meters of glass. The walls of the atrium support themselves with a very light steel compression system consisting primarily of the mullions needed to mount the individual nine-meter-square glass panes. To counteract the vertical deflection caused by wind loads on the walls' vast surface area, an additional system of pretensioned cables was attached to this frame. Horizontal deflection by the same forces is held in check, at the top of the volume by the shape of the roof, and below by mid-air pedestrian bridges, which span the atrium and function as beams.

The Hall is operatic in its visual drama. Muschamp was rhapsodic: "By day a glittering crystal, at night a glowing lantern, the Forum's Glass Hall joins the ranks of the world's great spaces. Like some lighter-than-air vessel, the hall's shipshape roofing slices through the Tokyo cityscape." Viñoly took up the theme in a 1998 lecture ("The Tokyo International Forum: The Making of Public Space"), observing that "the dramatic lighting of the truss has achieved what we never set out to do: the roof is becoming a horizontal landmark in the city. Landmarks are normally conceived as endless vertical structures up to the sky. In contrast, this hovers over Tokyo. It can be seen from many places and it is quite wonderful."

Fascinatingly, the inspiration for Viñoly's bold design came from the Pan Am logo. At wit's end because he "couldn't come up with any good idea" that would ensure his was the winning proposal, he "went to Paris to take a break on a Pan Am flight," he recalled, in an interview. "And when they started serving dinner, I saw this logotype on my napkin, which were these ellipses inscribed in a circle. What was incredibly difficult at that time is that I couldn't understand how to reconcile the curving of the rail tracks and a very rigid geometry of the octagonal streets adjacent to the site. So when I saw that logo everything just fell into place so perfectly. ... I landed in Paris and took the plane back to finish the project"—and secure the jury's unanimous approval.

Viñoly regards the Tokyo International Forum as a sea change for himself and his studio. "This commission ignited Rafael Viñoly Architects' growth in this period," the company website asserts. RVA "quickly became an international firm of 150 architects with projects throughout the United States and in Japan, South Korea, and Latin America."

- Bronx County Hall of Justice (1994–2006)

Located at East 161st Street, on a two-block site near the borough's Grand Concourse Boulevard, the Bronx County Hall of Justice is home to 47 courtrooms, seven grand jury rooms, and a large jury assembly room for the Supreme and Criminal Court; administrative offices for the Bronx District Attorney; and facilities for the New York Police Department, the Department of Corrections, and the Department of Probation.

In designing the large, complex facility, Viñoly had to reconcile the security demands of an urban threat environment transformed, after construction had begun, by the 1995 Oklahoma City bombing and 9/11; the energy-efficiency requirements of a greener architecture; and his desire to create a structure whose public courtyard, in the words of his firm's website, embraces "neighboring communities with an open and engaging civic plaza". "We really wanted to render a building that was open, unlike the building next door which was a fortress", Viñoly told The Architect's Newspaper (which identified the building in question as "the Brutalist former Criminal Court building"). "This building is exactly the opposite, with openness and access".

Even so, security trumped all, in the building's conception. "While natural light and views were desirable, heightened security requirements demanded protective design", notes the RVA website. According to an article on the Lehman College website, "Bullet-resistant glazing is used in the lobbies and judges' areas. In high security areas, glass is fitted with a ceramic frit to prevent direct viewing from the surrounding buildings. The public plaza, loading dock, and mail room structures are all blast resistant".

Nevertheless, the architect's website contends, "The Hall of Justice expresses the judicial system's openness and transparency" through its translucent curtain wall, whose fritted glass "allows daylight to permeate deep within the building" yet "screens the private circulation corridors. The accordion-fold design includes 'light shelves' that reflect daylight and reduce heat and glare. Diffused glazing renders interiors effectively opaque from the outside while providing exterior views from within". The design pays environmental dividends, too: Viñoly's highly effective exploitation of daylighting maximizes the Hall's energy efficiency.

"These buildings have traditionally been like fortresses", Fred Wilmers, project director for Rafael Viñoly Architects, told The New York Times. "We look to change that perception. The transparency is sort of figurative, but there is some in the literal sense as well". A later article, also in the Times, observed, "The modern South Bronx courthouse, meant to summon feelings of transparency and openness, could be seen as an attempt to refute Tom Wolfe's famous depiction of the Bronx courts as dens of urban dysfunction".

- Princeton University Stadium (Powers Field) (1995–1998)

Replacing Princeton's dilapidated Palmer Memorial Stadium, Viñoly's horseshoe-shaped "multi-sport and education facility" transformed the underside of the stadium seating—"a dark and unattractive area", notes the architect's website, "cluttered with stadium service elements"—into a covered public space. Brightened by natural light and beautified with extensive plantings, it "can be enjoyed independently from the sports events".

As always, Herbert Muschamp, the New York Times architecture critic, was applausive. "The park spills through the arches into the stadium itself," he wrote in his 21 June 1998 review. "Two raised plazas, set into the corners, are planted with trees. Walkways, bordered on one side with sloping planting beds, pass through the stadium, beneath the upper bleachers; these remain accessible even when the stadium is closed. Sunlight passes through slits between the rows of seats, casting bold stripes of brightness and shade, though the paths may prove more popular when it's raining."

But he wasn't all effusiveness. "The palette is on the raw side," he lamented. "The aggregate is not a pretty color. The bleachers are bare concrete, with strips of aluminum stretched along the seats. ... [Viñoly] has a weakness for dull walls." Then again, "it's a relief that Vinoly doesn't try to make these walls interesting. Their uncompromising intelligence is clear enough. Yet you may find yourself wishing that the visual matched the philosophical appeal."

- Van Andel Institute (Phases 1 and 2, 1997–2009)

Like the Princeton stadium, the Van Andel Institute for cancer research in Grand Rapids, Michigan uses natural light to create psychologically appealing interior spaces that prioritize the human use of buildings while also being energetically efficient. It features terraced levels cascading down the sloping site, the "fritted, arched glass skylights" of its "double-height interior atria" evoking "the rapids of the nearby Grand River."

Ahead of its time in its attention to architecture's carbon footprint and environmental impact, Viñoly's design is ingenious in its use of energy-saving technologies. "Sunlit labs mean less need for electric lighting, and 13,000 square feet of photovoltaic panels make up much of the difference," notes Giulia Guzzini in the design and architecture magazine Domus. "Waterless urinals and a ... 'green roof' reduce water consumption and runoff; the building itself was constructed in large part from materials ... manufactured locally [or] from recycled materials. Even the site—in a dense urban area, on a former brownfield site, with little disruption to the surrounding natural habitat—adds to [Rafael Viñoly Architects'] green credentials."

- Kimmel Center for the Performing Arts (1997–2001)

Occupying a full block in Center City Philadelphia, the Kimmel Center is a commanding presence on the Avenue of the Arts (Broad Street). Its "block-long barrel vault of glass and steel" (RVA website) embraces the 2,500-seat Verizon Hall, home to the Philadelphia Orchestra; the Perelman Theater, a more intimate, reconfigurable recital hall; and Commonwealth Plaza, an immense public space.

The Kimmel Cultural Campus, as the buildings and public space are collectively known, was initially conceived as a new home for the city's orchestra. The orchestra's home at the time, the Academy of Music (1857), was a jewel box of a building, cherished by symphony audiences for its ornate 19th-century interior. Its dismal acoustics, on the other hand, were the bane of musicians and audiences alike.

The Viñoly team's reconception of the concert hall, with assistance from the acoustician Russell Johnson of Artec Consultants, was nothing short of radical:

RVA decided not to treat Verizon Hall as just another architectural element, designed according to the principles of a given architectural style, but instead to conceive of it as a musical instrument, designed in accordance with the principles of ideal sound production. ... To that end, the interior is shaped like a cello, entirely clad in mahogany with no orthogonal surfaces, and with the orchestra, the source of the sound, located within the plan in a position analogous to that of a cello's bridge, which connects the strings to the sounding body of the instrument. The natural acoustic properties of this shape and spatial arrangement are supplemented by a series of passive and active devices deployed throughout the hall. The majority of the interior walls are actually operable doors that allow the sound to flow into enormous reverberation chambers that occupy the interstitial space between the exterior enclosure and the interior of the concert hall. Depending on the doors' configuration, reverberation times inside the hall can be lengthened by increasing the overall volume as much as 30 percent. This programmable system is augmented by retractable sound absorbing curtains within the reverberation chambers and a configurable acoustic canopy that directs sound energy out to the audience while allowing the musicians to hear themselves clearly.

The design of the 650-seat Perelman Theater, whose turntable stage enables the theater to shapeshift from the traditional proscenium-arch configuration into a smaller, arena-style space with a concert shell and wraparound seating, is equally innovative.

But the real stunner is the complex's glass barrel vault. "Its structure of folded steel ribs sheathed in plate glass renders an incredibly transparent enclosure with a free span of approximately 50 meters," according to the monograph Rafael Viñoly (Princeton Architectural Press, 2002). "The end walls of the barrel vault achieve such a high level of transparency and structural lightness that they seem to disappear as sunlight pours into the plaza. A gravity-tensioned cable suspension system supports over 1,000 square meters of optically clear museum glass at each end of the barrel vault. Specifically designed as a curtain, as opposed to a mesh with cables crossing in two directions, the walls' structure is nearly invisible but can still withstand gale force wind pressures by deflecting—like a membrane—approximately one meter in or out at the center of its surface. Slightly tinted Low E glass [mitigates] the structure's heat gain and [acts] as a UV shield to preserve the color and quality of the natural macore wood that sheaths the Verizon Hall.

The project struck a responsive chord in Viñoly, whose father was a screenwriter and filmmaker whose creative vision was deeply rooted in his passion for theater and music. "The first orchestra I ever knew was The Philadelphia Orchestra, under Leopold Stokowski, which I heard on my father's records," the architect told an interviewer. "He was involved professionally with music in Uruguay and then in Argentina, where he ran the Teatro Colón, and I myself originally trained for a career as a pianist. So it appealed to me to build a place for The Philadelphia Orchestra, for which I retain an adulation that dates back to childhood."

- David L. Lawrence Convention Center (1999–2003)

Overlooking the Allegheny River in downtown Pittsburgh, Pennsylvania, the 1.4 million-square-foot David L. Lawrence Convention Center marries Viñoly's commitment to green architecture—RVA's use of natural ventilation, gray water reclamation, native landscaping (eliminating the need for irrigation), low-temperature air distribution, and daylighting (which illuminates 75% of the building) earned the Center Platinum LEED (Leadership in Energy and Environmental Design) certification—to a cresting, wavelike suspension-cable roof that pays homage to Pittsburgh's historical sense of itself both as a "City of Bridges" and a Promethean "Steel City," powered by industrial innovation and manufacturing might.

The design "draws structural inspiration from the bridges that span Pittsburgh's Allegheny River to create a suspended roof with a rising contour that encourages passive ventilation and shelters a vast, column-free space," the RVA site informs. "This unique steel cable structure made possible a naturally-lit, column-free 250,000-square-foot exhibition hall." In 2004, the Institution of Structural Engineers awarded Viñoly's David L. Lawrence Convention Center its Supreme Award for Structural Engineering Excellence.

An evolveEA study detailed in the Journal of Green Building concluded that the success of the David L. Lawrence Convention Center "proved that sustainability principles could be integrated into a breathtaking and high-performing design". Using nearly a decade's worth of performance data, the study yielded persuasive evidence that "green building projects can accelerate broader organizational sustainability efforts" and "create major benefits for a region, including additional commerce and an increased uptake of green building design".

- Princeton University, Carl Icahn Laboratory, Lewis-Sigler Institute for Integrative Genomics (LSI) (1999–2004)

Driven, according to its website, by "the need to deal with the explosion of information based on the genomic sequences of the human and all major experimental organisms" and founded on the assumption that "the most interesting and difficult problems in the quantitative disciplines...frequently lie in biological phenomena," The Lewis-Sigler Institute of Integrative Genomics's research and teaching programs draw on an academic brain trust whose expertise spans physics, chemistry, computer science, chemical engineering, and molecular biology.

Rafael Viñoly Architects' design for the LSI facilitates collaboration across disciplines or, as the monograph Rafael Viñoly (Princeton Architectural Press, 2002) puts it, "multiplying opportunities for intellectual cross-pollination": the "loft-like" laboratories are equipped with modular partitions and demountable casework (cabinetry, bookshelves, and the like), the firm's website notes, "for maximum flexibility over time as research needs change to keep up with the pace of genomic science". The atrium "at the heart of the building" is "a social place where researchers and students can meet in formal and informal conference areas, sparking the impromptu discussions that lead to collaboration and new research paths". At the same time, the design remains true to Viñoly's environmentally conscious (and cost-efficient, because energy efficient) ethos and, not least, his signature use of natural light and his sense of structure as sculpture: the atrium "looks onto a large, ellipse-shaped campus green through a curved, two-story glass curtain wall that introduces natural light deep into the center of the building. In order to minimize thermal loading on the mechanical systems, a series of 31 12-meter-tall, computer-controlled aluminum louvers track the movement of the sun to provide optimal shading to the south-facing curtain wall at all times, creating a dynamic interplay of light and shadow in the atrium throughout the day."

- University of Chicago Booth School of Business, Charles M. Harper Center (2000–2004)

In visual conversation with its neighbors—Frank Lloyd Wright's iconic Robie House, an exemplar of his Prairie Style, and the university's Rockefeller Chapel, a Gothic masterpiece—Viñoly's Booth School of Business is anchored by a central winter garden, a glass atrium that soars six stories up, culminating in a roof supported by curved steel beams (a nod to the chapel's Gothic arches) and crowned by four "four-pointed vaults built of tubular steel with proportions that follow those of the Rockefeller Chapel's lancet windows." Divided into two orders, the building's perimeter features a lower element "clad in horizontal panels of the same Indiana limestone that is widely used on other campus structures" and whose earth-hugging horizontal composition echoes that of the Robie House.

"Two extremes of American attitude towards architecture are neighboring the Booth School of Business, the Robie house and the collegiate Gothic chapel and the tower," says Viñoly, in a video interview created for the university. "The greatest difficulty is to try to reconcile these two from an architectural point of view."

Taking the structural principle of the Gothic architecture and bringing it back into this reinterpretation seemed to me to be quite legitimate. What you see in the central space is this reference to the Gothic arch. I essentially took it as the best way of supporting a large span of glass, which was the whole intent of the central space. We thought that it was important to create a sense of an internal quad, so one is the summer garden and the other one is the winter garden. ... [T]hese two elements ... are the kinds of things that give a sense of collective purpose.

- Brooklyn Children's Museum (2001–2008)

Established in 1899, the Brooklyn Children's Museum was the first such museum in the United States and, very possibly, the world. The 46-million-dollar major expansion by Rafael Viñoly Associates, completed in 2008 and notable for its then-cutting edge use of energy-saving features, made it the first "green" museum in New York City. Designwise, it's noteworthy, too: its schoolbus-yellow ceramic-tile exterior makes it pop in what the RVA website calls "the primarily low-rise neighborhood of Crown Heights." As well, the design incorporates child-centric features such as porthole windows at various heights and low-level handrails. "With his design, Mr. Viñoly said, he set out to combine a sense of fun with the seriousness of childhood curiosity," wrote Times reporter Robin Pogrebin. "'I was constantly struggling with the question of transforming it into a toy and it not being a toy,' he said." The building won the 21st annual award from the Art Commission of the City of New York and the 2008 Project of the Year Award from the Society of American Registered Architects/New York Council.

- Cleveland Museum of Art (2001–2012)

One of America's wealthiest, most-visited art museums, with an endowment of $755 million and around 770,000 visitors each year, the Cleveland Museum of Art is noted for its world-class collections of Asian and Egyptian art—and, in architectural circles, for the successive expansions necessitated by its never-ending acquisitions. Founded in 1913, the museum was first housed in a neoclassical Beaux-Arts building made of white Georgian Marble whose floorspace was doubled by a 1958 expansion, after which Marcel Breuer's modernist North Wing further expanded the museum's footprint in 1971, followed in 1983 by the addition of a West Wing.

From 2001 to 2012, Rafael Viñoly Associates radically redesigned the museum, demolishing the 1958 and 1983 additions and replacing them with a vast atrium, its football field-sized piazza flooded with natural light thanks to the atrium's vaulted glass roof. As well, RVA reimagined the East and West Wings while taking care to harmonize them with the austere, sharp-edged modernism of the Breuer building. Viñoly's $350 million redesign doubled the museum's size.

Noting that the museum's architects, Hubbell and Benes, envisioned the original building "as a Greek revival pavilion, situated at the head of a pastoral park and lagoon landscape designed by the Olmsted Brothers," but that subsequent additions muddled that vision, resulting in "a disjointed, confusing warren of spaces", the RVA website describes Viñoly's design as resolving the 1916 Greek Revival building, Breuer's addition, and other "disparate architectural vocabularies into a singular composition". "The new gallery wings' exterior stone cladding alternates bands of granite with bands of marble that modulate the two very different aesthetics of the 1916 and Breuer buildings," the SVA site adds, preserving "distinctions between 'modern' and 'historic'" while integrating them into a visually coherent whole.

"The expansion and renovation was a civic and philanthropic effort on an epic scale that transformed the museum from a musty, dusty warren to one of the best structures of its kind in America," wrote the architecture critic Steven Litt, in his obituary for Viñoly at Cleveland.com.

The project added nearly 200,000 square feet of space, expanding the museum 51% in size, from 389,000 to 588,000 square feet. More to the point, the work vastly improved the museum's ability to display its stellar collection of 65,000 objects. Beyond that, the project is a highly successful addition to Cleveland's public realm. The soaring, light-filled atrium at the heart of the expansion and renovation is the best and most inviting large civic interior in the city. ... [T]he museum, as revised by Viñoly, combines spatial clarity with an abundance of natural light, a generosity of public spirit, and a connection to its urban surroundings...

- Howard Hughes Medical Institute Janelia Farm Research Campus (2002–2006)

Located in Ashburn, Virginia, the 281-acre Janelia Research Campus is part of the Howard Hughes Medical Institute. Its community of scientific researchers and technologists ("integrated teams of lab scientists and tool-builders", in the words of the facility's website) focuses primarily on problems in mechanistic cognitive neuroscience, 4D cellular physiology, molecular tools and imaging, and computation and theory.

Viñoly designed the 900-foot, three-story laboratory whose serpentine form dominates the campus. Known, tellingly, as The Landscape Building, it evinces signature Viñoly concerns such as environmental impact and site sensitivity: in tune with the Virginia and Maryland fields and woodlands surrounding the site, which slopes down to the Potomac River, the glass-and-steel structure is terraced into the hillside; the lab's gently undulating form hugs its curves. Even the garage does its part, as an article in R&D magazine notes: it's covered by a 180,000-square-foot roof garden whose indigenous plantings help "the entire building function as an integral part of the landscape".

"At Janelia," Viñoly reflected, "the landscape is the building: it creates a counterpoint between technology and nature that enriches the research performed there. It is a highly technical structure in terms of equipment and flexibility, and yet the entire composition looks like a natural thing."

In keeping with Viñoly's longstanding commitment to a human-centered architecture, and to flexible spaces that facilitate collaboration and intellectual crosspollination, the Landscape Building "incorporates flexible laboratory space that can change depending on the equipment, purpose, and needs" and "inviting social spaces that encourage people to meet and share ideas" (Janelia.org, "About Us").

- Curve Theatre, Leicester, England (2002–2008)

Designed by Viñoly in collaboration with the scenographers Ducks Scéno and Charcoalblue and the acousticians Kahle Acoustics, the Curve Theatre is a commanding presence in Leicester's cultural quarter. As with many Viñoly projects, the Curve turns outward to engage with the city's civic life while beckoning the public inside, demystifiying—and democratizing—the theater, an experience some regard as forbiddingly "highbrow", through its louvered curtain wall. The four-story facade exposes to public view the theater's two main performance venues ("a 750-seat main theater, and a 350-seat black box theater"), notes the architect's website. "The stage, lobby, and sidewalk are all at the same level, with ample visual connections among them, thus making the theatrical performance an extension of activity on the street." Daringly, the Curve bares the back-of-the-house machinery of theatrical illusion, too: "Situated at ground level across the main lobby from the stage, double-height workshops and production spaces feature glass walls that expose production activities and make them a visible part of the overall performance experience." In essence, said Viñoly, RVA's design turned the usual theater configuration "inside out".

The Curve marked Viñoly's UK debut, and not everyone gave it a standing ovation. The critic Simon Richards thought the building bristled with hostility toward the "Victorian eclecticism" and "Art Deco stylings" of the surrounding neighborhood, presenting "only a paranoid layering of sharpened blades that curve around to protect it from all angles". The Daily Mail critic Quentin Letts joined the chorus, grousing, "Public parts of the building are charmless. And it feels like an airport." Time has softened public and even critical opinion, however—so much so that the BBC reported, in 2015, "Once condemned as an 'expensive disaster,' the Curve Theatre in Leicester now stands in the top 10 venues of its kind in the country."

- Carrasco International Airport, Montevideo, Uruguay (2004-2008)

Viñoly's soaring, swooping addition to the Carrasco International Airport (officially, the Aeropuerto Internacional de Carrasco General Cesáreo L. Berisso) recalls Eero Saarinen's iconic gull-winged TWA Flight Center. For his part, the architect sees the arc of the terminal's 1200-foot roof both as a tribute to flight—a symbolic wing poised to soar—and a visual echo of Uruguay's natural landscape. "The gentle curve and low profile of the airport's monolithic roof is inspired by the rolling dunes along Uruguay's coastline," notes the RVA website. Yet, in keeping with Viñoly's career-long attention to cultural context, the "prominence placed on public zones" in and around the building reflects his awareness, as an Uruguayan, of "the regional tradition of seeing off family and friends before a flight". For example, the floor above the departure level features a landscaped terrace that affords panoramic views of the runway and main public concourse. "In Uruguay, friends and family still come to greet you at the airport or see you off," Viñoly told an interviewer, "so this terminal provides great spaces for the people who aren't traveling as well as those who are. The atrium, the main hall, the terrace, and the passenger concourse make this a dramatic and welcoming place for everyone."

- 20 Fenchurch Street, London (2004-2014)

Officially named for its address but derided by critics as "the Walkie-Talkie" because of its topheavy shape—a chunky oblong that bulges outward as it rises, like a Lego block left too long in scorching sunlight—20 Fenchurch Street is inarguably the most controversial of Viñoly's projects, no mean feat for the architect Curbed described as "prolific and polarizing".

Hulking over the historic City of London financial district, the 38-story commercial skyscraper was a red flag to preservationists even before the contractor broke ground. Heritage groups worried that its height would dwarf the surrounding neighborhood and that its uncompromising modernism would clash jarringly with historical icons such as St Paul's Cathedral and the Tower of London. A reduction in height was demanded and the architect obliged but that, it turned out, was only the beginning of 20 Fenchurch's career as a much-reviled eyesore, a lightning rod for Londoners' backlash against supertall buildings and, more generally, overdevelopment.

Touted by the developer as London's highest public park, the "sky garden" that spans the building's top three floors was a deciding factor in the planners' approval of a mammoth office tower on the edge of a conservation area, far from London's main cluster of skyscrapers. RVA's architectural renderings depicted it as an oasis of full-grown trees and bucolic, landscaped gardens. In reality, it consists almost entirely of ferns and succulents and is accessible to the public only after visitors run a security gauntlet and then only part of the day. "If you book three days in advance, or reserve a table at one of the overpriced dining concepts," wrote the architecture critic Oliver Wainwright, "you can go through airport-style security and be treated to a meagre pair of rockeries, in a space designed with all the finesse of a departure lounge".

As Wainwright noted, "the underwhelming roof terrace" was, it turned out, "the least of the Walkie Talkie's problems. Before it was even open, it was found that its south-facing concave glass facade channelled the sun's rays into a deadly beam of heat, capable of melting the bumper of a Jaguar, blistering painted shopfronts and singeing carpets—with temperatures hot enough to fry an egg on the pavement." The wags had a field day, razzing Viñoly for its War of the Worlds-like "death ray" and dubbing the building "the fryscraper". In addition, the unanticipated downdraft caused by the hugely tall, weirdly shaped building created a wind-tunnel effect that on several occasions came perilously close to blowing pedestrians into the heavily trafficked street.

It was for these dubious distinctions that 20 Fenchurch was awarded Building Design's Carbuncle Cup, a tongue-in-cheek prize bestowed annually on "the ugliest building in the United Kingdom completed in the last 12 months." Wainwright, as always, was ready with his poison pen: "Responsible for a catalogue of catastrophes, it is hard to imagine a building causing more damage if it tried. It stands at 20 Fenchurch Street...on a site never intended for a tall building. It looms thuggishly over its low-rise neighbours like a broad-shouldered banker in a cheap pinstriped suit. And it gets fatter as it rises, to make bigger floors at the more lucrative upper levels, forming a literal diagram of greed." Seen from the east, the building's silhouette was "reminiscent of a sanitary towel flapping behind Tower Bridge," he quipped.

Viñoly claimed that his design had featured horizontal louvers on its south-facing facade to mitigate the death-ray effect but they were removed, to cut costs, during the development process. Then, too, climate change has intensified the effects of reflected sunlight beyond anything he'd imagined, said the architect, noting that he'd "judged the temperature was going to be about 36 degrees, but it's turned out to be more like 72 degrees. ... It is phenomenal, this thing." He conceded that RVA "made a lot of mistakes with this building, and we will take care of it" while bemoaning, somewhat contradictorily, "the nature of the development process in the UK, in which the architect is often sidelined."

- University of Oxford, Radcliffe Observatory Quarter and Andrew Wiles Mathematical Institute (2005-2013)

The Mathematical Institute, University of Oxford, which opened in 2013, was the inaugural building in the university's Radcliffe Observatory Quarter; RVA created the master plan for the Quarter and designed the institute.

The Institute brings together, under one roof, a department that had been scattered around the campus, strengthening its identity. As with many such RVA projects, its design facilitates interdisciplinary collaboration for the more than 500 researchers and 900 undergraduates. "In the building, faculty offices are acoustically isolated to allow for individual work habits," notes the architect's website. "The atrium, however–the social heart of the building–is light-filled and spacious with a glazed clerestory. Punctuated by informal gathering spaces, the atrium stretches nearly the entire length of the building to encourage collaboration by enabling visual connections and impromptu meetings between faculty on all floors."

The Mathematical Institute, as well as the other phases of the master plan, balance Viñoly's characteristic sensitivity to the architectural character of the surrounding neighborhood—in this case, historic Oxford—with innovative strategies to maximize energy efficiency and environmental impact. For example, the mezzanine level is flooded with natural light by means of two "crystalline light well structures" (RVA website) in the atrium. As well, the project "relies upon natural ventilation to all faculty offices, enhanced by nighttime purging and exposed concrete soffits. The building envelope incorporates motorized solar shading to minimize solar gain, green roofs, and a rainwater/grey water recycling system"—ecologically responsible design elements that earned it the Royal Institute of British Architects (RIBA) 2014 South Region Award.

As for Viñoly's attention to architectural context and historical setting, Jan Morris, writing in the Financial Times, applauded the "magnificent new Mathematics Institute, meticulously rational in proportion and glass panelling," for "the way in which it osmotically incorporates the nearby presence of that grand old observatory tower across the [Radcliffe Observatory Quarter]." Taken as a whole, the building "is big without pomp, consequential without extravagance", she thought. "Everything about it, indeed, expresses calculation – mathematical symbols pave the entrance, and one interior canopy displays the geometrical theorem known to some of us as Pascal's Mystic Hexagram."

The mathematical symbols mentioned by Morris were designed by Oxford's own Sir Roger Penrose, Emeritus Rouse Ball Professor of Mathematics. "The paving," according to Oxford Mathematics' YouTube channel, "is constructed from just two different diamond-shaped granite tiles, each adorned identically with stainless steel circular arcs. There are various ways of covering the infinite plane with them, matching the arcs. Every such pattern is non-repetitive and contains infinitely many exact copies of what you see before you."

- The Bryanston, Marble Arch Place, Hyde Park, London (2011-2020)

The tallest residential building overlooking Hyde Park, the 18-story Bryanston at Marble Arch looms over London's West End. Viñoly's first resident project in the U.K., The Bryanston consists of two buildings, a residential tower with 54 luxury apartments—one-bedroom flats start at £1.35m—and a 119,500 square-foot commercial office building. An article in the Evening Standard noted that the tower sits on "the site of the infamous Tyburn Gallows," where from the 16th through the 18th centuries public executions drew roisterous crowds.

Panoramic windows hugging the curvature of the apartment building's tower afford 360° views of the city and its storied park. "In my opinion, the British are the best landscape designers in the world," said the architect, "so Hyde Park was completely dominant in the design of The Bryanston." On a more personal note, he'd had "a special affection" for Hyde Park since his first visit to the U.K. in 1964, he told an interviewer. "We drew up maybe 25 designs for this development," he recalled. "We settled on it being an urban connector between the park and street behind. The park was what really inspired me. It has a human scale without losing its self-possessedness. [It's] a living space that can be used freely by people, animals and birds."

- Penn Medicine Complex (2007-2015)

Master-planned and designed by Rafael Viñoly Architects, the University of Pennsylvania's 1.9 million square-foot Penn Medicine Complex in Philadelphia comprises the Perelman Center for Advanced Medicine, an ambulatory care and cancer center and the main teaching hospital for the University of Pennsylvania; the 14-story Smilow Center for Translational Research; the Jordan Medical Education Center and an expansion that increases clinical space (both finished in 2015); and, most recently, the South Tower, completed in 2016, which is situated on the Center for Advanced Medicine and Jordan Medical Education Center.

"The Jordan Medical Education Center began with the idea that medical education and medical practice should be intrinsically linked, both philosophically and physically," the architect's site informs. "To achieve this, the design called for relocating the existing University of Pennsylvania School of Medicine facilities to join them with the Smilow Center for Translation Research, resulting in the nation's first medical education space to be fully integrated into an active clinical and research facility."

- Stanford University Hospital (2007-2019)

Conceived in collaboration with Perkins Eastman, RVA's design for the New Stanford Hospital was all about modules: "Rather than creating the typical base-and-tower hospital building, the firm proposed a modular plan that can be easily adapted for a variety of uses, thus allowing both for incremental expansion of the hospital building and a horizontal development strategy that complements the low-rise campus context of Stanford University and its Medical Center", the Viñoly website notes. "A universal module measuring roughly 120 by 120 feet is deployed in a checkerboard pattern to generate a floor plan in which hospital functions alternate with open spaces."

"Our experience with large hospitals is that you can become lost in a maze," Viñoly partner Chan-Li Lin Lin told Metropolis writer Lydia Lee. "Breaking down this one into smaller elements made it easier to navigate and understand," notes Lee.

Yet, unorthodox as it is, Viñoly's seven-story, 824,000-square-foot, $2-billion update—specifically, its open-air courtyards and five rooftop gardens laced together with interconnecting paths—rhymes with the original 1959 hospital designed by Edward Durell Stone.

The architects "took inspiration from the main Stanford University campus, whose Richardsonian Romanesque core is a large courtyard designed by Frederick Law Olmsted," writes Lee. "In an oft-cited 1984 study, patients with a view of trees recovered faster than those looking at brick walls. Stanford's patient rooms feature 8-by-14-foot windows."

The project team's use of laser scans to ensure precise leveling on the hospital's three-acre surgical floor and installation of "more than 200 base-isolation pendulums...below the structure's steel columns [to] enable the building to withstand an 8.0-magnitude earthquake" earned The New Stanford Hospital a 2020 Best Projects Award from Engineering News-Record (ENR) in the Health Care category (Northern California region).

The building's "base isolators" are designed "to act as veritable roller skates", reports the Silicon Valley Business journal. "That means [the building], which is...connected to the existing hospital via a second-story pedestrian bridge, is built to withstand an 8.0-magnitude earthquake because of its ability to move as far as six feet in the event of a major temblor."

Over a decade in the works (from planning through construction), the New Stanford Hospital has 368 private rooms, 20 state-of-the-art operating suites, and an emergency department that is over twice the size of the previous one. Its Level 1 trauma center is the only one between San Francisco and San Jose.

- Battersea Power Station Masterplan (2007-2020)

Closed in 1983 after more producing a fifth of London's electricity for more than a half century, the Battersea Power Station—familiar to many as the hulking icon of smokestack capitalism on the cover of the Pink Floyd album Animals—sat dormant, slipping into decrepitude until October 14, 2022, when it reopened as "a mixed-use sustainable development offering commercial and retail functions as well as residential, cultural, and event spaces interspersed with community facilities" (Rafael Viñoly Architects website) on the South Bank of the Thames, in the Nine Elms neighborhood. RVA created the master plan.

"Redevelopment efforts stalled repeatedly, despite the success of the Tate Modern—which opened upriver in another converted power station in 2000—and the unveiling of an extensive master plan for the site by Rafael Viñoly in 2008," noted Architectural Record. "By 2011, several newspaper editorials had called for the building's demolition." One of the unexpected challenges that confronted Viñoly, he noted at the World Architecture Festival London in 2015, was the inaccessibility of the site. "I always thought that [Battersea] was going to be a piece of cake," he admitted, "and then I realized that it was a gigantic cul-de-sac, with very little access." The solution was "a series of envelopes to open it up". Against all odds, the project came to fruition and, as AR notes, "there remain strong traces of Viñoly's uncompromising plan in the circular perimeter road and massing of the adjacent residential buildings."

Viñoly's "primary design goal" for the site, as described on the RVA site, was to use "the historic structure of the Power Station ... as the focal point of the site's regeneration," which would culminate in the creation of a "self-sufficient and vibrant new community serving as the anchor of the Vauxhall/Nine Elms/Battersea Opportunity Area." It would comprise more than 3,400 homes as well as offices, shops, restaurants, bars, hotels, and community and leisure facilities, and would incorporate 18 acres of open space. Viñoly envisioned "three primary streets that link the Power Station to the site's southern perimeter and through to a future extension of the waterfront park and river walk" and a complex whose architectural vocabulary is "defined by a series of varied typologies that reflect the different character areas of the public realm. In the tradition of London terrace housing, the approach sequence to the Power Station is defined by curving building façades that are further activated by a varied alignment of floors to create deep, open terraces for the residential units." As always with RVA projects, sustainability was front and center: the project would reboot the power station, this time with renewable resources, and "the restored Power Station building will become Europe's largest zero-carbon building."

In the end, though, "Viñoly appeared worn down by the London quarrels over the project and eventually stepped aside — frustrated over the affection for the old smoke belcher," noted an obit in The Washington Post. SimpsonHaugh and dRMM architected Phase 1, WilkinsonEyre handled Phase 2, and the winning bid for Phase 3 went to Foster + Partners and Gehry Partners.

A 2011 profile in The Atlantic noted the difficulties he'd faced "trying to map a route through the hazy and treacherous borderlands that lie between architectural history and public nostalgia". Wayne Curtis wrote, "Although he acknowledged the heroic monumentality of Battersea, he's slightly mystified by the public affection for the plant—people seem to forget that it is, after all, 'a culprit in the history of pollution of the Thames,' and something that has helped destroy the climate. 'It's like preserving Dracula, somehow,' he said."

- Novartis Pharmaceuticals Corporation, Building 337 (2009-2013)

"To achieve maximum layout flexibility for a workforce that is constantly in flux, this unique building consists of two continuous workspaces that spiral up and around a central atrium in a double helix arrangement," notes the architect's website, of Rafael Viñoly Architects' design for an office building on the 230-acre Novartis campus in East Hanover, New Jersey. "All offices and work spaces are located on one of two interlocking spirals that are connected by gently sloped ramps, making the transition between levels imperceptible. Stairs and walkways cross the atrium, connecting the two work environments, and allow occupants alternative circulation pathways between the interlocking spirals."

According to Engineering News-Record, Building 337 was part of a "$548-million campus transformation that brought together marquee architects with 400 contractors and 5,000 tradespeople—which created three distinctive office buildings, new roadways, a 1,700-space parking garage and a LEED-Gold visitor reception building." Viñoly's bold design, "which takes up the equivalent of five stories with staggered levels arranged in a double helix instead of traditional floor slabs spanning the whole building footprint", posed significant challenges, noted ENR. "How do you set up call buttons for the elevators when you don't have floors?" Randy Dias, head of Novartis' global design and construction management team, told the magazine. "It took us over a year with a graphic designer to figure it out." And, as ENR noted, "lacking conventional floors and columns also was an engineering puzzle... 'There are two spirals that create a number of levels, like a parking garage almost,'" said an interviewee.

The solution was using multiple 55-sq-ft bays that step upward around a central atrium, which itself has a sloping perimeter walkway and features conference rooms that "hang" from the glass and steel roof's beams. "You have a 4-ft-deep plate girder along the column lines, which picks up on one side the higher framing and on the other side lower framing," [Umakant Vadnere, vice president at structural engineers Thornton Tomasetti] says.

As always, RVA kept a close watch on the building's environmental impact, a priority evident in the design's incorporation of sustainable technologies and energy-saving measures. The building employs what the RVA site calls "a chilled-beam mechanical system, dual-energy recovery wheel, a double-insulated glass façade and skylight, structural fins as exterior shades, and perforated photovoltaic cells which cover the roof and filter light into the building." The work environment, with its 800 workstations, is "entirely daylit, with a technologically-advanced, energy-efficient triple-glazed curtain wall façade and a skylight that envelope the building."

In 2016, Architectural Record commemorated its 125th anniversary by honoring 125 of the most important works of architecture built since the magazine's founding in 1891. RVA's Novartis Building 337 was among them.

- Edward M. Kennedy Institute for the United States Senate (2010-2015)

Located next to the I.M. Pei-designed John F. Kennedy Presidential Library and Museum on the University of Massachusetts Boston campus, the Edward M. Kennedy Institute for the United States Senate commemorates the public service of Senator Kennedy, who died in 2009 at age 77 after serving in the U.S. Senate for nearly 50 years. At the same time, it serves as a non-profit center for civic literacy and political engagement, dedicated, according to its mission statement, to "educating the public about the important role of the Senate in our government, encouraging participatory democracy, invigorating civil discourse, and inspiring the next generation of citizens and leaders to engage in the civic life of their communities." The Institute features a full-scale reproduction of the United States Senate Chamber as well as a replica of Kennedy's Washington, D.C., office.

Rafael Viñoly Architects designed the institute's $78-million, 68,000 square-foot building to embody Senator Kennedy's "historic commitment to the legislative process", notes the RVA website, which is "communicated and nurtured by a multimodal civic institution in a temple-like structure ... locked in filial dialog with the adjacent architecture" of the JFK Library and Museum. The institute's sleek, minimalist design emphasizes that "familial connection": "consisting of a white square base topped with a smaller dark grey volume that houses a representation of the Senate Chamber, the building responds to the simple, intersecting geometric forms of the JFK Library, which incorporates circular elements and a central cube intersected by a triangular volume. ... The Institute's ground level is clad in white concrete with punched window openings that echo the windows of the JFK Library. The black glass of Pei's library atrium is echoed in the dark grey composite cladding of the central orthogonal volume of the Institute, which extends up vertically, housing the Senate Chamber representation."

The Architect's Newspaper applauded Viñoly's "resoundingly smart, sensitive design", observing that "Viñoly's symmetrical, low-rise plan leaves the spotlight on Pei's geometries, but responds to them with aligned triangular 'wings' and a subtler vertical mass—gray metal composite to Pei's black glass. The axial entrance path alludes to neoclassical Washington, D.C., creating what partner David Rolland called 'a procession, a formal entry into the building.'" The paper was effusive about the building's interior, too, noting,

The corridors are masterfully done. Painted in deep, warm grays and floored in polished concrete, they are softly lit to avoid the gloom of a cinema. ... Hallways this simple could easily be soulless; these are thoughtful and comfortable. You then experience the Senate replica—with its yellow gallery walls, navy and red textiles, Levanto marble, cherry desks, and oval tray ceiling—as a sunburst.

Mark Favermann, writing for Berkshire Fine Arts, was less laudatory, judging the Institute "not very visually celebratory" and lamenting that "this is minimalism just being too minimum. ... The exterior lacks any softening surrounding landscape (there are no trees or punctuating plantings)... The somewhat barren exterior composition suggests a hard institutional bunker, a simplistic geometric rectangle. The site comes off as more of an unadorned mausoleum than a celebratory memorial for a major statesman." The building's interior fell flat, too, he thought: "Unfortunately, the corridor space feels more like an Ikea showroom than an elegant legislative palace."

The Society of American Registered Architects (SARA) begged to disagree: it lauded RVA's design for the institute with one of its 2016 Design Awards of Honor.

- New York University Abu Dhabi (2008-2014)

Rafael Viñoly Architects conceived and executed the master plan for NYU Abu Dhabi, a "split-level, pedestrian-oriented" (RVA website) complex, on Saadiyat Island, of 29 buildings constituting a liberal arts and sciences college, graduate programs, and advanced research, as well as facilities devoted to residential and student life and the arts.

According to the architect's website, RVA's vision for the 40-acre site was informed by "regional typologies such as the Islamic garden and the madrassa, on the experimental complexity of Islamic geometries, and on the Western university quadrangle." As always with RVA, environmental impact and energy efficiency were guiding precepts: the campus's "narrow streets and building massings ... are scaled to adopt the optimal ratio of shading and composed according to prevailing winds to promote natural ventilation. The streetscape design integrates landscape–with colonnades, native plantings, trellises, and traditional water channels–and urban morphology to create a comfortable outdoor space year-round." Likewise, the RVA site contends, the firm's integration of "regional and Western planning typologies" foster a cultural "microclimate" that "enables a flowering of intellectual liberalism in the heart of the Middle East."

Human-rights and labor activists demurred, calling out NYU—and, by implication, RVA—for turning a blind eye on the human-rights and labor abuses of the United Arab Emirates, which have been well documented by groups like Human Rights Watch. (See, for example, Human rights in the United Arab Emirates and Migrant workers in the United Arab Emirates.) "A clutch of lustrous architects — Frank Gehry, Jean Nouvel, Zaha Hadid, Rafael Viñoly, and Norman Foster — have been lured with princely sums to design" buildings on Saadiyat, wrote Andrew Ross, a professor of Social And Cultural Analysis at NYU, in a New York Times op-ed ("High Culture and Hard Labor," March 28, 2014). "But there is a darker story behind the shiny facades of these temples to culture, arts and ideas." Ross interviewed some of the "tragically underpaid and ill-treated migrant workers" who helped build NYU Abu Dhabi, many of whom were reduced to de facto servitude by the crippling debt they owed the recruitment companies that brought them to the UAE.

Times reporting, in a story that ran shortly after Ross's op-ed ("Workers at N.Y.U.'s Abu Dhabi Site Faced Harsh Conditions"), confirmed his allegations. The article's authors described workers laboring "11 or 12 hours a day, six or seven days a week, just to earn close to what they had originally been promised" and living in squalid conditions, "15 men to a room." Stripped of their passports and subject to brutal crackdowns if they protested their working and living conditions, many of them were unable to make enough money to buy their freedom—and a return flight home.

In its 2009 report, "The Island of Happiness: Exploitation of Migrant Workers on Saadiyat Island, Abu Dhabi," Human Rights Watch noted that it had communicated its concerns, on early on, to "each of the architectural firms – Ateliers Jean Nouvel, Gehry Partners LLC, Zaha Hadid Architects, Tadao Ando Architects, Foster and Partners, and Rafael Vinoly Architects PC – selected to design high-profile buildings on Saadiyat Island." According to HRW, only Gehry partners and Ateliers Jean Nouvel responded.

- 432 Park Avenue (2010-2016)

Supertall (at 1,396 feet), with a 1:15 slenderness ratio, 432 Park Avenue is both a pharaonic feat of engineering and a symbol, to some, of "everything ... New Yorkers revile about supertall skyscrapers" (Bloomberg). A mixed-use tower comprising residential, retail, and commercial spaces, 432 Park is one of Rafael Viñoly's signature buildings, a swaggeringly bold architectural statement and, undeniably, a lightning rod for popular outrage at the super-rich.

The RVA site details the engineering challenges posed by the building's ratio of dizzying height to stiletto skinniness, which made wind vortexes a potentially catastrophic problem:

A regular grid of exposed concrete members creates an open basket within which seven "independent buildings" stack up, separated by spaces within which the building cores are exposed to the outdoor elements. These breaks allow for deflection of wind pressures and help the 1,396-foot-tall building, with its 1:15 slenderness ratio, achieve structural stability.

One of the tallest residential buildings in the world, 432 Park sits on Billionaires' Row, where the median unit sells for tens of millions. "432 Park has been criticized as a temple to 'the 1 percent' that blocks sunlight and casts a shadow on Central Park," The New York Post noted, adding that even the building's developer admitted that "penis envy" was a factor in the fad for supertall skyscrapers. "But Viñoly called it a testament to the city's 'verticality.'"

Architect magazine critic Aaron Betsky applauded the "clarity" of Viñoly's sleek, soaring design, dubbing 432 "a refreshing alternative to the mediocrity of the buildings around it". To be sure, he conceded, "the tower's very appearance represents the transformation of this and every other city into a place for the wealthy to live and play (the top apartment will cost more than $95 million), but on the other hand it does so with an elegance, borne out of its simplicity as much as its height, that make it clear that it is still possible to make an beautiful skyscraper."

- Puente Laguna Garzon (2012-2015)

Functional yet poetic in its elegantly pared-down design, Viñoly's Laguna Garzón Bridge is no less practical for its minimalist beauty: the tight turning radius of the ring of road that sits, like a belt buckle, in the middle of it slows motorists and, into the bargain, encourages them (and pedestrians and cyclists) to take in the sweeping panorama of what the RVA site calls "one of the most beautiful and pristine coastal landscapes in Uruguay," the environmentally sensitive Garzón Lagoon. "Rafael Viñoly Architects accepted the commission for the Laguna Garzón Bridge on the condition that the new bridge would signal the end of the National Route 10, the main access road to several seaside resorts in the area," notes the RVA site. "Viñoly lobbied Uruguayan government agencies to give the highway's development power to local jurisdictions whose interests are more environmentally-centered."

CNN dubbed the Laguna Garzón Bridge one of the “12 Spectacular New Bridges That Break The Mold," observing that it has the effect, when viewed from an aerial perspective, of creating "a lagoon within a lagoon".

- Stavros Niarchos Foundation-David Rockefeller River Campus, The Rockefeller University (2012-2019)

The Rockefeller University, a private biomedical research and graduate studies-only university in New York City, commissioned Rafael Viñoly Architects to design the $500 million Stavros Niarchos Foundation-David Rockefeller River Campus. The project architect was Jay Bargmann. Constructed above the six-lane FDR Drive and flanking the existing campus, the SNF-DR River Campus features new laboratories housed in the Marie-Josée and Henry R. Kravis Research Building, a two-story structure that spans four NYC blocks. The campus also includes a conference center, administrative building, and dining commons. It extends the university's historically significant gardens, designed by the noted landscape architect Dan Kiley, to the East River.

"The decision to maintain a low building profile enhances and preserves the integrity of the original landscape by extending it out over the rooftop of the new laboratory building," the architect's website informs. "This additional space builds on Kiley's tree-lined allées and outdoor 'rooms' defined by plantings with interactive public garden areas that have varying degrees of privacy and access."

"In creating a low-rise, horizontally oriented laboratory building disguised by landscape, RVA has added new space for cutting-edge research and for scientific collaboration, both indoors and out," wrote Joann Gonchar, in Architectural Record. "And it has ingeniously—and somewhat counterintuitively—managed to integrate its addition into the existing campus while completely, and nearly invisibly, transforming it."

In 2021, The International Architecture Awards, organized by The Chicago Athenaeum: Museum of Architecture and Design and The European Centre for Architecture Art Design and Urban Studies, awarded the 2021 International Architecture Award in the Schools and Universities category to RVA's Rockefeller University River Campus. The award honors building and urban planning projects that push the envelope of architecture. In 2023, the Campus was accorded another honor: the American Institute of Architects' (AIA) 2023 Architecture Award.

- Academy Stadium and City Football Academy, Manchester, England (2016-2018)

Situated by the Etihad Campus, the Academy Stadium and City Football Academy (CFA) is a £200-million, 80-acre training complex for "elite professional athletes, the world's most promising young prospects, and the local youth who study at the schools included in the complex of buildings and fields," notes the RVA website. "The 7,000-seat stadium is designed to mirror the layout of Etihad Stadium and provides covered seating on four sides to ensure a 'match-day'-type experience for youth players. ... The Youth Training Facility is located across from the Elite Training facility to create a sense of connection to the professional team."

Premier Construction News applauded RVA and the city for their "ambitious local recruitment and supply chain targets, both of which were achieved, significantly up-skilling the local community and making a positive economic impact on the surrounding area". According to PCN, "25% of the 70% local workforce was drawn from the East Manchester area, with 10% of people on site previously unemployed." Moreover, the magazine noted, the project "had a positive environmental impact", too: the remediation of the 80-acre site turned "a vast tract of land, polluted by years of heavy industrial use, into clean terrain. 2000 trees were planted on and around the site."

- National Medal of Honor Museum (2020-2024)

Designed by Rafael Viñoly Architects, the National Medal of Honor Museum in Arlington, Texas is scheduled to open in 2024. The museum is dedicated to honoring Medal recipients. "Set into a five-acre tranquil landscape" on the banks of Mark Holtz Lake, a man-made pond near the 1994 Ballpark baseball stadium replaced by Globe Life Field, "the Museum complex's primary building volume seemingly hovers above ground by 40 feet, supported by five concrete megacolumns, each representing a branch of the United States Armed Forces," notes the architect's website. "The design concept evokes both the 'burden' of those who have received the Medal of Honor and the inspirational character traits that are exemplified by its recipients."

The Exhibition Hall will feature displays intended to inspire "acts of everyday heroism among its visitors" in the spirit of the bravery memorialized by the museum (what the museum website calls "conspicuous gallantry and intrepidity at the risk of life, above and beyond the call of duty"). "Exhibits feature micro and macro artifacts interspersed within immersive, interpretive, and interactive story-telling presentations of content."
