= List of buildings and structures in the Comoros =

Buildings and structures in the Comoros include:

- St. Theresa of the Child Jesus Church, Moroni
- Stade de Beaumer
- Stade de Moroni
- Stade Said Mohamed Cheikh

== See also ==
- List of airports in the Comoros
- List of lighthouses in the Comoros
- List of museums in the Comoros
