= List of works by Renzo Piano =

This list of works by Renzo Piano categorizes the work of the Pritzker Prize-winning architect. The following are some of his major constructions:

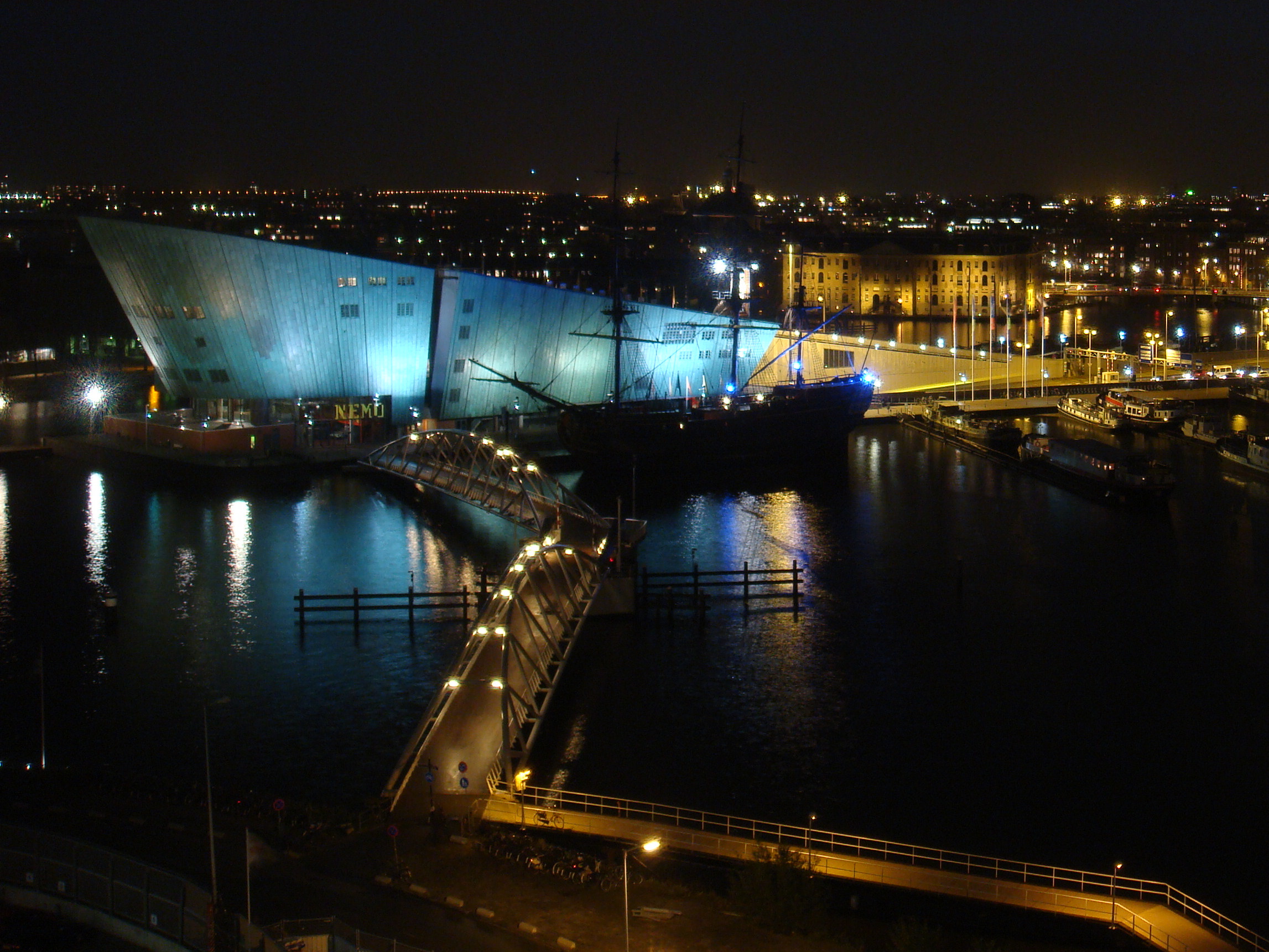
Nemo Science Centre in Amsterdam. The shape reflects the tunnel entrance it is built on (1997)

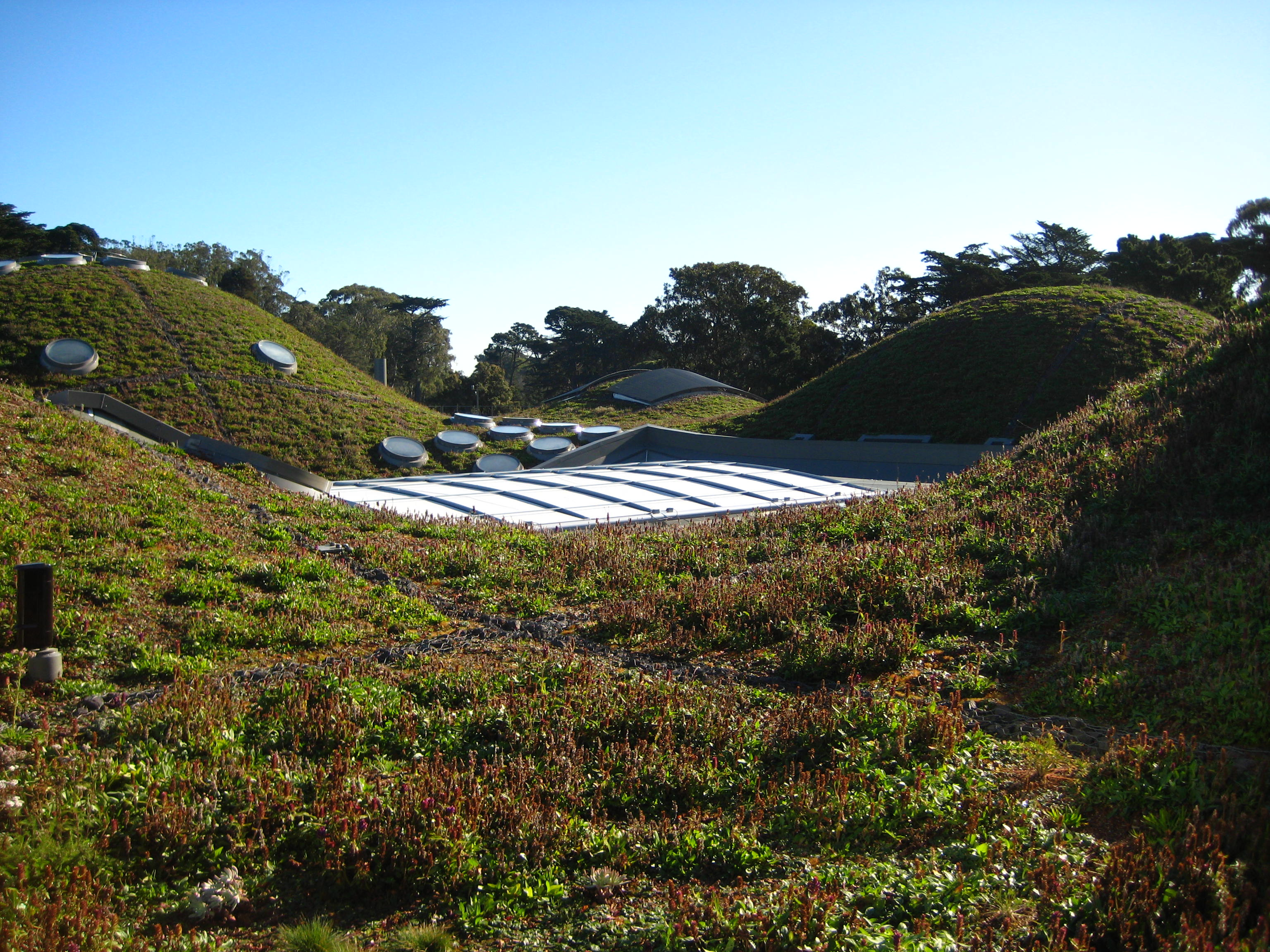
The Living Roof of the California Academy of Sciences, a museum and research facility in San Francisco, United States (2008)

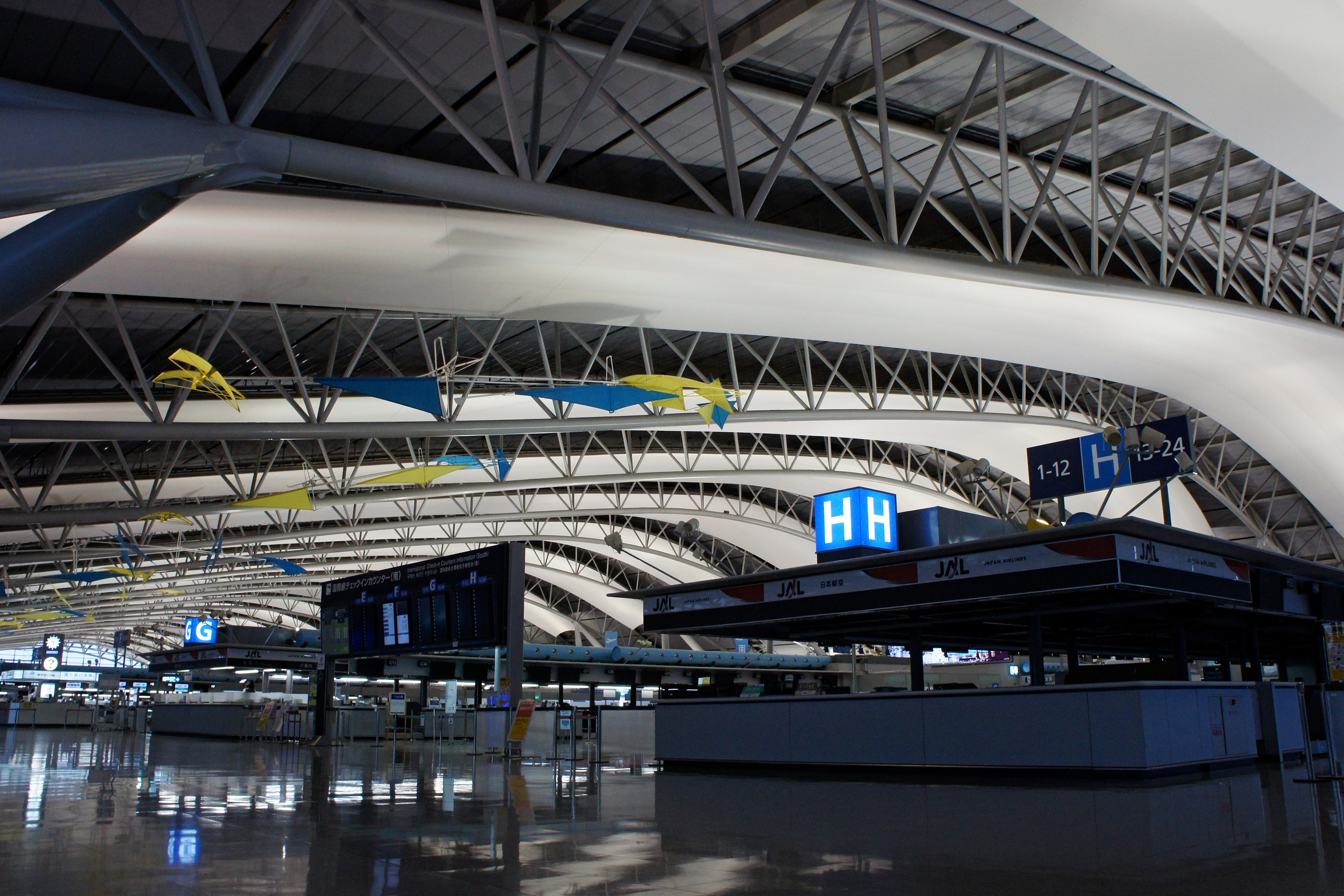
Kansai International Airport, Osaka, Japan (1991–1994)

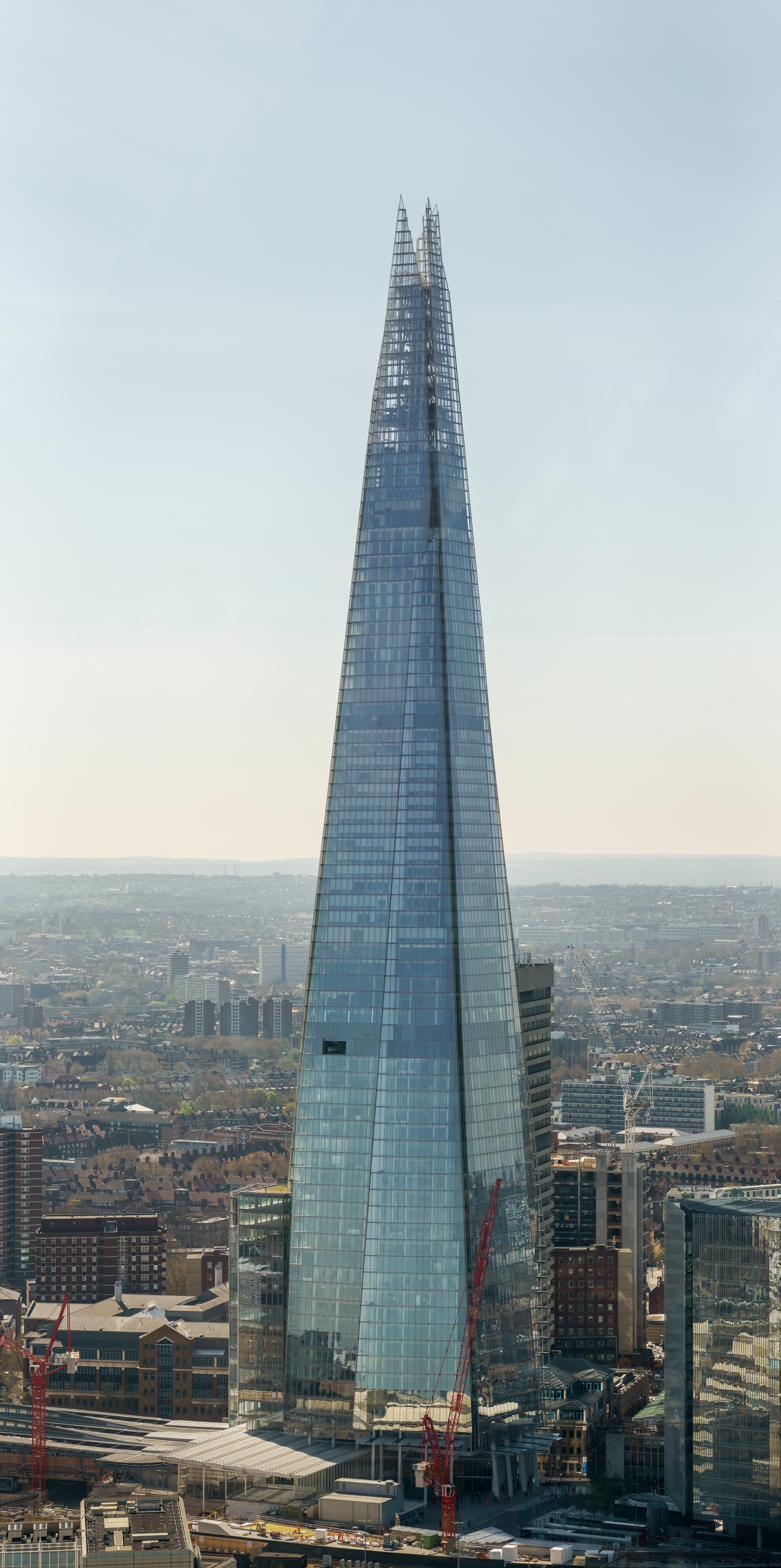
Shard London Bridge, London, UK (2012)

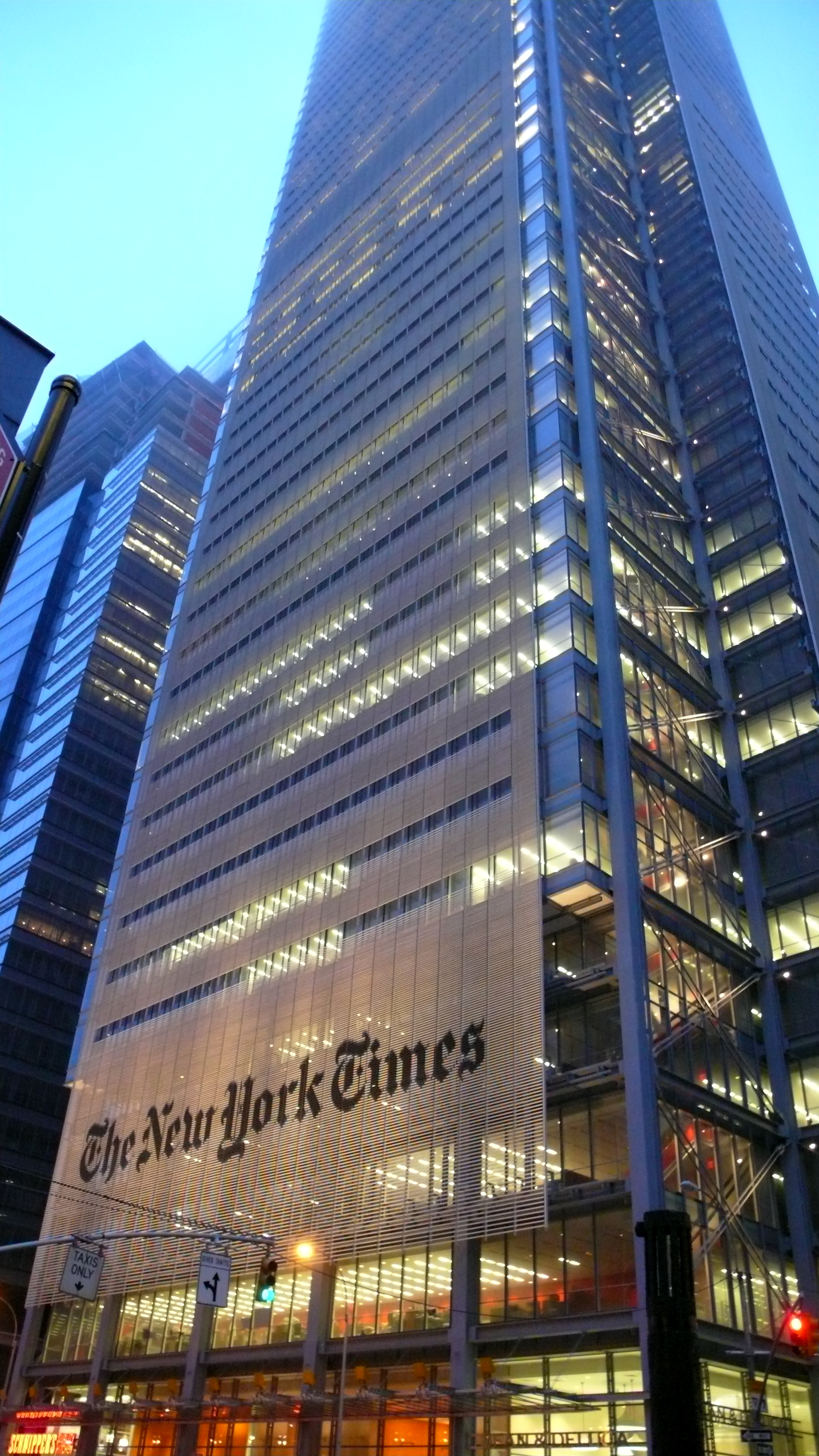
The New York Times Building, New York City (2007)

== Completed ==
- IRCAM & the Centre Georges Pompidou, Paris, France (1971–77)
- IBM Travelling Pavilion, (1982–84)
- Menil Collection, Houston, Texas, United States (1982–87)
- Banca CIS building, Cagliari, Sardinia, Italy (1985)
- Lingotto conversion, Turin, Italy (1985–1994)
- Stadio San Nicola, Bari, Italy (1988–89)
- Centro Meridiana, Lecco, Italy (1988–1999)
- International Terminal, Kansai International Airport, Osaka, Japan (1991–94)
- Beyeler Foundation Museum, Basel, Switzerland (1991–97)
- Ushibukahaiyao Bridge, Shimoshima Island, Amakusa, Japan (1991–97)
- Jean-Marie Tjibaou Cultural Center, Nouméa, New Caledonia, France (1991–98)
- Porto Antico, Aquarium of Genoa, Genoa, Italy (1992)
- Potsdamer Platz master plan, Berlin, Germany (1992–2000)
- Atrium Tower, Berlin, Germany (1993–97)
- Cy Twombly Gallery, Houston, Texas, United States (1995)
- Cité Internationale, Lyon, France (1995–06)
- Aurora Place, Sydney, Australia (1996–2000)
- Ferrari wind tunnel, Maranello, Italy (1996–98)
- NEMO science museum, Amsterdam, Netherlands (1997)
- Il Sole 24 Ore headquarters, Milan, Italy (1998–2004)
- Zentrum Paul Klee, Bern, Switzerland (1999–2005)
- Nasher Sculpture Center, Dallas, Texas, United States (1999–2003)
- The Shard, London, United Kingdom (2000–12)
- Auditorium Paganini, Parma, Italy (2001)
- Maison Hermès, Tokyo, Japan (2001)
- Parco della Musica, Rome, Italy (2002)
- Rocca di Frassinello Winery, Gavorrano, Italy (2002–07) (artistic direction: Massimo Alvisi)
- Astrup Fearnley Museum of Modern Art, Tjuvholmen, Oslo, Norway (2002–12)
- The Morgan Library & Museum expansion, New York City, United States (2003–06)
- The New York Times Building, New York City, United States (2003–07)
- Los Angeles County Museum of Art, Los Angeles, United States (2003–2010)
- Padre Pio Pilgrimage Church, San Giovanni Rotondo, Italy (2004)
- Weltstadthaus, Cologne, Germany (2005)
- High Museum of Art Expansion, Atlanta, United States (2005)
- Whitney Museum of American Art, New York City, United States (2005–15)
- Isabella Stewart Gardner Museum wing, Boston, United States (2005–12)
- Pathé Foundation headquarters, Paris, France (2006–14)
- Vulcano Buono, Nola, Italy (2007)
- Museo delle Scienze, Trento, Italy (2007–13)
- California Academy of Sciences rebuilding, San Francisco, United States (2008)
- Kimbell Art Museum expansion, Fort Worth, Texas, United States (2008–13)
- Stavros Niarchos Foundation Cultural Center, Athens, Greece (2008–16)
- Modern Wing expansion of the Art Institute of Chicago, Chicago, United States (2009)
- Nichols Bridgeway, Chicago, United States (2009)
- Harvard Art Museums expansion and renovation, Cambridge, Massachusetts, United States (2009–14)
- City Gate, Royal Opera House, Parliament House and Ditch, Valletta, Malta (2009–15)
- Central Saint Giles, London, United Kingdom (2010)
- Grattacielo Intesa Sanpaolo, Turin, Italy (2011–14)
- KT Corporation headquarters, Seoul, South Korea (2011–15)
- Centro de Arte Botín, Santander, Spain (2011–17)
- Tribunal de Paris, Paris, France (2012–18)
- The Academy Museum of Motion Pictures, Los Angeles, United States (2012–2021)
- City Center Bishop Ranch, San Ramon, California, United States (2014–18)
- Columbia University Manhattanville Campus Master Plan and Jerome L. Greene Science Center, New York City, United States (2016)
- One Sydney Harbour, Sydney, Australia (2017–2024)
- Genoa-Saint George Bridge, Genoa, Italy (2018–20)
- Science Gateway, CERN, Geneva, Switzerland (2018–23)
- Fubon Xinyi A25 in Taipei, Taiwan (2024)

== Current ==
- Sesto San Giovanni masterplan, Milan, Italy (2004–)
- Renzo Piano Tower I & II, San Francisco, United States (2006–)
- ARS AEVI Museum of Contemporary Art in Sarajevo, Bosnia and Herzegovina (1999–)
- Krause Gateway Center / Kum & Go Corporate Headquarters, Des Moines, Iowa
- Waterfront di Levante, Genoa, Italy (2021–ongoing)
- Port Tunnel of Genoa, Genoa, Italy (2024–ongoing)
- Isola Della Musica, Hanoi, Vietnam (2025–ongoing)

== Cancelled ==
- City Tech Tower, New York City, United States
- Trans National Place, Boston, United States
