= Sahel Academy =

International school in Niamey, Niger

- Niamey; Niger

Information
- Founded: 1987
- Founder: SIM
- Website: www.sahelacademy.com

Sahel Academy was a Christian international school in Niamey, Niger. It was established by SIM in 1987, and had its last graduation in May, 2026 - closing due to security concerns.

It educated the children of missionaries and the English-speaking people of Niamey. During the 2013–2014 school year, Sahel Academy had 200 students in grades K-12, representing 14 countries, and a staff of 40 from four nations. The school offers an English-speaking international curriculum, consisting of IGCSE (from Cambridge) for grades 9–10. Sahel Academy has been accredited by the ACSI and MSS-CESS.

== Location ==
Sahel Academy occupied an 1.2-acre (5,000 m^{2}) site in the Koira Kano area of Niamey.
