= Chichiri =

Chichiri may refer to:

- Chichiri, a neighbourhood in Blantyre, Malawi
- Well (Chinese constellation) (Japanese: Chichiri-boshi)
- Chichiri, a character in the 1990s Japanese manga series Fushigi Yûgi

== See also ==
- Chichiri Museum, a museum in Malawi
- Kamuzu Stadium, Malawi, formerly known as Chichiri Stadium
