= Chichiri Museum =

Museum in Blantyre, Malawi

Coordinates: 15°48′12″S 35°02′18″E

- Location: Blantyre, Malawi

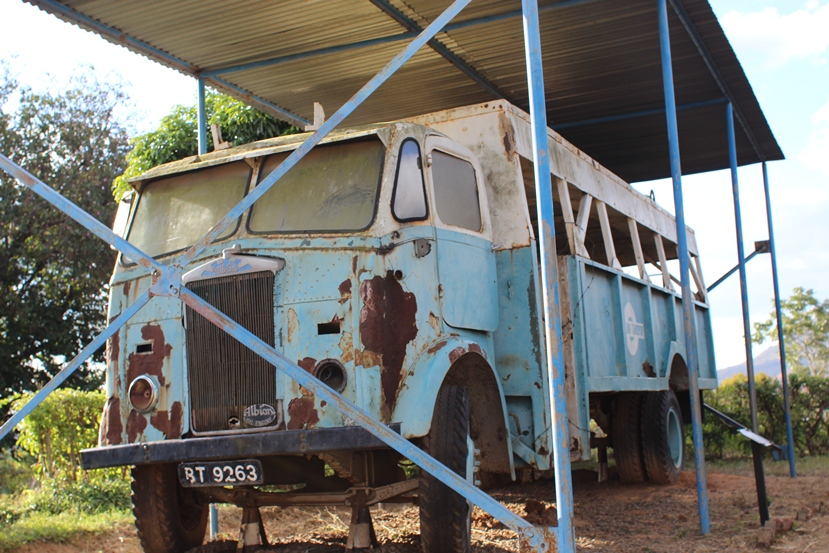
Old Europeans only bus at Chichiri Museum.

The Chichiri Museum (Tumbuka: Nyumba yakusungilamo vyakale yaku Chichiri), also known as the Museum of Malawi, is a historical and cultural museum located in Blantyre, Malawi. Strictly Museum of Malawi refers to a group of five museums but Chichiri Museum (which is one of them) uses the name due to the breadth of its exhibits.

== History ==
The Society of Malawi started to campaign for a museum in the early 1950s. The Museums of Malawi, initially known as the Nyasaland Museum, was established through legislation in May 1957 via Museum Ordinance No. 201. The initial museum was housed at Mandala house in Blantyre.

The current museum building was constructed in 1965 at Chichiri Hill in Blantyre, using funds from the Beit Trust and the Government of Malawi. The cost of construction was 21,000 Malawian pounds. The museum was formally opened by Kamuzu Banda on 29 June 1966. Under the presidency of Kamuzu Banda collecting was in some cases limited to avoid any risk of upsetting the government with the result that little collecting was done from groups associated with rebels. Attempts to compensate for this have been made in post Banda collecting practices.

In 2009 the Electricity Supply Corporation of Malawi supplied a hydroelectic exhibit that sits in the outdoor section of the museum.

== Collection ==
The museum has a transport collection displayed outdoors that includes a steam engine, a fire engine and a Europeans only bus. Also outdoors is a Ndiwula hut in the syle of a Chewa rural homestead. It was built in 1966 under the instructions of President Kamuzu Banda.

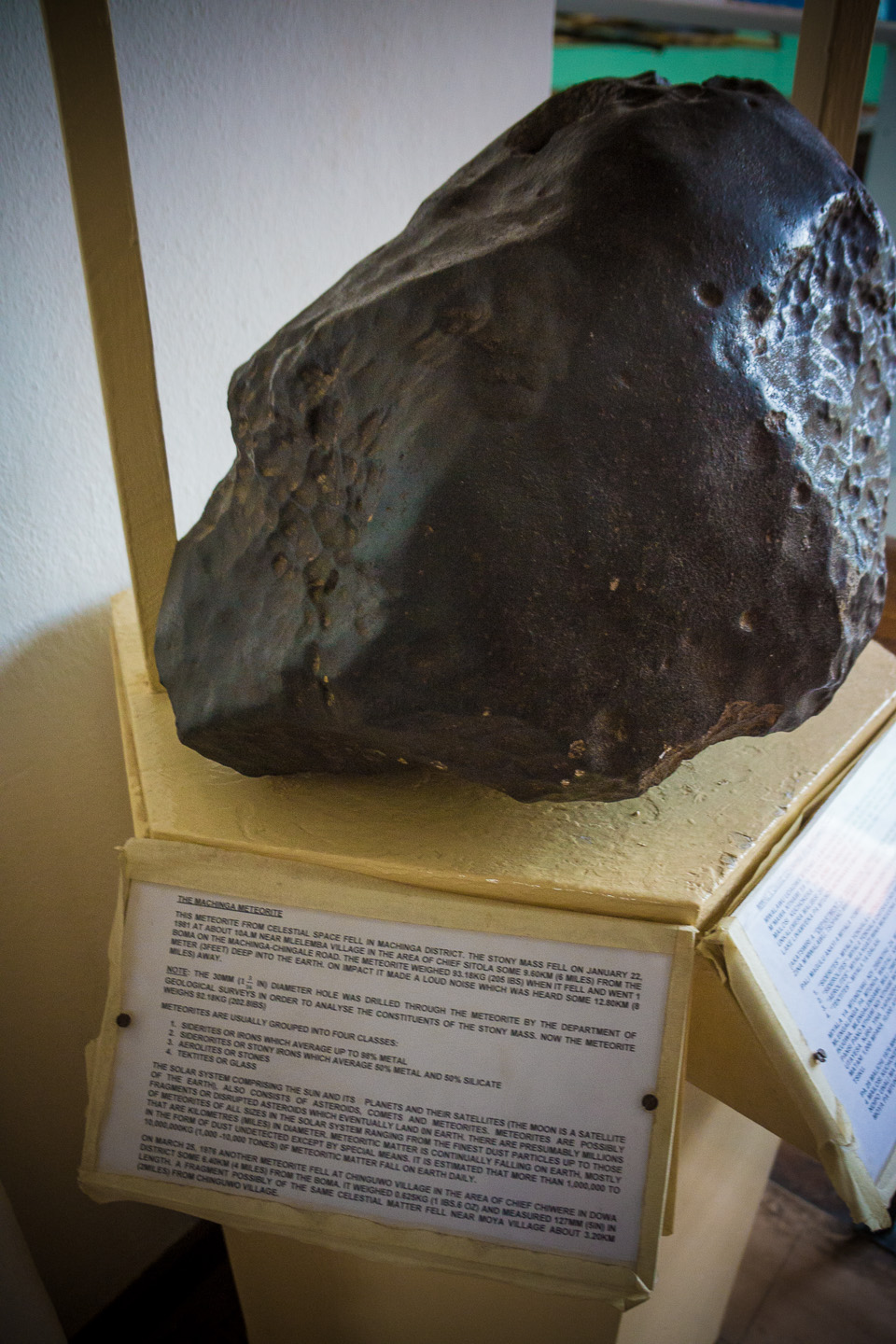
The Machinga meteorite

The museum also displays the Machinga Meteorite which at the time of its fall was mistaken for a mozambique missile. The meteorite weighs 93.2Kg and in 1984 was classified as a shocked L6c chondrite. In 1990 a reanalysis classified it as a L6d.

== Gallery ==
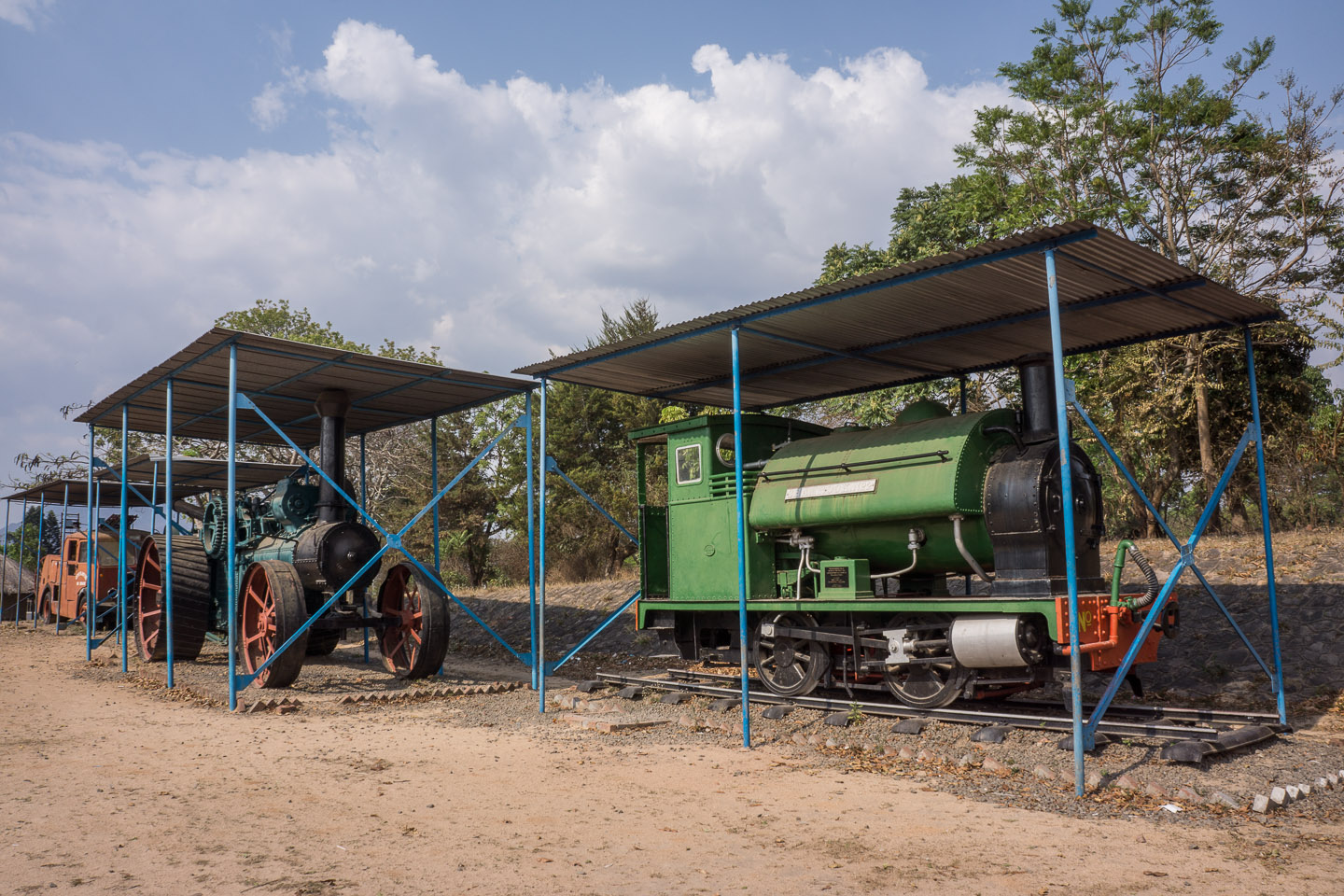
Early trains of Malawi

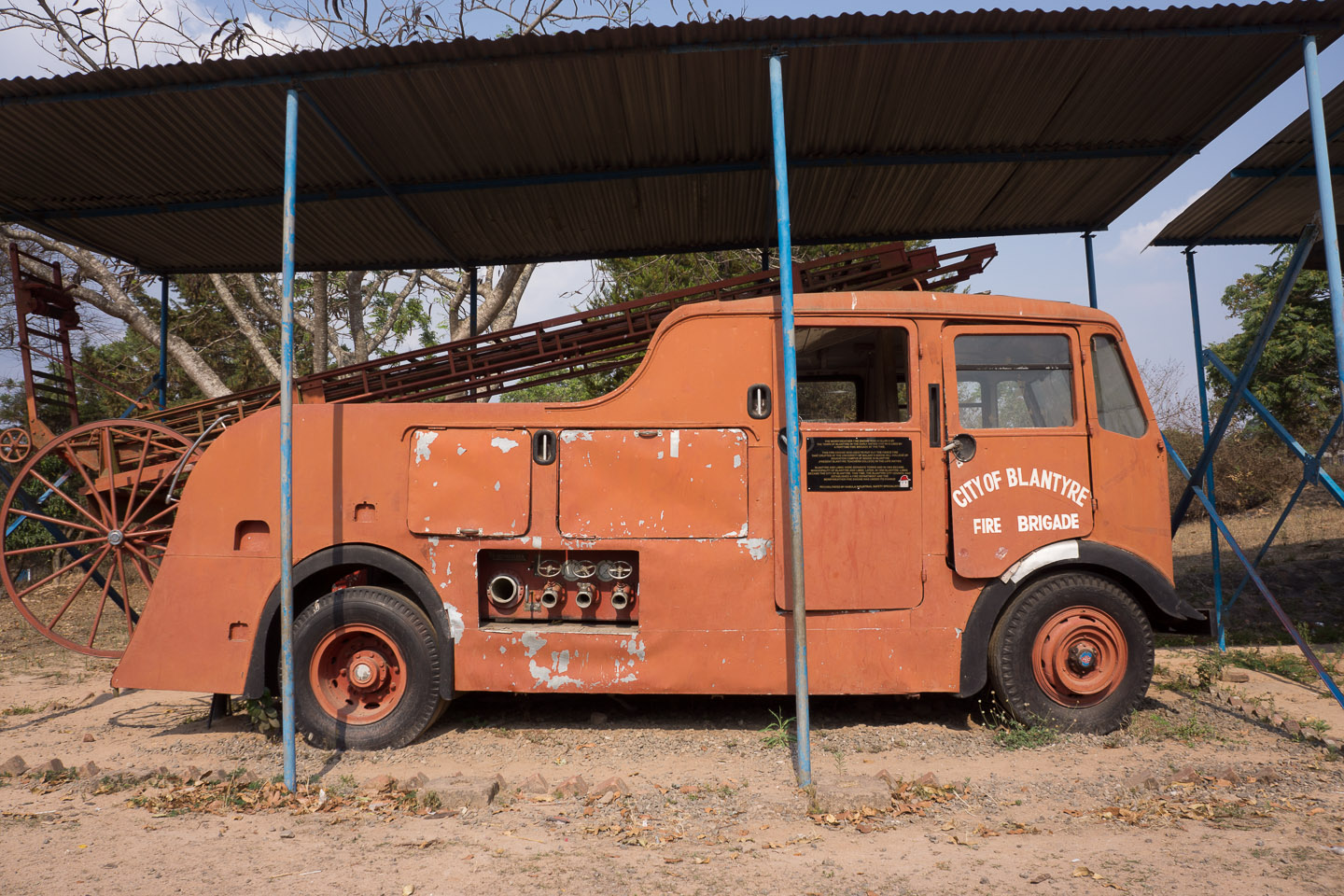
Old fire brigade truck

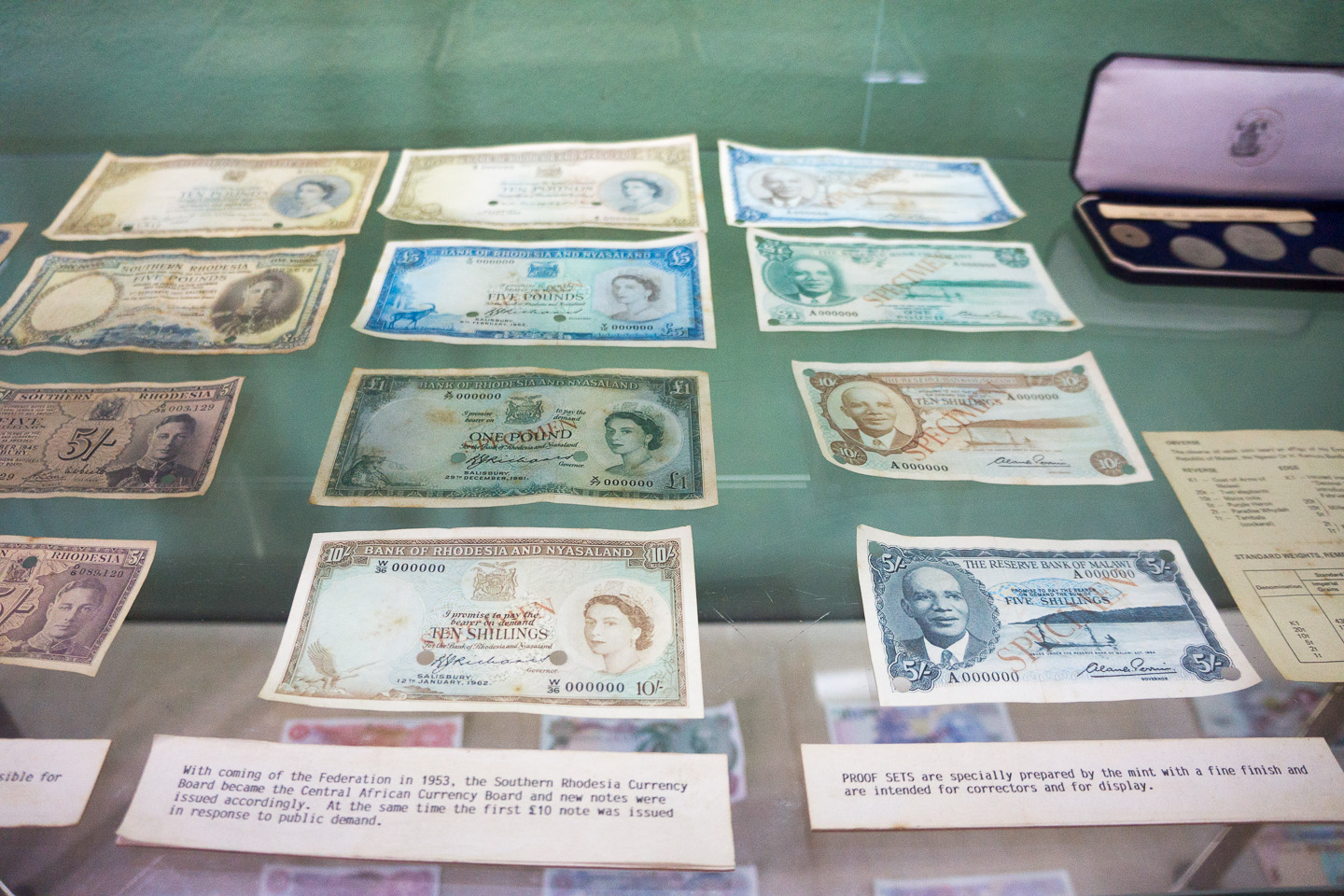
Early currency used in Malawi

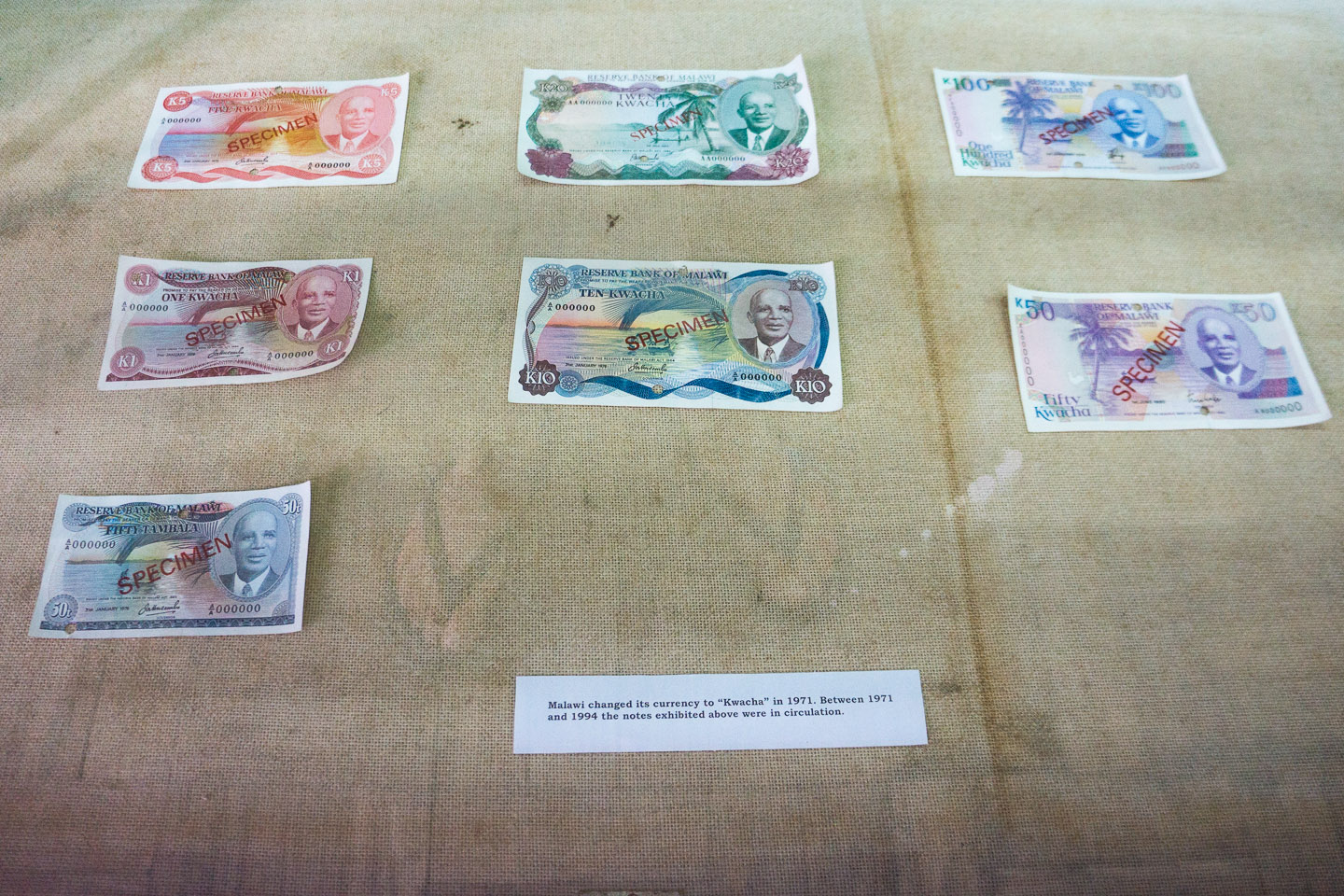
Malawi kwacha notes

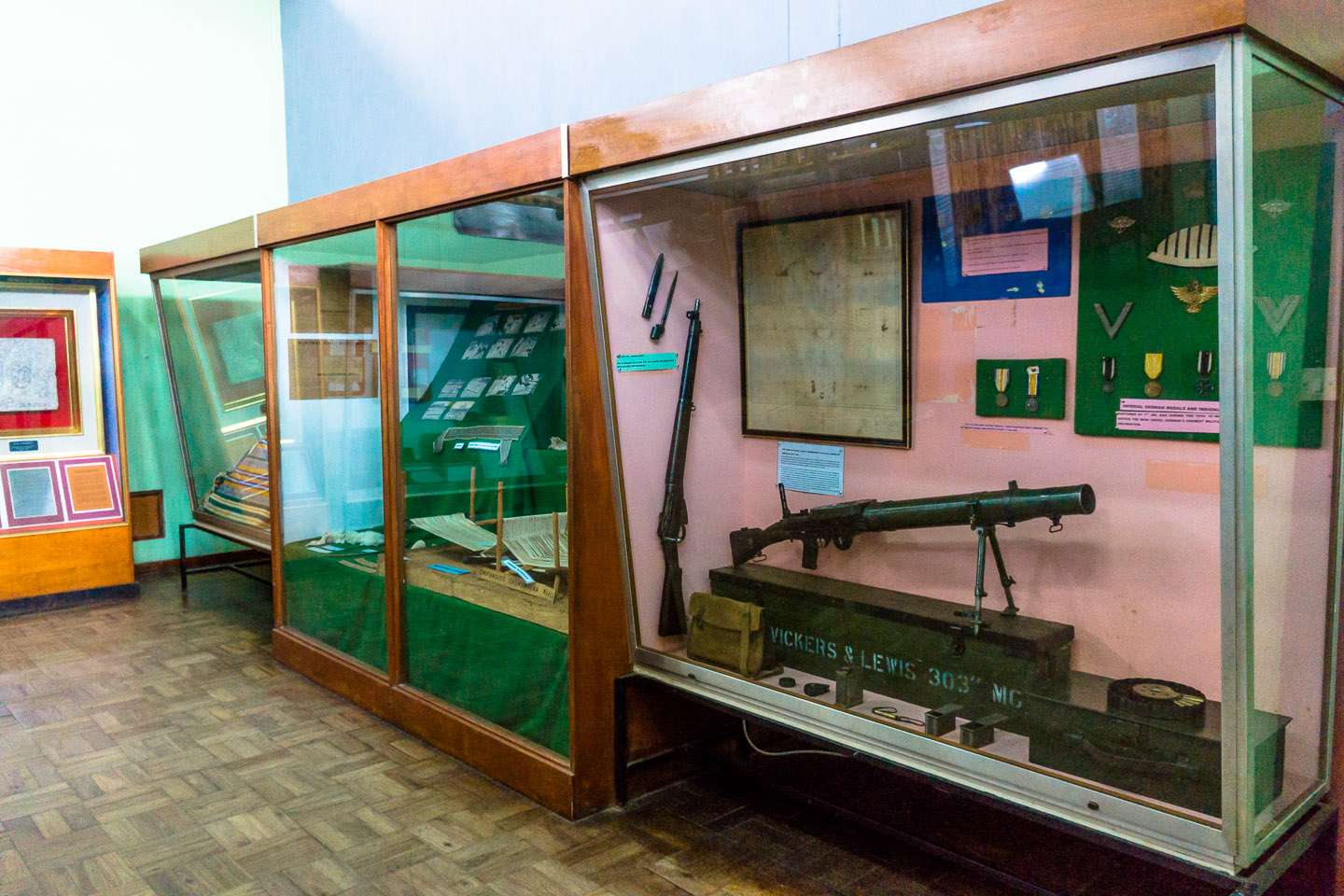
Military exhibit

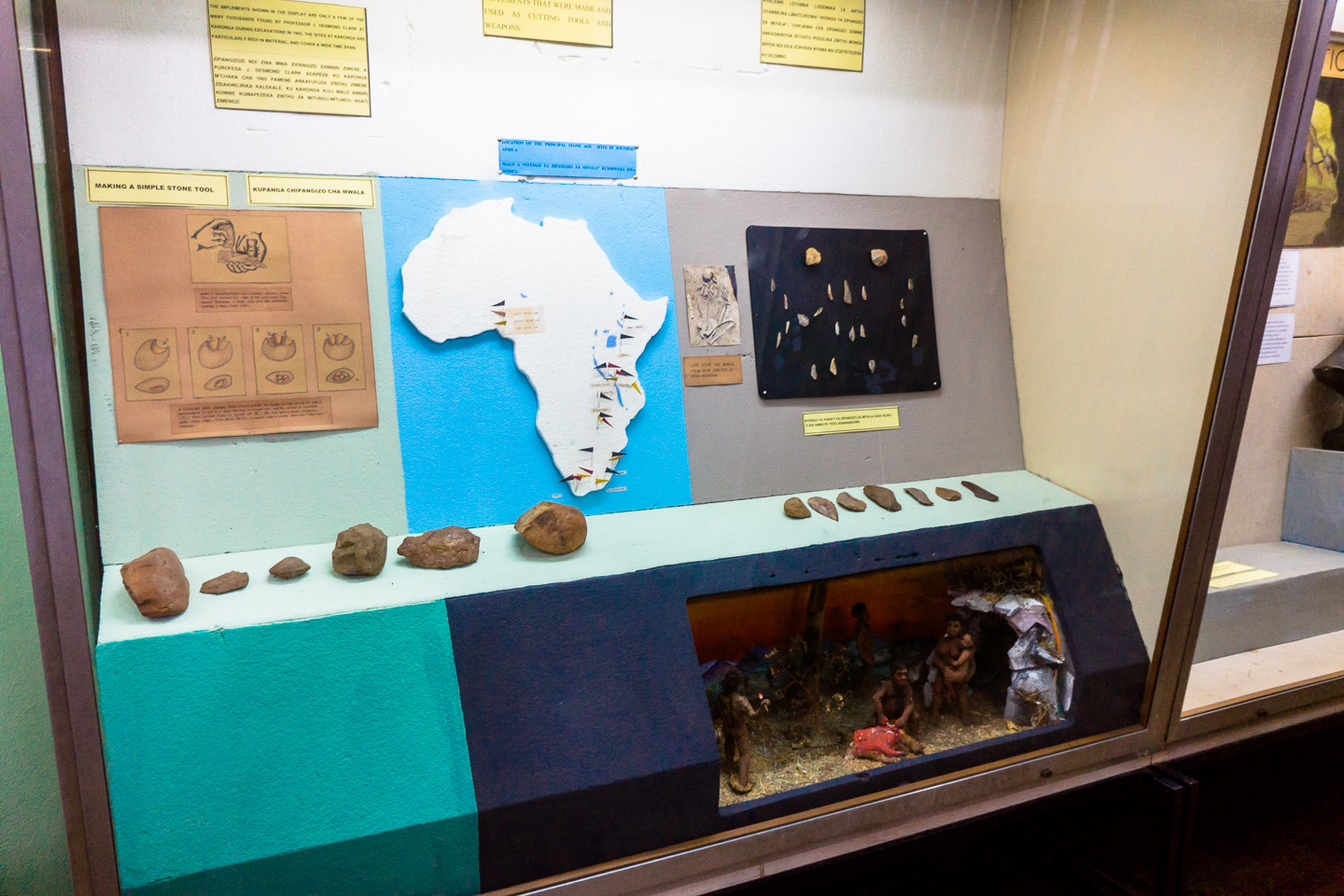
Early humans in Malawi

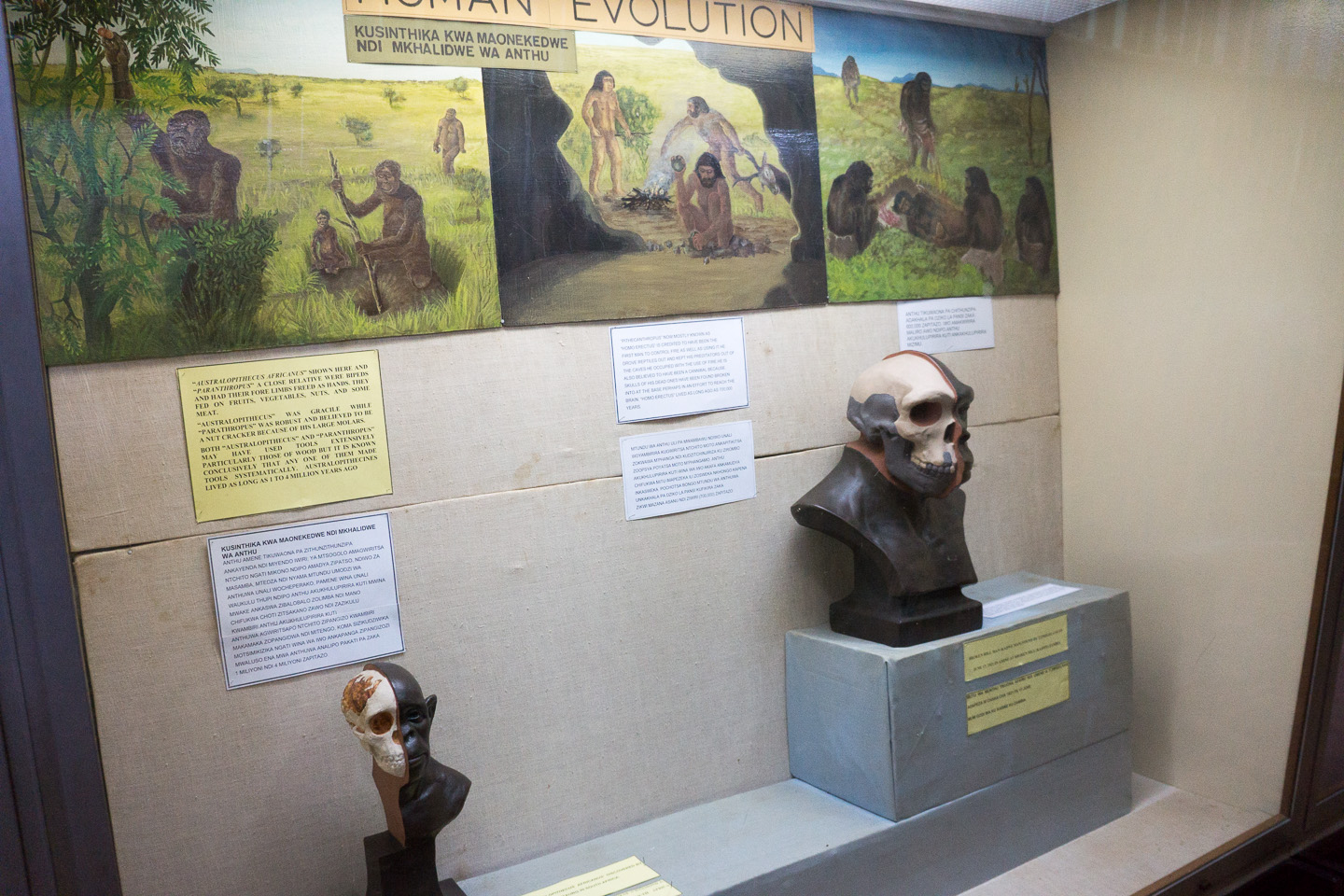
Human evolution exhibit

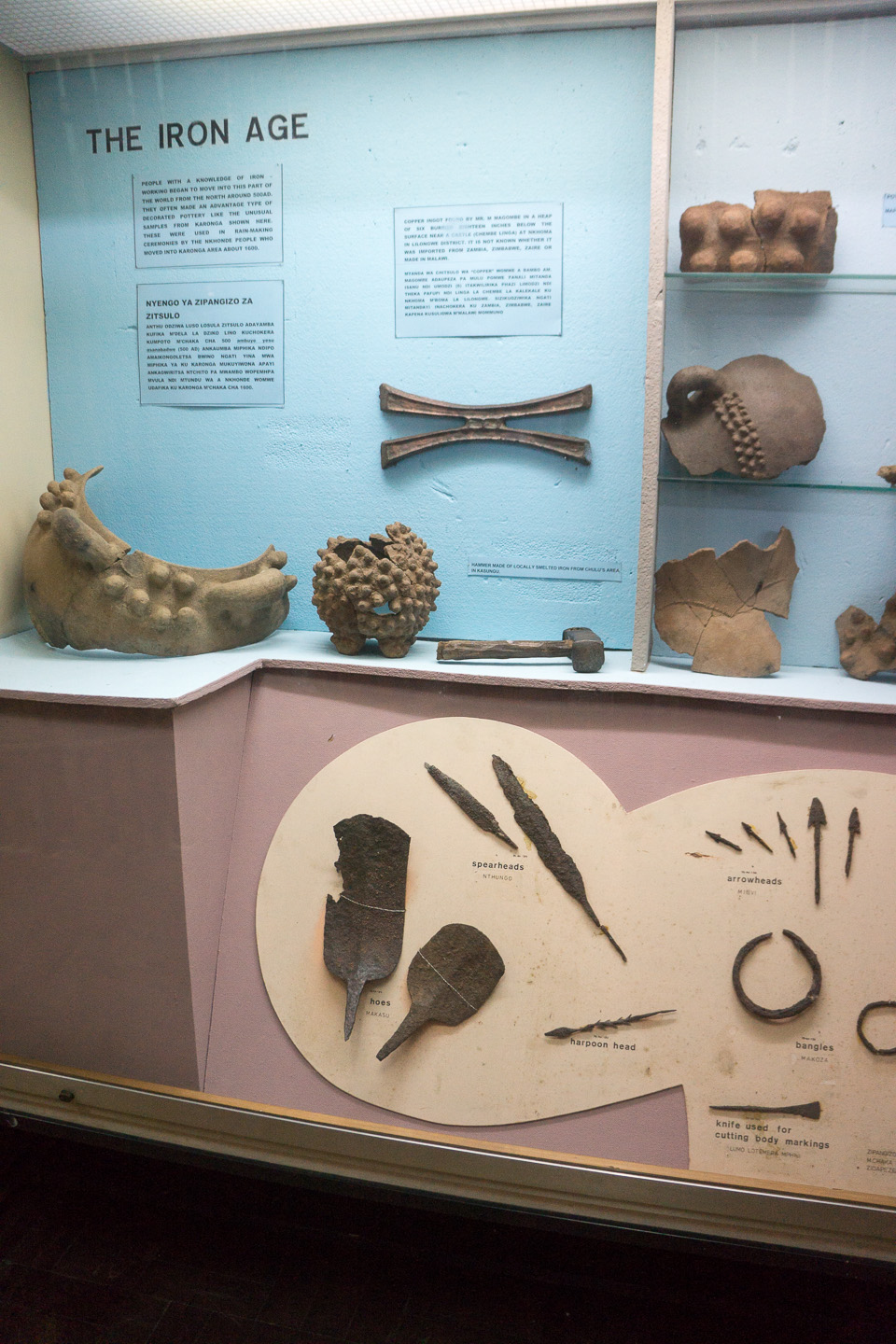
Iron Age exhibit

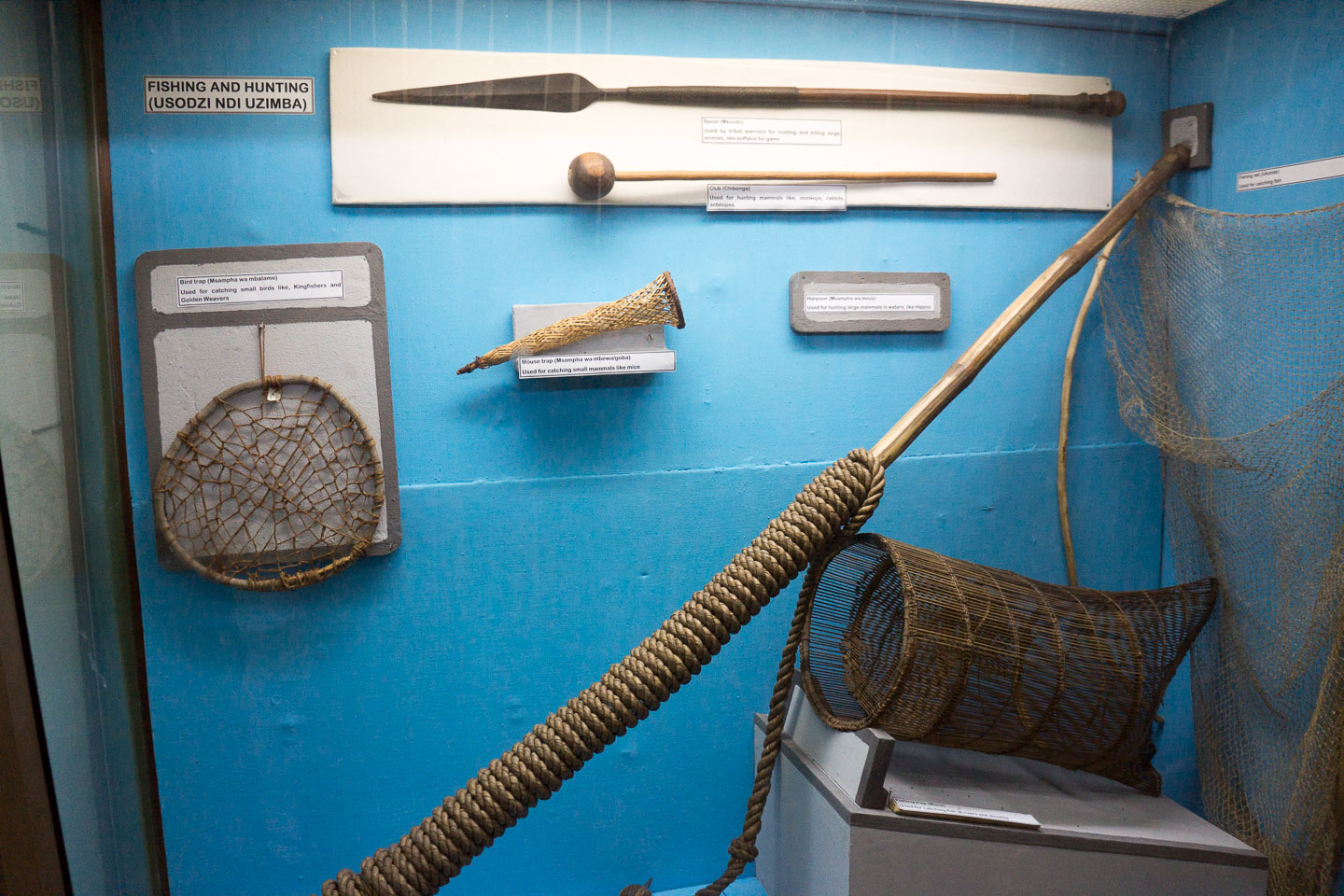
Fishing and hunting tools

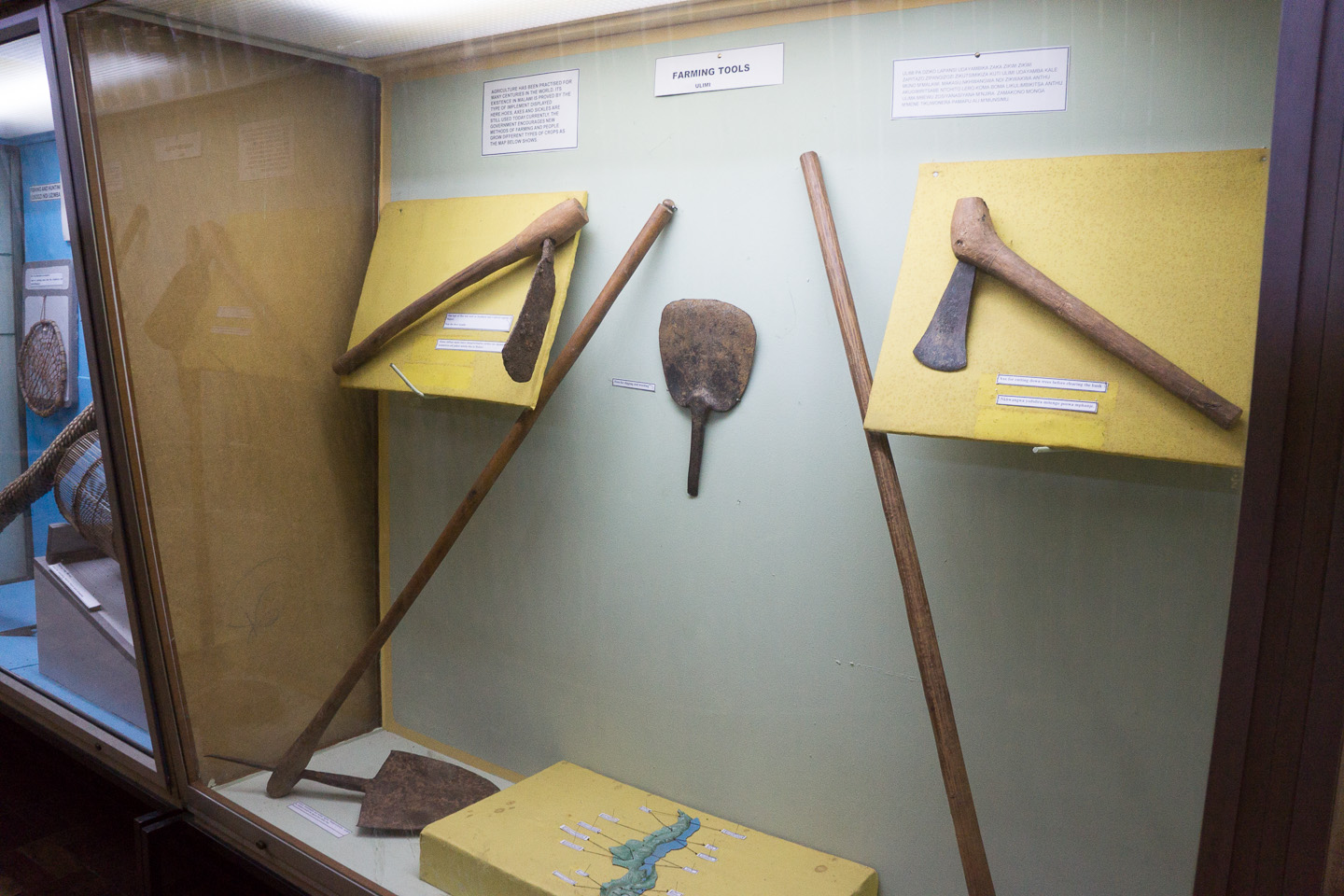
Farming tools

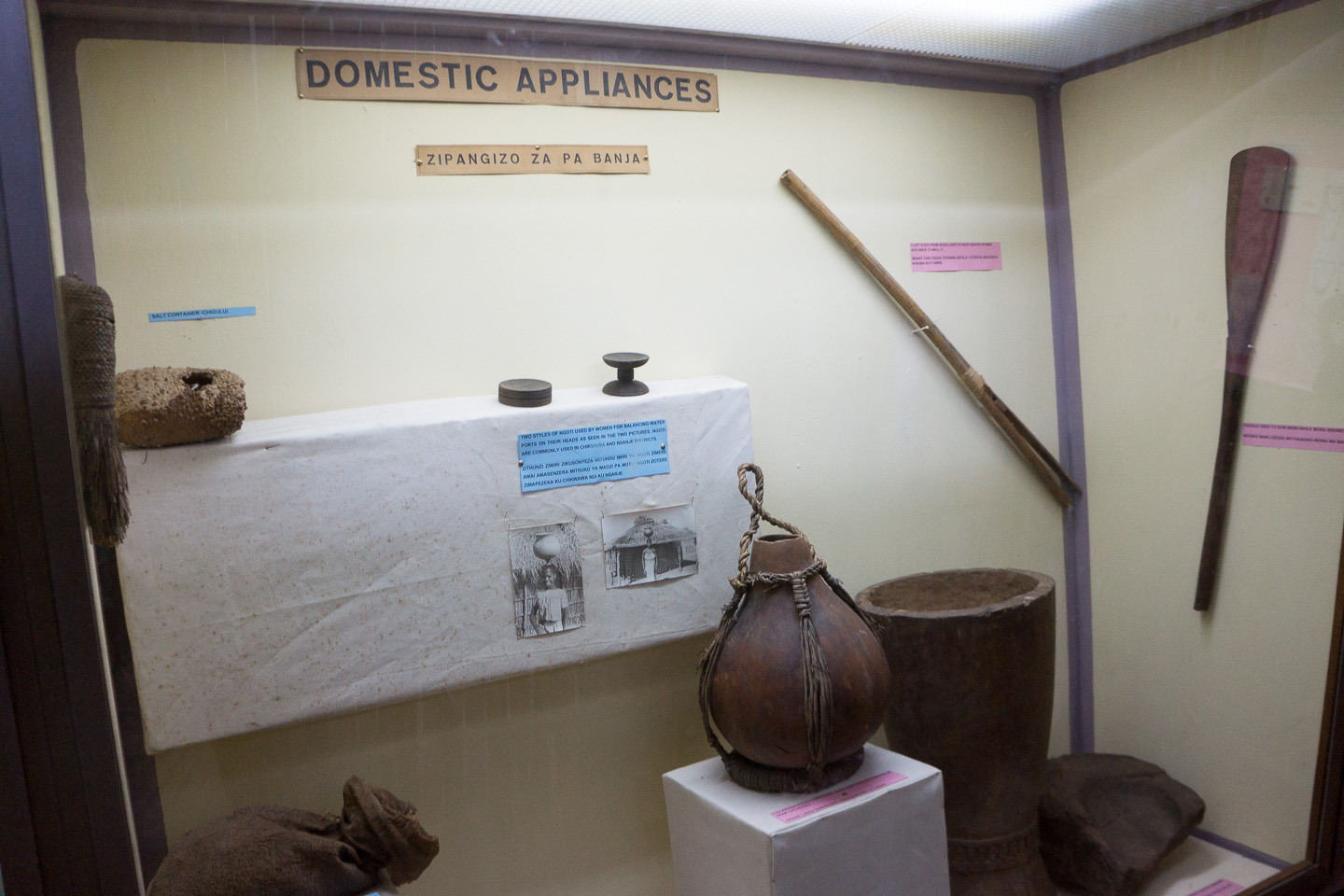
Household appliances

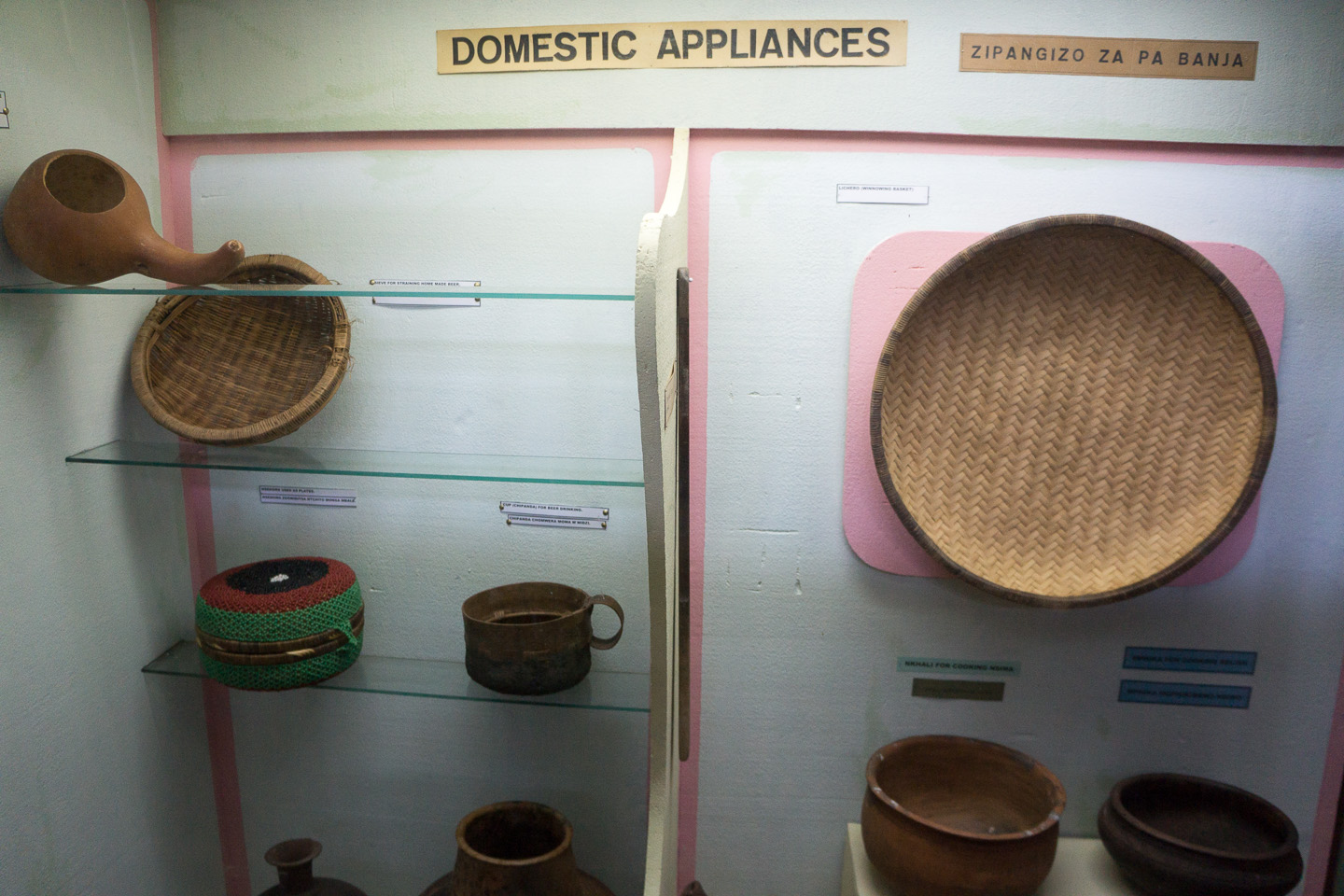
Domestic appliances

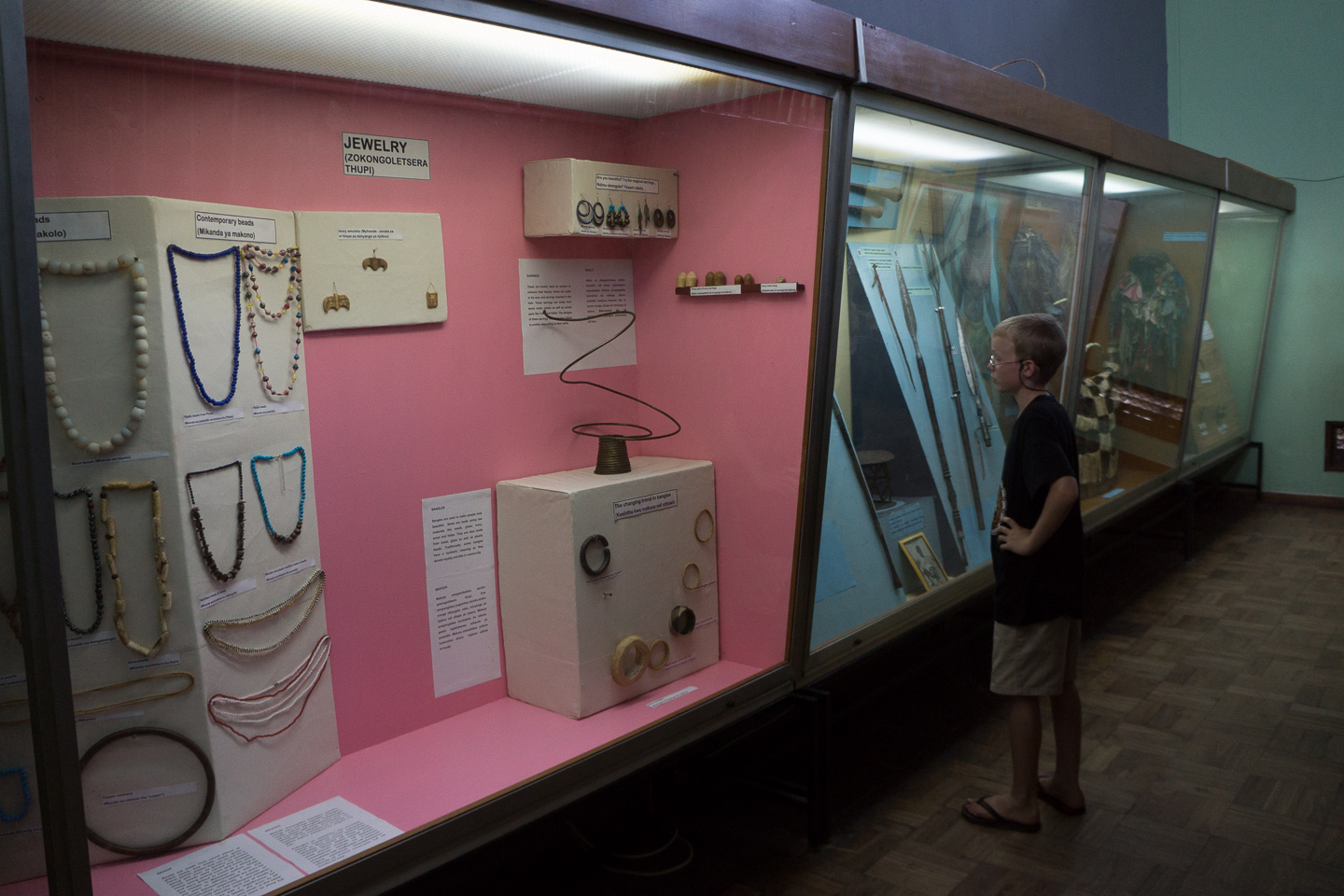
Jewelry exhibit

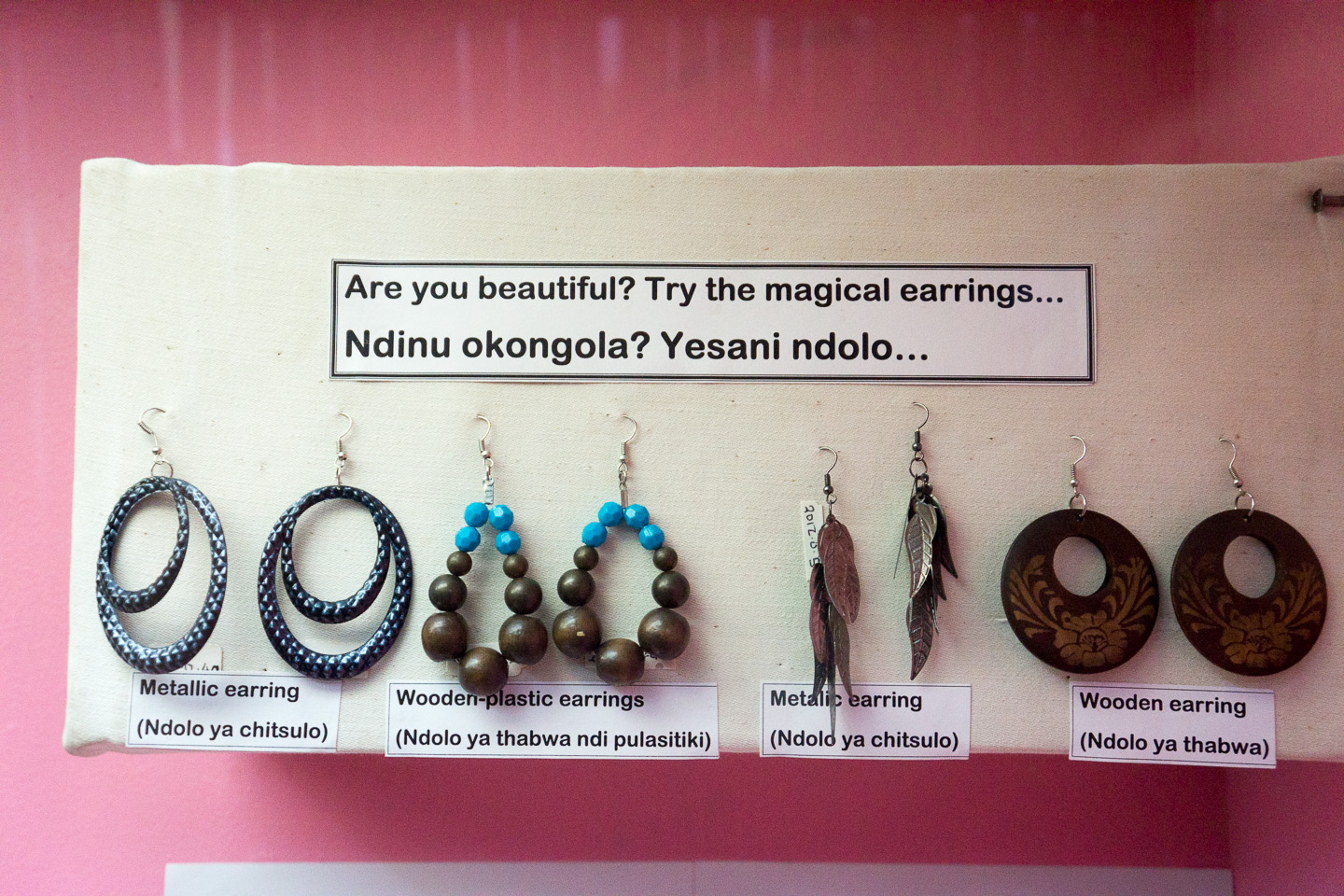
Magical earrings

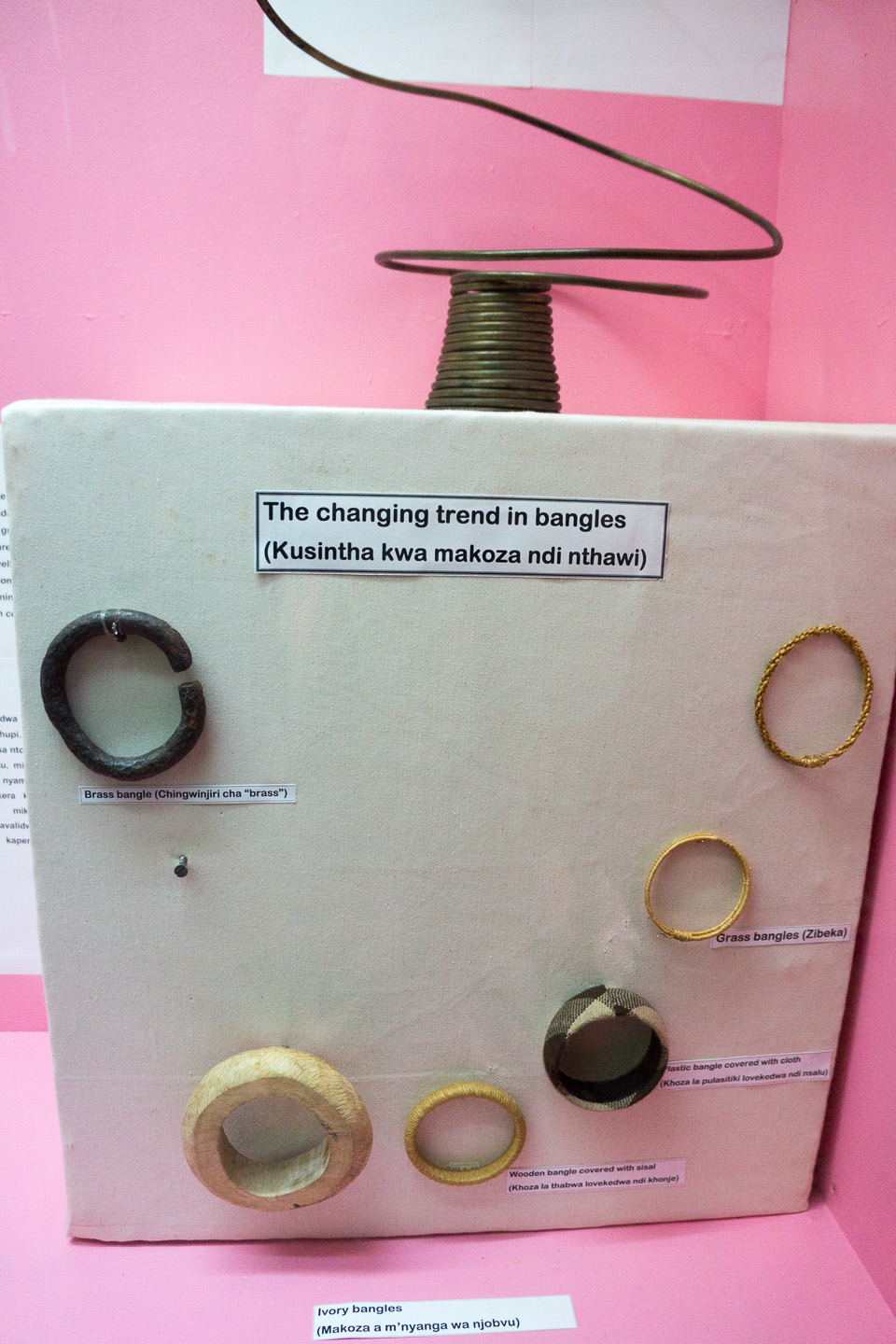
Bangles

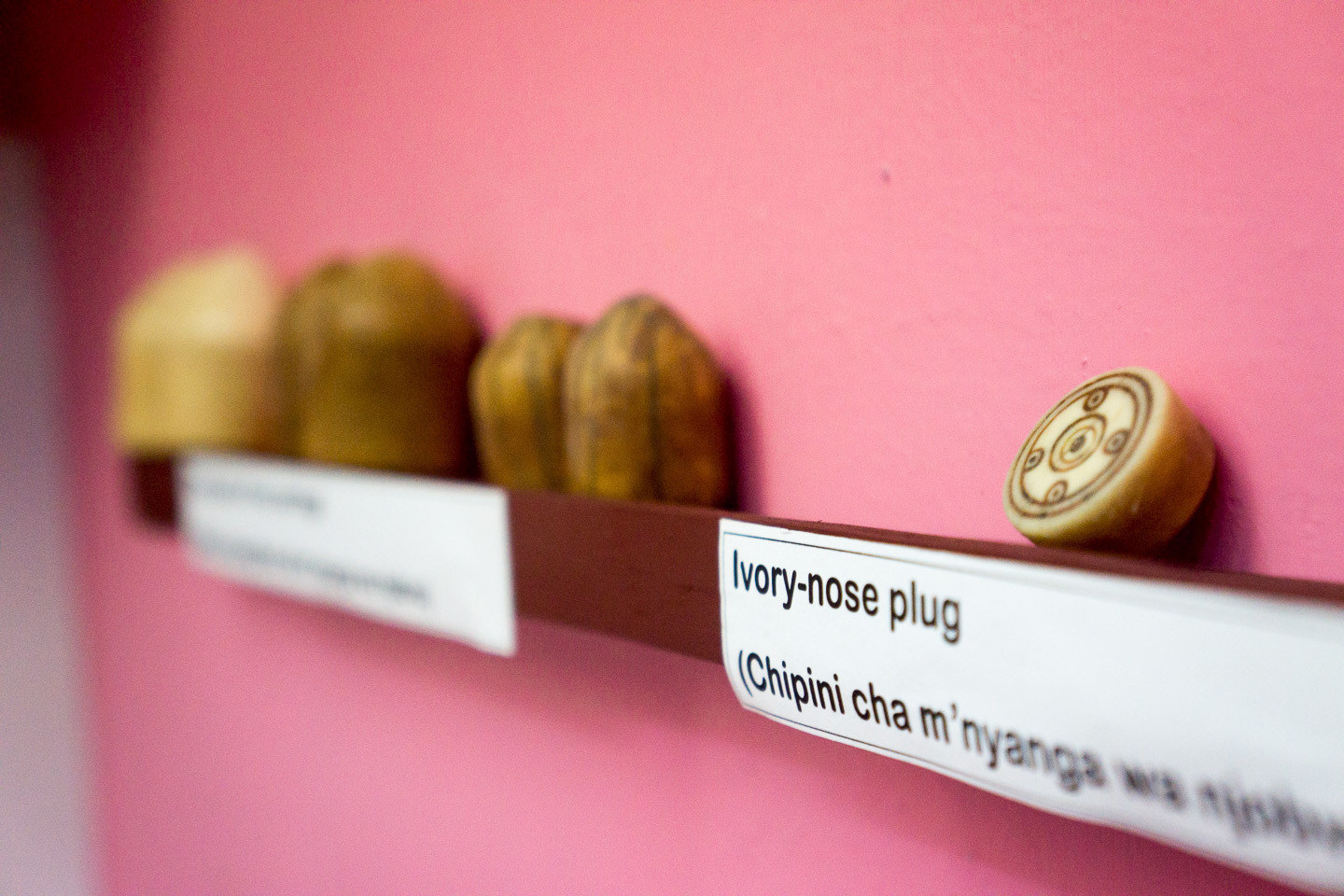
Ivory nose plug and earrings

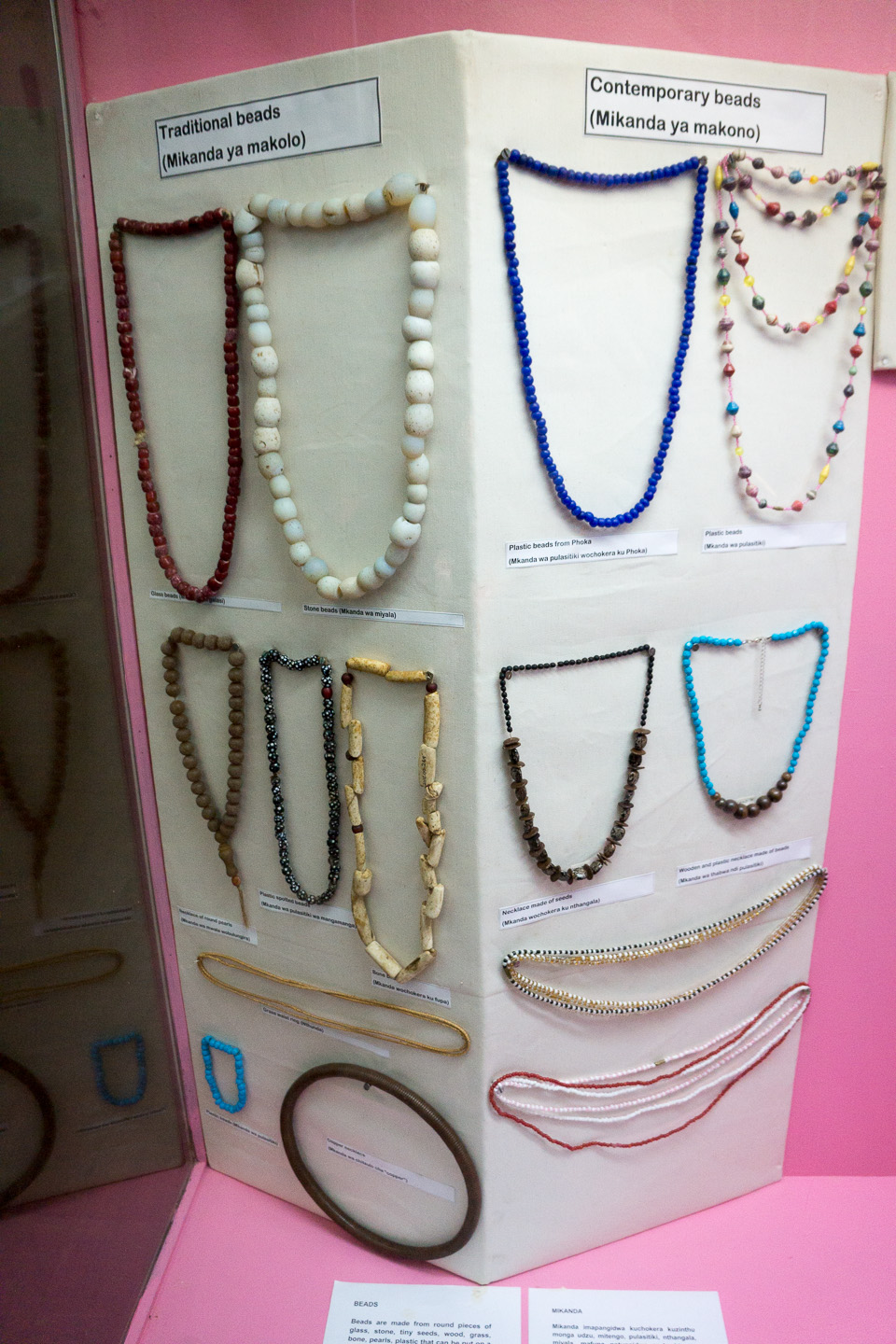
Traditional beads

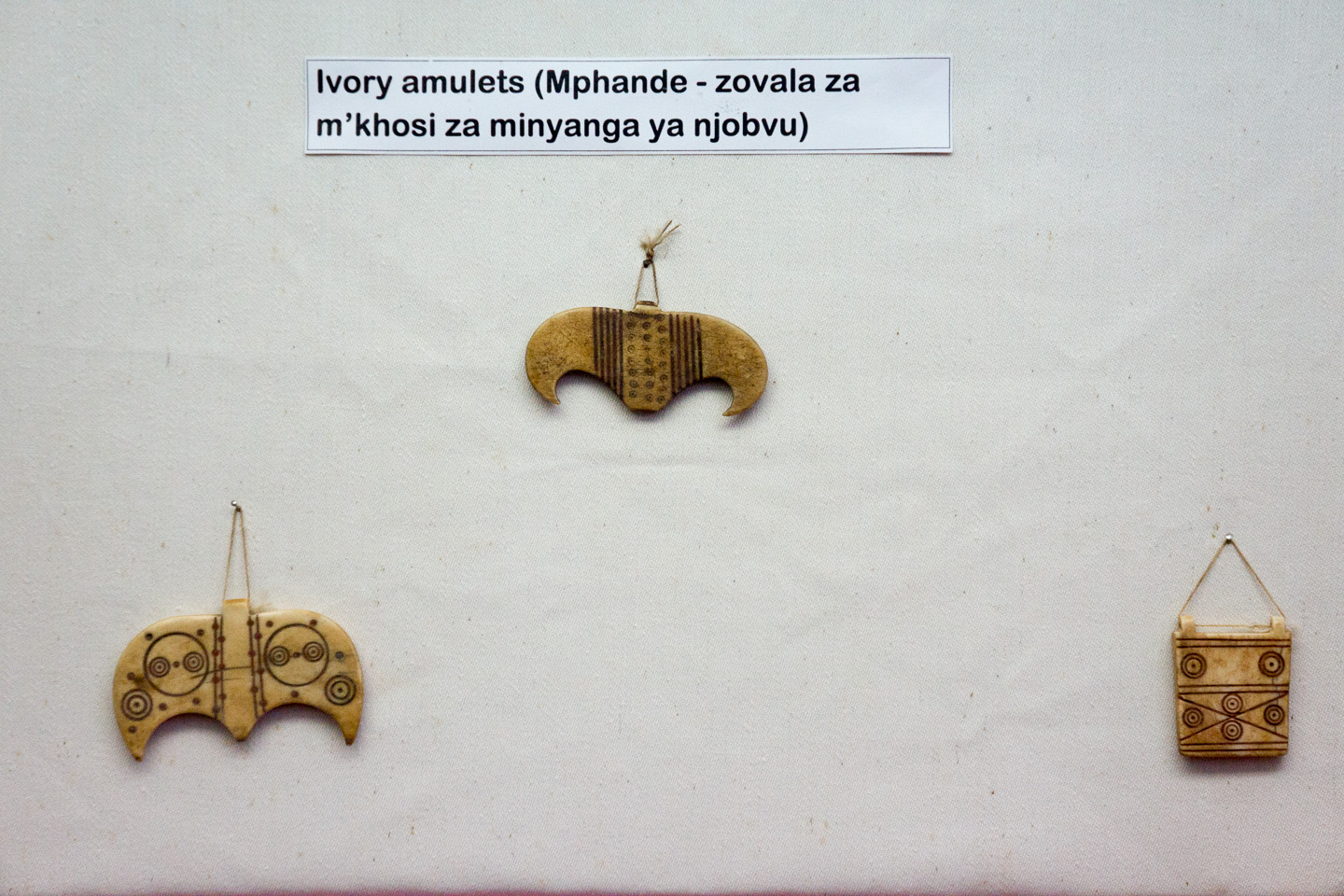
Amulets

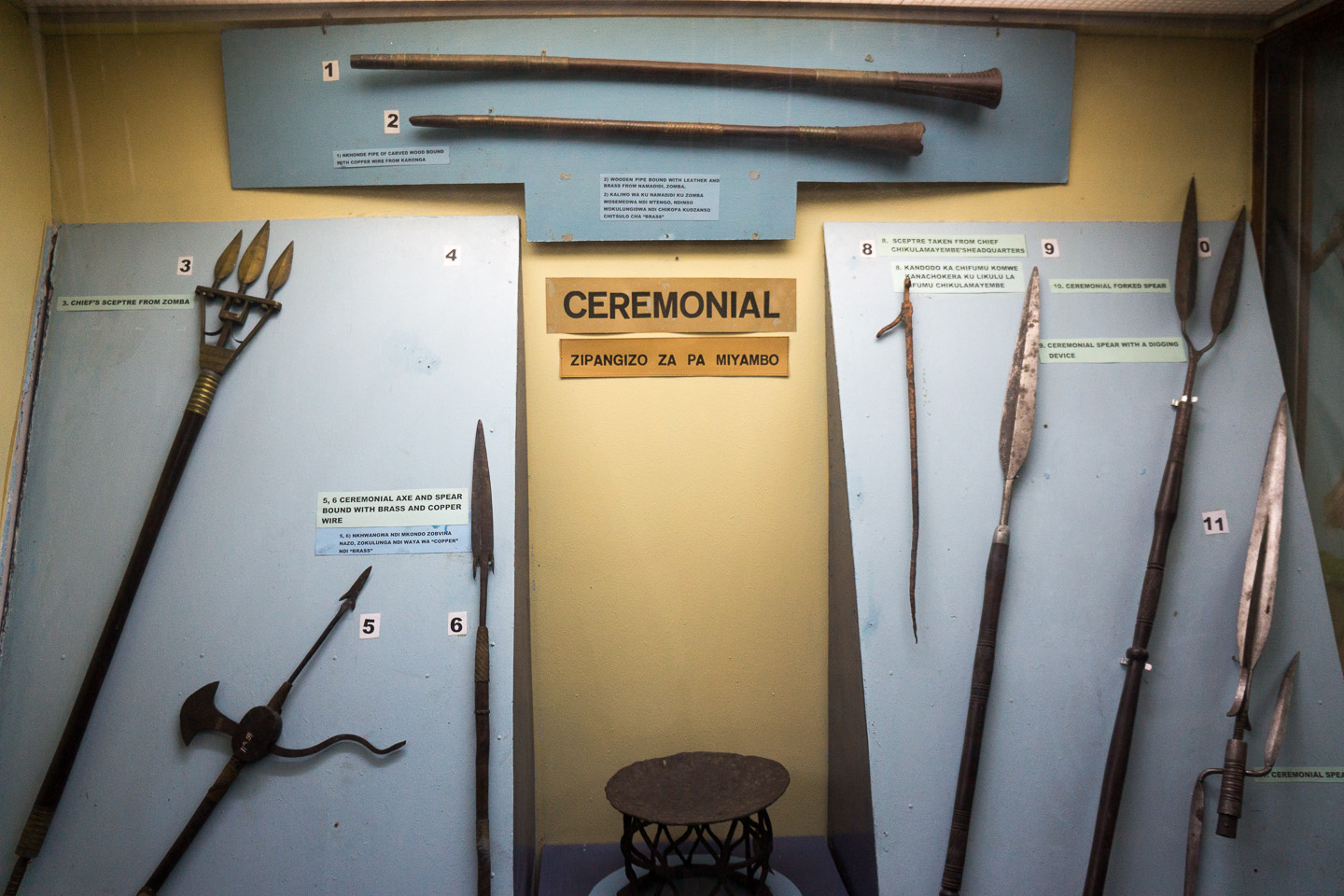
Ceremonial spears

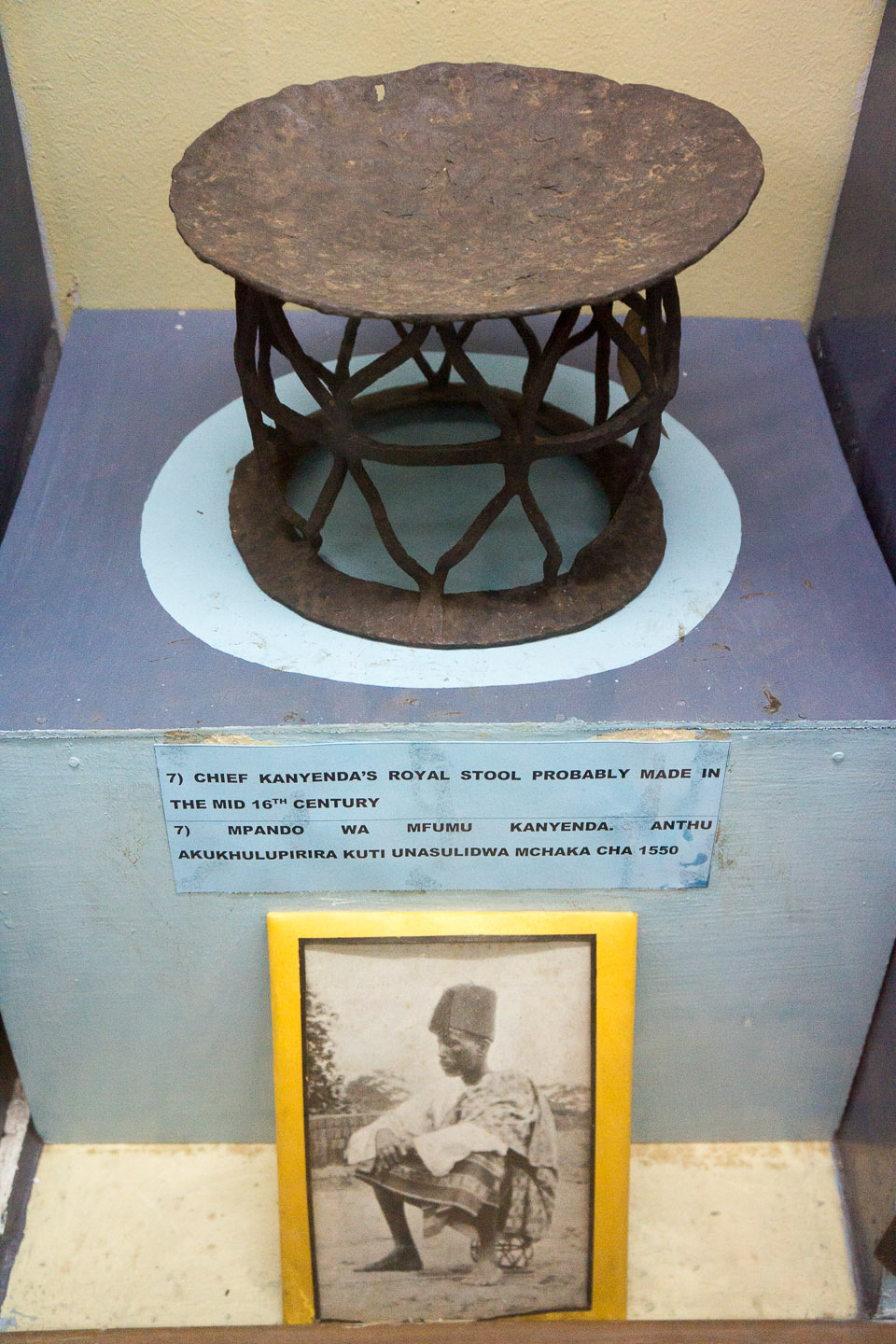
Chief's stool

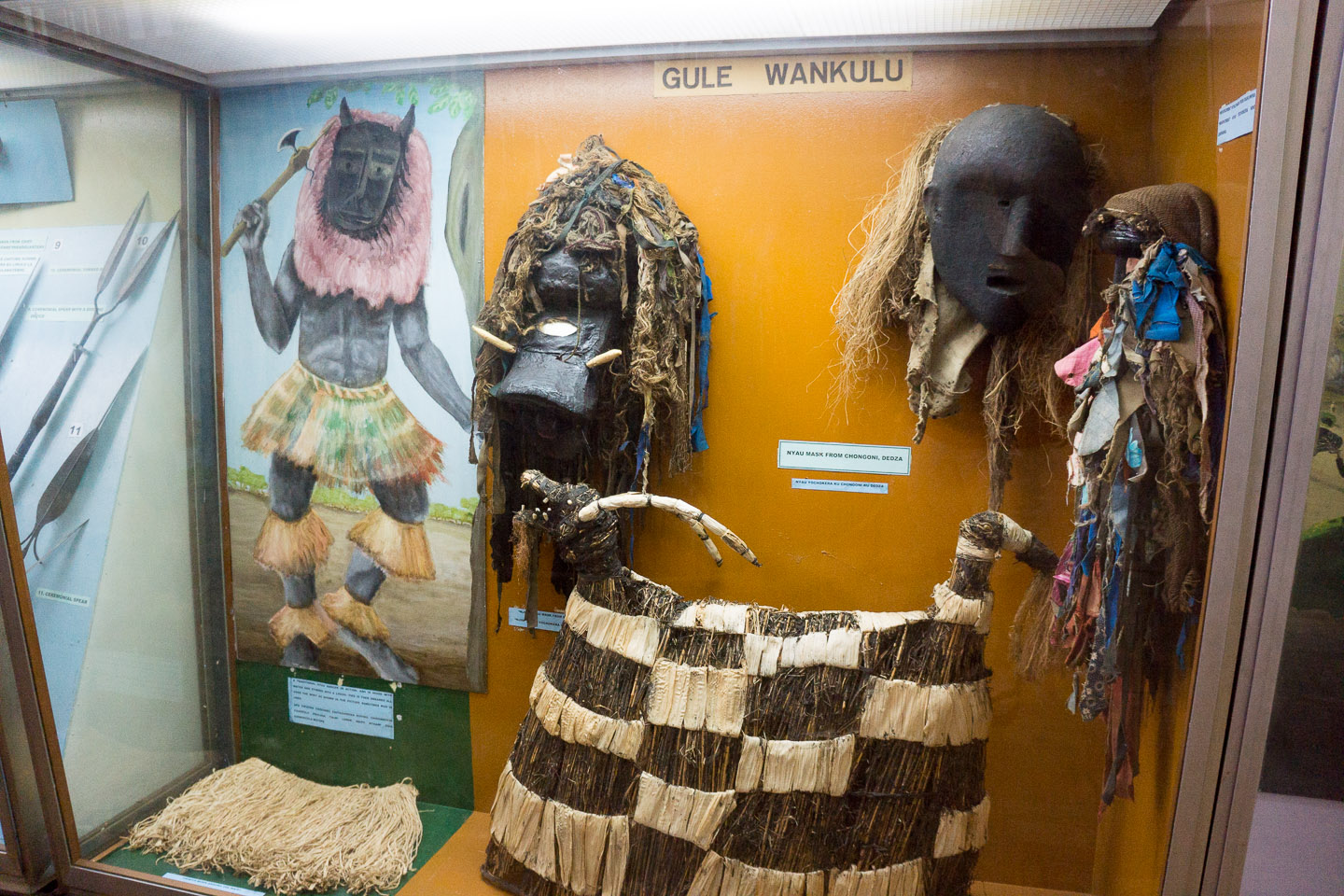
Gule Wankulu exhibit

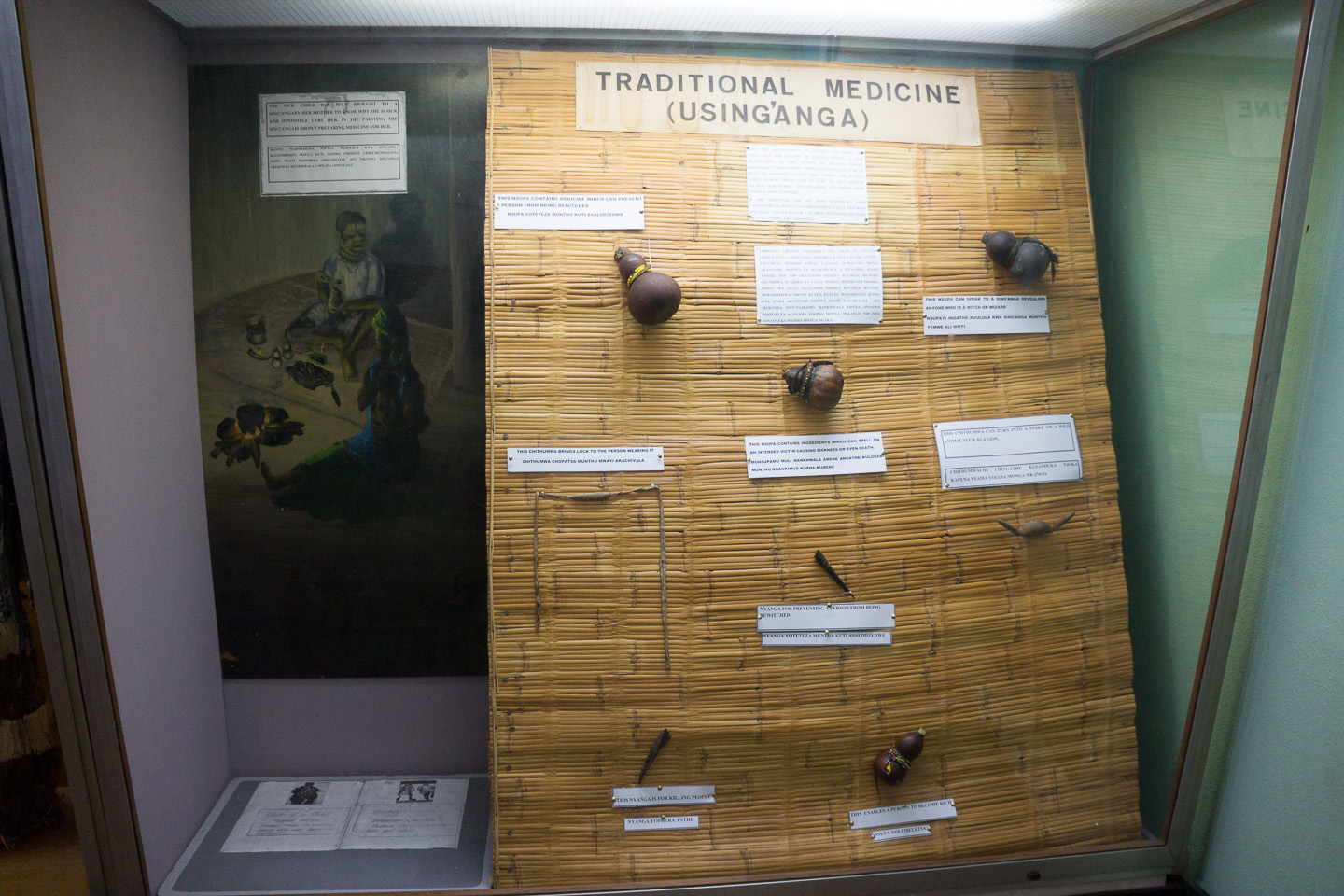
Traditional medicine exhibit

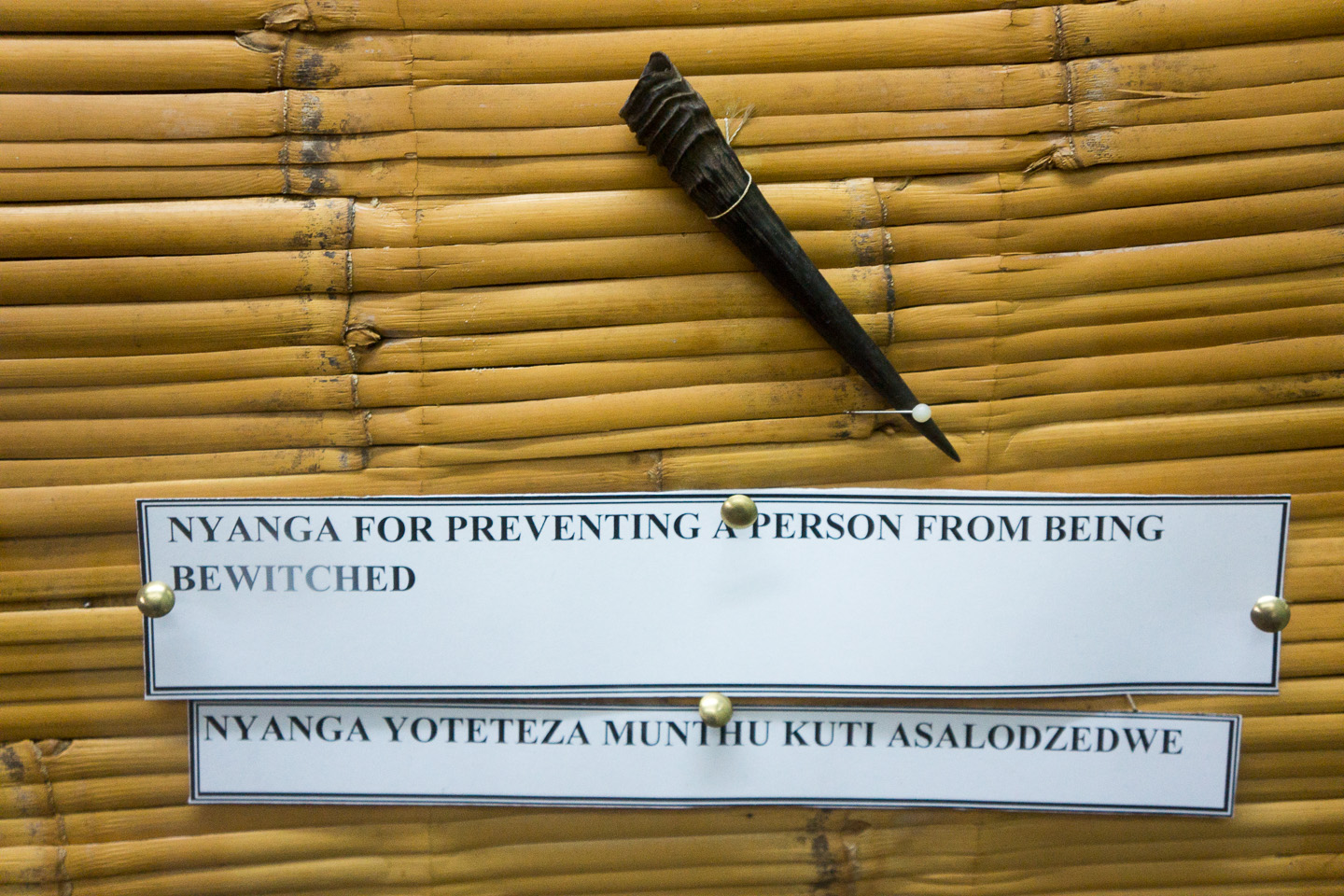
Traditional medicine: nyanga

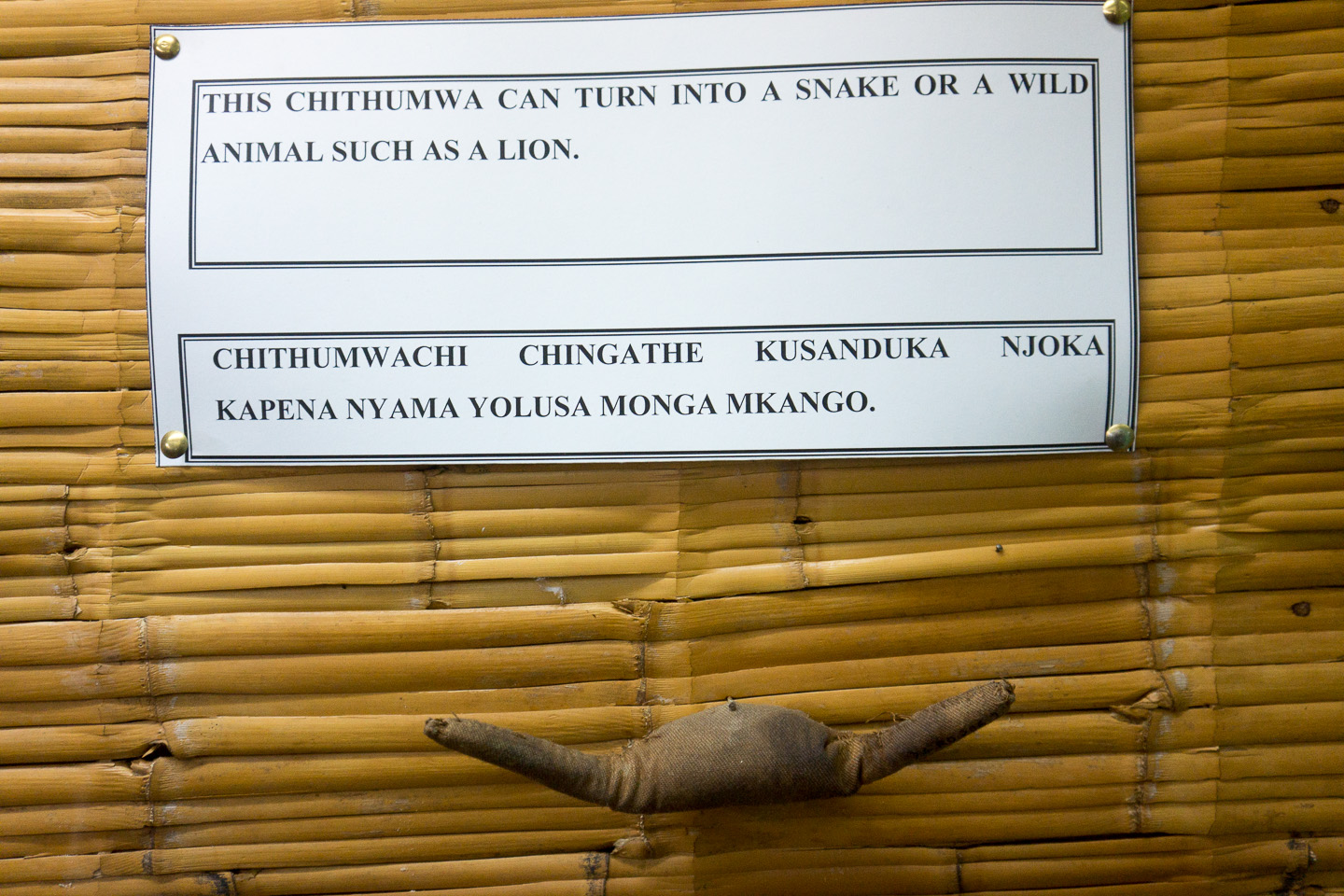
Traditional medicine: chithumwa

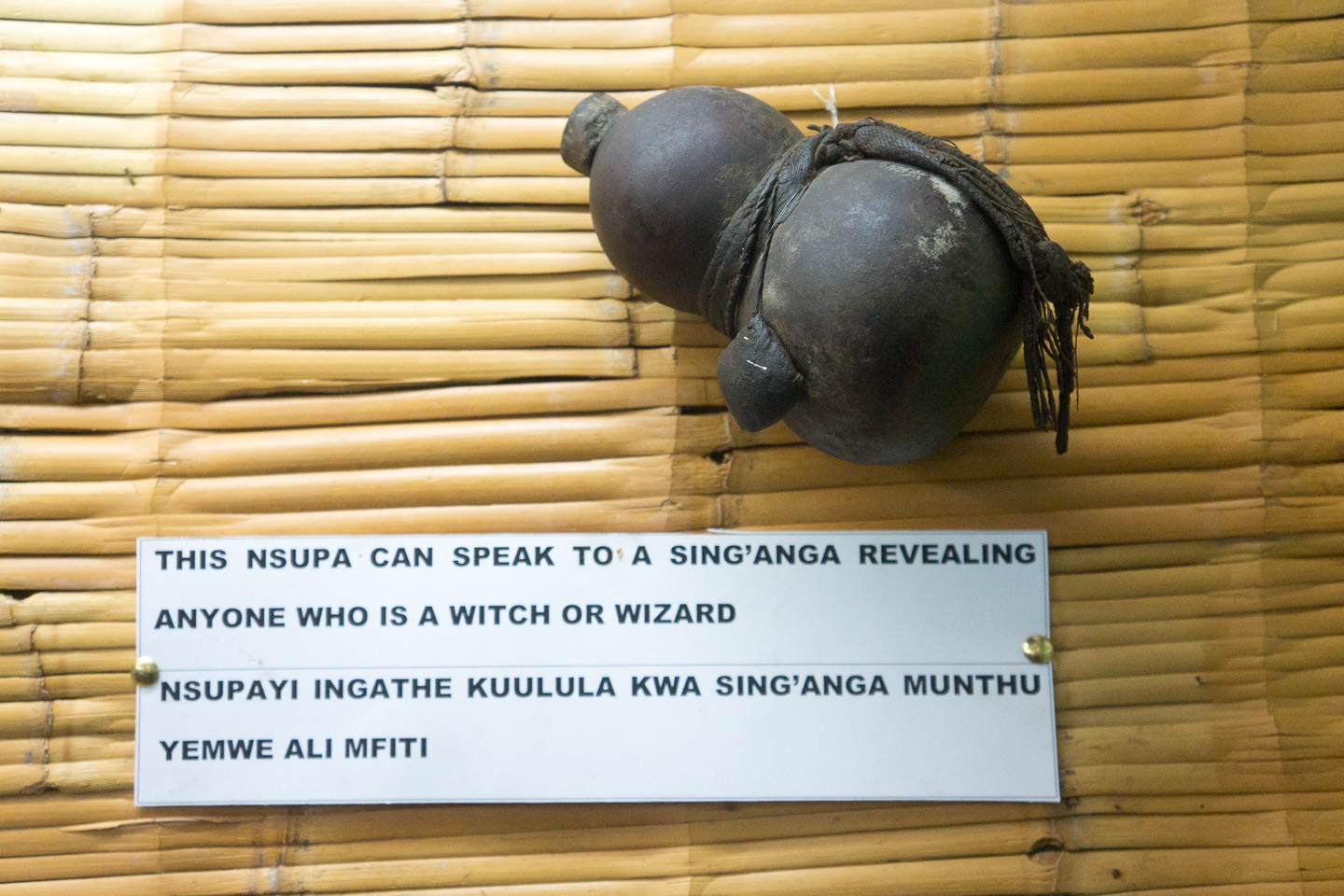
Traditional medicine: nsupa

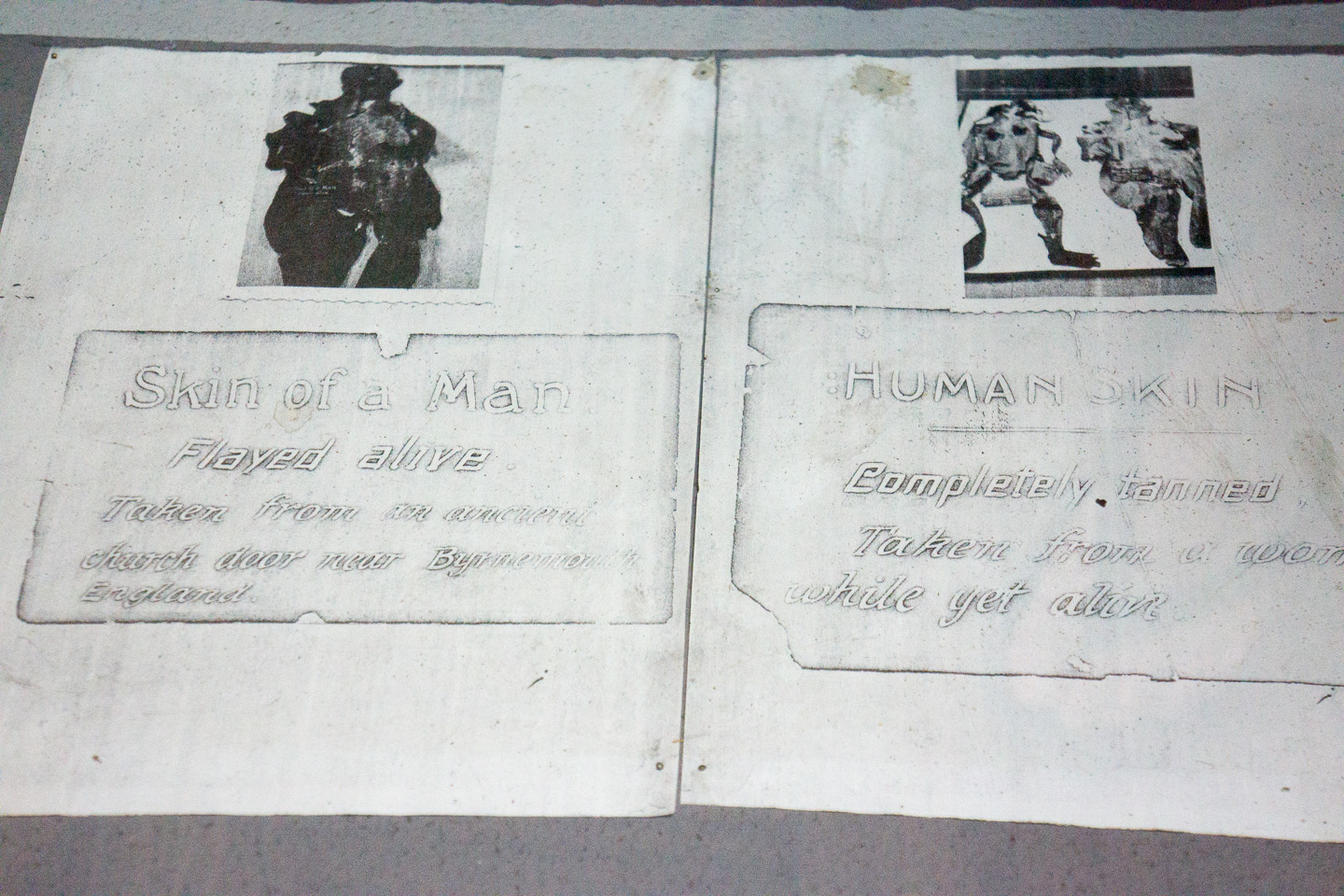
Human skin photo

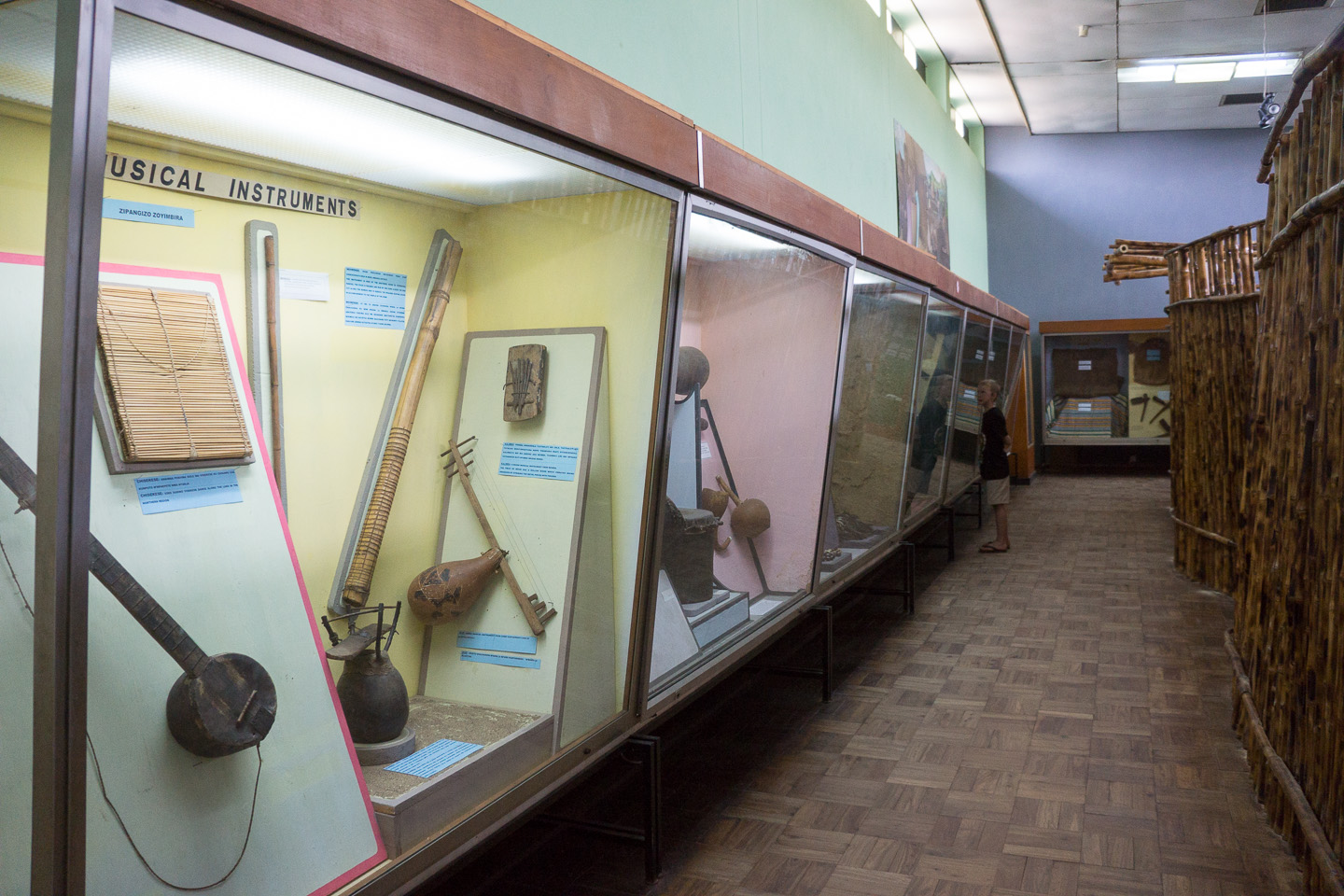
Exhibits behind glass

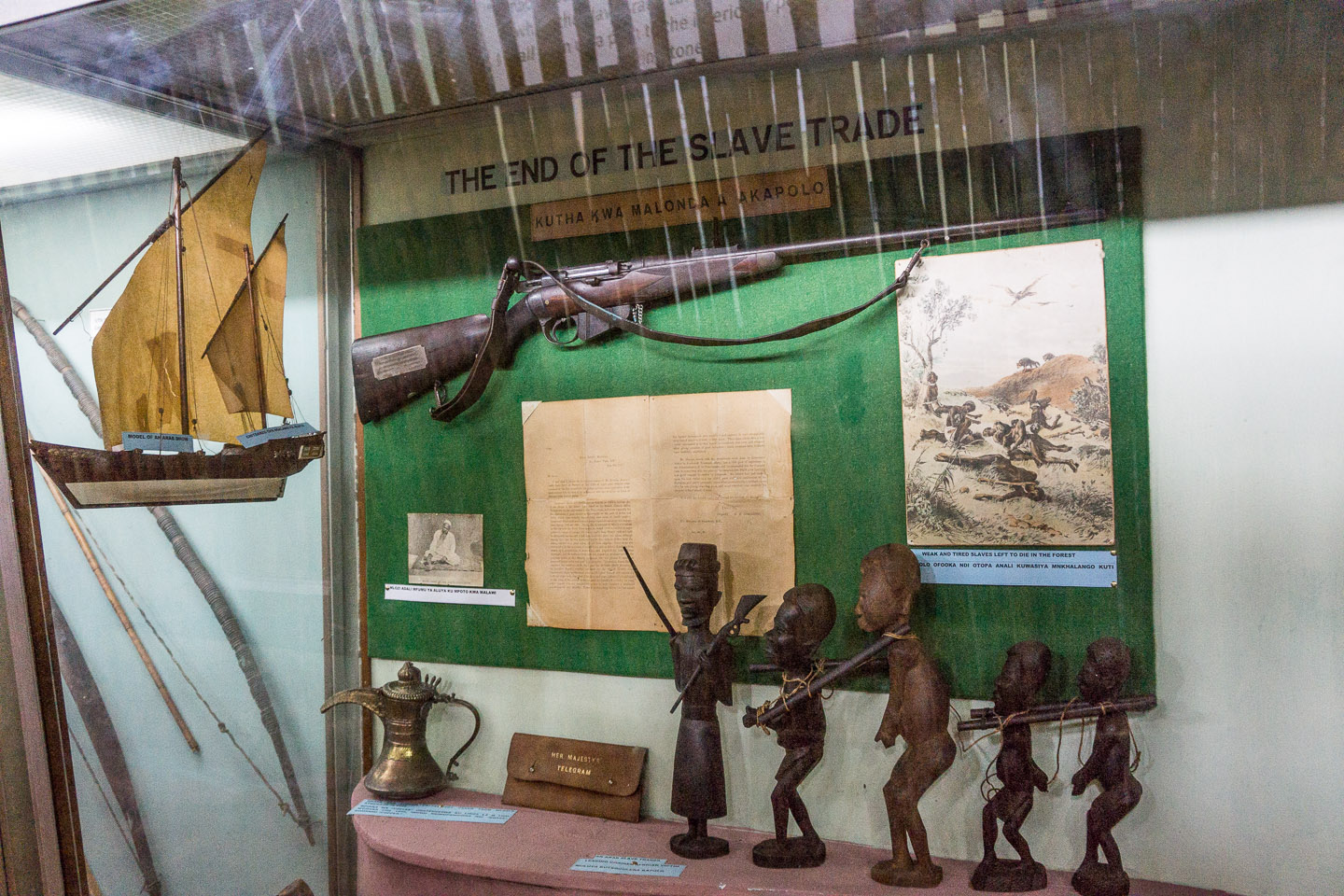
Slave trade exhibit

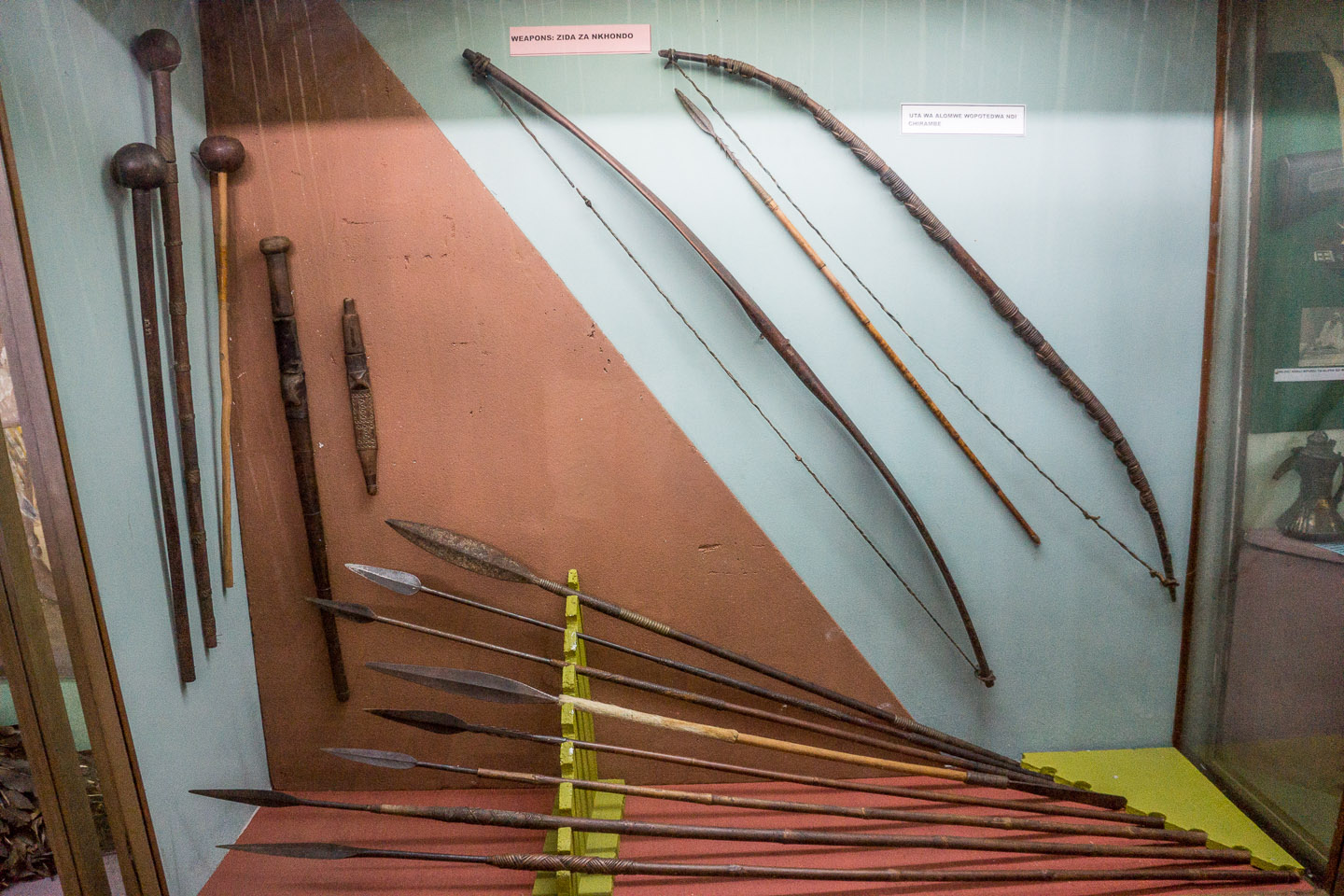
Weapons

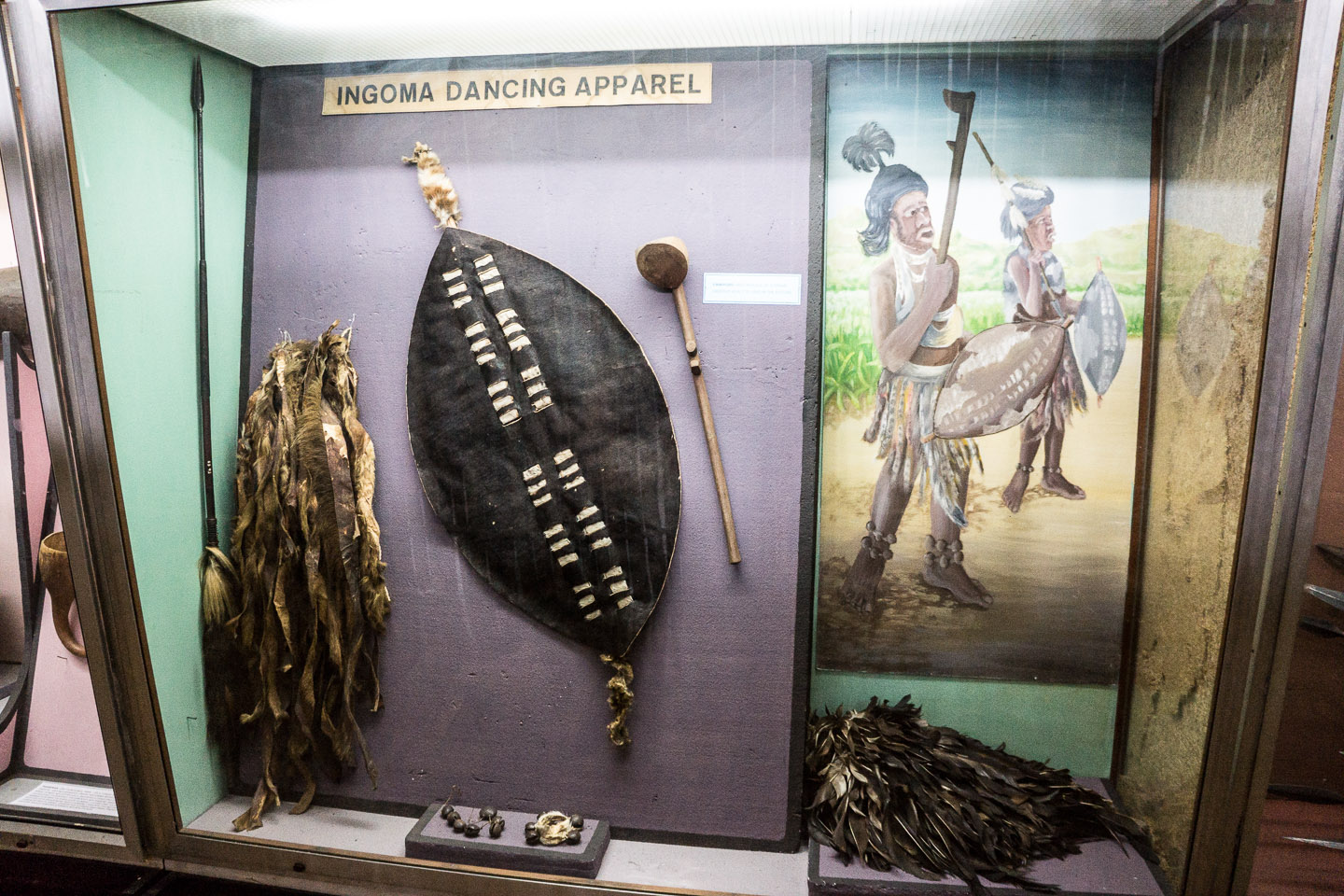
Dancing apparel

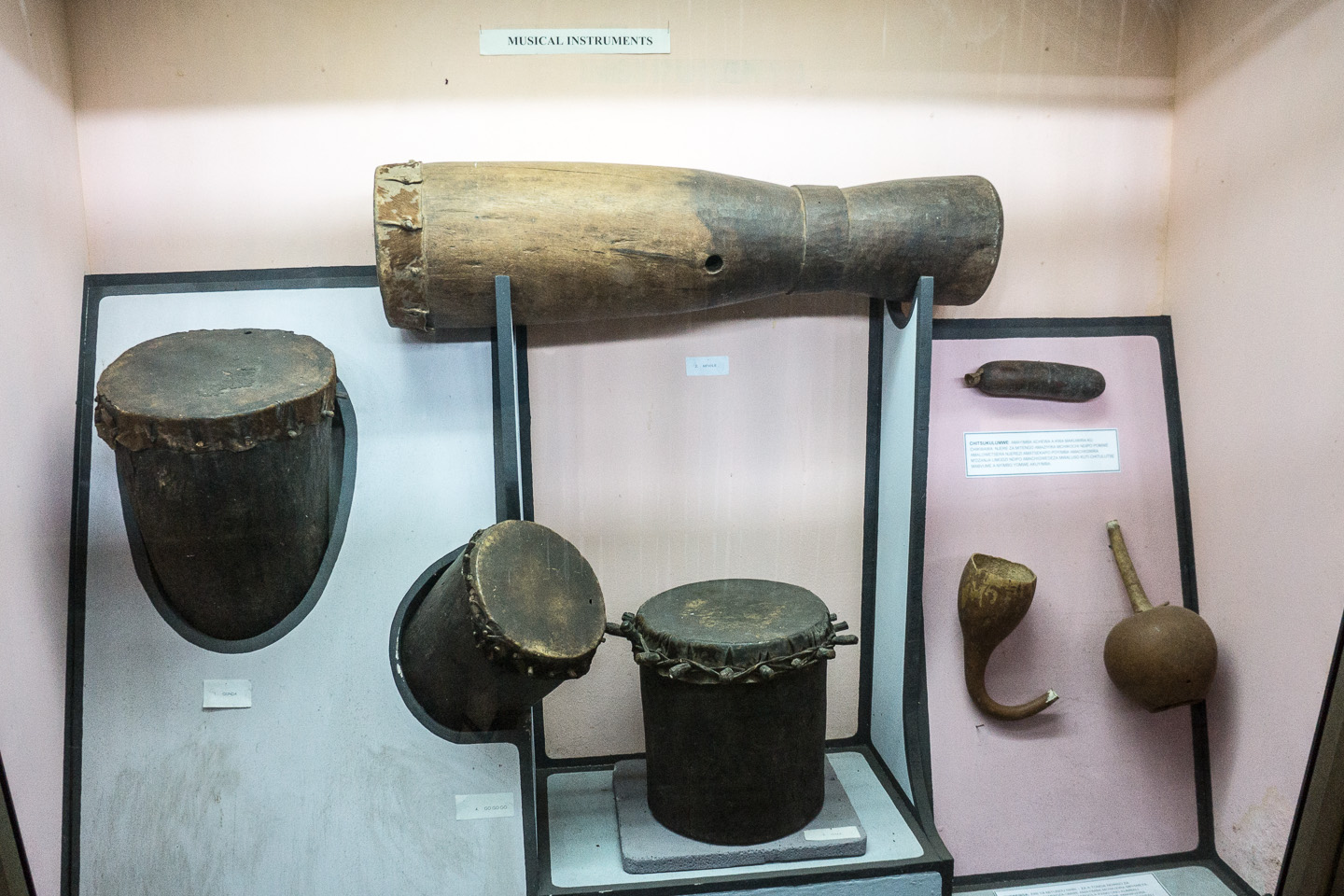
Drums exhibit

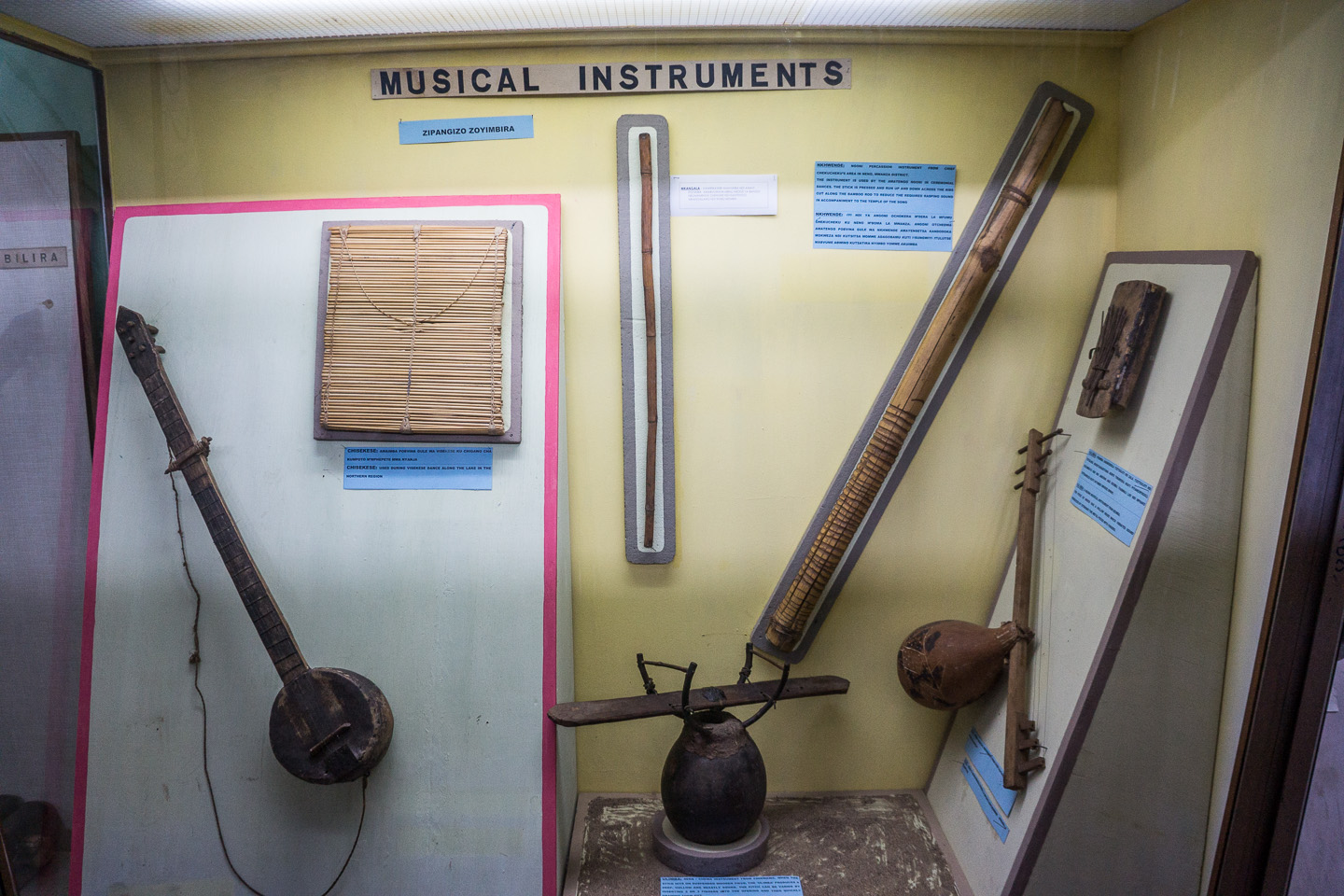
Musical instrument exhibit

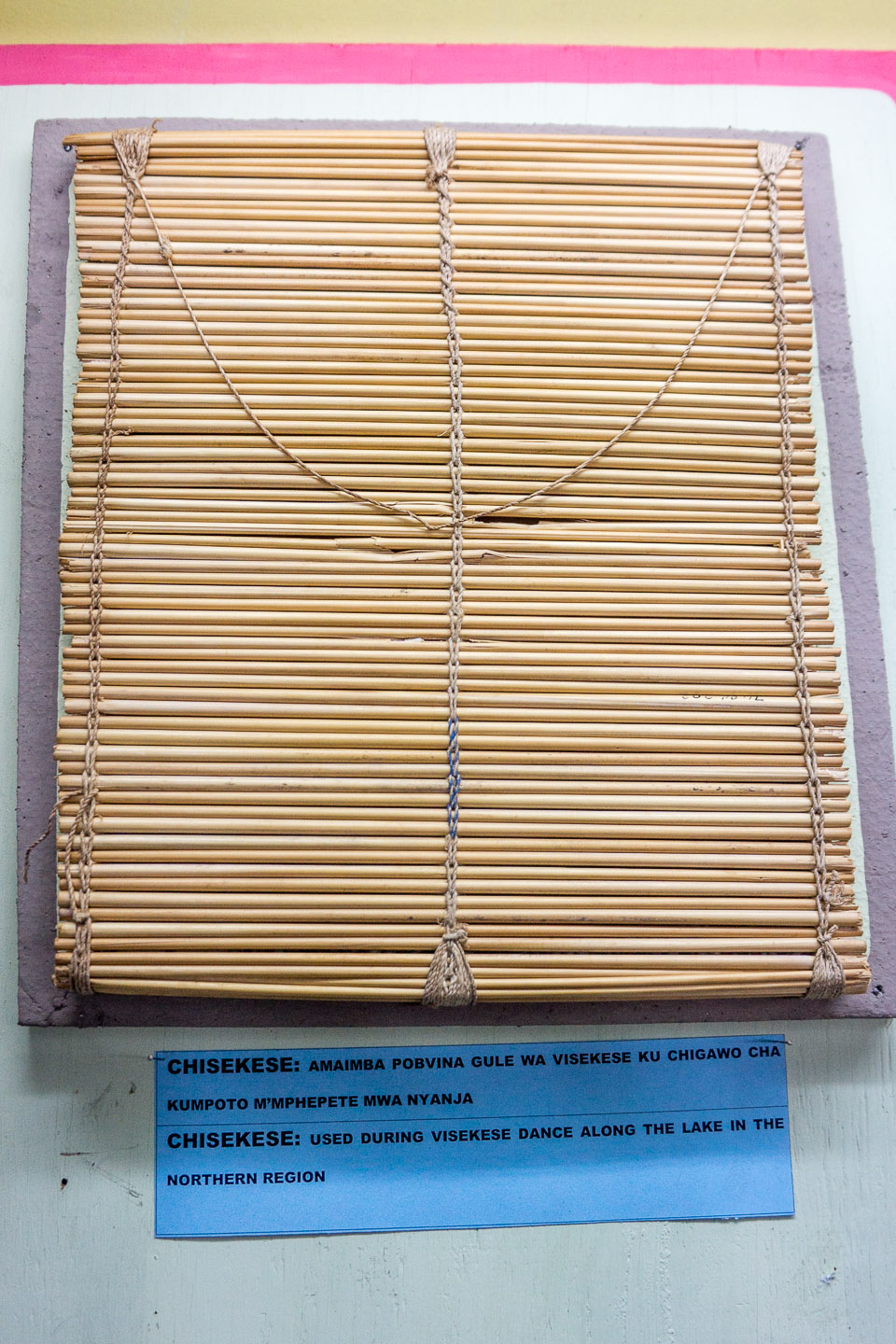
Musical instrument chisekese

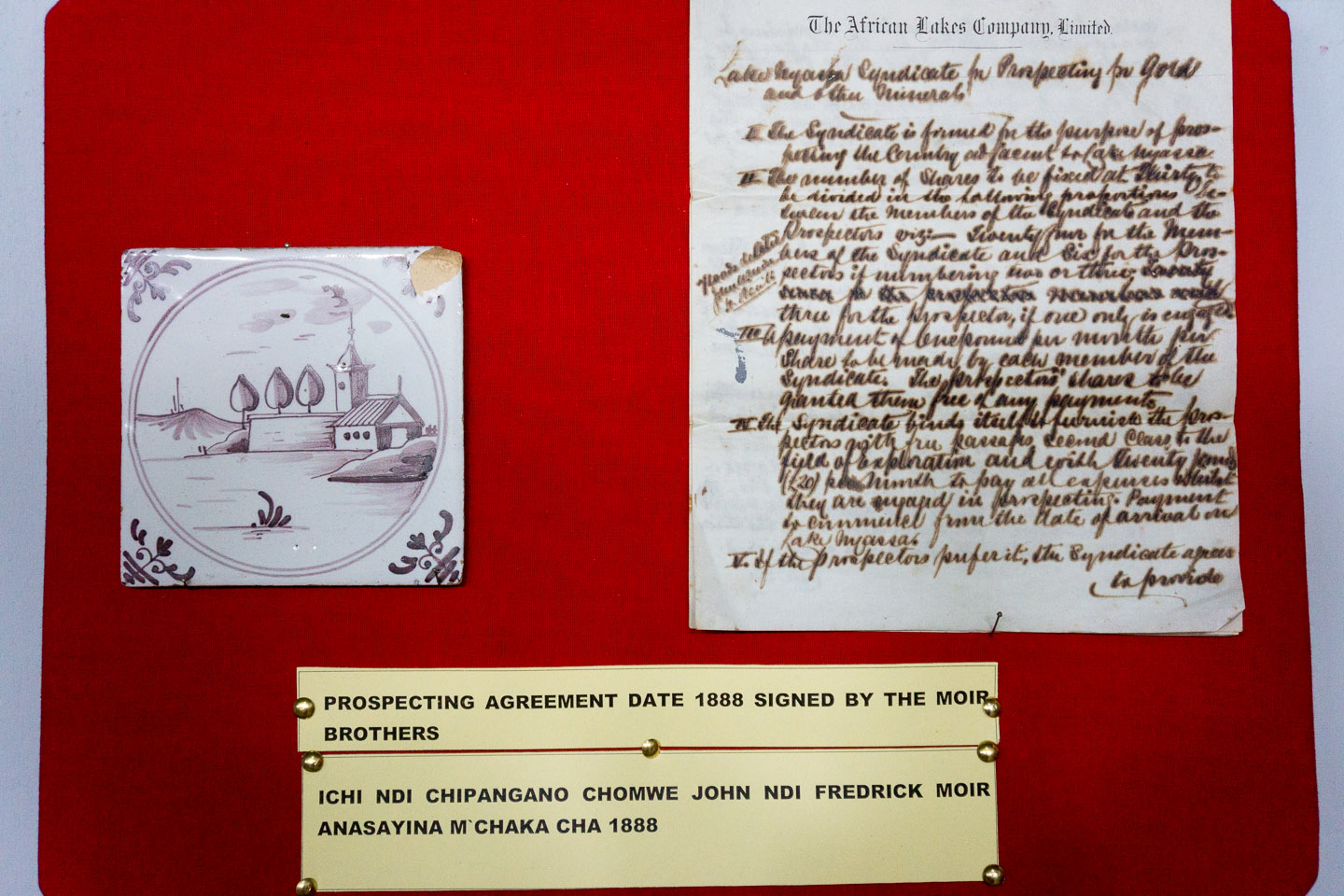
Moir Brothers agreement

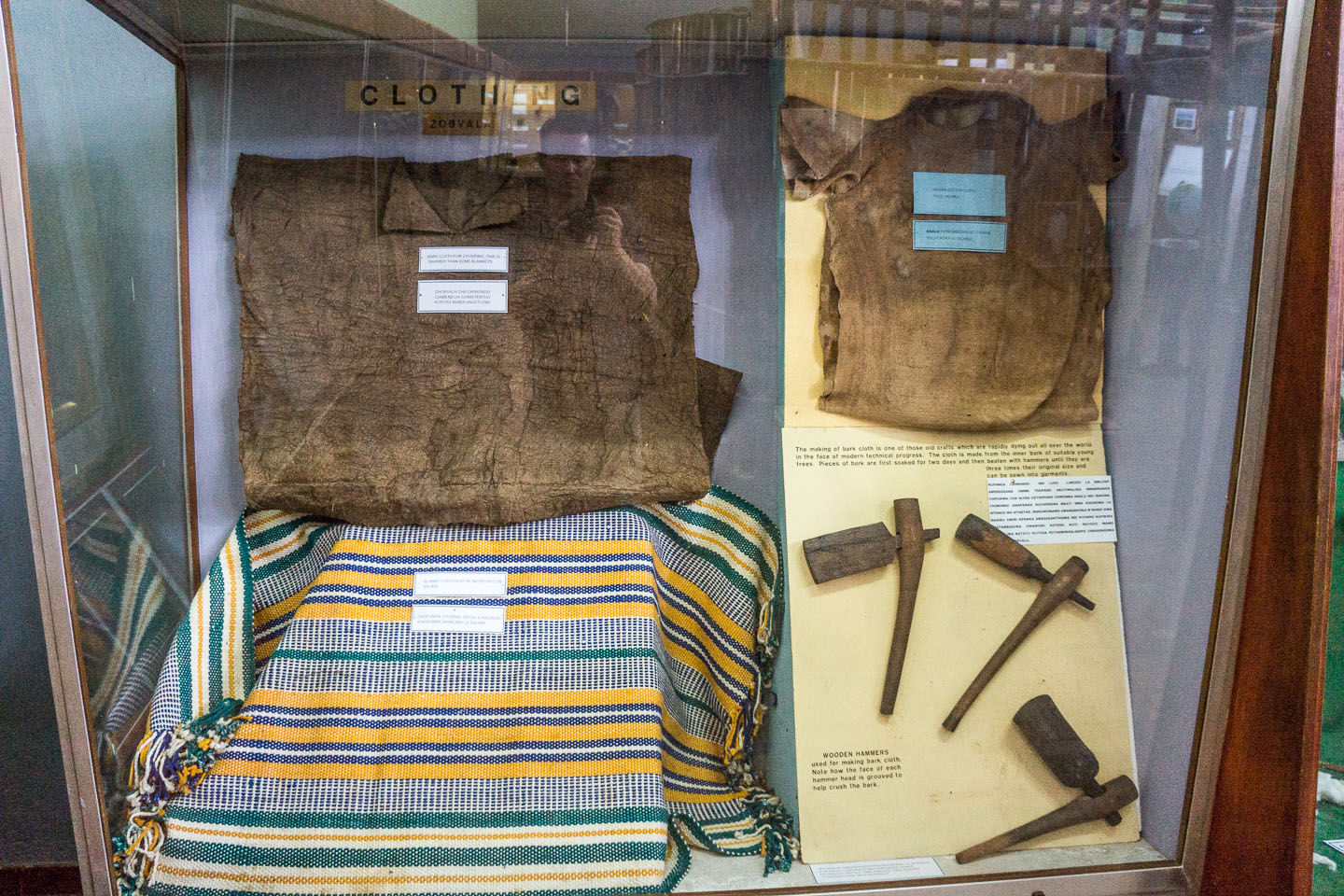
Old clothing exhibit

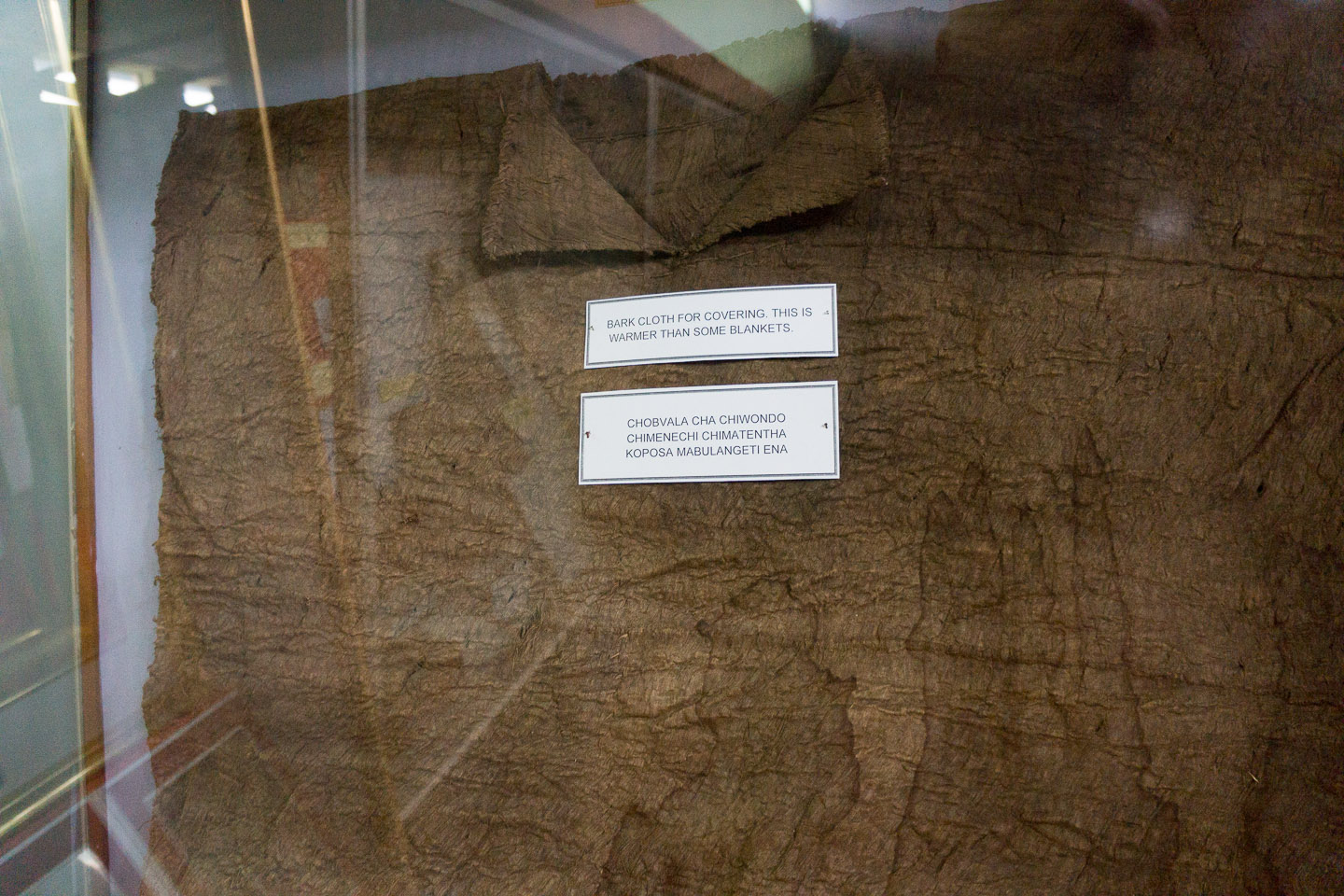
Bark cloth exhibit

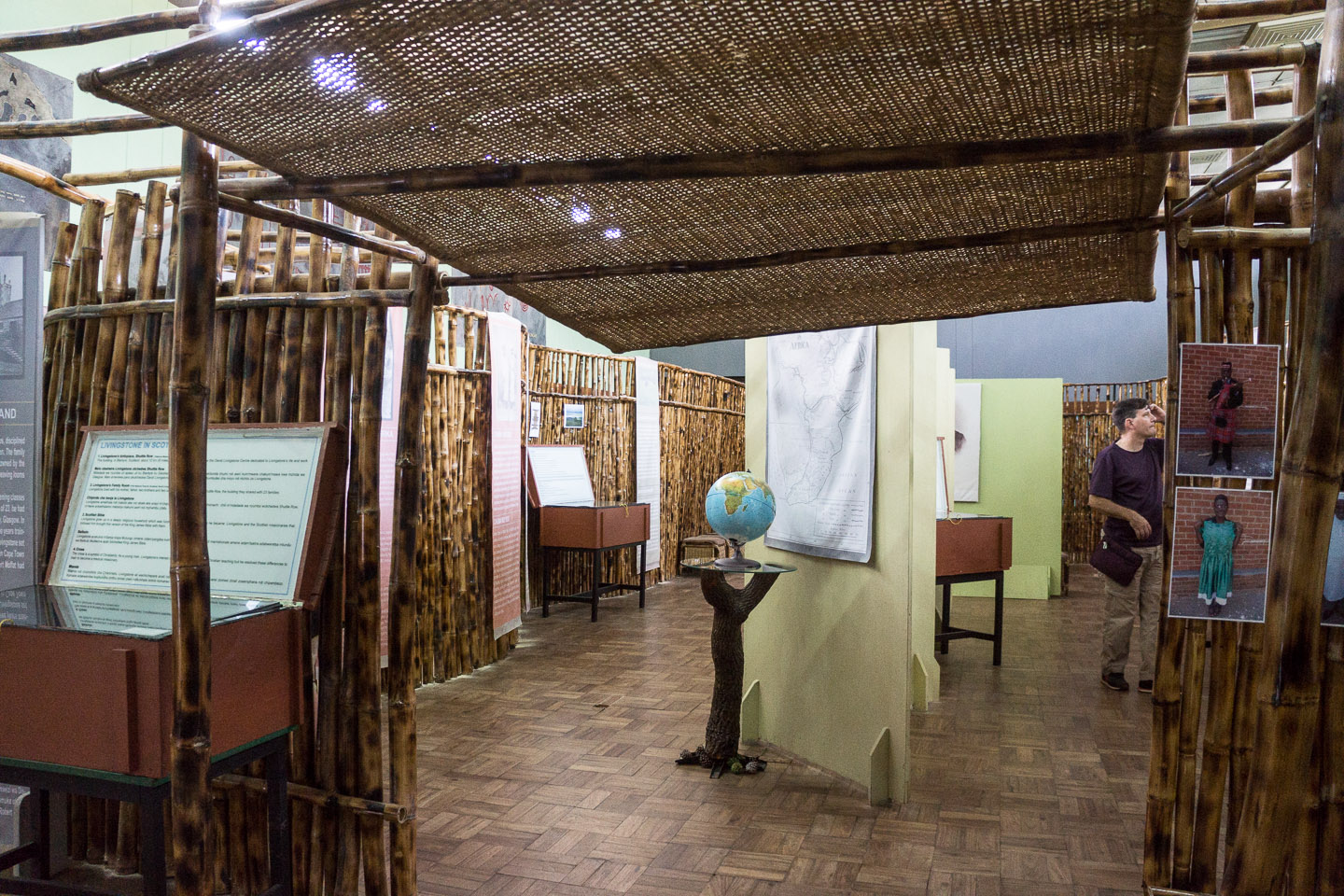
In front of the entrance to the temporary David Livingstone exhibit (2014)

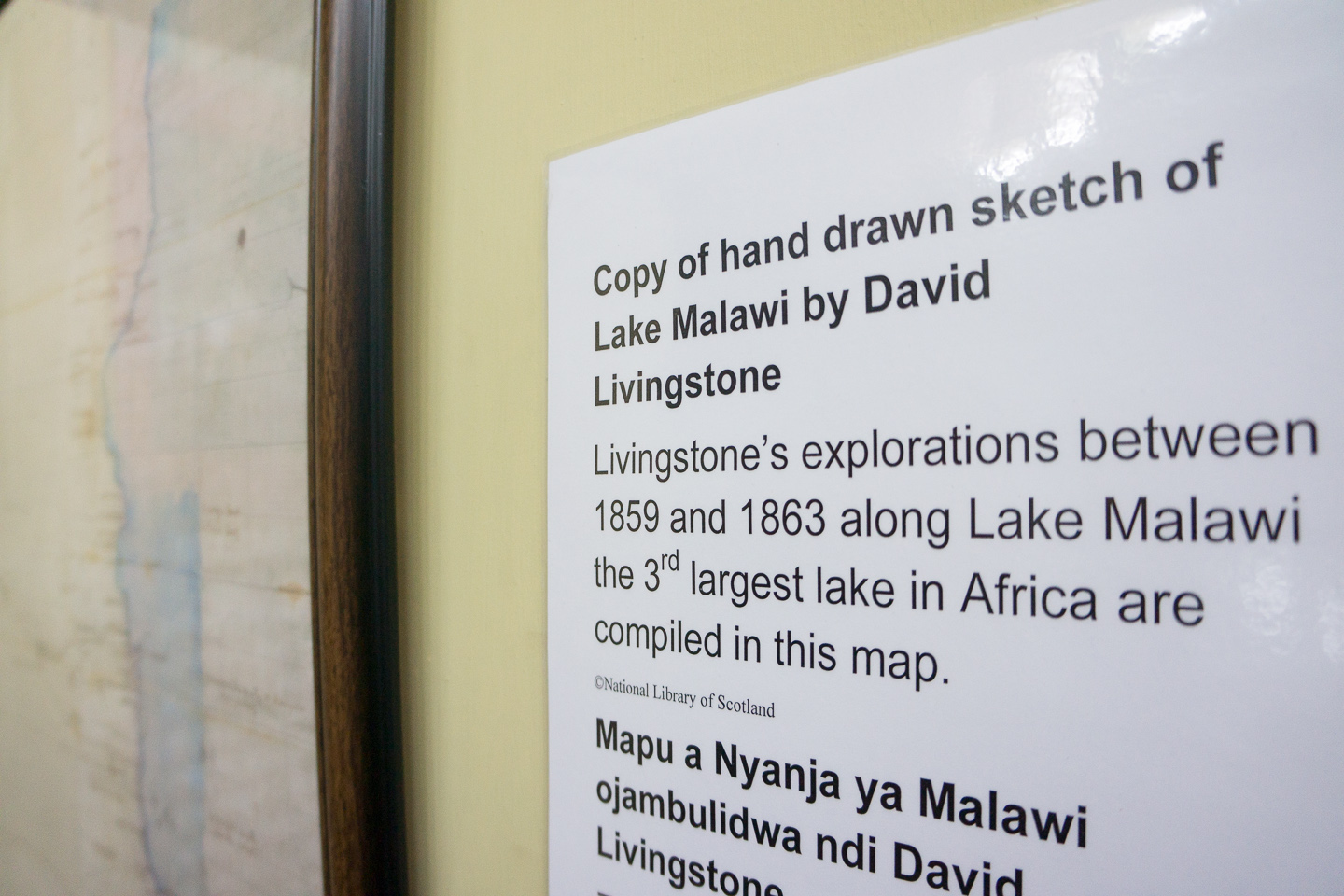
Map of Livingstone's travels at temporary exhibit (2014)
