= Lists of museums =

This is a list of museums, sorted by country, topic and size, respectively.

The total number of museums in the world is disputed. UNESCO claims that there are 95,000 museums today. The International Council of Museums has 57,208 members in 137 countries and territories, as of 2023.

== By country ==
This is a list of museums by country, defined by any country that is a UN observer or member state.

- Afghanistan
- Albania
- Algeria
- Andorra
- Angola
- Antigua and Barbuda
- Argentina
- Armenia
- Australia
- Austria
- Azerbaijan
- Bahamas
- Bahrain
- Bangladesh
- Barbados
- Belarus
- Belgium
- Belize
- Benin
- Bhutan
- Bolivia
- Bosnia and Herzegovina
- Botswana
- Brazil
- Brunei
- Bulgaria
- Burkina Faso
- Burma
- Burundi
- Cambodia
- Cameroon
- Canada
- Cape Verde
- Central African Republic
- Chad
- Chile
- China
- Colombia
- Comoros
- Costa Rica
- Croatia
- Cuba
- Cyprus
- Czech Republic
- Democratic Republic of the Congo
- Denmark
- Djibouti
- Dominica
- Dominican Republic
- Ecuador
- Egypt
- El Salvador
- Equatorial Guinea
- Eritrea
- Estonia
- Ethiopia
- Federated States of Micronesia
- Fiji
- Finland
- France
- Gabon
- The Gambia
- Georgia
- Germany
- Ghana
- Greece
- Greenland
- Guatemala
- Guinea
- Guinea-Bissau
- Guyana
- Haiti
- Honduras
- Hungary
- Iceland
- India
- Indonesia
- Iran
- Iraq
- Ireland
- Israel
- Italy
- Ivory Coast
- Jamaica
- Japan
- Jordan
- Kazakhstan
- Kenya
- Kiribati
- Kuwait
- Kyrgyzstan
- Laos
- Latvia
- Lebanon
- Lesotho
- Liberia
- Libya
- Liechtenstein
- Lithuania
- Luxembourg
- Madagascar
- Malawi
- Malaysia
- Mali
- Malta
- Marshall Islands
- Mauritania
- Mauritius
- Mexico
- Moldova
- Monaco
- Mongolia
- Montenegro
- Morocco
- Mozambique
- Namibia
- Nauru
- Nepal
- Netherlands
- New Zealand
- Nicaragua
- Niger
- Nigeria
- Northern Ireland
- North Korea
- North Macedonia
- Norway
- Oman
- Pakistan
- Palau
- Palestine
- Panama
- Papua New Guinea
- Paraguay
- Peru
- Philippines
- Poland
- Portugal
- Qatar
- Republic of the Congo
- Romania
- Russia
- Rwanda
- Saint Kitts and Nevis
- Samoa
- San Marino
- São Tomé and Príncipe
- Saudi Arabia
- Senegal
- Serbia
- Seychelles
- Sierra Leone
- Singapore
- Slovakia
- Slovenia
- Solomon Islands
- Somalia
- South Africa
- South Korea
- South Sudan
- Spain
- Sri Lanka
- Sudan
- Suriname
- Swaziland
- Sweden
- Switzerland
- Syria
- Taiwan
- Tajikistan
- Tanzania
- Thailand
- Timor-Leste
- Togo
- Tonga
- Trinidad and Tobago
- Tunisia
- Turkey
- Turkmenistan
- Tuvalu
- Uganda
- Ukraine
- United Arab Emirates
- United Kingdom
  - England
  - Northern Ireland
  - Scotland
  - Wales
- United States
- Uruguay
- Uzbekistan
- Vanuatu
- Vatican City
- Venezuela
- Vietnam
- Yemen
- Zambia
- Zimbabwe

== By topic ==
This is a list of museums by the topic that concerns the museum. Museum types that have overlap in one or more categories are listed under the most relevant category.

=== Art ===
- Art museums
  - Ceramics museums
  - Islamic art museums
  - Music museums

=== Design ===
- Design museums
  - Architecture museums

=== Electronics ===
- Computer museums
  - Video game museums

=== Food ===
- Food and beverage museums
  - Chocolate museums
  - Wine museums

=== History and culture ===
- Historical museums
  - Agricultural museums
  - Archaeological museums
    - Numismatic museums
    - Greek and Roman antiquities
  - Biographical museums
  - Ethnographic museums
  - Horological museum
  - Military and war museums
    - Jail and prison museums
  - Natural history museums
    - Medical museums
  - Open-air and living history museums
  - Postal museums
  - Sex museums
  - Textile museums
    - Fashion museums
  - Torture museums
  - Toy museums
  - Transport museums
    - Automobile museums
    - Aviation museums
    - Maritime museums
    - Railway museums

=== Science ===
- Science museums
  - Chemical museums
  - Aerospace museums
- Technology museums

=== Miscellaneous ===
The following museums do not fall under any of the previous categories or can fall under any of them.

- Children's museums
- National museums
- Virtual museums

== By size ==
- List of largest museums
- List of most visited museums
- List of museums with major collections of European prints and drawings

== See also ==
- List of archives
- List of libraries
- List of buildings and structures
- Lists of tourist attractions
- List of World Heritage Sites
