= List of museums in Turkmenistan =

This is a list of museums in Turkmenistan.

== Ashgabat ==
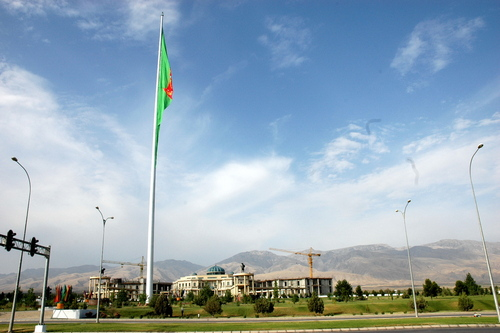
The State Museum of the State Cultural Center of Turkmenistan

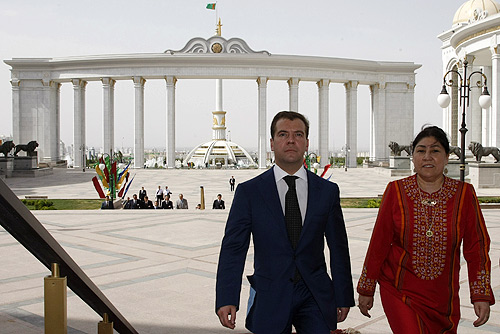
Russian President Dmitry Medvedev visits Museum of the First President of Turkmenistan

- Main building of the State Museum of the State Cultural Center of Turkmenistan
  - Museum of the President of Turkmenistan
  - Museum of Ethnography and Local History of Turkmenistan
- Turkmen Carpet Museum
- Turkmen Museum of Fine Arts
- Museum of the Academy of Arts of Turkmenistan
- Museum of the First President of Turkmenistan
- Watan Mukaddesligi Museum at Halk Hakydasy Memorial Complex
- Museum of Neutrality of Turkmenistan at Neutrality Monument
- Museum of Independence of Turkmenistan at Independence Monument
- Museum of the Constitution of Turkmenistan at Monument to the Constitution

== Annau ==
- Wheat museum (Ak Bugday National Museum )

== Mary ==
- Museum of Local Lore of Mary Region

== Türkmenabat ==
- Museum of History and Local Lore of Lebap Region

== Balkanabat ==
- Museum of History and Local Lore of the Balkan Region

== Dashoguz ==
- Museum of History and Local Lore of the Dashoguz Region

== Turkmenbashi ==
- Museum of Local Lore of Turkmenbashi city
- Avaza Ship World Museum

== See also ==
- List of museums
