= Nebojsa Dimovski =

Bosnian artist

Nebojša Dimovski
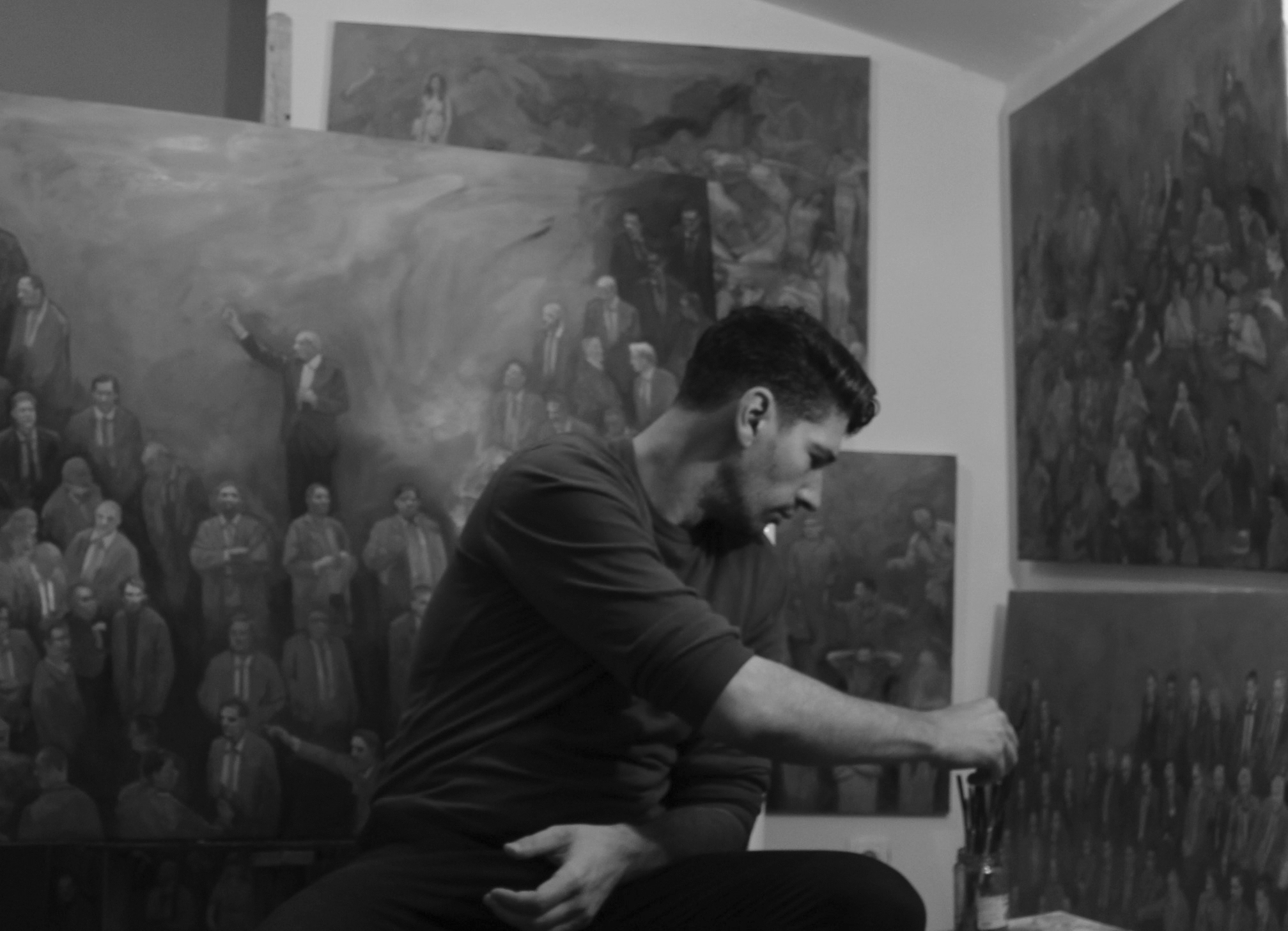
- Nebojša Dimovski
- Known for: Painting
- Movement: Contemporary art

Nebojša Dimovski is a Bosnian artist known for his figurative paintings.

== Career ==
Dimovski relocated to Spain in 2013, primarily living and working in Madrid. He was a finalist at the 83rd Salon de Otoño (2016), the oldest art competition in Spain, held under the patronage of the royal family. In 2014, he won first prize at the international competition Valencia Cuna del Arte. His work has been exhibited in Italy, Spain, the Netherlands, Hungary, Bosnia and Herzegovina, Croatia, and the United States. In 2021, he participated in the Venice International Art Fair, presenting a series inspired by Dante Alighieri's Divine Comedy.

== Major exhibitions ==
- 2010 – Finalist, Premio Nazionale delle Arti, Naples, Italy
- 2013 – Embassy of the United States, Sarajevo, Bosnia and Herzegovina (private showing)
- 2014 – Winner, Valencia Cuna del Arte, Valencia, Spain
- 2016 – Finalist, 83rd Salon de Otoño, Casa de Vacas, Madrid, Spain
- 2020 – Solo exhibition Red, Queen Katarina Kosača Art Gallery, Mostar, Bosnia and Herzegovina
- 2021 – Venice International Art Fair, Palazzo Albrizzi-Capello, Venice, Italy
- 2023 – Solo exhibition Mothers, National Gallery of Bosnia and Herzegovina, Sarajevo, Bosnia and Herzegovina
- 2024 – Conceptual exhibition War Absurd, House of Mujaga Komadina, Mostar, Bosnia and Herzegovina
- 2024 – Guest artist, La Bottega Gallery, Laguna Beach, California, United States

== Thematic work ==
In 2020, Dimovski held his first solo exhibition in Bosnia and Herzegovina, titled "Red" (Crvena), featuring 24 works painted during the COVID-19 pandemic. The series explores themes of isolation, nostalgia, and interpersonal connection, often portraying figures from the artist's personal life.

In 2023, he presented "Mothers" (Majke) in dedicated to maternal figures and the theme of female strength in times of societal instability. Critics praised the emotional depth and simplicity of the compositions.

In 2024, he presented "Absurdity of War" in the ruins of a historical building in Mostar, staged symbolically to emphasize its anti-war message.

== Other projects ==
In 2021, Dimovski created a new altar painting of Saint Nicholas Tavelic for the church in Lišane Ostrovičke, Croatia, as a symbolic restoration of a World War II–destroyed artwork.
