= List of museums in Guyana =

This is a list of museums in Guyana.

| Title | Address |
| Guyana National Museum | Company Path (opposite the Hibiscus Plaza and the Guyana Post Office, Georgetown |
| Walter Roth Museum of Anthropology | 61 Main Street, North Cummings burg, Georgetown |
| Castellani House / National Gallery of Art | Vlissengen Road & Homestretch Avenue, Georgetown |
| The Museum of African Heritage | 13 Barima Avenue, Bel Air Park, Georgetown |
| John Campbell Police Museum | Headquarters of Guyana Police, Eve Leary Compound, Georgetown |
| The Rupununi Weavers Society Museum at Lethem | Lethem |
| The Guyana Heritage Museum | 17 Kastev, Met-en-Meerzorg |
| The Philatelic Museum | Robb and Savage Streets, Robbstown, Georgetown |
| Dutch Heritage Museum | Court of Policy building, Fort Island |
| Buxton/Friendship Museum Archive & Culture Center (BFMACC) | 35 Edmond Forde Street, Buxton, East Coast Demerara, Guyana |

== See also ==
- List of museums by country
- Education in Guyana
- Culture of Guyana
