= List of national galleries =

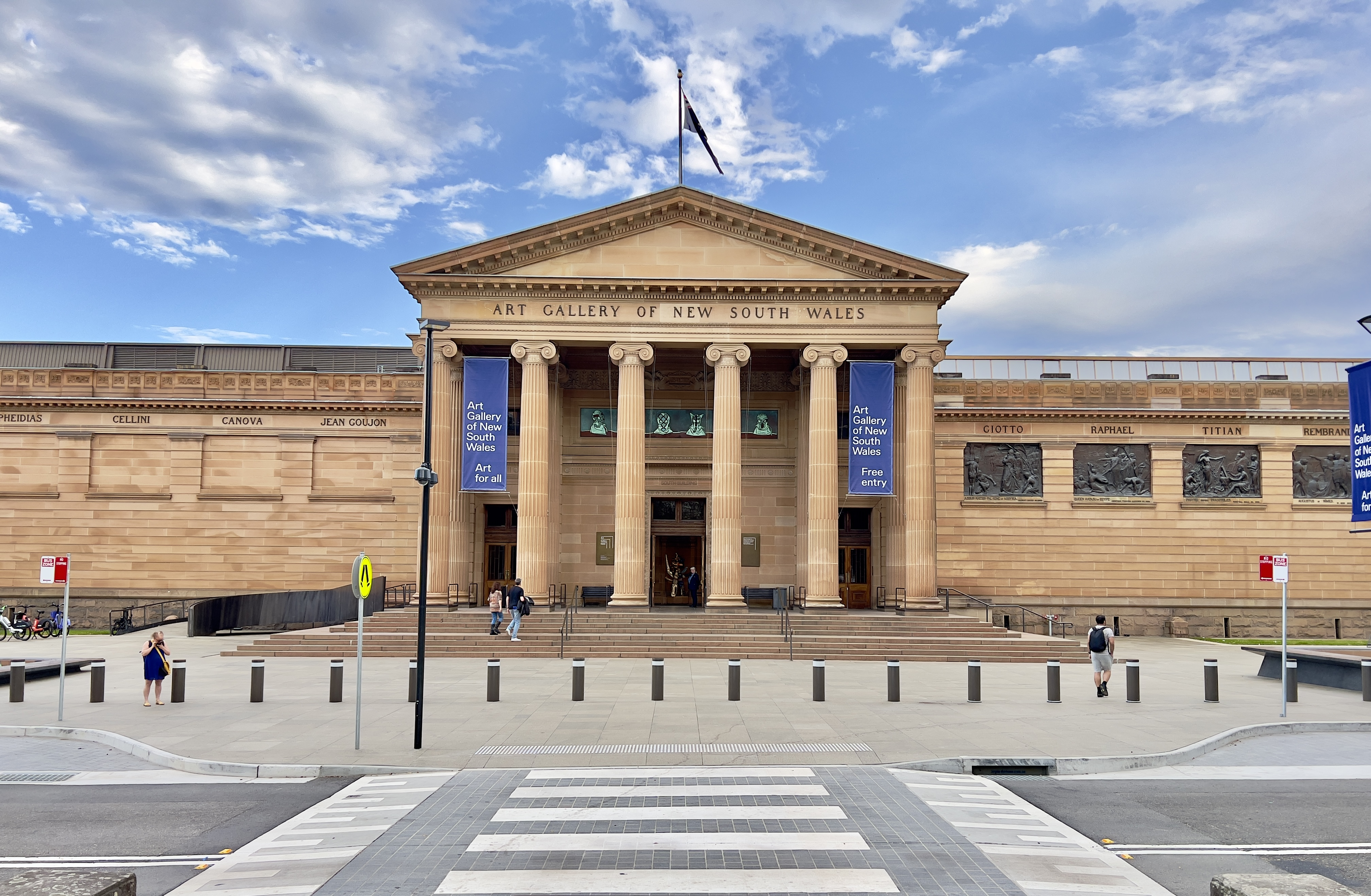
The Art Gallery of New South Wales in Sydney, Australia

The following is an incomplete list of national galleries:

== Africa ==
- Iziko South African National Gallery, Cape Town, South Africa
- National Art Gallery of Namibia, Windhoek, Namibia

== The Americas ==
- Galería Nacional, San Juan, Puerto Rico
- Musée national des beaux-arts du Québec, Quebec City, Canada
- National Art Gallery of The Bahamas, Nassau, Bahamas
- National Gallery of Canada (Musée des beaux-arts du Canada), Ottawa, Canada
- National Gallery of Art, Tegucigalpa, Honduras
- National Gallery of Art, Washington, DC, U.S.
- National Art Gallery (Caracas) Caracas, Venezuela
- National Gallery of Jamaica Kingston, Jamaica
- Museu Nacional de Belas Artes Rio de Janeiro, Brazil
- Salvadoran Museum of Art, San Salvador, El Salvador

== Asia ==
- National Art Gallery (Bangladesh), Dhaka, Bangladesh
- National Gallery of Modern Art, New Delhi, India
- National Gallery of Indonesia, Jakarta, Indonesia
- Jordan National Gallery of Fine Arts, Amman, Jordan
- National Visual Arts Gallery (Malaysia), Kuala Lumpur, Malaysia
- National Art Gallery, Pakistan, Islamabad, Pakistan
- National Museum of Fine Arts (Manila), also known as National Art Gallery, Philippines
- National Gallery Singapore, Singapore
- National Gallery (Thailand), Bangkok, Thailand

== Europe ==
=== Italy ===
- Galleria Nazionale (Parma)
- Galleria Nazionale d'Arte Antica, Rome
- Galleria Nazionale d'Arte Moderna, Rome
- Galleria Nazionale delle Marche, Urbino
- Galleria Nazionale dell'Umbria, Perugia
- Pinacoteca Nazionale di Bologna
- Pinacoteca Nazionale in Ferrara
- Pinacoteca Nazionale (Siena)

=== United Kingdom ===
- National Gallery, London
- Scottish National Gallery, Edinburgh
- National Museum Cardiff (formerly the National Museum and Gallery of Wales), Cardiff
- National Gallery, British Art (and other variants thereon), a former name of Tate Britain, London

=== Other European countries ===
- National Art Gallery of Albania (Galeria Kombëtare e Arteve), Tirana, Albania
- National Gallery of Armenia, Yerevan, Armenia
- National Gallery of Bosnia and Herzegovina, Sarajevo, Bosnia and Herzegovina
- National Art Gallery (Bulgaria) (Национална художествена галерия), Sofia, Bulgaria
- Museu Nacional d'Art de Catalunya, Barcelona, Catalonia, Spain
- National Gallery in Prague (Národní galerie v Praze), Czech Republic
- Statens Museum for Kunst, Copenhagen, Denmark
- Finnish National Gallery (Suomen Kansallisgalleria / Finlands Nationalgalleri), Helsinki, Finland
  - Ateneum art museum, and
  - Kiasma, the museum of contemporary art
  - Sinebrychoff Art Museum
- National Gallery (Berlin), Germany, two of whose components are:
  - Alte Nationalgalerie (Old National Gallery), Berlin
  - Neue Nationalgalerie (New National Gallery), Berlin
- National Gallery (Athens), Greece (alternatively, the National Art Gallery and Alexandros Soutzos Museum)
- National Museum of Contemporary Art, Athens, Greece
- Hungarian National Gallery, Budapest, Hungary
- National Gallery of Iceland (Listasafn Íslands), Reykjavik, Iceland
- National Gallery of Ireland, Dublin, Ireland
- Latvian National Museum of Art, Riga, Latvia
- Kunstmuseum Liechtenstein, Vaduz, Liechtenstein
- National Gallery of Art (Vilnius), Lithuania
- National Gallery (North Macedonia), Skopje, North Macedonia
- National Museum of Art, Architecture and Design (Nasjonalmuseet for kunst, arkitektur og design), Oslo, Norway
- National Museum of Art of Romania, Bucharest, Romania
- National Museum of Contemporary Art (Romania), Bucharest, Romania
- Slovak National Gallery (Slovenská Národná Galéria), Bratislava, Slovakia
- National Gallery of Slovenia (Narodna Galerija), Ljubljana, Slovenia
- Nationalmuseum, Stockholm, Sweden
- Zachęta National Gallery of Art, Warsaw, Poland

== Oceania ==
- National Gallery of Australia, Canberra, Australia
- National Gallery of Victoria, Melbourne, Australia
- National Art Gallery of New South Wales (now known as Art Gallery of New South Wales)
- National Art Gallery of New Zealand, Wellington, New Zealand (now defunct)

== See also ==
- Museum of Fine Arts (disambiguation)
- National archive
- National library
- National museum
- National Portrait Gallery (disambiguation)
