= List of museums in the Federated States of Micronesia =

This article lists the museums in the Federated States of Micronesia:

== Chuuk ==
- Kimiuo Aisek Memorial Museum

== Kosrae ==
- Kosrae State Museum

== Pohnpei ==
- Lidorkini Museum in Kolonia, closed c. 2012.

== Yap ==
- Yap Living History Museum, living museum of ethnography, co-financed by France in the town centre in Colonia.
