= List of museums in Togo =

This is a list of museums in Togo.

== List ==
- La Ville Mon Musée
- Musée Agbedigo Gaston
- Musée Geologique National
- Musée National du Togo
- Musée Régional d'Aného
- Musée Régional de Kara
- Musée Régional des Savanes
- Musée Régional du Centre, Sokode

== See also ==
- List of museums
