= Zinder Regional Museum =

Regional museum in Zinder, Niger

- Musée régional de Zinder
- Established: 1987
- Location: Zinder, Niger
- Type: Regional museum

The Zinder Regional Museum (Musée régional de Zinder in french) is a museum in Zinder, Niger.

Established in 1987, it preserves and presents objects relating to the historical and cultural heritage of the Zinder Region, particularly the history of the Sultanate of Damagaram.

== History ==
The museum was established in 1987.

Its collections document aspects of the historical and cultural heritage of the Zinder Region, whose history is closely associated with the Sultanate of Damagaram.

== Description ==
=== Location and organisation ===
Mahamane Sani Abdou has served as director of the museum.

The museum is involved in the preservation and promotion of the heritage of Birni, the historic quarter of Zinder and former fortified capital of the sultanate.

Heritage sites in the area include the Sultan's Palace and remains of the fortified enclosure known as the Gârou. As part of efforts to nominate the old city of Zinder for inclusion on the UNESCO World Heritage List, the management committee for the Birni site has been jointly supervised by the mayor of Zinder and the director of the regional museum.

=== Purpose ===
The museum preserves objects relating to the cultural and historical heritage of Zinder and the surrounding region.

=== Collections ===
The museum's holdings include musical instruments and ceremonial masks. Its collections include traditional musical instruments and ceremonial masks.

== See also ==
=== Related articles ===
- Culture of Niger
- List of museums in Niger
- Sultanate of Damagaram
