= List of museums in Somalia =

This is a list of museums in Somalia.

== Museums ==
- National Museum of Somalia
- Saryan Museum

== See also ==
- List of museums
- List of museums in Somaliland

== See also ==
- McMahon, Kathryn (1988). "The Hargeisa Provincial Museum". African Arts. 21 (3): 64–68, 87–88. doi:10.2307/3336446. JSTOR 3336446.
- Crespo-Toral, H. (1988). "Museum development and monuments conservation: Somalia" (PDF). UNESCO.
- Lengyel, Oguz Janos (1982). "National Museum of Somalia, Mogadiscio: Roof Restoration Project" (PDF). UNESCO.
