= List of museums in Benin =

This is a list of museums in Benin.

== Museums in Benin ==
- Alexandre Sènou Adandé Ethnographic Museum
- Musée da Silva des Arts et de la Culture
- Musee Histsorique d’ Abomey
- Musée en Plein Air de Parakou
- Ouidah Museum of History
- Royal Palace Museum (Porto-Novo)

== See also ==
- List of museums
