= National Art Gallery, Pakistan =

National Art Gallery
- نگارخانه قومی فن
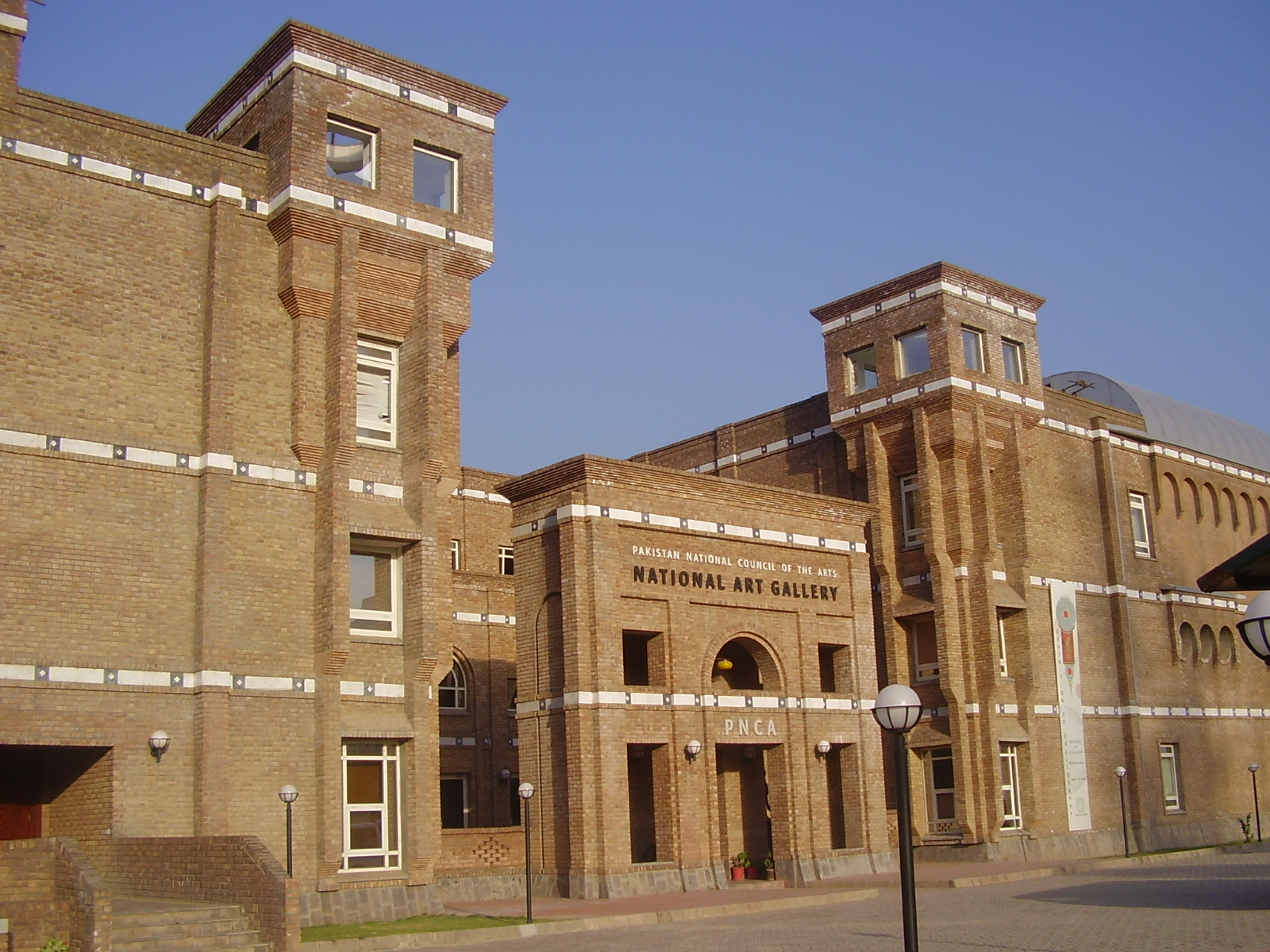
- National Art Gallery, Islamabad
- Established: 26 August 2007
- Location: Islamabad, Pakistan
- Coordinates: 33.7305°N 73.0910°E
- Type: art gallery

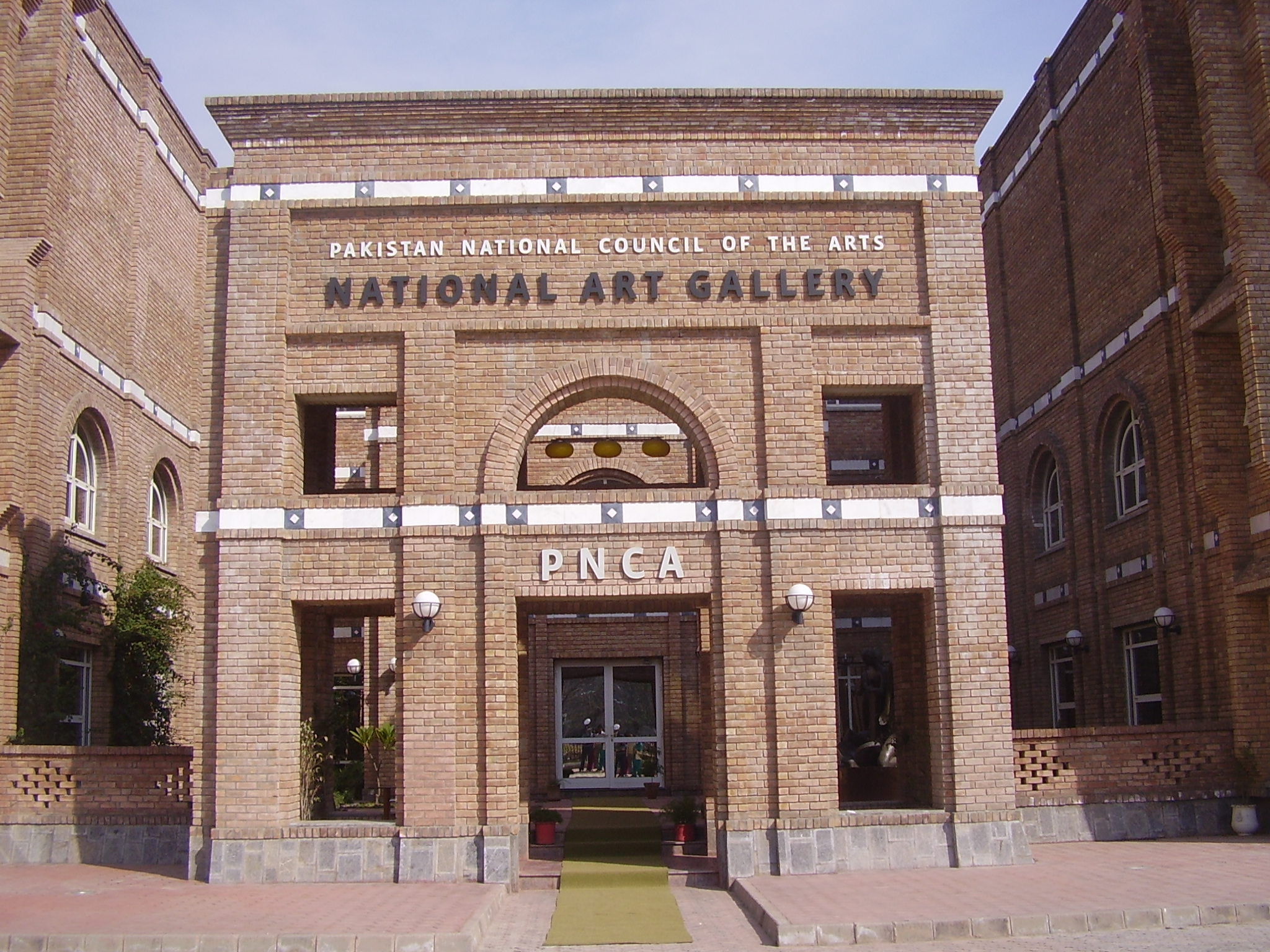
Main Entrance

National Art Gallery in Islamabad, Pakistan is the country's first national art gallery. Built on a small hillock opposite the Majlis-e-Shoora (the Parliament of Pakistan) and the Aiwan-e-Sadr (the President's House). It opened to the public on Sunday, August 26, 2007. National Art Gallery, Pakistan is a part of the larger organization called Pakistan National Council of the Arts.

In 2007, Director General of PNCA was Naeem Tahir.

In 2017, Director General of Pakistan National Council of Arts (PNCA) was Jamal Shah.

== Design ==
In a nationwide design contest in 1989, the design of Suhail Abbasi & Naeem Pasha of M/s Suhail & Pasha, Architects & Planning Consultants Islamabad was selected for the construction of the National Art Gallery. Their modernistic brick cube is a model of Miesian purity and functionality.

The gallery, with a covered area of 1,505 m^{2} (16,200 sq ft) , has 14 galleries with adjacent display areas, lecture halls, workshop and storage facilities, laboratories and a library. The four-storey gallery has modern facilities, including an auditorium with capacity for 400, a theatre, stage facilities and an open-air theatre.

== Folk artistes train tours to entertain public ==
In 2017, Pakistan National Council of the Arts (PNCA) arranged a special train tour for a 36-member troupe of folk artistes aboard the Pakistan Railways Special Azadi Train-2017 to make stops at different railway stations across Pakistan to entertain the public. This special train, with five art galleries and six floats, was specially prepared at the Pakistan Railways Carriage Factory. It was set to start its journey a couple of days before 14 August 2017, which was the independence day of Pakistan.

== See also ==
- List of national galleries
