= National Museum of Gitega =

Museum in Gitega

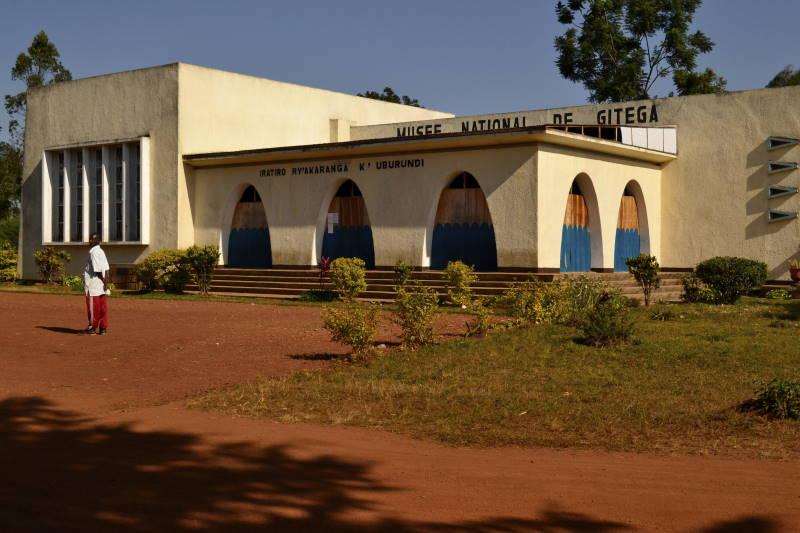
- The exterior of the museum, pictured in 2013
- Established: 1955
- Location: Place de la Révolution 223; Gitega, Gitega Province, Burundi
- Coordinates: 3.418236°S 29.908485°E
- Type: national museum

The National Museum of Gitega (French: Musée National de Gitega, Kirundi: Iratiro ry'akaranga k'Uburundi) is the national museum of Burundi. It is located in Gitega and was founded under Belgian colonial rule in 1955. The museum is the largest of Burundi's public museums although its collection is displayed in a single room. In 2014 it averaged 20–50 visitors per week.

Founded in 1955, the museum was intended to preserve artefacts from Burundian folk culture which were declining as a result of modernisation and social change. Its collection includes ethnographic and historical objects originating in the country, including artefacts from the court of the Burundian monarchs. The lack of funds has meant that the museum has made few recent acquisitions.

In 2015, a catalogue of the museum's collection was published with the support of the German Embassy in Burundi entitled Le Patrimoine Burundais: le Musée de Gitega.
