= List of museums in Mozambique =

This is a list of museums in Mozambique.

== List ==
- Eduardo Mondlane University Museum of Natural History
- Museu da Revolução
- Museu de História Natural (Mozambique)
- Museu Nacional da Moeda (Mozambique)
- Museu Nacional de Arte (Mozambique)
- Museu Nacional de Etnologia (Mozambique)
- Museu Nacional de Geologia (Mozambique)
- Museu Regional de Inhambane
- Museus da Ilha de Moçambique

== See also ==
- List of museums
