= List of museums in Malawi =

This is a list of museums in Malawi.

== List ==
- Chamare Museum & Research Centre
- Chichiri Museum
- Cultural & Museum Centre Karonga
- Lake Malawi Museum
- Kungoni
- Mtengatenga Postal Hut Museum
- Mtengatenga Museum
- Mzuzu Regional Museum
- Mandala House
- Stone House
- Transport Museum (Limbe)
- William Murray Museum

== See also ==
- List of museums
