= List of museums in the Central African Republic =

This is a list of museums in the Central African Republic.

== List ==
- Musée Barthélémy Boganda
- Musée de Bouar
- Musée Labasso

== See also ==
- List of museums
