= Living Museum of Bujumbura =

Zoo and museum in Bujumbura, Burundi

Coordinates: 3.387425°S 29.353656°E

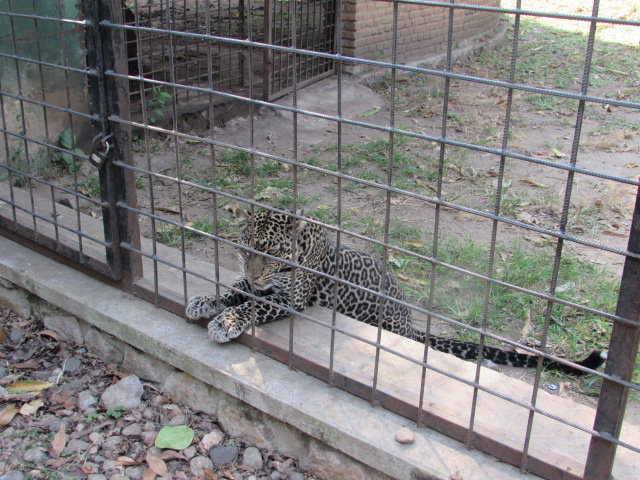
- A leopard in the Musée Vivant
- Established: 1977
- Location: Bujumbura, Burundi
- Type: Art museum, zoo

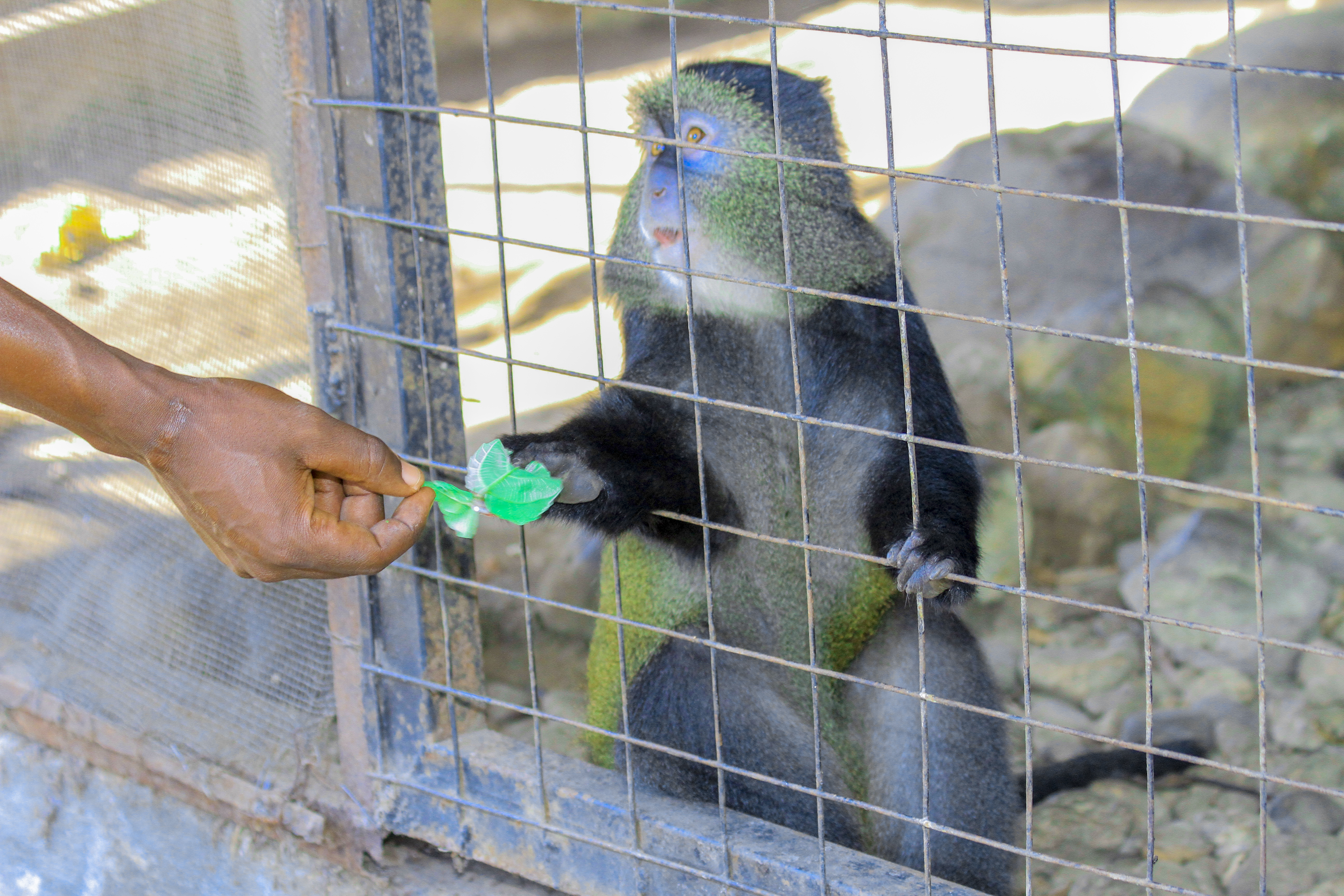
A monkey in the Musée Vivant

The Living Museum of Bujumbura (French: Musée Vivant de Bujumbura) is a zoo and museum in Burundi. The museum is located in Bujumbura, the country's largest city and former capital, and is one of the country's two public museums. It is dedicated to the wildlife and art of Burundi.

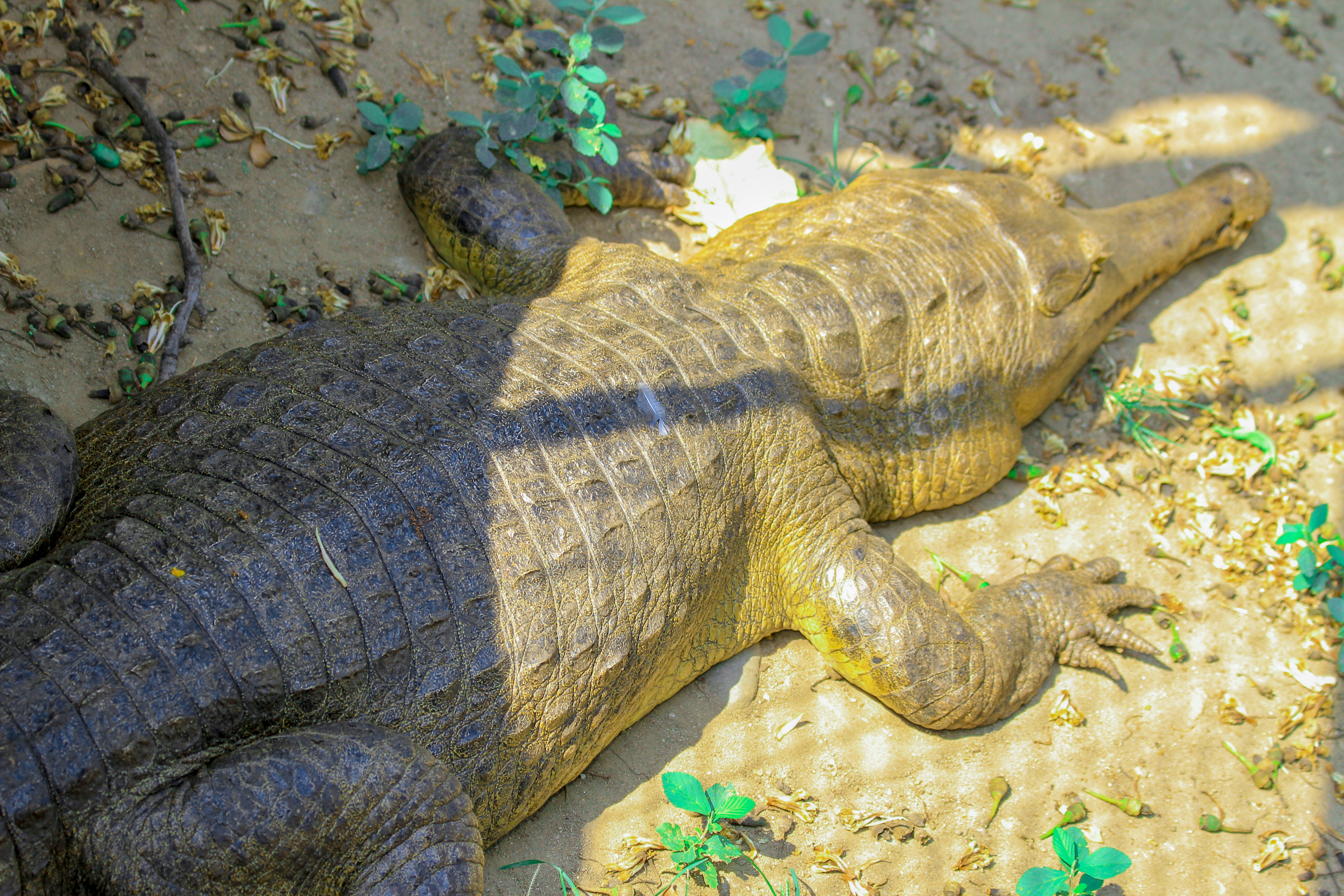
A crocodile in the Musée Vivant

The museum was founded in 1977 and occupies a 3 hectares (7.4 acres) park on the rue du 13 Octobre in downtown Bujumbura. In December 2016, the zoo's collection included six crocodiles, one monkey, one leopard, two chimpanzees, three guinea fowls, a tortoise, an antelope, and a number of snakes and fish. A number of Burundian craftsmen also have workshops on the museum's premises. Several different types of trees stand in the park, alongside a reconstruction of a traditional Burundian house (rugo).

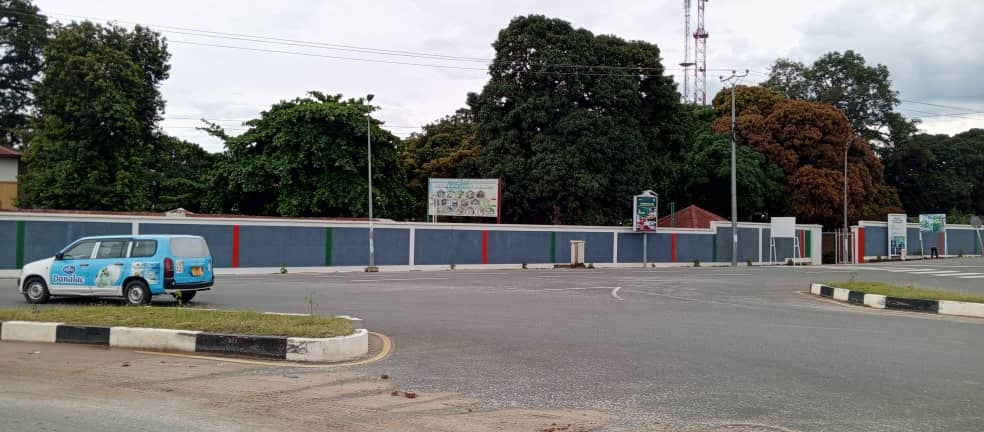
Outside of the Musée Vivant

The number of visitors to the museum fell sharply in the aftermath of the 2015 Burundian unrest, following a wider decline in the number of tourists to the country.
