= List of museums in Madagascar =

This is a list of museums in Madagascar.

== List ==
- Ambatolampy
  - Butterfly museum (Madagascar) (Le Musée des Papillons)
- Antananarivo
  - Andafiavaratra Palace Museum
  - Immaculate Conception Cathedral, Antananarivo Museum
  - Museum of Ethnology and Paleontology
  - Museum of Art and Archaeology
  - National Museum of Geology
  - Private Pirate’s Museum
  - Vazimba Museum of the commune of Alasora
  - Private Museum of Lohavohitra
  - Museum of Photography of Madagascar
  - Museum of the Armed Forces (Musée des Forces Armées)
  - Museum Rainilaiarivony in Amboditsiry, Antananarivo.
- Antsirabe
  - Akamia Museum
- Fandriana (Amoron'i Mania)
  - Rafiliposaona Museum
- Fenoarivo Atsinanana
  - LAMPY Museum of the commune of Fenoarivo Atsinanana
- Fianarantsoa
  - Musée Faniahy of the University of Fianarantsoa
  - Floating Museum of the Canal des Pangalanes
- Mahajanga
  - Mozea Akiba of the University of Mahajanga
- Mandritsara
  - Androna museum, of the University of Mahajanga in Mandritsara
- Moramanga
  - Musée National de la Gendarmerie
  - Andasibe Museum
- Nosy Be
  - Oceanographic Research Museum (CNRO)
- Nosy Boraha
  - Ilot Madame Museum
- Toamasina
  - CEREL Museum of the University of Toamasina
  - Museum of the Port of Toamasina
- Tolanaro
  - Anosy museum and Flacourt fortress
  - Private Museum Arembelo Androy Berenty
  - Andohahela Museum
- Toliara
  - CEDRATOM Museum of the University of Toliara
  - Rabesandratana Museum - an oceanographic & marine museum

== See also ==
- List of museums
