= List of museums in Paraguay =

This is a list of museums in Paraguay.

- National Museum of Natural History of Paraguay (MNHNP)
- Casa de la Independencia Museum
- Botanical Garden and Zoo of Asunción (Municipal museum of natural history and indigenous culture)
- Museo Nacional de Bellas Artes de Asunción
- Mythical Museum Ramón Elías
- Gaspar Rodríguez de Francia Museum
- Museo Militar (Asunción, Paraguay)
- Museo Memoria de la Ciudad
- Museo del Barro
- Museo de Arte Sacro de la Fundación Nicolás Darío Latourrette Bo
- Museo Etnográfico Doctor Andrés Barbero
- Museo Mitológico Ramón Elías
- Museo San Rafael (Itaguá, Paraguay)

== See also ==
- List of museums by country
