= List of museums in Burundi =

This is a list of museums in Burundi.

== List ==
Name	Original name	Location	Foundation	Subject
National Museum of Gitega	Musée National de Gitega	Gitega	1955	History and ethnography
Living Museum of Bujumbura	Musée Vivant de Bujumbura	Bujumbura	1977	Wildlife, nature and culture
Geological Museum of Burundi	Musée de Geologie du Burundi	Bujumbura		Geology

== See also ==
- List of museums
