= List of museums in Vanuatu =

This is a list of museums in Vanuatu.

== Museums in Vanuatu ==
- National Museum of Vanuatu
- Vanuatu Cultural Centre

== See also ==
- List of museums
