= List of museums in Kyrgyzstan =

This is a list of museums in Kyrgyzstan.

== Museums in Kyrgyzstan ==
- Burana Tower
- Kyrgyz State Historical Museum
- M. V. Frunze Museum
- Manas Ordo
- National Historical and Archaeological Museum Complex Sulayman

== See also ==
- List of museums
