= List of museums in Uzbekistan =

This is a list of museums in Uzbekistan.

== Museums in Uzbekistan ==
- Amir Timur Museum
- Afrasiab Museum of Samarkand
- Bukhara State Architectural Art Museum-Preserve
- Nukus Museum of Art
- Ulugh Beg Observatory
- State Museum of History of Uzbekistan
- Museum of Arts of Uzbekistan
- The Museum of Communication History in Uzbekistan
- Shahrisabz Museum of History and Material Culture

== See also ==
- List of museums
- List of archives in Uzbekistan
- List of libraries in Uzbekistan
