= List of museums in the Bahamas =

This is a list of museums in the Bahamas.

== New Providence ==
- Bahamas Historical Society Museum
- National Art Gallery of The Bahamas
- Nassau Public Library and Museum
- San Damon Museum
- Pompey Museum of Slavery & Emancipation
- Balcony House Museum
- Fort Charlotte
- Heritage Museum of the Bahamas
- Junkanoo World Museum & Arts Centre
- Pirates of Nassau
- ECCHO museum (The Current)

== Out Islands ==
- Bimini Museum
- Dolphin House Museum
- Long Island Museum
- Man-O-War Heritage Museum
- Spanish Wells Museum
- Wyannie Malone Museum

== See also ==
- List of museums by country
