= List of museums in South Sudan =

Below is a list of museums in South Sudan.

== List ==
- South Sudan National Museum
- Remembering the Ones We Lost Museum

== See also ==
- List of museums
- List of museums in Sudan
