= List of museums in Namibia =

This is a list of museums in Namibia. The umbrella organisation for all Namibian museums is the Museums Association of Namibia (MAN).

== List ==
- Alte Feste
- Duwisib Castle Museum
- Geological Survey Museum at the Ministry of Mines, Energy and Industry, Windhoek
- Keetmanshoop Museum
- Kolmanskop Museum
- Independence Memorial Museum
- National Museum of Namibia
- Nakambale Museum, named after the nickname of Martti Rautanen, Oniipa
- Okahandja Military Museum
- Ombalantu baobab tree
- Onandjokwe Medical Museum, part of Onandjokwe State Hospital, Oniipa. The first of its kind in Namibia, established in 2013.
- Outjo Museum
- Swakopmund Museum, founded in 1951 and privately administered by the Scientific Society Swakopmund
- Trans-Namib Railroad Museum
- Tsumeb Museum

== See also ==
- Lists of museums
