= Chad National Museum =

National Museum in Chad

- Musée National du Tchad
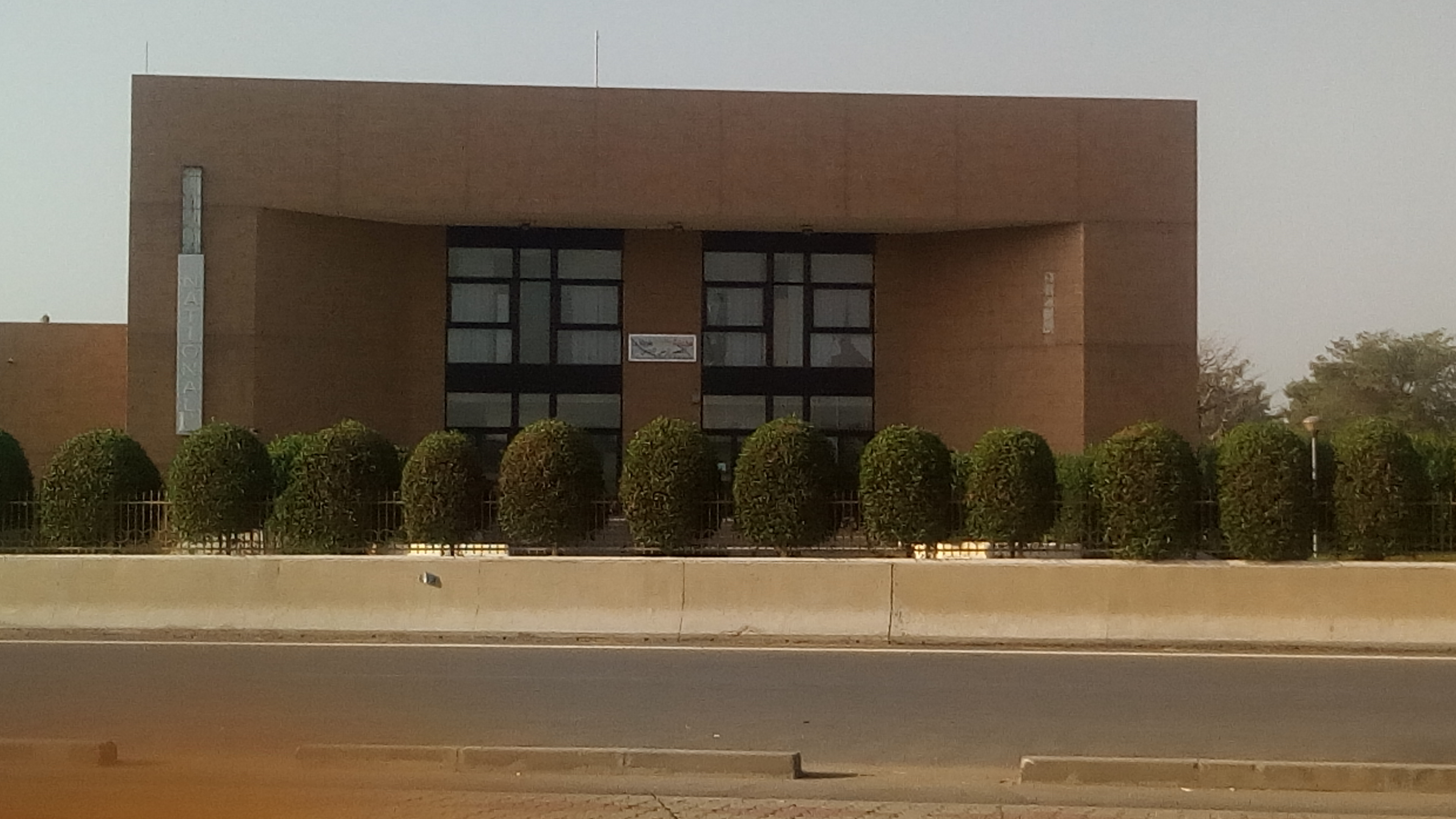

- Chad
- Established: October 6, 1962
- Location: N'Djamena, Chad
- Coordinates: 12.125454°N 15.077433°E
- Type: National museum

The Chad National Museum (French: Musée National du Tchad) is the national museum of Chad located in N'Djamena. It houses numerous objects that trace the history and culture of Chad, including a skull of Toumai man, regarded by Chadians as the world's earliest human ancestor.

== History ==
The museum was established on 6 October 1962 in temporary quarters under the name of Chadian National Museum, Fort-Lamy, reflecting the earlier, colonial name of Chad's capital. In 1964, it moved to the former town hall, near the Place de l'Indépendance.

At the time of the Chadian National Museum's establishment, it had four rooms for palaeontology, prehistory, protohistory, archives, folk arts, crafts and traditions.

Many of its artifacts have were lost and looted during the unrest of the Chadian–Libyan War between 1978 and 1987, with a notable collection of musical instruments among the looted artefacts.

Initiated in 1996 under the aegis of the National Research Support Center (current CNRD), a paleontology room was opened there in 1999 in connection with the prestigious discoveries of fossils made in the Djurab Desert.

In November 2010, the museum moved to a modern building opposite the Palace of January 15, National Assembly, and next to an identical building housing the National Library.

== Description ==
The museum mainly brings together collections relating to popular arts and traditions, archaeology, history, paleontology and Islamic heritage. Many windows are dedicated to the culture of the Sao. A room dedicated to paleoanthropology allows you to observe casts of Tchadanthropus uxoris, d'Abel (Australopithecus bahrelghazali) and Toumaï (Sahelanthropus tchadensis) fossils.

The prehistory room, at least in 1965, included items related to pebble culture, including material from the Angamma cliff (in the Borkou), Paleolithic implements, axes with helve-holes, nether millstones, and quartz and obsidian arrowheads. The museum at one time included a full-sized ochre reproduction of a hunting scene from the first millennium B.C. Its collection also included baked bricks, some attributed to Boulala and Babalia people. These items were discovered at the Bouta-Kabira sanctuary including human masks, bronze objects and bone tools.

== See also ==
- List of museums in Chad
