= List of museums in Liechtenstein =

This is a list of museums in Liechtenstein.

== List ==
- Liechtenstein National Museum
  - Postal Museum (Liechtenstein)
- Kunstmuseum Liechtenstein

== See also ==
- List of museums
