= List of museums in Mali =

This is a list of museums in Mali.

== List ==
- National Museum of Mali (Musée National du Mali)
- Muso Kunda Museum of Women (Musée de la Femme)
- Musee de site de Djenné
- Musée Dogon de Fombori "Banque Culturelle"
- Musée du Sahel
- Musée Munincipal de Tombouctou

== See also ==
- List of museums
