= List of museums in Dominica =

This is a list of museums in Dominica.

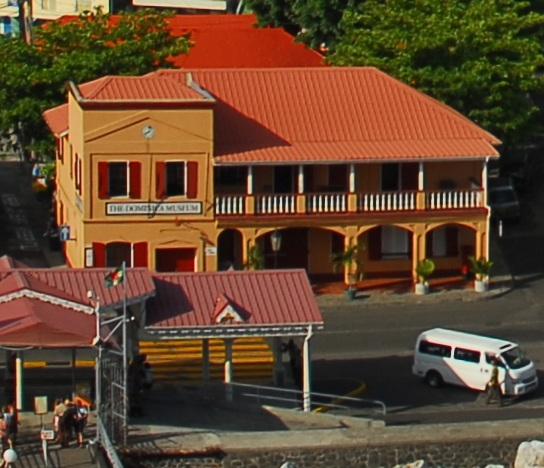
The Dominica Museum

- The Dominica Museum
- Roseau Cathedral crypt
- Old Mill Cultural Centre & Museum
- Touna Kalinago Heritage Village
- Macoucherie Rum Distillery

== See also ==
- List of museums
