= Sierra Leone National Museum =

National museum of Sierra Leone

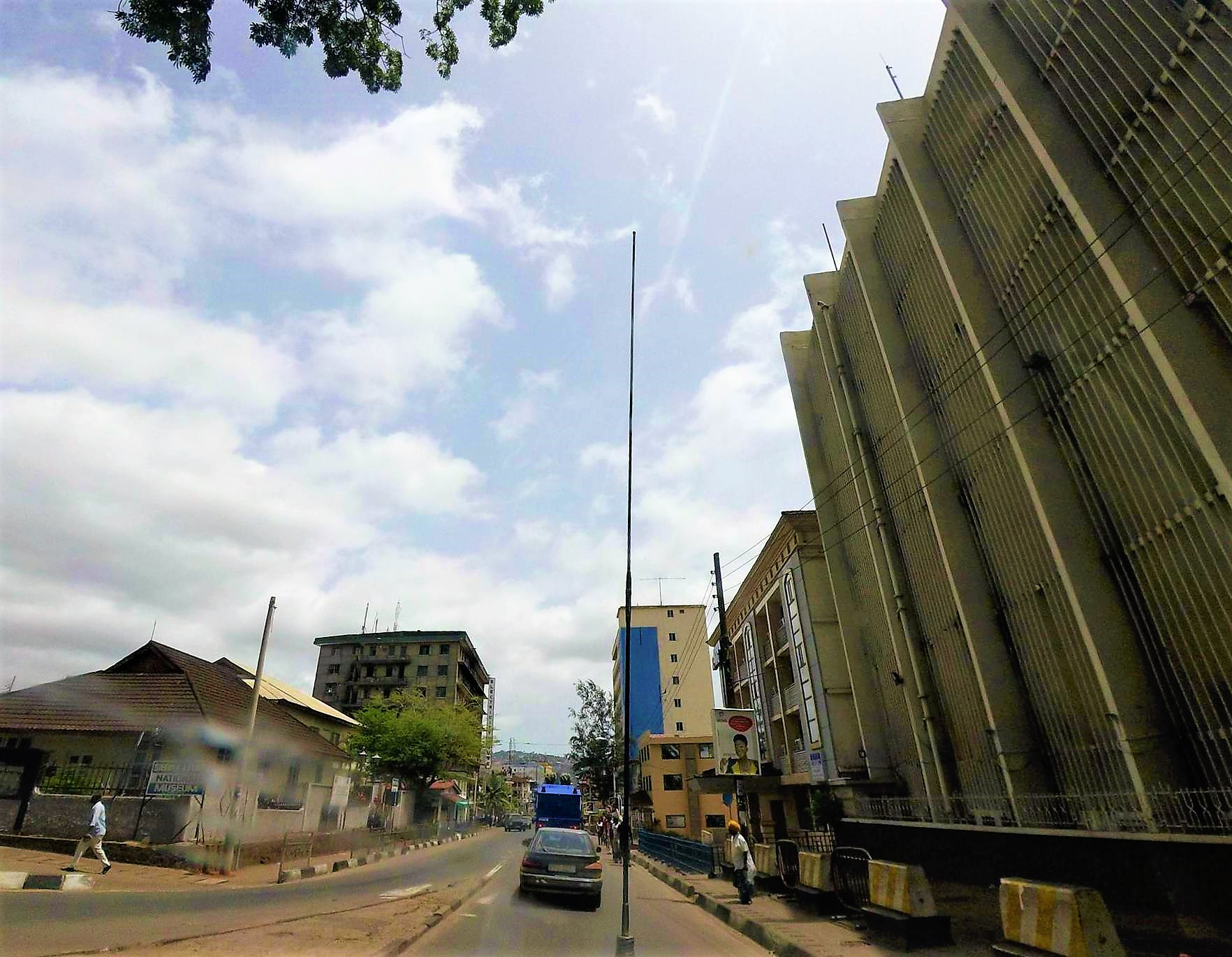

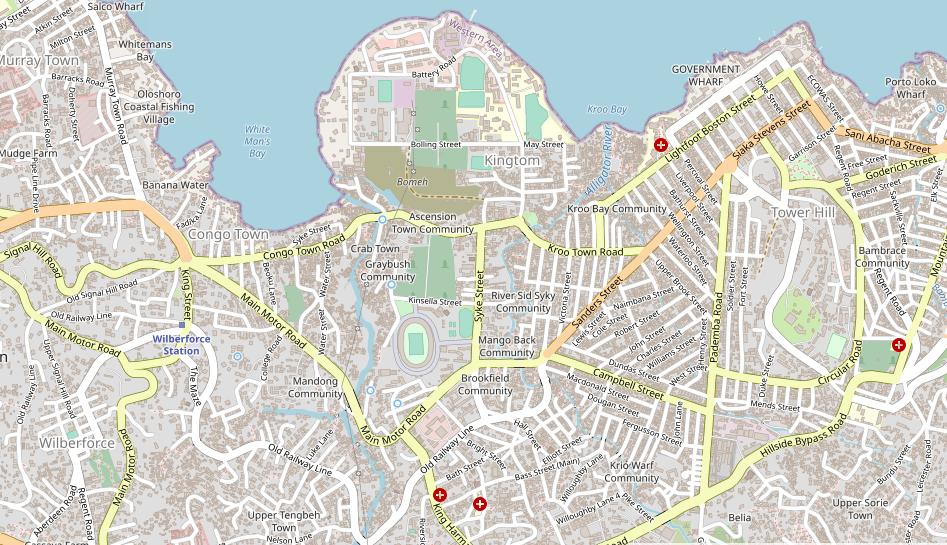
- Location of the National Museum in Freetown
- Established: 1957; 69 years ago
- Location: Freetown, Sierra Leone
- Coordinates: 8.4867°N 13.2358°W,
- Director: Josephine Kargbo
- Website: www.sierraleoneheritage.org/museum

The Sierra Leone National Museum, previously known as the Sierra Leone Museum and the Museum of the Sierra Leone Society, is the national museum of Sierra Leone. it is located at the junction of Siaka Stevens Street and Pademba Road in central Freetown.

== Origin ==
The origin of the Sierra Leone National Museum in Freetown dates back to before the country's independence. The Monuments and Relics Commission, chaired by the retired Creole doctor M. C. F. Easmon, was set up by a 1946 ordinance "to provide for the preservation of Ancient, Historical, and Natural Monuments, Relics, and other objects of Archaeological, Ethnographical, Historical or other Scientific Interest". In 1953, Governor Sir Robert Hall encouraged the formation of the Sierra Leone Society and then challenged its members, mainly colonial expatriates and the Creole elite of the city, to establish a museum. In 1955, he offered the old Cotton Tree Telephone Exchange as a temporary location for the museum for a nominal rent. The place was refurbished, and the Sierra Leone Museum or Museum of the Sierra Leone Society was officially opened on 10 December 1957 by Sir Milton Margai, the chief minister.

== History since independence ==
Sierra Leone gained its independence from the UK in 1961. The Sierra Leone Society ceased to exist in 1964. In 1967, the year the Sierra Leone Museum became the national museum, the Monuments and Relics Commission was granted the authority to "acquire, maintain and administer the Sierra Leone Museum founded by the Sierra Leone Society".

The government has rarely provided much support, and the museum still occupies its original, "temporary" location. The German embassy in Freetown provided funds for an extension, opened in 1987, to mark the bicentennial of the founding of Freetown. The acting chief curator is Josephine Kargbo.

== Collection ==
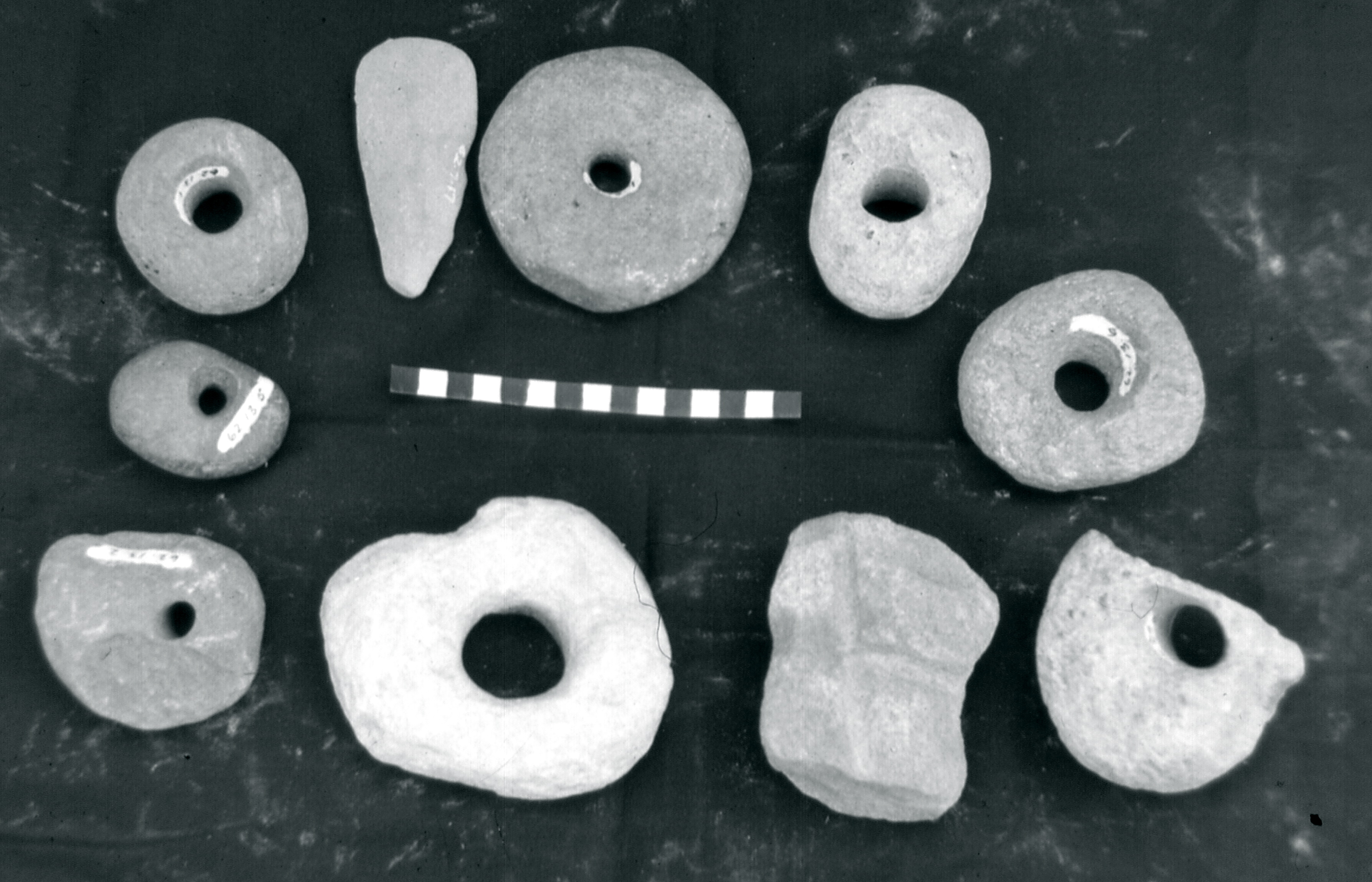
Bored stones on display at the museum

In 2013, the museum displayed the only known photograph of the Temne guerrilla leader Bai Bureh, who in 1898 started a war against the British.

University College London's "Reanimating Cultural Heritage: Digital Repatriation, Knowledge Networks and Civil Society Strengthening in Post-Conflict Sierra Leone" project, in conjunction with the Sierra Leonean Ministry of Cultural Affairs, the National Museum and other organizations and museums, has digitised 2000 objects from the museum, along with objects from other sources.

== See also ==
- List of museums in Sierra Leone
- List of national museums
