= List of museums in Sierra Leone =

Below is a list of museums in Sierra Leone.

== List ==
- Sierra Leone National Museum
- Sierra Leone Peace Museum
- Sierra Leone National Railway Museum

== See also ==
- List of museums
