= National Museum of Somalia =

Museum in Mogadishu

- Matxafka Qaranka Soomaaliya
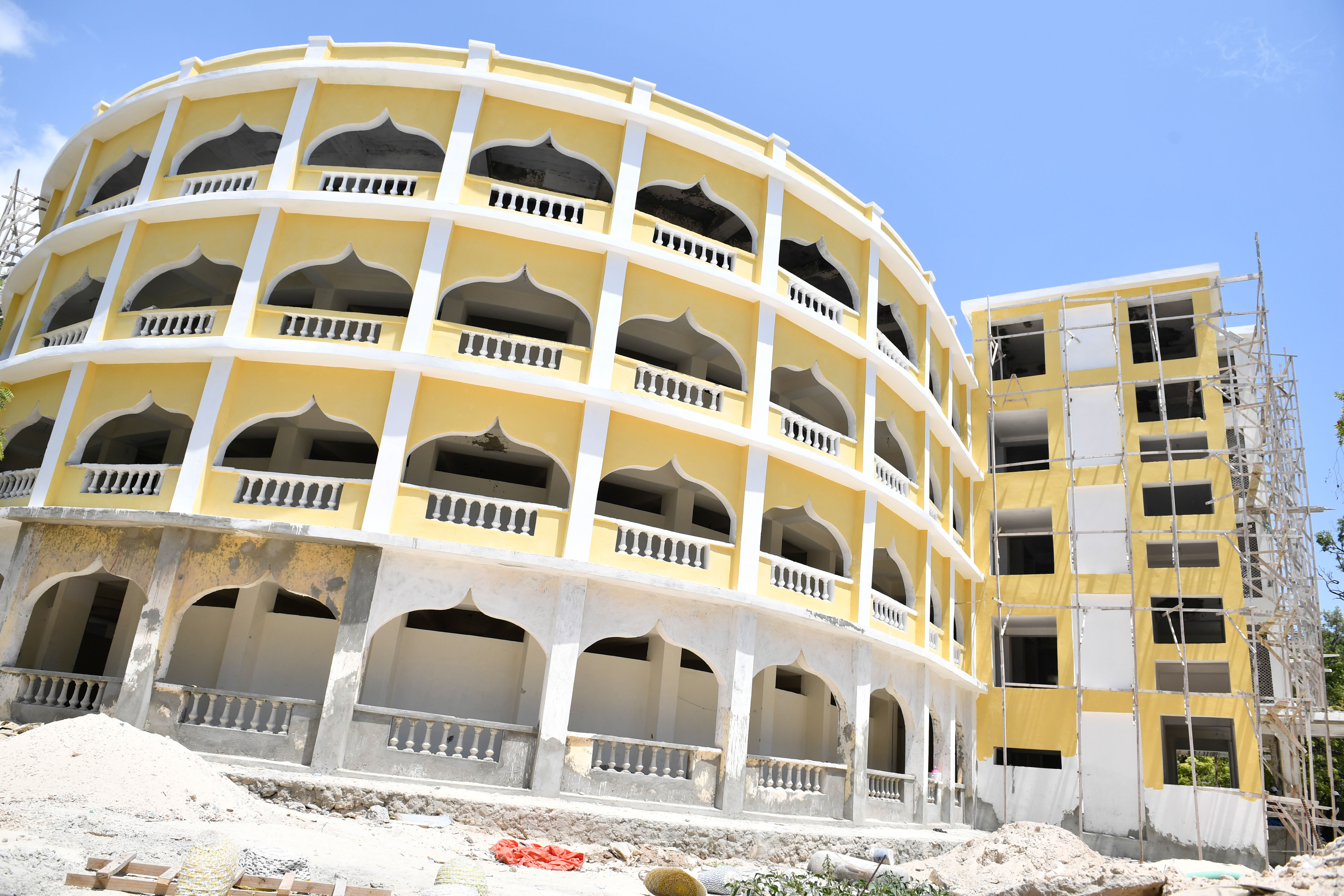
- National Museum of Somalia under renovation in 2020
- Established: 1933 (original); 1 July 2020 (reopened)
- Location: Mogadishu, Banaadir, Somalia
- Coordinates: 2°02′34.8″N 45°20′13.8″E
- Director: Ahmed Farah Warsame
- Website: snm.gov.so

The National Museum of Somalia (Matxafka Qaranka Soomaaliya) is a national museum in Mogadishu, the capital of Somalia. It was originally established in 1933 by the colonial authorities of Italian Somaliland. After the building was destroyed and the museum's collections were largely lost during the Somali Civil War, it officially reopened in July 2020 after a comprehensive rebuilding and restoration effort.

The museum is housed in a four-story building and holds a number of important historical artifacts, including ancient coins, traditional artwork, weaponry, and pottery. Its reopening is considered a significant milestone in the revival of Somali cultural heritage after decades of conflict.

== Original museum ==
=== Garesa Museum ===
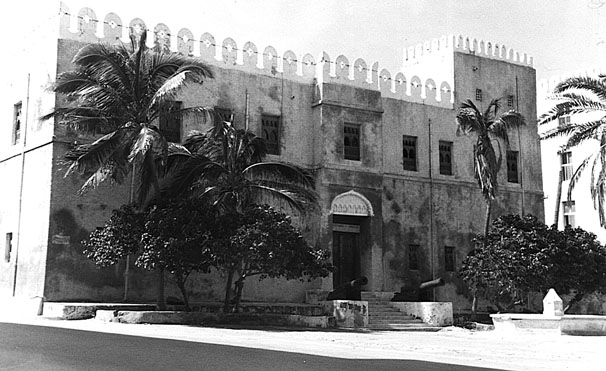
The original Garesa building which housed the first museum

The National Museum of Somalia was first housed in a two-story building that dates back to 1872. It was built for the Sultan of Zanzibar, Barghash bin Said, to serve as a residence (called Garesa) for the governor of Mogadishu.

In 1933, the building was reconstructed and adapted to become the Museo della Somalia. It was officially opened to the public the following year by Governor Maurizio Rava. The museum suffered heavy damage during World War II. After Somalia's independence in 1960, it was converted into the National Museum. When a new, larger building was constructed for the National Museum in 1985, the original building was renamed the Garesa Museum and became a regional museum.

=== New National Museum building (1985–1991) ===
In 1985, a new cultural center was opened in Mogadishu, consisting of the National Theatre, the National Library, and the new National Museum. The museum was a four-story building with exhibition halls dedicated to archaeology, ethnography, colonial resistance, historical arms, and temporary exhibits. The director-general at the opening was Ahmed Farah Warsame.

== Destruction and revival ==
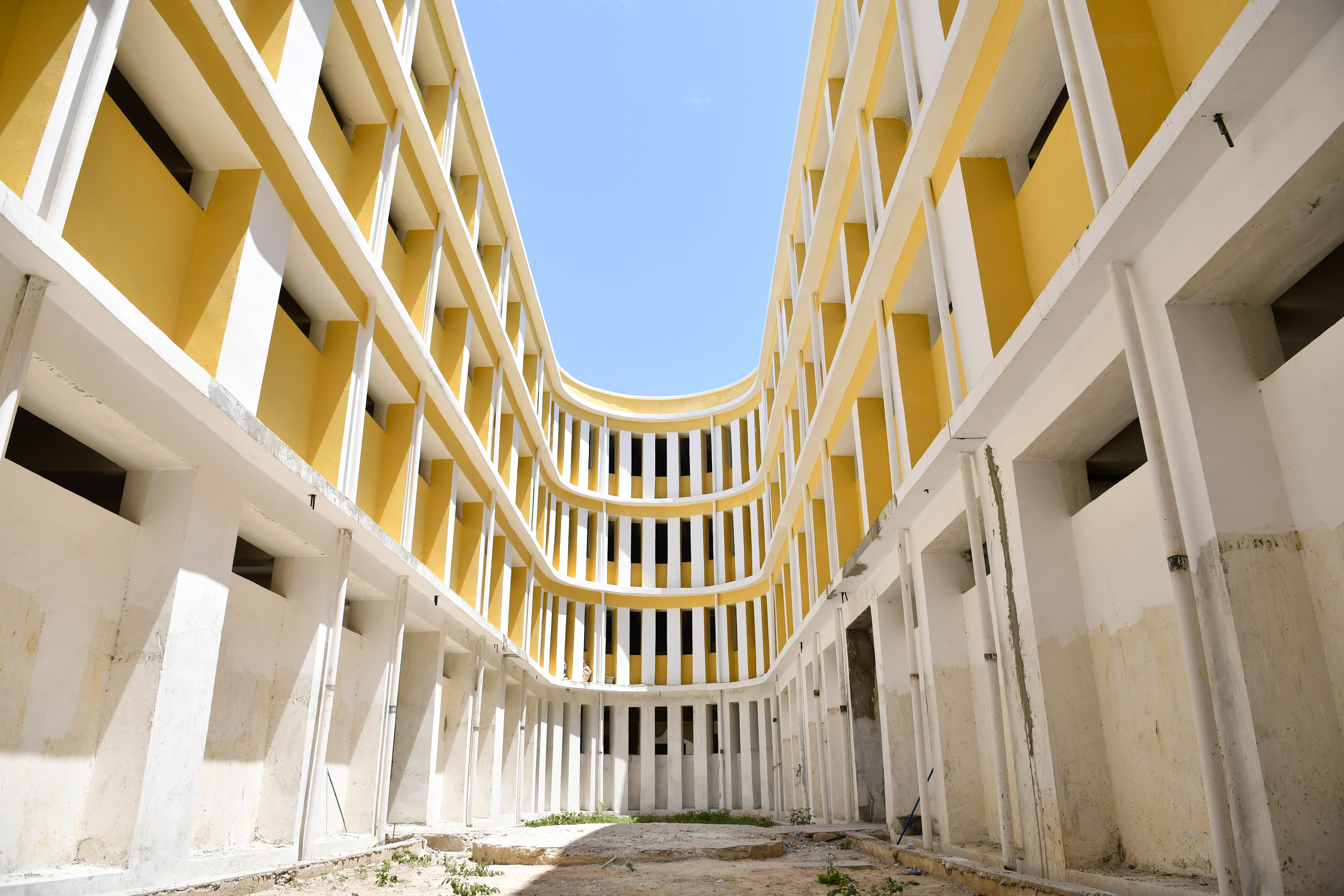
Somalia National Museum courtyard under renovation, February 2020

Following the outbreak of the Somali Civil War in 1991, both museum buildings were destroyed, the infrastructure was heavily damaged, and the collections were looted or destroyed. For nearly three decades, Somalia was without a national museum.

In 2019, the Federal Government of Somalia, with international support including from UNESCO, began a major project to rebuild and re-equip the 1985 museum building. Staff were trained, and a campaign was launched to recover lost artifacts. The museum officially reopened on July 1, 2020. The current director, Osman Geedow Amir, has emphasized the museum's role as a symbol of peace and a place for Somalis to reconnect with their history.

== Collections ==
While many of the original artifacts were lost, the reopened museum is gradually rebuilding its collection. It currently holds a variety of culturally important items, including ancient coins from different Somali sultanates, bartering tools, traditional artwork, ancient weaponry, and pottery items. The museum also hosts exhibitions on modern Somali history and contemporary art.

== See also ==
- Mogadishu
- List of museums in Somalia
