= List of museums in Honduras =

This is a list of museums in Honduras.

== List ==
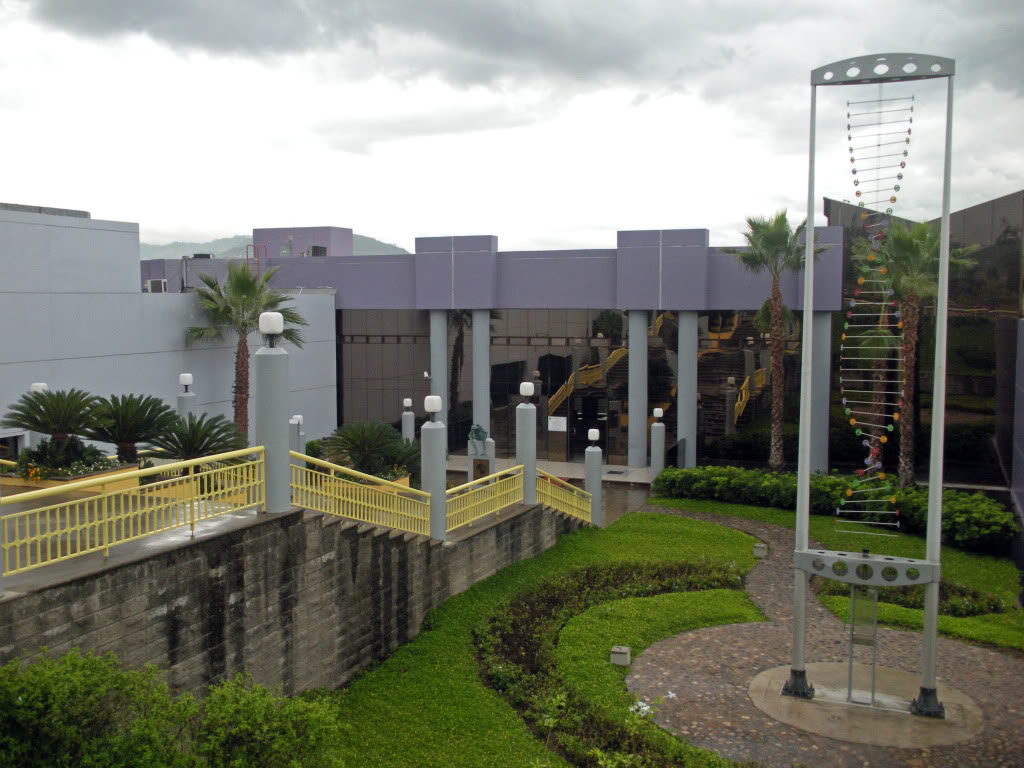
Chiminike Museum in Tegucigalpa

- National Gallery of Art
- Honduran Aviation Museum
- Museo Arqueologico de Comayagua
- Museo de Antropología e Historia de San Pedro Sula
- Museo de la Fortaleza de San Fernando de Omoa
- Museo de la Identidad Nacional
- Museo de la Naturaleza (Honduras)
- Museo de las mariposas (Honduras)
- Museo de las telecomunicaciones (Honduras)
- Museo de los Naranjos
- Museo de los Palacios
- Museo de Trujillo
- Museo del Hombre Hondureño
- Museo Numismatico "Rigoberto Borjas"
- Museo Pequeño Sula para la Infancia
- Museo Santa María de los Angeles
- Parque Arqueológico Cuevas de Talgua
