= South Sudan National Museum =

Mobile museum in South Sudan

South Sudan National Museum is a mobile community-based national museum in South Sudan.

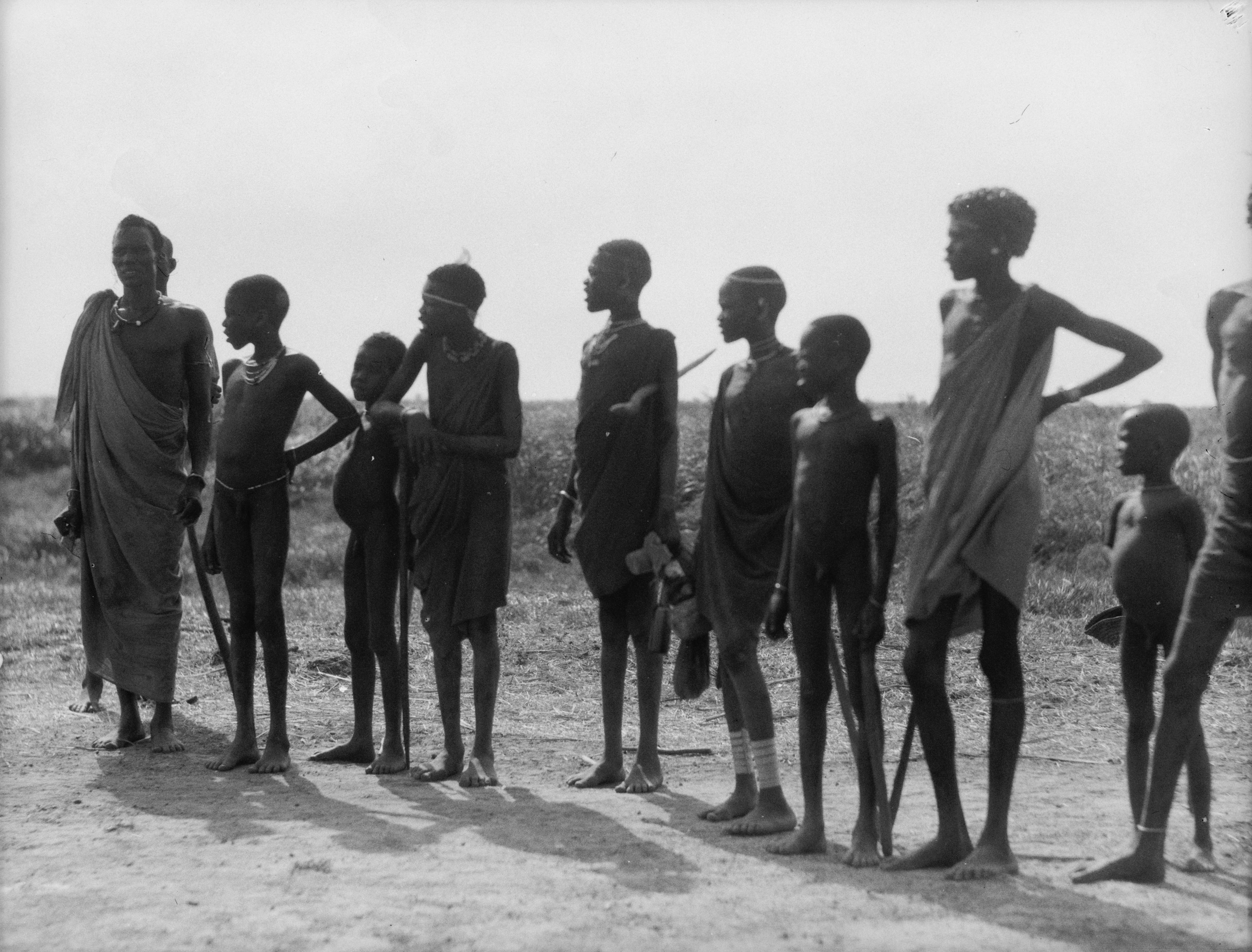
South Sudan Malakal Shiluki group in 1936

The pilot phase was launched by UNESCO in 2014. The museum is in mobile form, visiting local communities in remote areas of the country. The museum collection consists of material presenting life stories, using photographs, video/audio recordings, and other objects.

== See also ==
- List of museums in South Sudan
