= List of museums in Belize =

This is a list of museums in Belize.

== Museums in Belize ==
- Ambergris Museum
- Belmopan Museum
- Bliss Institute
- Image Factory Art Foundation and Gallery
- Maritime Museum (Belize)
- Museum of Belize
- Old Belize Museum and Cucumber Beach

== See also ==
- List of museums
