= Muso Kunda Museum of Women =

- Musée de la Femme Muso Kunda
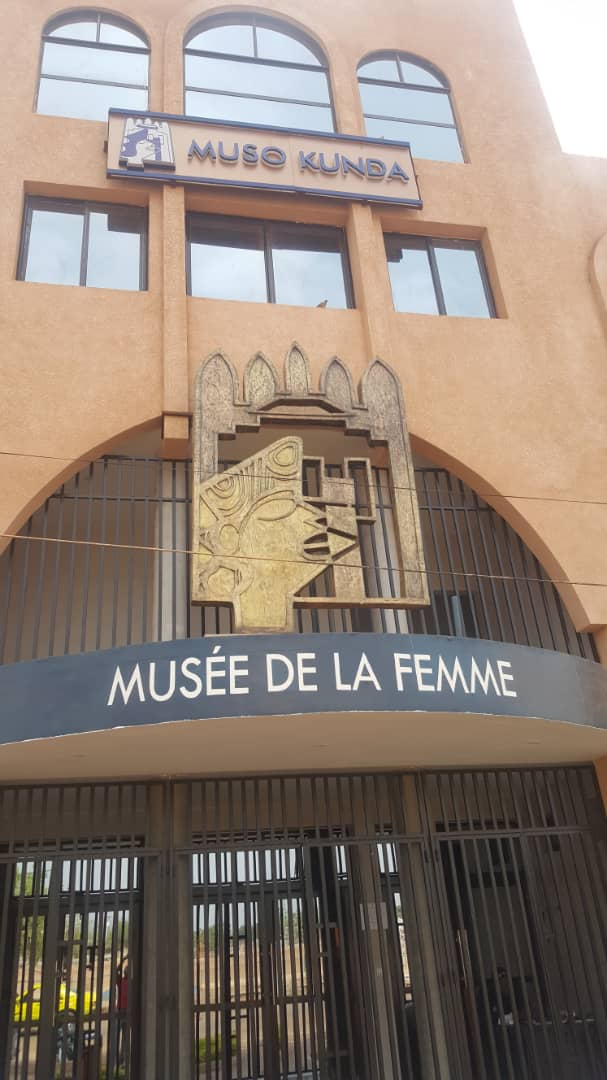
- Muso Kunda Museum of Women, Bamako
- Established: 1995
- Location: Korofina Nord, Bamako, Mali
- Coordinates: 12.6678°N 7.9528°W
- Type: Women's Museum
- Collection size: 500 artifacts
- Founder: Adame Ba Konaré
- Website: musokunda.org

The Muso Kunda Women's Museum, established in 1995, is an institution dedicated to showcasing and promote the cause of women in Mali. The Museum was founded by Malian feminist and historian Adame Ba Konaré in Bomako. The museum seeks to break stereotypes of women, celebrate their contributions, defend their rights and to create spaces for conversations.

== Establishment ==
The museum was established in Bamako in the year 1995 by feminist and historian Adame Ba Konaré. Adame is the first lady and spouse of President Alpha Oumar Konaré.

The museum seeks to promote the cause of women and the defense of their rights. The museum seeks to promote and foster the skills of women in various walks of life while covering the traditional and contemporary aspects. The museum also aspires to be a space that furthers the "memory" of women.

== Museum galleries ==
=== Democracy heroes of 1991 ===
At the entrance of the Museum, there is wall of portraits of women heroes from the March 1991 revolution. The revolution led to a transition government that eventually handed over to a democratically elected leader.

=== Traditional costume gallery ===
The traditional costume gallery covers costumes of women from the Mali tribes.

An ensemble of fifteen mannequins in the hall showcase fourteen traditional costumes of women from the Regions of Mali with the fifteenth showcasing the outfit of a modern Mali woman. The mannequins were made by a North Korean company operating out of Bamako. Some of the costumes displayed are those of the Soninke, the Khassonké from Kayes, the Fulani from Mopti, the Bambara from Ségou and even traditional jewellery sourced from a hundred year old Senufo lady.

=== Women in National building ===
An exhibit covering the role of Malian women in various walks of life, politics, development, national movements and nation building. The exhibit showcases the contribution of Malian women and seeks to correct the prevailing stereotypes about women. Some of the women showcased are Fanta Damba (singer, griot), Aoua Kéita (first woman in the upper rung of the US-RDA party and Fanta Diallo (Member, social commission for women).

=== Home Tools and Technology ===
A gallery showcases the tools used by women at home for various functions. It showcases how these tools have evolved since the past by the adoption of technology in recent times. This "then" and "now" demonstrates how the context has changed for women in daily life and also how women have been active in adopting in newer technologies. Some of the objects showcased include cooking tools, grinding tools, fishing tools and tools for collection, storage and selling milk.

=== Film showcase ===
An audio visual gallery showcases movies covering the themes of women's rights. The movies displayed here are those of three young film makers. The movies showcased were selected by a competition.

== Journal ==
Faro is the cultural journal and publication of the Muso Kunda Museum. The journal is named after Faro, a goddess of the Niger River.

== Other facilities ==
The museum has the following other facilities:

- Research center
- Library
- Museum store

== See also ==
- List of museums in Mali
