= List of museums in Equatorial Guinea =

Below is a list of museums in Equatorial Guinea.

== List ==
- Claretian Mission Ethnological Museum
- Museum of Modern Art Equatorial Guinea

== See also ==
- List of museums
