= List of museums in Guinea-Bissau =

This is a list of museums in Guinea-Bissau.

== List ==
- National Ethnographic Museum (Guinea-Bissau)
- Historical Museum of Cacheu

== See also ==
- List of museums
