= List of museums in Chad =

This is a list of museums in Chad.

== List ==
- Chad National Museum in N'Djamena
- Musée Régional de Sarh in Sarh
- Musée d'Abéché in Abéché (defunct since 2018)

== See also ==
- List of museums
