= List of museums in Tuvalu =

Tuvalu does not have any museums, however the creation of a Tuvalu National Cultural Centre and Museum is part of the government's strategic plan for 2018–24.
