= Kosrae State Museum =

Museum in Tofol, Federated States of Micronesia

- Kosrae State Museum
- Founder: Teddy John
- Type: Governmental
- Location: Federated States of Micronesia
- Coordinates: 05°19′30.7″N 163°00′30.8″E
- Parent organization: Kosrae State Historic Preservation Office
- Website: https://kosraehpo.wordpress.com/museum/

Kosrae State Museum is a museum in Tofol in Kosrae State in the Federated States of Micronesia.

== Background ==
Planning for Kosrae State Museum began in 1981. It was founded by Teddy John.

== Collections ==
Kosrae State Museum is situated in Tofol. Its collection is made up of archaeological assemblages from several of Kosrae's significant historic sites. The collection also includes objects relating to Kosrae's history and culture more widely, including archaeological artefacts. The museum contains models of traditional homes. In 2001 the museum moved to a new location in Tofol. Its redevelopment was funded by the US Government, the FSM Government and Kosrae State. The museum's exhibits include displays on: prehistoric Kosrae, early contact, nineteenth century whaling and missionary activity, the Second World War and contemporary Kosrae. The museum hosts significant collections, including: artwork from the Lütke Expedition; the Carl Hupp collection; Ernst Sarfert.

=== Overseas collections ===
Due to legacies of colonial exploitation, museum collections abroad hold significant objects and archives, relating to Kosraean material culture, including: Welt Museum, Vienna; the British Museum; National Museums Scotland.

=== Repatriation ===
A Kosraean tol 'man's sash' was returned to Kosrae from a foreign museum collection.

== Research ==
In the early 2000s, the museum became a partner in a visual anthropology research project run by the University of Florida, which trained museum staff in film-making and enabled them to continue work documenting intangible culture in the state. In 2013 the museum undertook surveys to see if an open-air archaeological exhibit could become part of the museum. In 2018 the museum and Kosrae Historic Preservation Office partnered on a research partnership to explore how virtual reality models of the archaeological heritage of the islands could engage with stakeholders and members of the Kosraean diaspora.

== Notable people ==
- Teddy John
- Berlin Sigrah
