= Kara Regional Museum =

Regional museum in Kara, Togo

Coordinates: 9.5607°N 1.1802°E

- Established: 1983
- Location: Kara Congress Palace, Kara, Togo
- Type: Ethnographic museum
- Collections: Ethnography, history and cultural heritage

The Kara Regional Museum (French: Musée régional de Kara) is a museum in Kara, Togo.

Located within the Kara Congress Palace, it preserves and displays objects relating to the traditions, social practices and cultural history of the peoples of the region.

== History ==
The museum opened in 1983. It is one of Togo's regional public museums, alongside the Maritime Regional Museum in Aného, the Central Regional Museum in Sokodé and the Savanes Regional Museum in Dapaong.

== Description ==
=== Location ===
Kara Congress Palace

The Kara Regional Museum is housed within the Kara Congress Palace.

=== Collections ===
The museum displays objects relating to everyday life and the cultural heritage of the peoples of the Kara Region. Its collections include agricultural and hunting tools, household ustensiles, musical instruments, traditional clothing, ritual objects and photographs.

The collections document agricultural practices, crafts, weaving, traditional ceremonies, funeral rites and other social practices.

The museum also preserves documents and photographs relating to the contemporary history of Togo. These include material relating to former Togolese president Gnassingbé Eyadéma, who came from the region, and the 1974 Sarakawa plane crash.

=== Conservation and collection management ===
Interior of the museum

In May 2024, a technical team from Togo's Directorate of Cultural Heritage conducted an assessment of the conservation of collections in the country's public museums. The Kara Regional Museum was among the institutions visited during the assessment.

The assessment examined objects in the permanent exhibition and museum storage, their documentation, their state of conservation and the measures required to improve their protection.

== See also ==
- Kara, Togo
- Kara Region
- Koutammakou
