= Buxton/Friendship Museum Archive & Culture Center =

Museum in Georgetown. Guyana

Coordinates: 6°47′21″N 58°01′36″W

The Buxton/Friendship Museum Archive & Culture Center (BFMACC) is a museum located in Buxton Village, East Coast Demerara, Guyana, and combines the functions of a museum, archive, and cultural center. Its stated focus is preserving the history and culture of Buxton/Friendship and surrounding communities.

Opened in August 2018, the BFMACC aims to preserve and increase understanding of the history, culture, and contributions of the residents of Buxton/Friendship and nearby villages. And serve as a center for education and cultural activities within the community. It places particular emphasis on the post-emancipation history, including the purchase of Plantation Buxton and Plantation Friendship by ex-slaves.

The museum houses materials related to the history and culture of the communities within its scope, including historical documents, books, artifacts, photographs, and paintings. A permanent collection highlighted by the museum features depictions of historical buildings in the Buxton/Friendship area, with noted contributions from Buxtonian artist Lyndon Barton.
