= List of museums in Niger =

This is a list of museums in Niger.

== List ==
- Musée National Boubou Hama, Niamey
- Musée Régional de Dosso
- Musée Régional de Zinder

== See also ==
- List of museums
