= The State Museum of the State Cultural Center of Turkmenistan =

Museum in Ashgabat, Turkmenistan

- Türkmenistanyň Döwlet Muzeýi
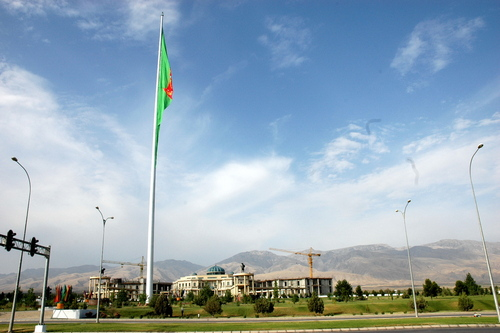
- The State Museum of the State Cultural Center of Turkmenistan in front of Ashgabat Flagpole

- Location within Turkmenistan
- Established: 1998
- Location: Ashgabat, Turkmenistan
- Coordinates: 37.8851°N 58.3489°E
- Type: National museum
- Website: museum.gov.tm/en

The State Museum of Turkmenistan (Turkmen: Türkmenistanyň Döwlet Muzeýi), also known as the Saparmurat Turkmenbashi Museum, is a museum in Ashgabat, Turkmenistan. The museum was opened on 12 November 1998. The museum has seven permanent galleries incorporating history, present day culture, and ethnography.

== Collections ==
As of 2013, the museum was split into three sections: natural history, science, and the President of Turkmenistan. Photography is forbidden in any part of the museum, and all visitors are followed by a museum employee during their stay. Many artifacts and photographs are clear fakes or digitally edited.

=== Natural history ===
The museum contains a large collection of ancient artifacts. However many are overly intricate, in pristine condition, and many thousand years old leading to questions about their authenticity.

It contains over 500,000 exhibits particularly archaeological and ethnographical finds throughout the country including rare works of ancient art, paintings, drawings, sculptures, carpets, rugs, fabrics and clothing; household utensils, musical instruments, weapons, jewelry, medals, historical documents, horn-shaped vessels made of ivory, statuettes of Parthian goddesses and colourful Buddhist vases.

It also contains a significant number of fossils and rare geological finds.

=== President ===
The museum has one third of its floor space dedicated to the current President of Turkmenistan. In this section are images of the president doing a wide variety of things, including harvesting crops with his citizens, racing autos, reading with children, playing sports, and meeting world leaders.

=== Science ===
The section of the museum dedicated to science has no English captions, even though the rest of the museum does.

== See also ==
- Neutrality Arch, Ashgabat, Turkmenistan
