= List of museums in Samoa =

This is a list of museums in Samoa:

- EFKS Museum
- Falemata'aga - The Museum of Samoa
- Robert Louis Stevenson Museum
- Samoa Cultural Centre
- Tiapapata Art Centre
- Vanya Taule'alo Gallery
