= National Gallery of Bosnia and Herzegovina =

- Umjetnička Galerija Bosne i Hercegovine

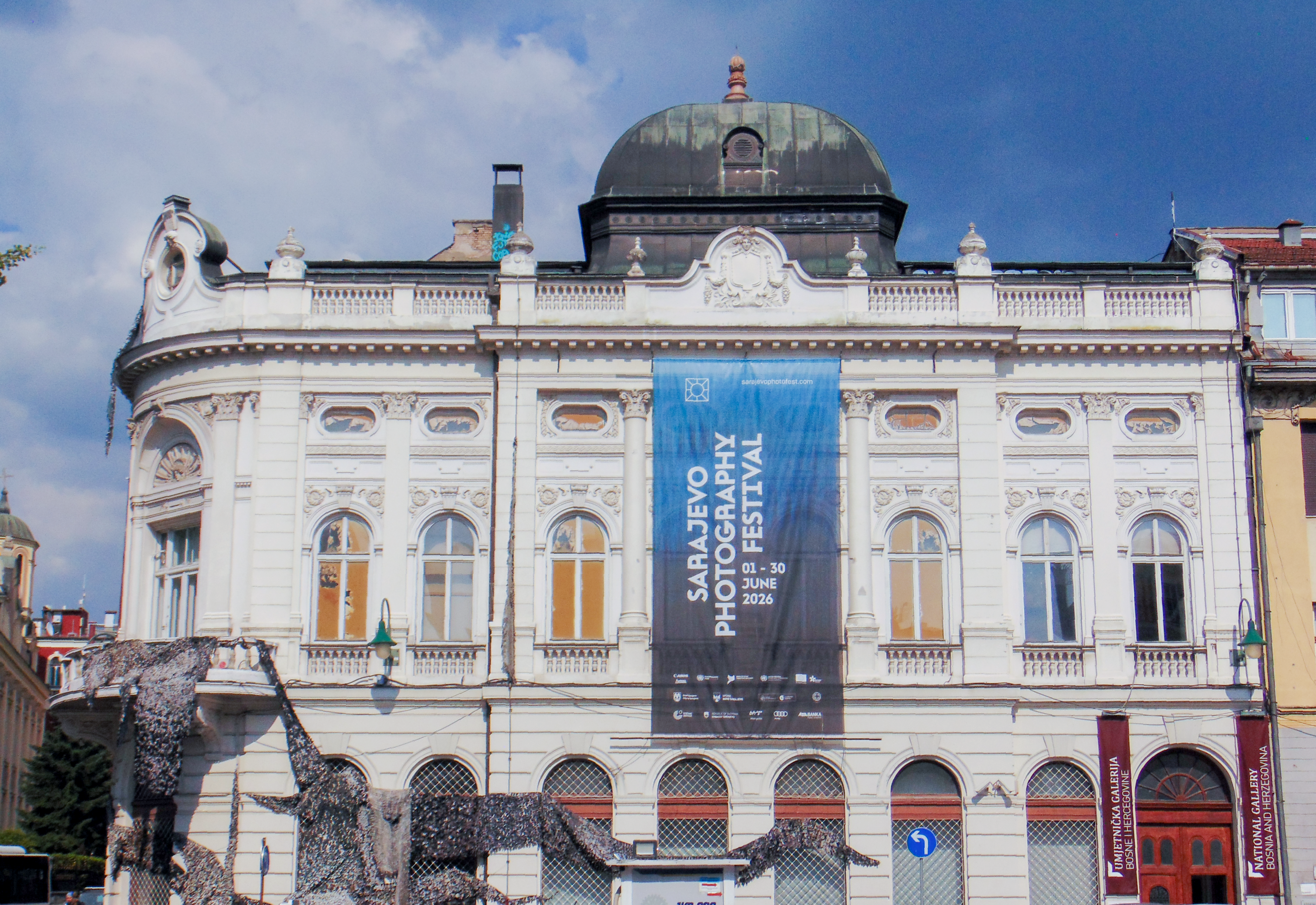
- National Gallery of Bosnia and Herzegovina 2026
- Established: 11 October 1946
- Location: Sarajevo, Bosnia and Herzegovina
- Coordinates: 43°51′28″N 18°25′28″E
- Type: Art Museum
- Collection size: 22,000
- Director: Strajo Krsmanović
- Curators: Maja Abdomerović, Dragana Brkić, Ana Đikoli
- Architect: Josip Vancaš
- Website: www.ugbih.ba

The National Gallery of Bosnia and Herzegovina (Bosnian, Croatian and Serbian: Umjetnička galerija Bosne i Hercegovine / Умјетинчка галерија Босне и Херцеговине) is a national gallery of art in Bosnia and Herzegovina, located in Sarajevo. The gallery was established on October 11, 1946, and contains over 6000 pieces of art. Its main focus are the works of Bosnian and Herzegovinian interest. The gallery was open and held exhibitions during the whole period of the siege of Sarajevo and the Bosnian war in 1992–1995. However, afterwards it received considerably less funding due to the failure of the government of Bosnia and Herzegovina to recognize the gallery as a national institution.

The National Gallery of Bosnia and Herzegovina was closed in September 2011 for almost a year because the gallery was unable to appoint a new director. The institution was opened in August 2012 with the arrival of acting director Strajo Krsmanović.

== See also ==
- List of national galleries
