= List of museums in Solomon Islands =

This is a list of museums in the Solomon Islands:

- Solomon Islands National Museum
- Vilu Military Museum
- Peter Joseph WW2 Museum
- Willie Besi War Museum
