= Yap Living History Museum =

Museum in the Federated States of Micronesia

Coordinates: 9°30′58″N 138°7′18″E

- Yap Living History Museum
- Abbreviation: YLHM
- Formation: December 7, 2011; 14 years ago
- Legal status: Non-profit
- Location: Federated States of Micronesia
- Key people: Don Evans (Chairman)
- Website: https://www.facebook.com/YapLivingHistoryMuseum

Yap Living History Museum is a museum in Colonia, Yap, in the Federated States of Micronesia. It is a living history museum which is dedicated to Yapese culture.

== Background ==
Yap Living History Museum opened on 7 December 2011. Its creation was supported by a €60,000 grant from the French government. The museum was modelled on the Jean-Marie Tjibaou Cultural Centre in New Caledonia. Its creation was organised as a partnership between Yap Visitors Bureau and Yap State Historic Preservation Office. The museum is governed by an advisory board. In 1988 there were doubts over the foundation of the museum, since at the time there were only 1000 tourists visiting Yap each year.

== Buildings ==
The museum consists of four traditionally built houses, as well as a climate-controlled collections centre. The collections building is built in the style of a German colonial property, so that the museum is able to represent this era of the state's history. Re-enactment is also an important aspect of the work of the museum. There are also a number of platforms, as well as examples of stone money. The traditional buildings are used for events, in particular those that support the continuation of Yaps cultural heritage practises, such as the Stone Money Carry. It is also the location for Yap's annual canoe festival, celebrating Micronesian navigation, as well the Homecoming Festival and Yap Day. The audiences intended for many of these events are often tourists.

== Collections and research ==
In 2019 the museum acquired the collection of Art Bergist, who had worked on Yap as a Peace Corps volunteer and teacher in the 1970s. This collection included educational materials, paintings and traditional shell money. In 2015 the museum welcomed visitors from the University of Hawaiʻi at Hilo in order to strengthen connections between cultural heritage researchers in Yap, Palau and Hawai'i.

=== Overseas collections ===
As a legacy of colonial occupation, many objects relating to Yap's cultural heritage are held in collections overseas, including: the British Museum; National Museums Scotland; Hearst Museum of Anthropology; the Penn Museum; the Metropolitan Museum of Art, amongst others. In particular, Yap's Rai stones are held in several overseas museums, such as: National Museum of American History; Museum of the National Bank of Belgium; Bremen Museum; Osaka Museum; RBI Kolkata and others.

==== Gallery of Yapese artefacts held in overseas collections ====
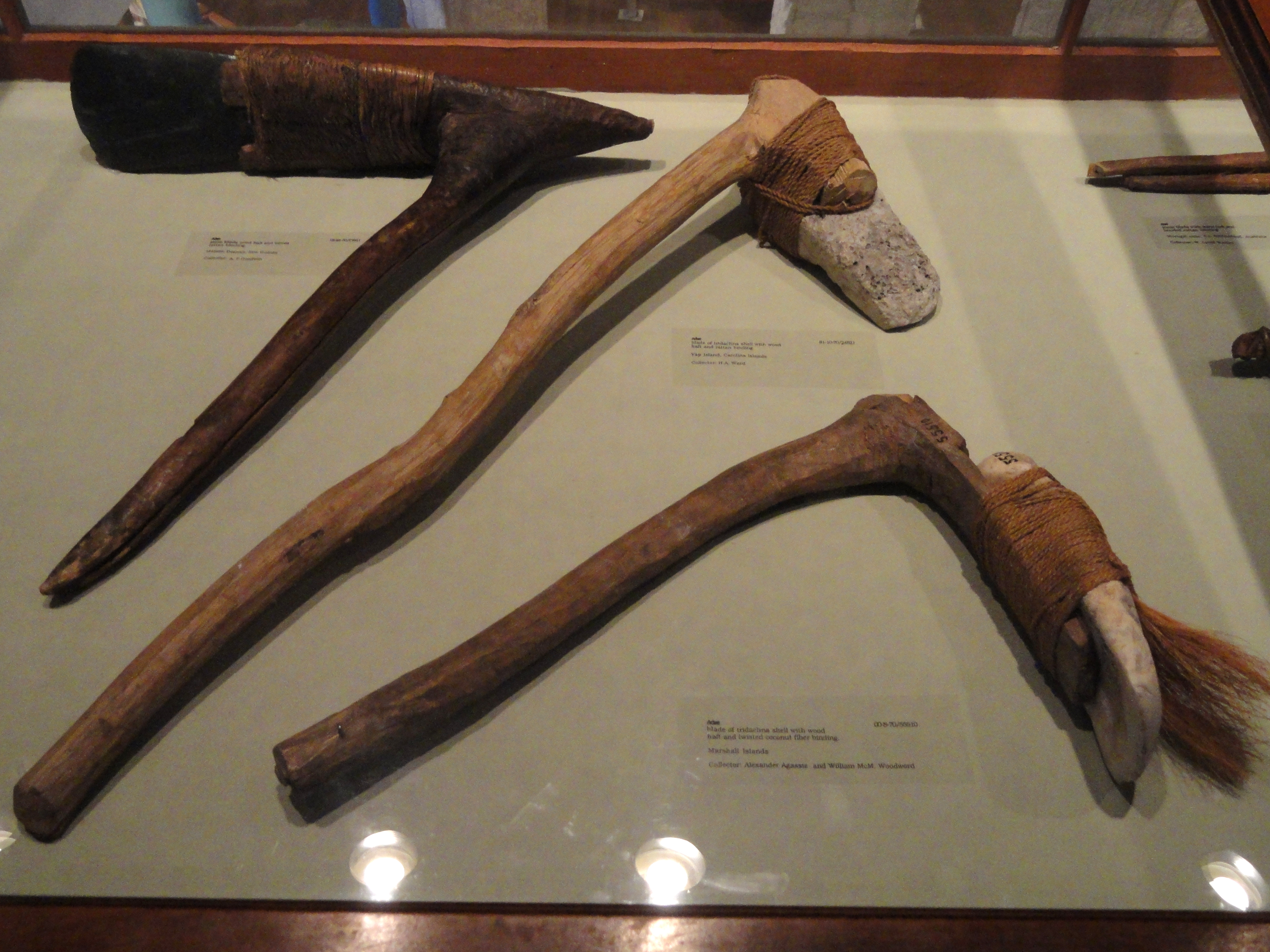
Adzes, including one from Yap, in the Peabody Museum

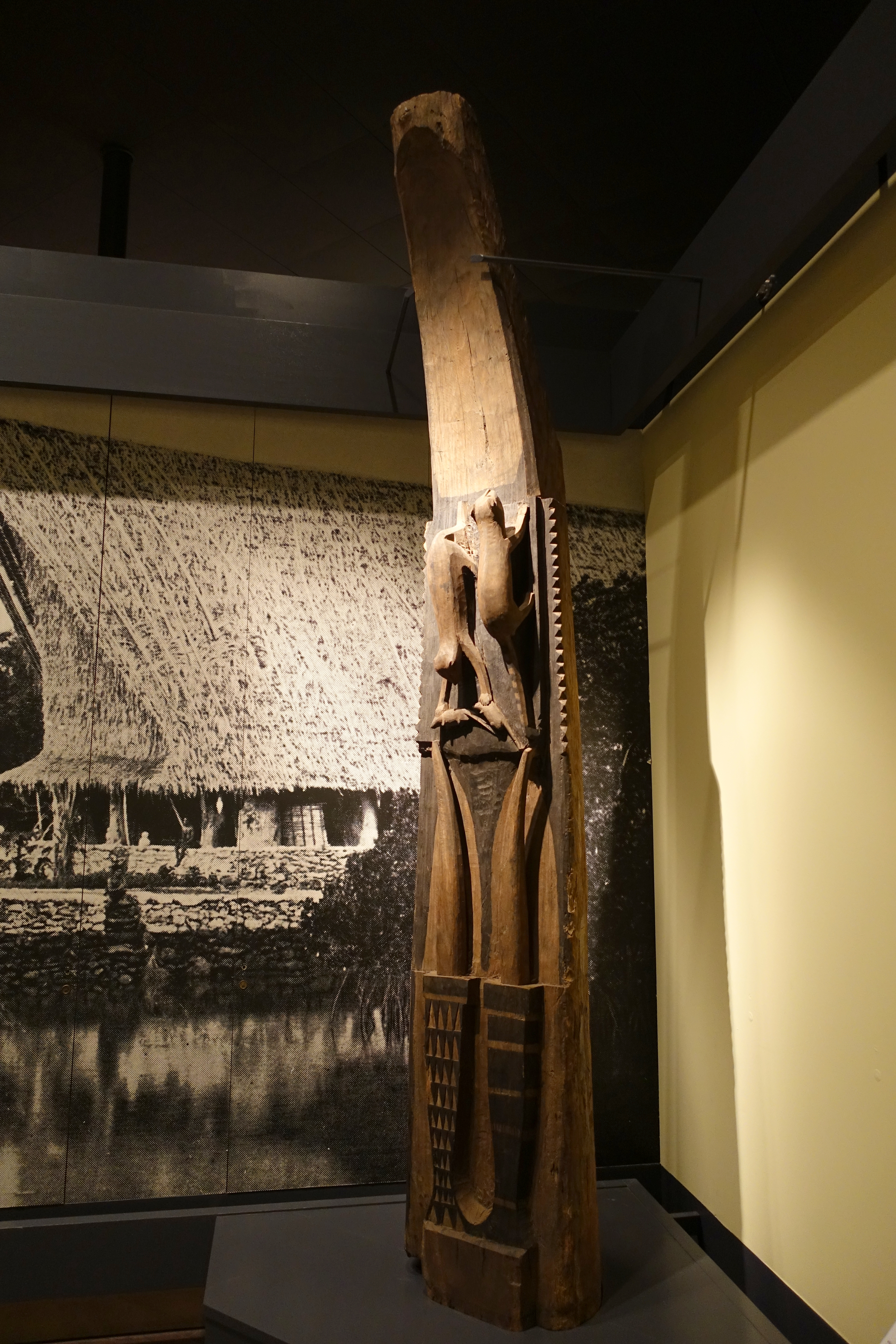
House post in Berlin Ethnological Museum

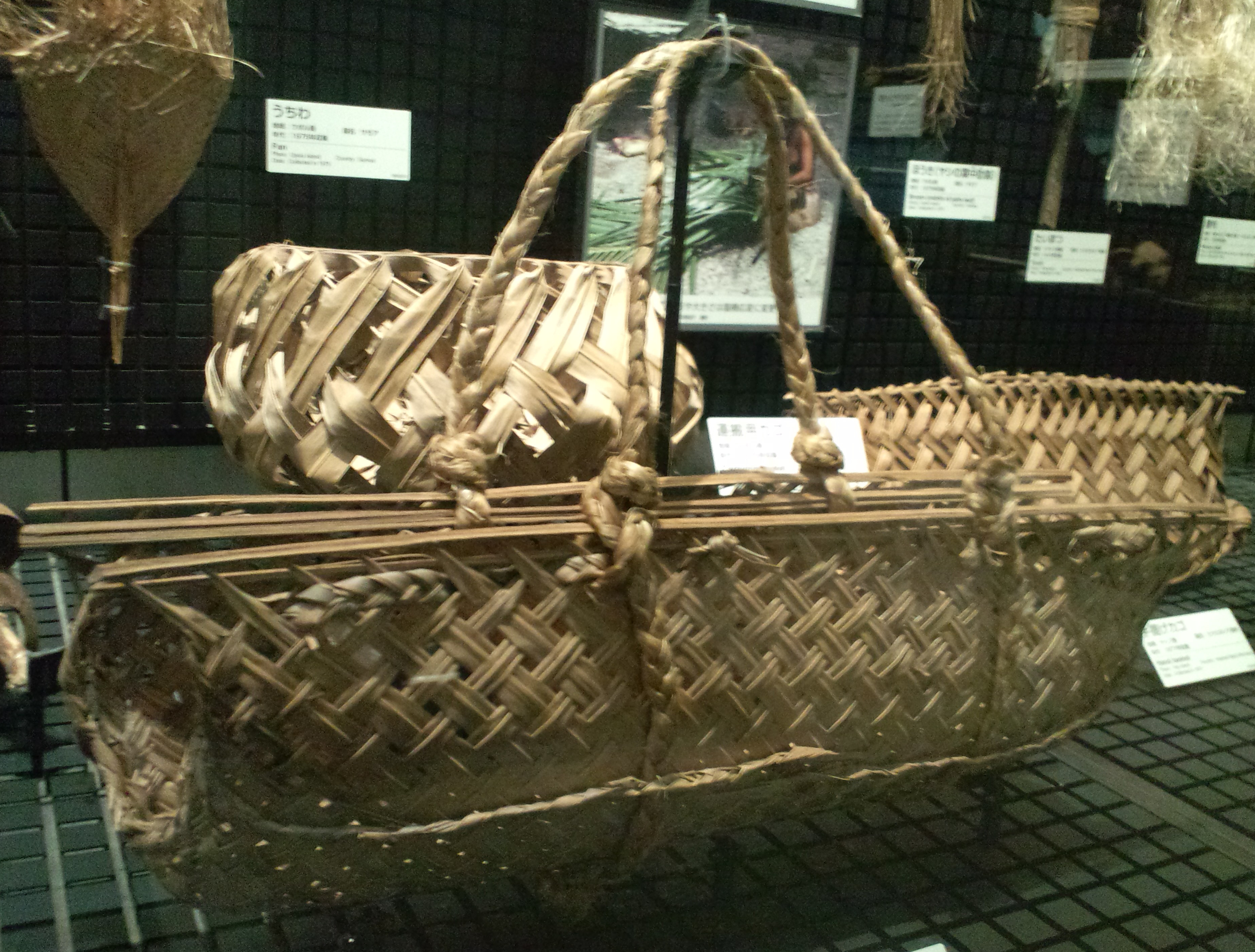
Woven bassinet from Yap, Osaka Museum

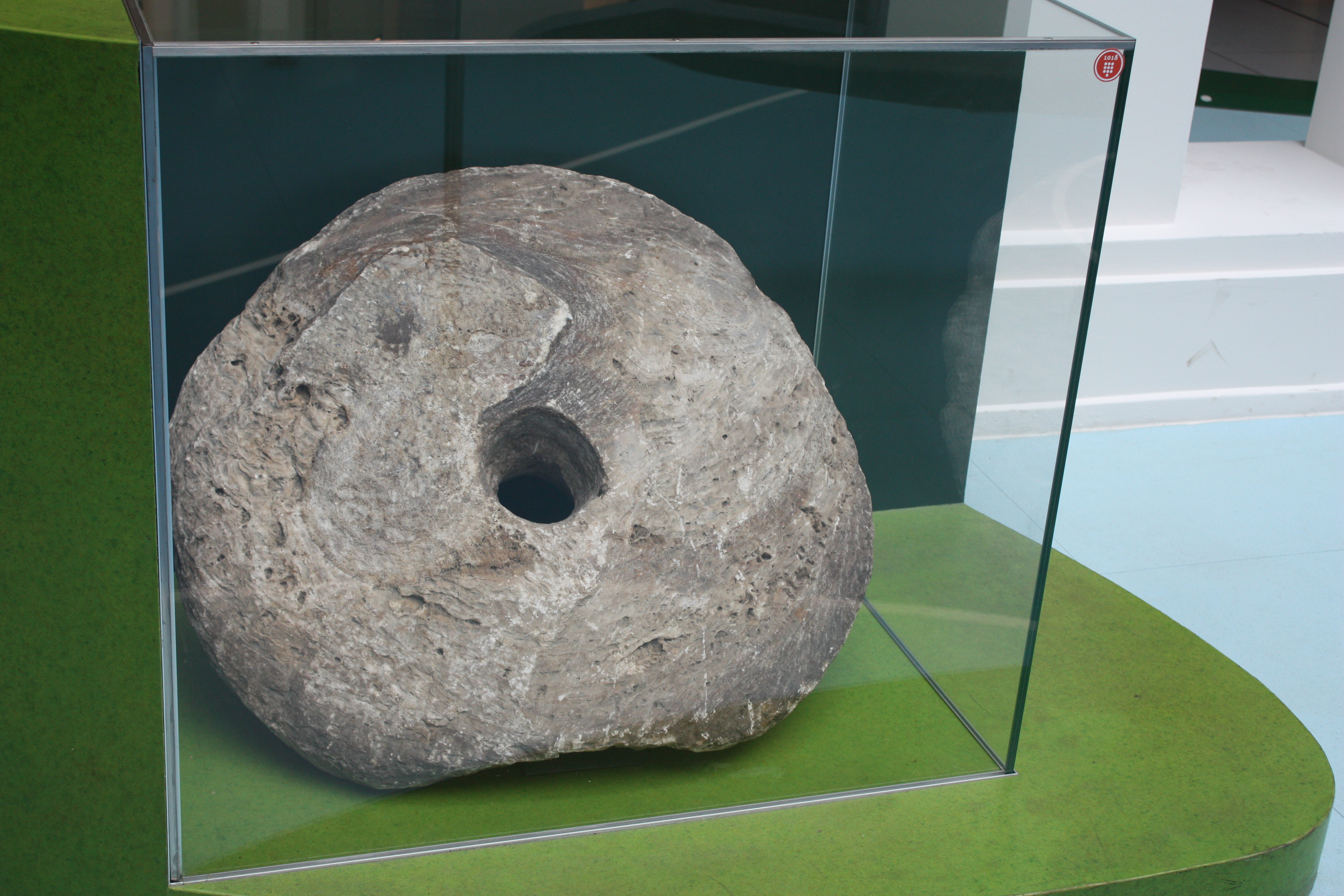
Rai stone in Bremen Museum

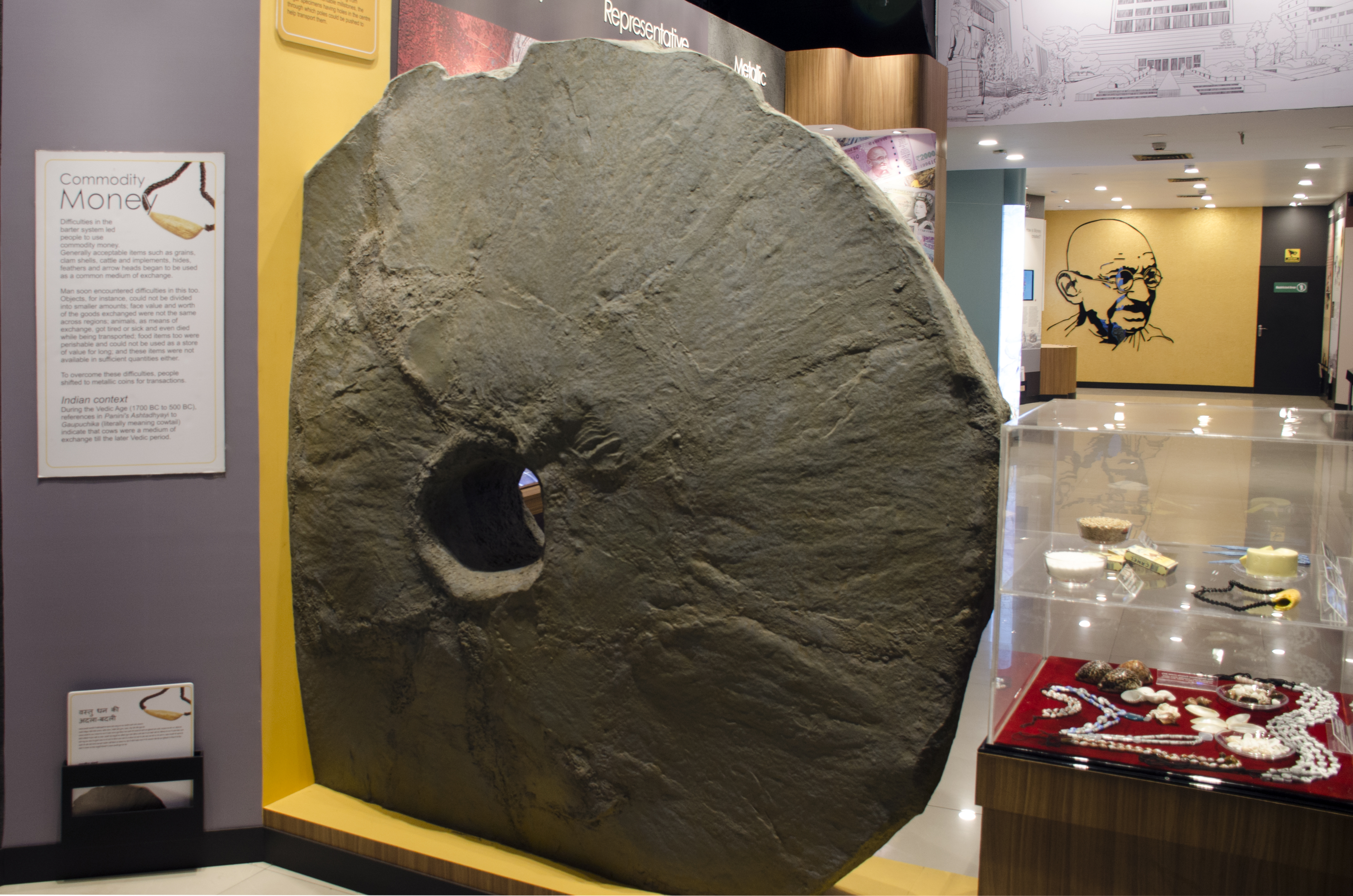
Rai stone on display at RBI Kolkata

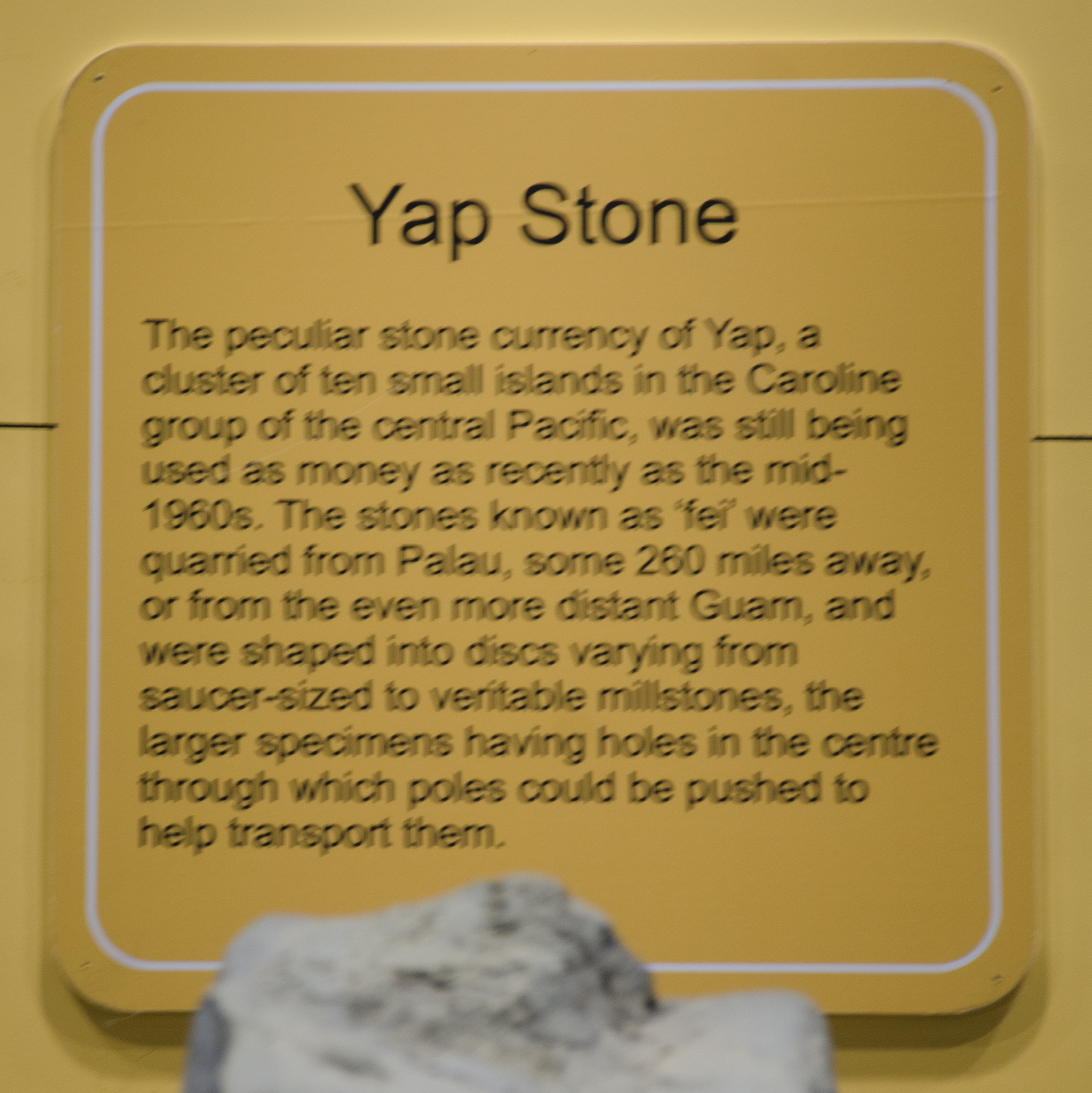
RBI Kolkata label
