= List of museums in the Marshall Islands =

The Republic of Marshall Islands has two museums:

- Alele Museum & Public Library
- Marshallese Cultural Center
