= National Gallery of Art (Honduras) =

Art museum in Honduras

- Galería Nacional de Arte
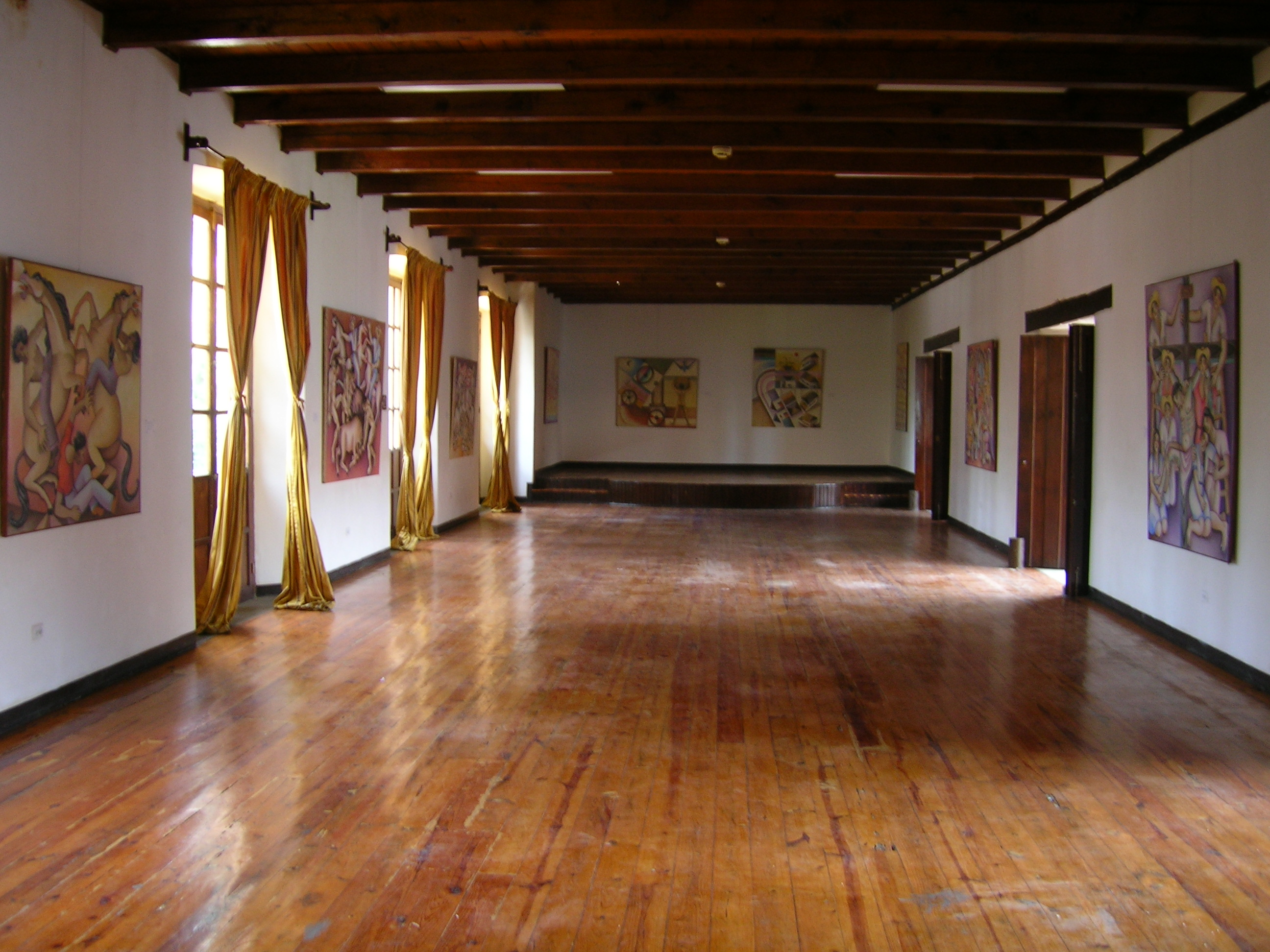
- Established: 31 July 1996; 29 years ago
- Location: Tegucigalpa, Honduras
- Coordinates: 14°06′14.90″N 87°12′16.35″W
- Type: Art museum
- Website: galerianacionalhonduras.org

The Honduran National Gallery of Art (Spanish: Galería Nacional de Arte, GNA) is an art museum in Tegucigalpa, Honduras. The Gallery was first opened on 31 July 1996. It is open to the public and as of 2019 was receiving 40,000 monthly visitors.

== History ==
The National Gallery is led by the Foundation for Arts and Culture (Spanish: Fundación Pro Arte y Cultura), which was founded in 1994. The Gallery opened to the public on 31 July 1996. In 2012 it was renovated with the help of the IHAH and the Universidad Nacional Autónoma de Honduras, and it reopened in 2013.

On 16 July 2015, a branch of the Gallery opened in San Pedro Sula. The sculpture garden of the Gallery was opened in 2017, displaying work by 25 Honduran sculptors.
