= Mali =

Country in West Africa

Republic of Mali
ߡߊ߬ߟߌ ߞߊ ߝߊߛߏߖߊߡߊߣߊ
(in official languages)
Bambara	ߡߊ߬ߟߌ ߞߊ ߝߊߛߏߖߊߡߊߣߊ; Mali ka Fasojamana
Fula	𞤈𞤫𞤨𞤵𞤦𞤤𞤭𞤳 𞤦𞤵 𞤃𞤢𞥄𞤤𞤭; Republik bu Maali
Hassaniyya	جُمْهُورِيَّةْ مَالِي; Jumhūriyet Māli
Koyraboro Senni Songhai	Mali Laamaa
Soninke	Mali Tɔgɔbadugu
Tamasheq	ⵜⴰⴳⴷⵓⴷⴰ ⵏ ⵎⴰⵍⵉ; Tagduda n Mali
- Flag Emblem
- Motto: Un peuple, un but, une foi (French) ߡߐߜߐ ߞߋߟߋߣ߸ ߟߊߢߌߣߌ ߞߋߟߋߣ߸ ߘߊߣߊߦߊ ߞߋߟߋߣ; Mɔgɔ kelen, laɲini kelen, dannaya kelen ("One people, one goal, one faith")
- Anthem: "Le Mali" (French) ("The Mali")
- Capital and largest city: Bamako; 12°39′N 8°0′W
- Official languages: 13 national languages: Bambara; Bobo; Hassaniya Arabic; Bozo; Dogon, Toro So; Fula; Kassonke; Maninke; Minyanka; Senufo, Senara; Songhay, Koyraboro Senni; Soninke; Tamasheq
- Spoken languages: Bambara (Note: Bambara serves as a lingua franca spoken by around 80% of the population.); Fula; Arabic; Soninke; Songhay; Mandinka; Minyanka; Tamasheq; Senufo; Bobo; Bozo; Kassonke; Samogo; Dafing; Dogon
- Working language: French (de facto)
- Ethnic groups (2022 Census): 35.9% Bambara; 12.8% Fula; 9.4% Senufo; 8.4% Malinke; 8.2% Soninke; 6.1% Dogon; 4.8% Songhai; 3.9% Tuareg; 2.2% Bobo / Bwa; 10.5% other
- Religion (2022 Census): 96.4% Islam; 2.3% Christianity; 0.7% traditional faiths; 0.5% no religion; 0.1% other religions
- Demonym: Malian
- Government: Unitary presidential republic under a military junta
  - President: Assimi Goita
  - Prime Minister: Abdoulaye Maïga (interim)
- Legislature: National Transitional Council

Formation
  - Establishment of the Sudanese Republic: 24 November 1958
  - Merger with Senegal to create the Mali Federation: 4 April 1959
  - Independence from France: 20 June 1960
  - Dissolution of the Mali Federation: 20 August 1960
  - Declaration of the Republic of Mali: 22 September 1960

Area
  - Total: 1,240,192 km^{2} (478,841 sq mi) (23rd)
  - Water (%): 1.6

Population
  - 2025 estimate: ▲25,200,000 (61st)
  - 2022 census: 22,395,489
  - Density: 18/km^{2} (46.6/sq mi) (215th)
- GDP (PPP): 2025 estimate
  - Total: ▲$72.74 billion (115th)
  - Per capita: ▲$2,930 (173rd)
- GDP (nominal): 2025 estimate
  - Total: ▲$23.21 billion (121st)
  - Per capita: ▲$936 (175th)
- Gini (2021): ▼35.7 medium inequality
- HDI (2023): ▲0.419 low (188th)
- Currency: West African CFA franc (XOF)
- Time zone: UTC±00:00 (GMT)
- Calling code: +223
- ISO 3166 code: ML
- Internet TLD: .ml

Mali, (Note: /ˈmɑːli/; Bambara pronunciation: [ma.li]: N'Ko script: ߡߊߟߌ) officially the Republic of Mali, (Note: Bambara: Mali ka Fasojamana, N'Ko script:) is a landlocked country in West Africa. It is the eighth-largest country in Africa and the 23rd largest country in the world, with an area of 1,240,192 square kilometres (478,841 sq mi). It is bordered to the north by Algeria, to the east by Niger, to the northwest by Mauritania, to the south by Burkina Faso and Ivory Coast, and to the west by Guinea and Senegal. The population is about 25.20 million, 47.19% of which are estimated to be under age 15 in 2024. Its capital and largest city is Bamako. The country has 13 official languages, with Bambara being the first one of the majority of the population.

Mali's northern borders reach deep into the middle of the Sahara Desert. Southern Mali, where the majority of inhabitants live, is in the Sudanian savanna and has the Niger and Senegal rivers running through it. The economy centres on agriculture and mining with its most prominent natural resources including gold (which represents 80% of its exports) and cotton. Mali is one of the poorest and least developed countries in the world.

Mali was part of three successive powerful and wealthy West African empires that controlled trans-Saharan trade: the Ghana Empire, the Mali Empire, and the Songhai Empire. At its peak in 1300, the Mali Empire was the wealthiest country in Africa with Emperor Mansa Musa believed to be one of the wealthiest individuals in history. Besides being a hub of trade and mining, medieval Mali was a centre of Islam, culture and knowledge, with Timbuktu becoming a renowned place of education. The Songhai Empire absorbed the Mali Empire in 1468, followed by a Saadian army which defeated the Songhai in 1591.

In the late 19th century, during the Scramble for Africa, France seized control of Mali, making it a part of French Sudan; as the Sudanese Republic, a brief federation with Senegal was formed, achieving independence in 1960. After Senegal's withdrawal, the Republic of Mali was established. After a long period of one-party rule, a coup in 1991 led to a new constitution and the establishment of Mali as a democratic, multi-party state. From this, Mali experienced economic growth and increased civil liberties, though this began to reverse after 2012. Since independence, there have been four rebellions involving Tuareg people, which occurred from 1962 to 1964, 1990 to 1995, 2007 to 2009, and since 2012.

In January 2012, an armed conflict broke out in northern Mali, in which Tuareg rebels took control of territory in the north, and in April declared the secession of a new state, Azawad. The conflict was complicated by a military coup in March 2012 and later fighting between Tuareg and other rebel factions. In response to territorial gains, the French military launched Operation Serval in January 2013. A month later, Malian and French forces partially recaptured the north, though the conflict continued.

Ibrahim Boubacar Keïta was elected president in 2013, but allegations of fraud during the 2020 parliamentary election led to mass protests. Keïta was removed in a coup led by Assimi Goita, who established himself as the military ruler of Mali after another coup in 2021. In 2025, all political parties were dissolved, and Goita was granted a five-year presidential term, renewable without elections. The Jama'at Nusrat al-Islam wa al-Muslimin (JNIM) imposed a fuel blockade on major cities, causing economic disruption and in 2026 launched a joint offensive with Tuareg separatists.

== Etymology ==
The name Mali is taken from the name of the Mali Empire. Originally meaning "hippopotamus", the clanic symbol of the Keita Dynasty, it eventually came to mean "the place where the king lives". Fourteenth-century Maghrebi traveller Ibn Battuta reported that the capital of the empire was called Mali. One Mandinka tradition tells that the legendary first emperor Sundiata Keita changed himself into a hippopotamus upon his death in the Sankarani River and that it was possible to find villages in the area of this river called "old Mali". A study of Malian proverbs notes that in old Mali, there is a village called Malikoma, which means "New Mali", and that Mali could have formerly been the name of a city.

Another theory suggests that Mali is a Fulani pronunciation of the name of the Mande peoples. It is suggested that a sound shift led to the change, whereby in Fulani the alveolar segment /nd/ shifts to /l/ and the terminal vowel denasalizes and raises, leading "Manden" to shift to /mali/.

== History ==
=== Historiography ===
The history of Mali has traditionally been studied using archaeology, oral traditions, and Arabic-language chronicles. Among the written sources from outside visitors are references to "Pene" and "Malal" in the work of al-Bakri in 1068, the story of the conversion of an early ruler, known to Ibn Khaldun (by 1397) as Barmandana, and a few geographical details in the work of al-Idrisi.

However, between 1013 and 1489 CE, there are also many hundreds of inscriptions from Gao-Saney, Gao, Essouk, Junhan, and Bentyia, which have received less scholarly attention. The Gao(-Saney) inscriptions contain poetry, and also provide contemporary primary-source documentation for many generations of kings and queens in the form of epitaphs.

Other contemporary written sources include a letter from Askia Muhammad I, quoted extensively in al-Maghili's (d. 1505 CE) response to the letter. This includes many details about 15th-century social and economic history, such as information about inheritance, pre-Islamic religious practices, and gender relations between men and women.

Muḥammad al-Kābarī was a black scholar from Kabara, which was a well-known centre of Islamic studies in West Africa by the fourteenth century. He was the earliest notable scholar in Timbuktu, in the 15th century. He wrote The Garden of Benefits and Advantages (Bustān al-Fawāʾid wa l-Manafiʿ), gathering knowledge that circulated among West African scholars at the time, including healing remedies and prayers.

The sources above call into question claims that there are no surviving indigenous written records that date from before the middle of the 17th century.

=== Prehistory ===
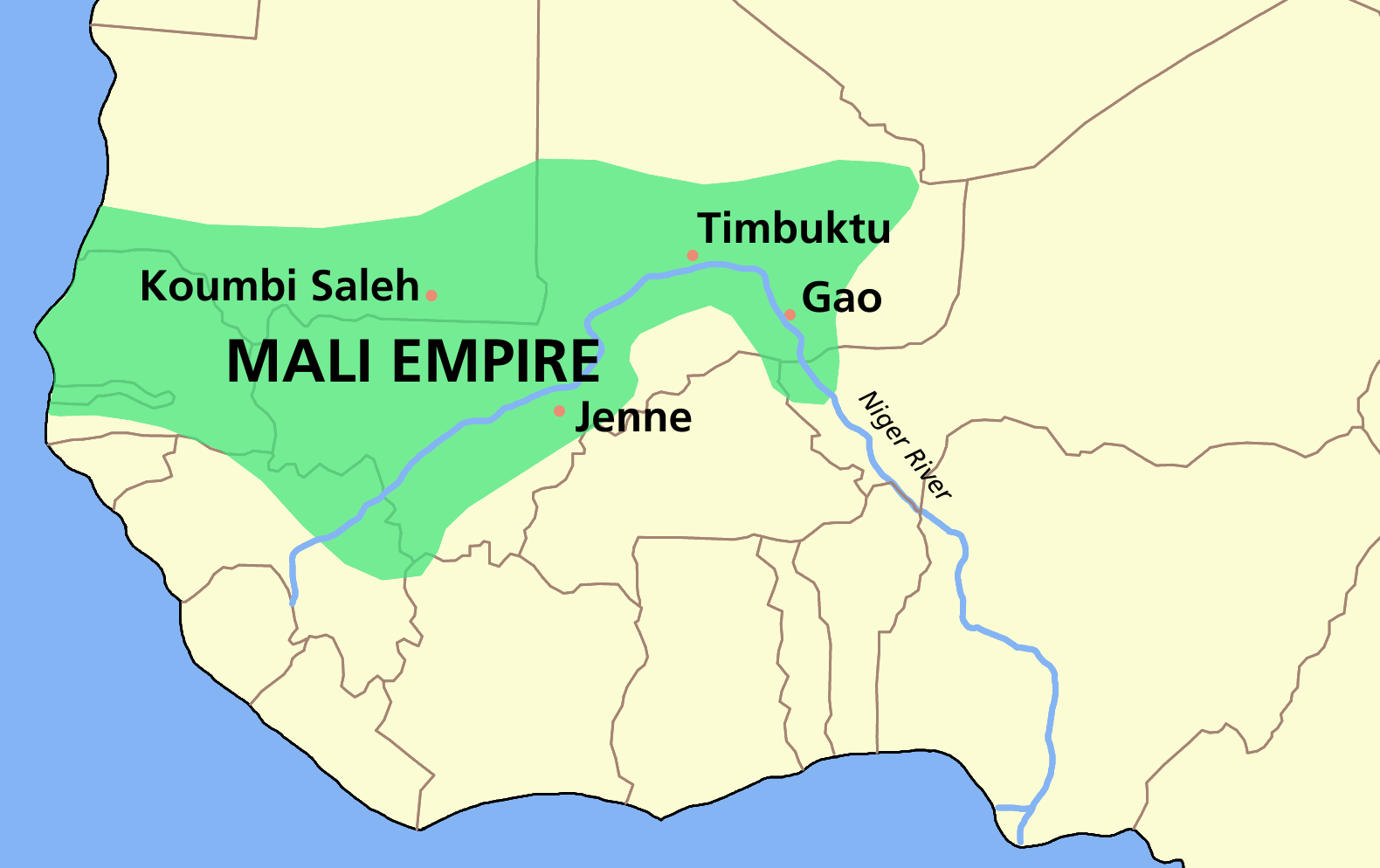
The extent of the Mali Empire's peak

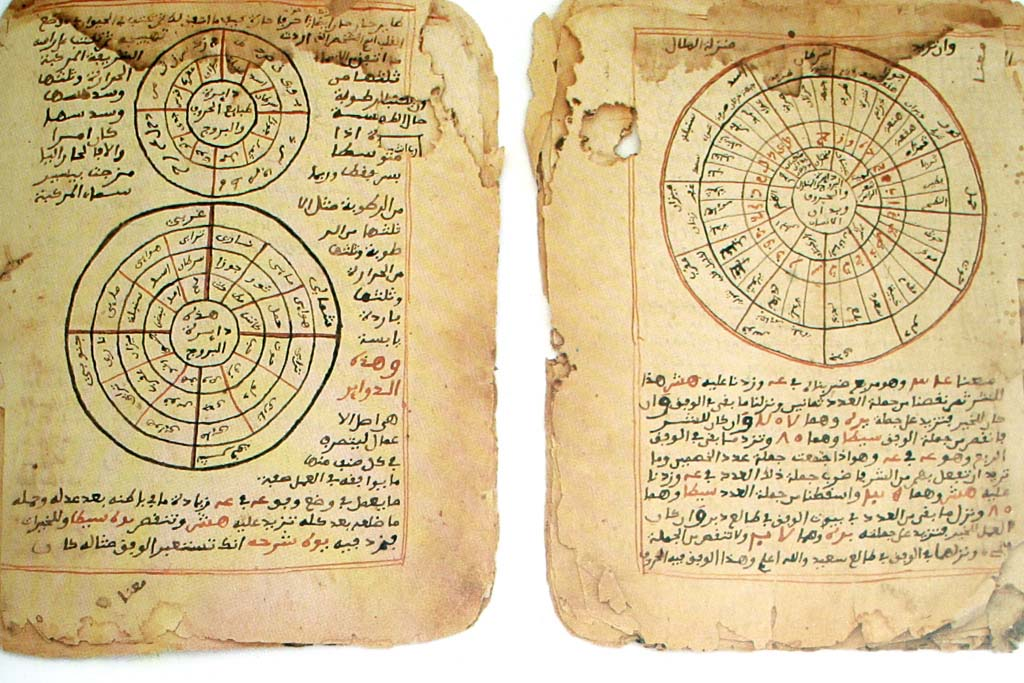
The pages above are from Timbuktu Manuscripts written in Sudani script (a form of Arabic) from the Mali Empire showing established knowledge of astronomy and mathematics. Today there are close to a million of these manuscripts found in Timbuktu alone.

Rock art in the Sahara suggests that northern Mali has been inhabited since 10,000 BC, when the Sahara was fertile and rich in wildlife. Early ceramics have been discovered at the central Malian site of Ounjougou dating to about 9,400 BC, and are believed to represent an instance of the independent invention of pottery in the region. Farming took place by 5000 BC, and iron was used by around 500 BC. In the first millennium BC, early cities and towns were created by Mandé peoples related to the Soninke people, along the middle Niger River, including Dia which began from around 900 BC, and reached its peak around 600 BC, and Djenné-Djenno, which lasted from around 300 BC to 900 AD. Through approximately 6th century BC and 4th century BC, the lucrative trans-Saharan trade in pack animals, gold, salt and slaves had begun, facilitating the rise of West Africa's great empires.

=== Rise of Islam ===
The Keita dynasty have claimed to have been descended from a man called "Lawalo", whom Niane claim was one of the sons of Bilal, the faithful muezzin of Islam's prophet Muhammad. The original epos, however, tends to portray Sundiata as a powerful sorcerer and hunter, rather than a devout Muslim. Religious life in the Mali Empire was divided between animist and Islamic belief systems, but the boundary was blurry and porous, if existent at all. The northern parts of the empire towards Sahara desert tended to be more Islamicised, while traditional African religion dominated in the south.

Mali was once part of three famed West African empires which controlled trans-Saharan trade in gold, salt, other precious commodities, and slaves majorly during the 14th century reign of Mansa Musa. These Sahelian kingdoms had neither rigid geopolitical boundaries nor rigid ethnic identities. The earliest of these empires was the Ghana Empire, which was dominated by the Soninke, a Mande-speaking people. The empire expanded throughout West Africa from the 8th century until 1078, when it was conquered by the Almoravids.

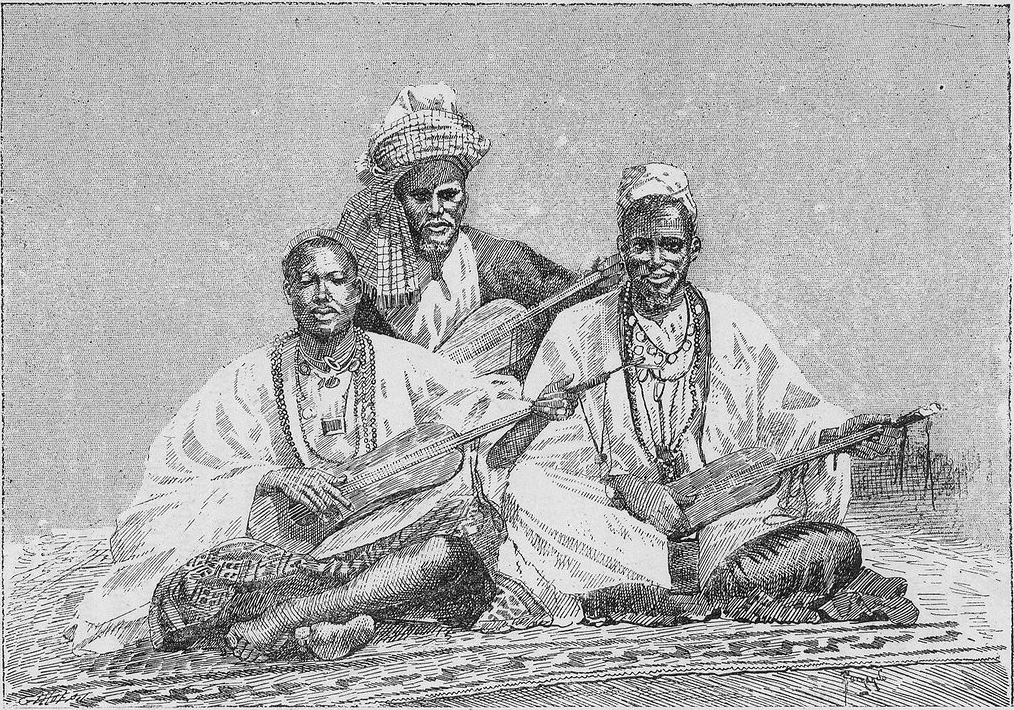
Griots of Sambala, king of Médina (Fula people, Mali), 1890. Photo by Joannès Barbier.

The Battle of Kirina in 1235 culminated in a victory for the Mandinka under the command of the exiled prince Sundiata Keita, which led to the downfall of the Sosso Empire.

=== Mali Empire ===
The Mali Empire formed on the upper Niger River and reached its height of power in the 14th century. Following the death of Sundiata Keita, in c. 1255, the kings or emperors of Mali were referred to by the title mansa. Largely due to its decentralised nature, the empire covered a larger area for a longer period of time than any other West African state before or since. Joseph Ki-Zerbo states that the farther from the capital, the more decentralised the mansa's power became.

Djenné and Timbuktu were centers of both trade and Islamic learning. A written primary source is In the late 14th century, the Songhai gradually gained independence from the Mali Empire and expanded, ultimately subsuming the entire eastern portion of the Mali Empire. The Songhai Empire's eventual collapse was largely the result of the Moroccan invasion of 1591 under the command of Judar Pasha. The fall of the Songhai Empire marked the end of the region's role as a trading crossroads. Following the establishment of sea routes by the European powers, the trans-Saharan trade routes lost significance. At that time, the Mali Empire's abundance in wealth expanded its commercial assets of salt and gold. Most of the empire consisted of autonomous kingdoms of communities who recognised the Mansa's ultimate authority and paid tribute. Leo Africanus made note of their professors and regarded Malians as "the most civilised, most intelligent, and most highly regarded of the blacks."

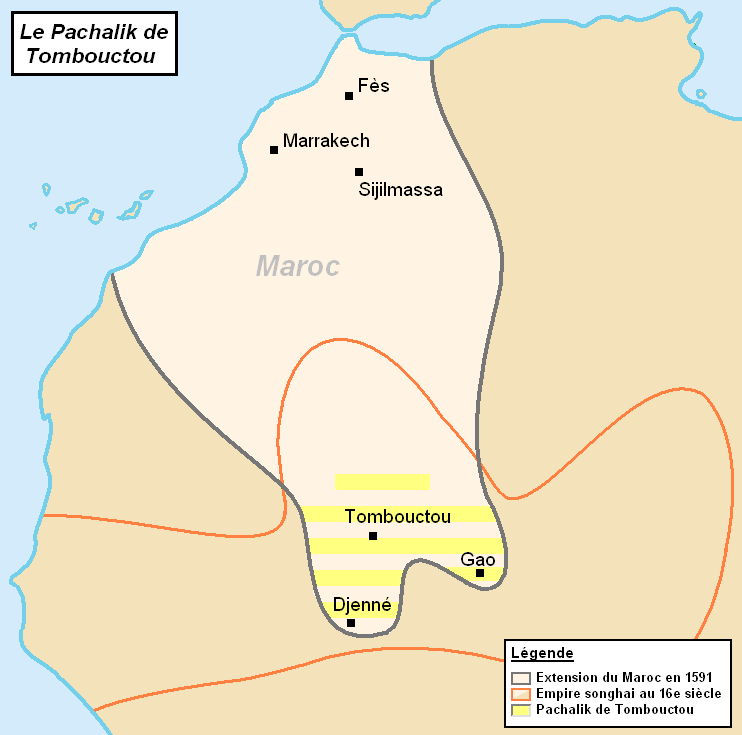
Map of the Pashalik of Timbuktu (yellow-striped) as part of the Saadi dynasty of Morocco (outlined black) within the Songhai Empire (outlined red), c. 1591

Some of the worst famines in the region's recorded history occurred in the 17th and 18th centuries. According to John Iliffe, "The worst crises were in the 1680s, when famine extended from the Senegambian coast to the Upper Nile and 'many sold themselves for slaves, only to get a sustenance', and especially in 1738–1756, when West Africa's greatest recorded subsistence crisis, due to drought and locusts, reportedly killed half the population of Timbuktu."

=== French colonisation ===
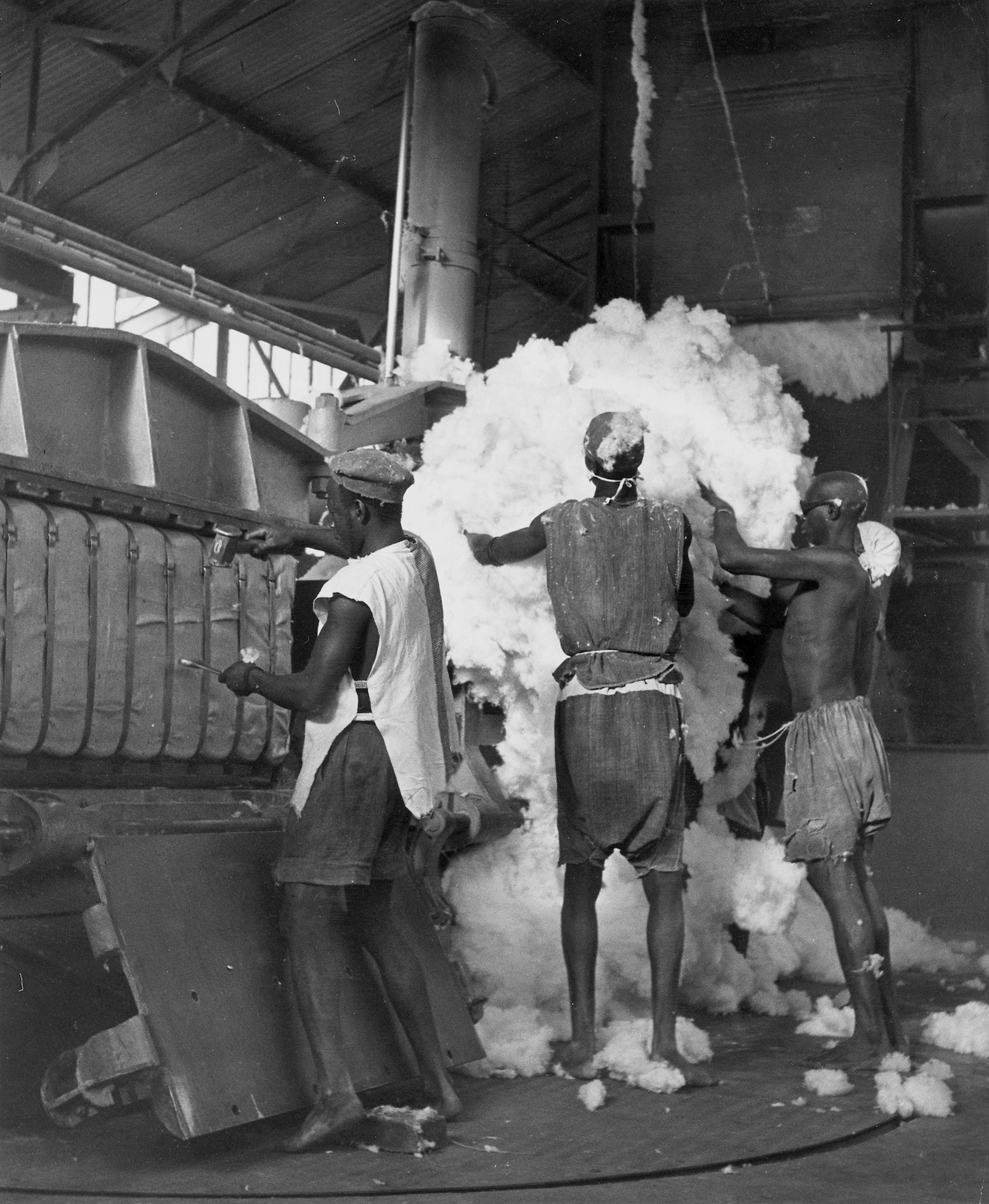
Cotton being processed in Niono into 180 kg (400 lb) bales for export to other parts of Africa and to France, c. 1950

Mali fell under the control of France during the Scramble for Africa in the late 19th century. By 1905, most of the area was under firm French control as a part of French Sudan. In November 1915 a large anti-French uprising broke out among the tribes. French colonial troops destroyed over 100 villages, and the last resistance was suppressed by September 1916. On 24 November 1958, French Sudan (which changed its name to the Sudanese Republic) became an autonomous republic within the French Community. In January 1959, Mali and Senegal united to become the Mali Federation.

The Mali Federation gained independence from France on 20 June 1960. Senegal withdrew from the federation in August 1960, which allowed the Sudanese Republic to become the independent Republic of Mali on 22 September 1960, the country's Independence Day.

=== Independence and Keïta regime ===
Modibo Keïta was elected the first president. He quickly established a one-party state, adopted an socialist orientation with close ties to the East, and nationalised large parts of the economy.

The only legal political party became the Sudanese Union – African Democratic Rally (Union Soudanaise – Rassemblement Démocratique Africain, US-RDA). Those who tried to create a political opposition were arrested and sentenced. Prior to independence, Keïta and the US-RDA campaigned against colonial and authoritarian rule, advocating for a democratic system in its place. This, however, did not happen and rather it became a Marxist-Leninist state. Keïta adapted the Marxist-Leninist ideology for African socialism, moving past the development of capitalism and instead opting for immediate strict control over foreign investments and involvement in the economy.

The government introduced a national civil service programme, service civique rural, to help the development of Mali as a socialist and self-sustaining independent country. The service targeted men in rural Mali aged 18–21 and in the early 1960s—when almost 60% of Mali's population was under age 25—had assembled around 40,000 young men. The national civil service outlined a 2-year programme of education and training to prepare the men for the handling of their own duties in their communities as peasant farmers. As part of the programme, men were taught methods of modern agriculture while working on state owned farms, and they took lessons in literacy and were taught the socialist values that the Malian government expected from them. The programme saw the use of young people as labourers for the state which led to significant desertions and a declining number recruited. Some people saw comparisons between the national civil service and forced labour under colonial rule. A 1962 report from The International Labour Organization deems the national service scheme unlawful as it did not follow the Forced Labour Convention that had made it illegal in 1957. Another report from 1962 states that the Malian government had submitted only 1 of 11 annual reports to the Committee of Experts on the Application of Conventions and Recommendations regarding labour conventions that had been signed and ratified by Mali previously.

At the time of independence, 93% were illiterate in French, 90% illiterate in Arabic, and very few people were given a Western education. Those who did receive a Western education were part of the elites after independence. France used education in Mali to create an elite loyal to France and for the exploitation of people and resources. In 1964 the government passed the Educational Reform Law which introduced 9 years of mandatory education across Mali. By 1964 the number of school-age Malians in education had more than tripled the pre-independence numbers with 24% in school and the number of people in secondary education had increased from 434 students in 1962-1963 to 1,325 by 1966-1967. Keïta had support from the Soviet Union in improving education, founding the Higher Administrative School of Bamako, the first institution of higher education in Mali, and created education centres for agriculture and medicine. Education was used to promote socialist ideology and was adapted to fit the national aims of Keïta's economic and political policies. The education system was changed to focus on African history, culture, and needs rather than that of France. Teaching materials focused on African socialism were introduced in schools. Despite the increases in the number of people in education, numbers were still restricted due to the lack of teachers and resources.

In 1962 Keïta created the Bank of the Republic of Mali which was responsible for minting its own currency, the Malian franc. Keïta believed that Mali having its own currency was a sign of sovereignty, stating in a speech "political power is always and necessarily accompanied by the sovereign right of minting money, that monetary power is inseparable from national sovereignty". It was revealed that the Malian franc would be equal to the CFA franc, the currency used in the Franc zone. The Franc zone was created by France for continued monetary influence over former French colonies. Nationalising the banking industry gave the Malian government more control, reducing economic dependence and influence from foreign countries including France. Protestors of the Malian franc were arrested and sent to prison. Throughout the 1960s, inflation increased, the economy declined, and so the Malian franc in 1967 was devalued by 50% against the CFA franc to prevent further inflation rates and further economic decline. In December 1967, Keïta announced an agreement between Mali and France that would later lead to Mali's re-entry into the West African Economic and Monetary Union in 1984.

Opposition and critics of the regime were met with violence and imprisonment. Political opponents of the government were arrested, and some were sent to Kidal, a desert town in northern Mali, and imprisoned there. Fily Dabo Sissoko, who founded the Sudanese Progressive Party as a political opponent of the US-RDA, was imprisoned in Kidal and died there, supposedly under the orders of Keïta, though this is not confirmed.

Keïta oversaw the nationalisation of various sectors of the economy to help the development of Mali as a socialist state. To further control the economy and the development of industrialisation, Keïta created state-owned enterprises. These enterprises spanned across different industries including textiles, food processing, tobacco, cotton, and radio manufacturing. On 19 November 1968, following progressive economic decline, the Keïta regime was overthrown in a bloodless military coup led by Moussa Traoré, a day which is now commemorated as Liberation Day.

=== Traoré regime, 1968-1991 ===
The subsequent military-led regime, with Traoré as president, attempted to reform the economy. His efforts were frustrated by political turmoil and a devastating drought from 1968 to 1974, in which famine killed thousands of people. The Traoré regime faced student unrest beginning in the late 1970s and three coup attempts. The Traoré regime repressed all dissenters until the late 1980s.

WWI Commemorative Monument to the "Armée Noire"

Opposition to the corrupt and dictatorial regime grew during the 1980s. During this time strict programs, imposed to satisfy demands of the International Monetary Fund, brought increased hardship upon the people, while elites close to the government supposedly lived in growing wealth. The government continued to attempt economic reforms, and the populace became increasingly dissatisfied. The late 1980s saw limited political liberalisation far from a full-fledged democratic system.

In 1990, cohesive opposition movements began to emerge and was complicated by the turbulent rise of ethnic violence in the north following the return of many Tuaregs who had migrated to Algeria and Libya during the drought. Peaceful student protests in January 1991 were brutally suppressed, with mass arrests and torture of leaders and participants. Scattered acts of rioting and vandalism of public buildings followed, but most actions by the dissidents remained nonviolent.

In March 1991, mass pro-democracy rallies and a nationwide strike was held in both urban and rural communities, which became known as les évenements ("the events") or the March Revolution. In response to mass demonstrations organized by university students that were later joined by trade unionists and others, soldiers opened fire indiscriminately on the nonviolent demonstrators. Riots broke out briefly following the shootings. Barricades as well as roadblocks were erected, and Traoré declared a state of emergency and imposed a nightly curfew. Despite an estimated loss of 300 lives over the course of four days, nonviolent protesters continued to return to Bamako each day demanding the resignation of Traoré and the implementation of democratic policies.

By 26 March, the growing refusal of soldiers to fire into the largely nonviolent protesting crowds turned into a full-scale tumult. Military soldiers clashed with peaceful protesters, resulting in the massacre of dozens under the orders of Traoré. That afternoon, Lieutenant Colonel Amadou Toumani Touré announced on the radio that he had arrested Traoré. He and three associates were tried, convicted and received the death sentence for their role in this massacre. The date is now a national holiday in Mali. The coup is remembered as the March Revolution of 1991.

=== Multi-party democracy ===
In 1992, a multi-party system was established, with a transitional government was formed and a national congress of civil and political groups met to draft a democratic constitution to be approved by a national referendum. In 1992, Alpha Oumar Konaré won Mali's first democratic, multi-party presidential election, and he was re-elected in 1997. Touré was elected in 2002. During this democratic period Mali was regarded as one of the most politically and socially stable countries in Africa.

Slavery persists in Mali today with as many as 200,000 people held in direct servitude to a master. In the Tuareg Rebellion of 2012, ex-slaves were a vulnerable population with reports of some slaves being recaptured by their former masters.

=== Northern Mali conflict ===
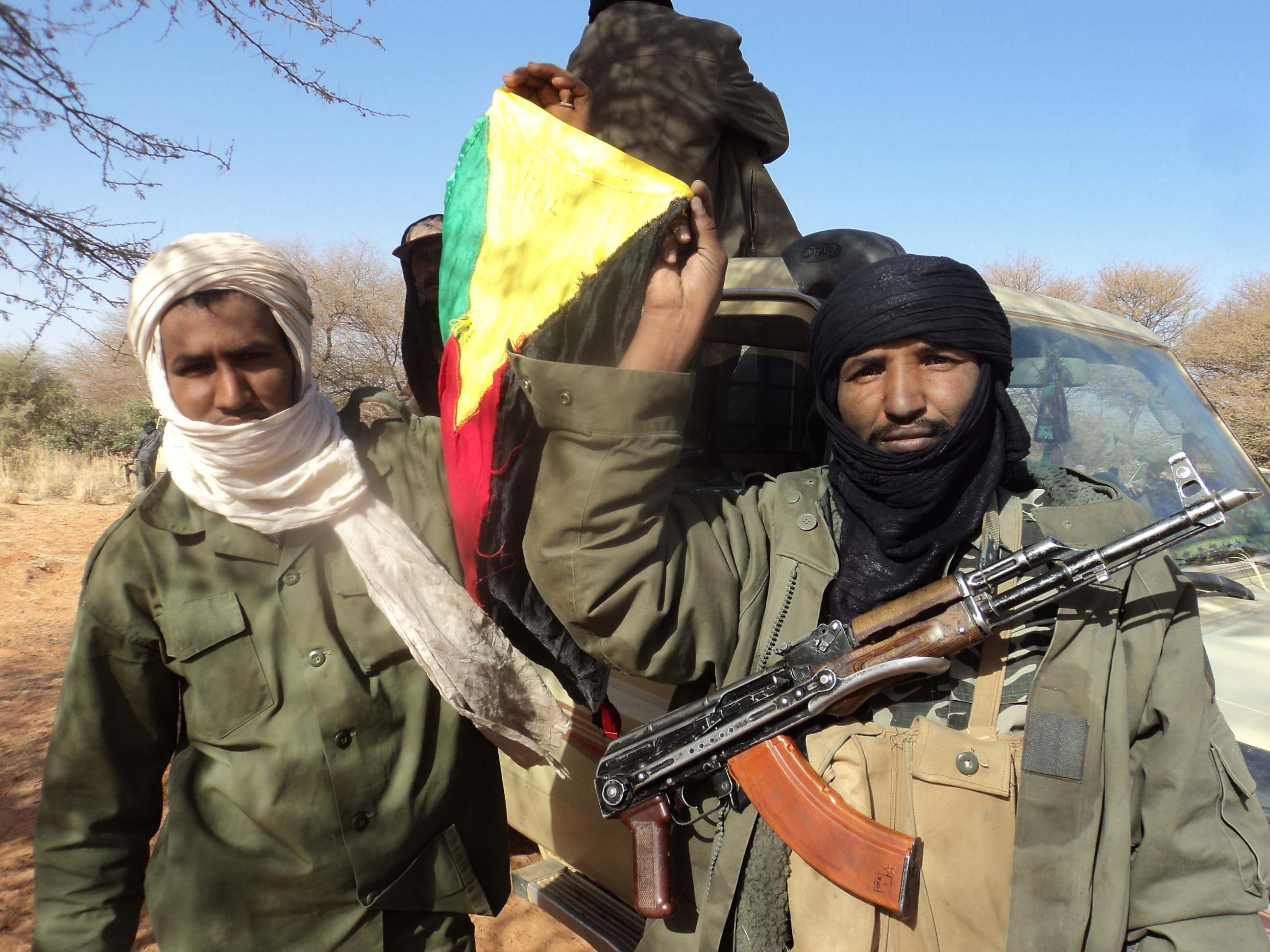
Tuareg separatist rebels in Mali, January 2012

In January 2012 a Tuareg rebellion began in northern Mali, led by the National Movement for the Liberation of Azawad (MNLA). In March, military officer Amadou Sanogo seized power in a coup d'état, citing Touré's failures in quelling the rebellion and leading to sanctions and an embargo by the Economic Community of West African States (ECOWAS). The MNLA quickly took control of the north, declaring its independence as Azawad. Islamist groups, including Ansar Dine and Al-Qaeda in the Islamic Maghreb, who had helped the MNLA defeat the government, turned on the Tuareg and took control of the north with the goal of implementing sharia in Mali.

On 11 January 2013, the French Armed Forces intervened at the request of the interim government of President Dioncounda Traoré. On 30 January, the coordinated advance of the French and Malian troops claimed to have retaken the last remaining Islamist stronghold of Kidal, which was also the last of three northern provincial capitals. On 2 February, French President François Hollande joined Traoré in a public appearance in recently recaptured Timbuktu.

Map showing the fullest extent of rebel-held territory in January 2013

In August 2013, Ibrahim Boubacar Keita was elected president of Mali in the second round of the election.

=== Conflict in central Mali ===
In Mopti Region, conflict has escalated since 2015 between agricultural communities like the Dogon and the Bambara, and the pastoral Fula people. Historically, the two sides had fought over access to land and water, factors exacerbated by climate change as the Fula move into new areas. The Dogon and the Bambara communitie accused the Fula of working with armed Islamists linked to al-Qaeda. While some Fula have joined Islamist groups, Human Rights Watch reports that the links had been exaggerated.

The conflict has seen the creation and growth of Dogon and Bambara militias. The government is suspected of supporting some of these groups under the guise of being proxies in the war against Islamists in the northern Mali conflict. The government denies this. One such militia is the Dogon group Dan Na Ambassagou, created in 2016.

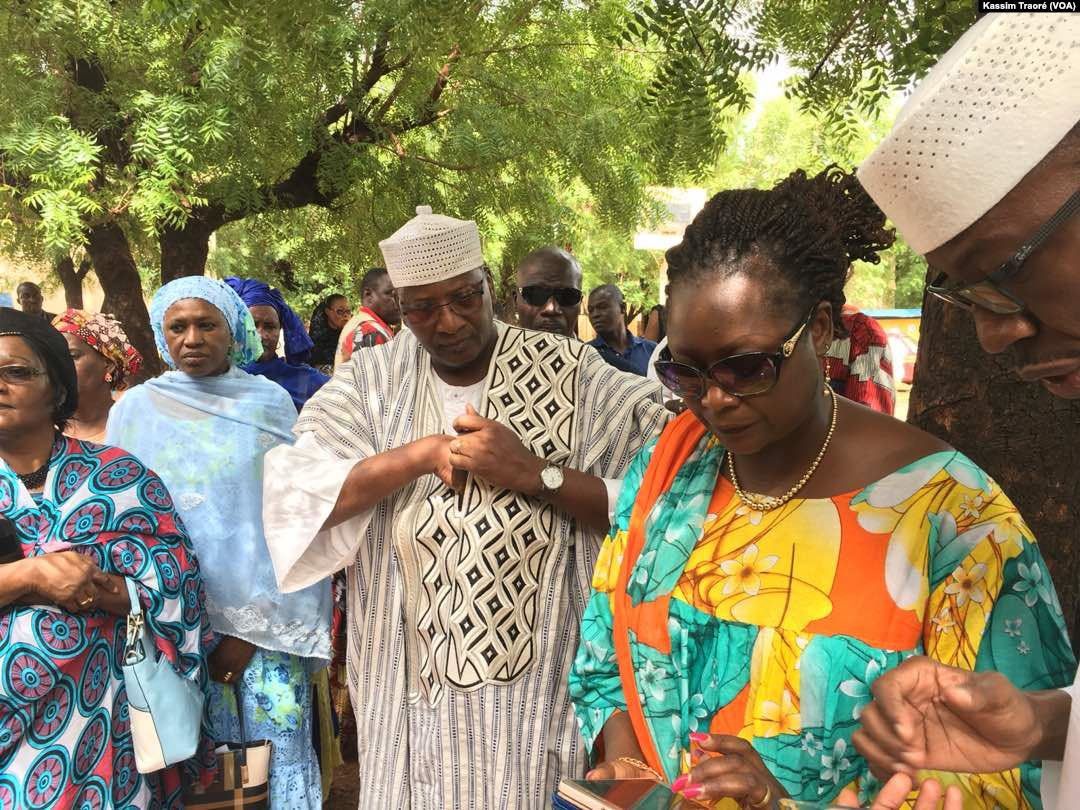
Modibo Sidibe voting in Bamako, 2018 Malian presidential election

In the 2018 Malian presidential election, no candidate received more than 50% of the vote in the first round. A runoff was held on 12 August 2018 between the top two candidates, incumbent president Ibrahim Boubacar Keïta of the Rally for Mali and Soumaïla Cissé of the Union for the Republic and Democracy, and Keïta was re-elected with 67% of the vote.

In September 2018, the Centre for Humanitarian Dialogue negotiated a unilateral ceasefire with Dan Na Ambassagou "in the context of the conflict which opposes the group to other community armed groups in central Mali". The group was blamed for the 24 March 2019 massacre of 160 Fula villagers; the group denied the attack, but Keïta ordered the group to disband. The UN Special Adviser on the Prevention of Genocide, Adama Dieng, warned of a growing ethnic resentments in the conflict. By 2020, more than 600,000 people had been displaced by the conflict. The United Nations reported that the number of children killed in the conflict in the first six months of 2019 was twice as many for the entire year of 2018. Many of the children have been killed in intercommunal attacks attributed to ethnic militias, with the majority of attacks occurring around Mopti. It is reported that around 900 schools have closed down and that armed militias are recruiting children.

In October 2019, two jihadist attacks in Boulikessi and Mondoro killed more than 25 Mali soldiers near the border with Burkina Faso. Keïta declared "no military coup will prevail in Mali", saying he does not think it "is on the agenda at all and cannot worry us". On 1 November 2019, the IS-GS militants killed at least 50 soldiers in the 2019 Indelimane attack in the Ménaka Region. In February 2020, Human Rights Watch documented atrocities against civilians in Central Mali and said that at least 456 civilians were killed, while hundreds were injured from January 2019 until November.

=== 2020s coups and Assimi Goita junta ===
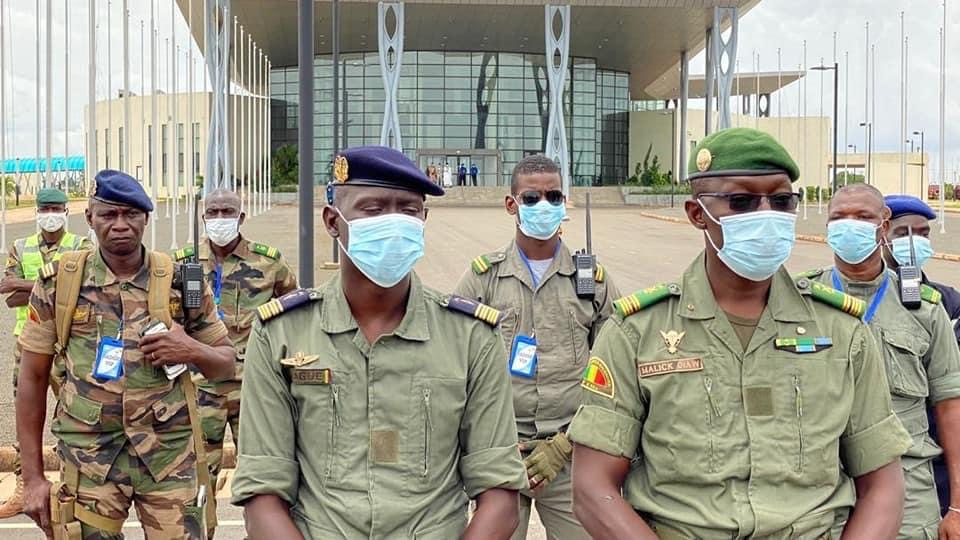
Members of the National Committee for the Salvation of the People, September 2020

Popular unrest began on 5 June 2020 following irregularities in the March and April parliamentary elections, including outrage against the kidnapping of opposition leader Soumaïla Cissé. Between 11 and 23 deaths followed protests that took place from 10 to 13 June. In July Keïta dissolved the constitutional court.

Members of the military led by Colonel Assimi Goita and Colonel-Major Ismaël Wagué in Kati, Koulikoro Region, began a mutiny on 18 August 2020. Keïta and Prime Minister Boubou Cissé were arrested, and shortly after midnight Keïta announced his resignation, saying he did not want to see any bloodshed. Wagué announced the formation of the National Committee for the Salvation of the People (CNSP) and promised elections in the future. A curfew was begun, and the streets of Bamako were quiet. ECOWAS condemned the coup and demanded that Keïta be reinstated as president.

In September 2020, the CNSP agreed to an 18-month political transition to civilian rule. Shortly after, Bah N'daw was named interim president by a group of 17 electors, with Goita being appointed vice president. The government was inaugurated on 25 September. In January 2021 the transitional government announced that the CNSP had been disbanded. Tensions between the civilian transitional government and the military ran high after the handover of power. The tensions came to a head on 24 May 2021 after a cabinet reshuffle, where two leaders of the 2020 military coup—Sadio Camara and Modibo Kone—were replaced by N'daw's administration. On 7 June Goita was sworn into office as interim president.

Military situation in Mali. For a detailed map, see here.

In 2022 and 2023, the Islamic State in the Greater Sahara saw major gains in the Mali War, occupying large swaths of territory in southeastern Mali. Ansongo and Tidermène were captured. By mid-2023, the militant group had doubled the amount of territory it controlled since the overthrow of the previous government and establishment of the junta.

On 10 January 2022, Mali announced the closure of its borders and recalled several ambassadors to ECOWAS countries in response to sanctions placed on Mali for deferring elections for four years. On 4 February, France's ambassador was expelled. According to Human Rights Watch, Malian troops and suspected Russian mercenaries from the Wagner Group executed around 300 civilian men in central Mali in March 2022. France had started withdrawing French troops from Mali in February 2022, commencing the end of Operation Barkhane. On 2 May, the military government announced breaking its defence accords concluded in 2013 with France, constituting an additional step in the deterioration of Malian–French relations. France considered the announcement as illegitimate. A UN panel reported that in the first three months of 2022, 543 civilians were killed and 269 wounded, warning the 2015 peace agreement between the government and pro-independence groups was threatened by a potential risk of confrontation for the first time in five years. The need for humanitarian assistance also increased.

In June 2023, Mali removed French as an official language with the approval of a new constitution by 97% of voters in a referendum conducted by the junta. In July 2024, CSP-DPA rebels and JNIM militants killed dozens of Russian mercenaries and Malian government forces during the Battle of Tinzaouaten. On 17 September 2024, al-Qaeda linked JNIM militants attacked several locations across Bamako, killing at least 77 people and injuring 255 others.

In 2025 JNIM began a strategy to blockade the government-controlled cities from foreign fuel imports and to cut them off from each other. Mali depends on foreign fuel imports, receiving 95% of its fuel from Senegal or Ivory Coast. JNIM attacks cut off connections to Mauritania and Senegal, and they were followed by similar attacks in the south near Ivory Coast and Guinea. JNIM imposed a blockade against cities in southern Mali, including Bamako, after the government had stopped fuel sales in rural areas. This increased fuel prices in the capital by 500% and led to economic disruption, lines at gas stations, school closures, and cancellations of flights from the Bamako International Airport. In early September the Malian truckers' union stopped operations for two weeks due to the dangerous conditions along roads in southern Mali, leaving 1,000 fuel trucks waiting in Ivory Coast. In October the U.S. Embassy advised American citizens to leave the country immediately because of increasing instability, and to do so by plane, because of "terrorist attacks along national highways". In April 2026, widespread unrest was reported from various locations across the country, apparently sponsored by a diverse range of rebel groups.

== Geography ==
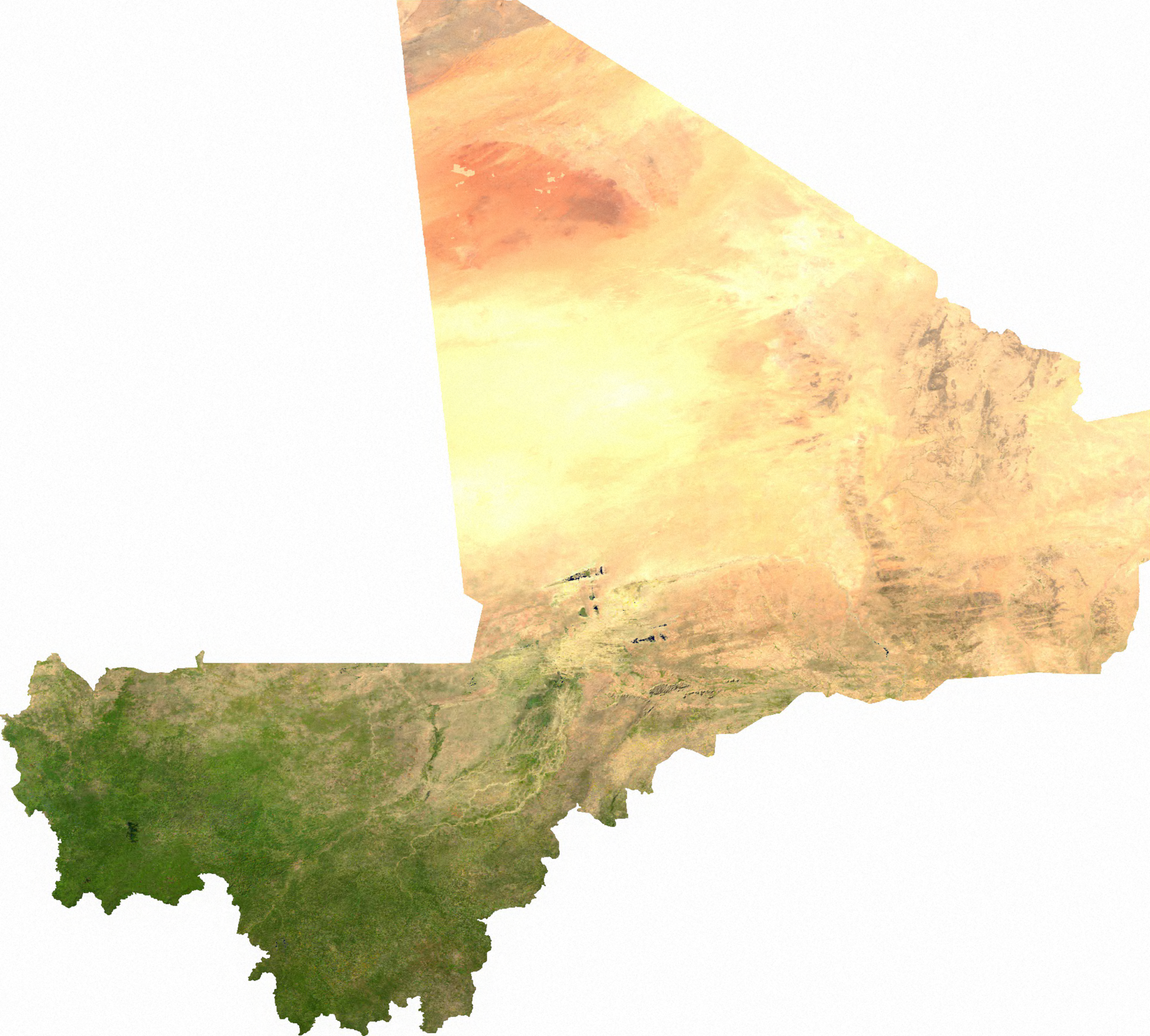
Satellite image of Mali

Mali is a landlocked country in West Africa. It lies between latitudes 10° and 25°N and longitudes 13°W and 5°E. Mali borders Algeria to the north-northeast, Niger to the east, Burkina Faso to the southeast, Ivory Coast to the south, Guinea to the south-west, and Senegal to the west and Mauritania to the north-west.

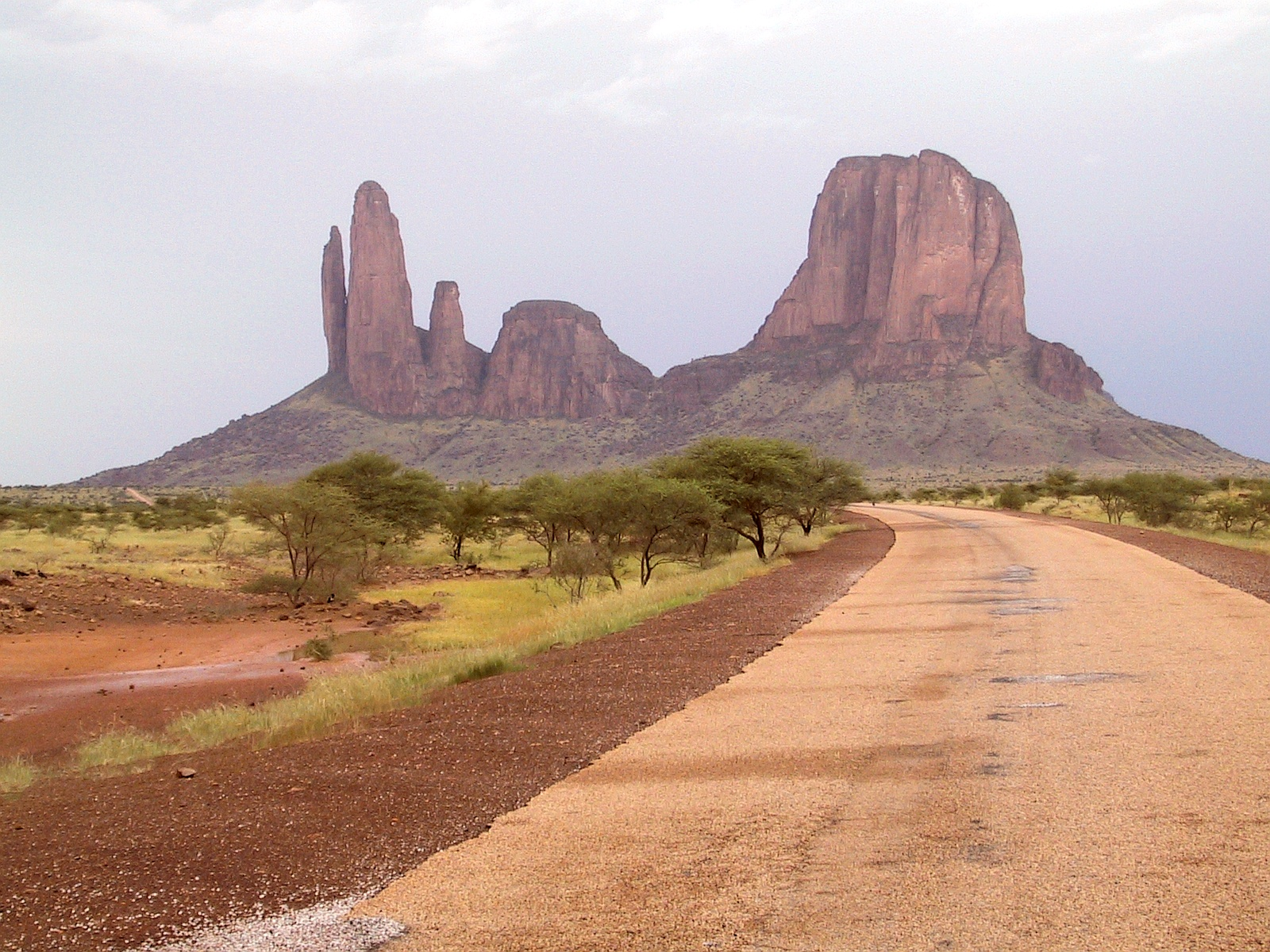
Landscape in Hombori

Mali map of Köppen climate classification

At 1,240,192 square kilometres (478,841 sq mi), Mali is the 24th-largest country in the world and the eighth-largest country in Africa. Most of the country lies in the southern Sahara Desert, which produces an extremely hot, dust-laden Sudanian savanna zone. Mali is mostly flat, rising to rolling northern plains covered by sand. The Adrar des Ifoghas massif lies in the northeast.

Mali lies in the torrid zone and is among the hottest countries in the world. The thermal equator (which matches the hottest spots year-round on the planet based on the mean daily annual temperature) crosses the country. Most of Mali receives negligible rainfall, and droughts are very frequent. Late April to early October is the rainy season in the south. During this time, flooding of the Niger River is common, creating the Inner Niger Delta. The vast northern desert has a hot desert climate (Köppen climate classification BWh) with long, extremely hot summers and scarce rainfall which decreases northwards. The central area has a hot semi-arid climate (Köppen climate classification BSh) with very high temperatures year-round, a long, intense dry season and a brief, irregular rainy season. The southern areas have a tropical wet and dry climate (Köppen climate classification Aw).

Mali has considerable natural resources, with gold, uranium, phosphates, kaolinite, salt and limestone being most widely exploited. Mali is estimated to have in excess of 17,400 tonnes of uranium (measured + indicated + inferred). In 2012, additional uranium deposits were identified in the north. Mali faces numerous environmental challenges, including desertification, deforestation, soil erosion, and inadequate supplies of potable water.

=== Biodiversity ===
Five terrestrial ecoregions lie within Mali's borders: Sahelian Acacia savanna, West Sudanian savanna, Inner Niger Delta flooded savanna, South Saharan steppe and woodlands, and West Saharan montane xeric woodlands. The country had a 2019 Forest Landscape Integrity Index mean score of 7.16/10, ranking it 51st globally out of 172 countries.

== Politics and government ==
=== Government ===
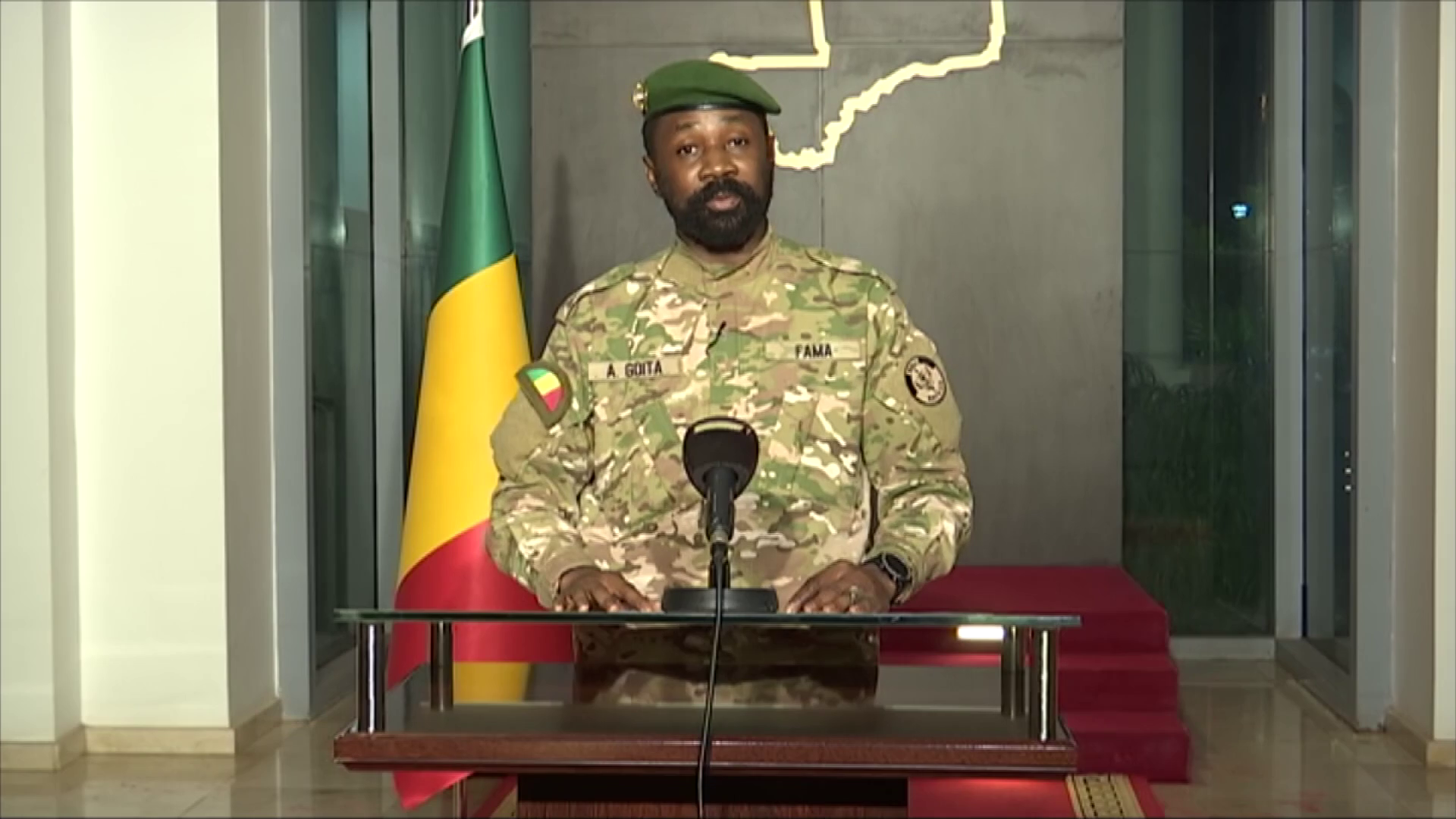
Assimi Goita, interim president of Mali since the 2021 Malian coup d'état

Mali is led by transitional President Assimi Goita, who is assisted by Prime Minister Abdoulaye Maïga, and the National Transitional Council that replaced the National Assembly following the 2020 coup. However, in practice, Goita and a military junta consisting of four other officers, the National Committee for the Salvation of the People, have complete control over the political system. The 1992 constitution established a Mali as a secular constitutional republic with a separation of powers between executive, legislative, and judicial branches, and identifies eight state institutions. These included the presidency; the government; the National Assembly; the Supreme, Constitutional, and High Courts; the High Council of Territorial Units; and the Economic, Social, and Cultural Council. The 1992 constitution was replaced by the junta with a new constitution on 22 July 2023.

The president, who is elected by universal suffrage for a five-year term that is renewable once, is the head of state that serves as the guardian of the constitution, the commander-in-chief of the armed forces, and appoints the prime minister and other government ministers. The prime minister is the head of government. The National Assembly of Mali was a unicameral legislature consisting of deputies elected by universal suffrage to a term of five years. It convened twice a year, or in extraordinary sessions called by the prime minister or the parliamentary majority. The transitional government pushed back the timetable for a new election, initially to be held in February 2022, to February 2024. In exchange for the government's commitment to a 2024 election, ECOWAS agreed to lift sanctions on the country. In July 2025 a law granted Goita a five-year term that is renewable indefinitely, and there are no immediate plans to hold elections.

The constitution provides for an independent judiciary, tasked with the application of the laws of the republic and the protection of civil liberties, which are guaranteed by both the 1992 and 2023 constitutions. Mali's highest courts are the Supreme Court, which has both judicial and administrative powers, and a separate Constitutional Court that provides judicial review of legislative acts and serves as an election arbiter. Various lower courts exist, though village chiefs and elders resolve most local disputes in rural areas. In practice, many of the freedoms that were gained during the development of democracy after 1991, and were relatively well respected, have been suppressed during the 2020s military junta. There is no real separation of powers, with the junta being dominant. Freedom of association, expression, and assembly are undermined by the transitional government, and members of the judiciary and civil service have been dismissed for criticizing the junta.

According to International IDEA's Global State of Democracy Indices and Democracy Tracker, Mali performs in the low range on overall democratic measures, with particular weaknesses in political representation and rule of law. The Economist Democracy Index classified Mali as an "authoritarian regime" in 2024, ranking it 139 out of the 167 countries that were evaluated. Freedom House describes Mali as "not free" in 2026. The Fragile States Index ranked Mali as the 14th most fragile country in the world, out of 179 countries, in 2024.

=== Foreign relations ===
The Alliance of Sahel States between Mali, Niger and Burkina Faso. It is anti-French, anti-neocolonialism and anti-ECOWAS, demonstrated with acts including the remotion of French as an official language in all three states in 2020s.

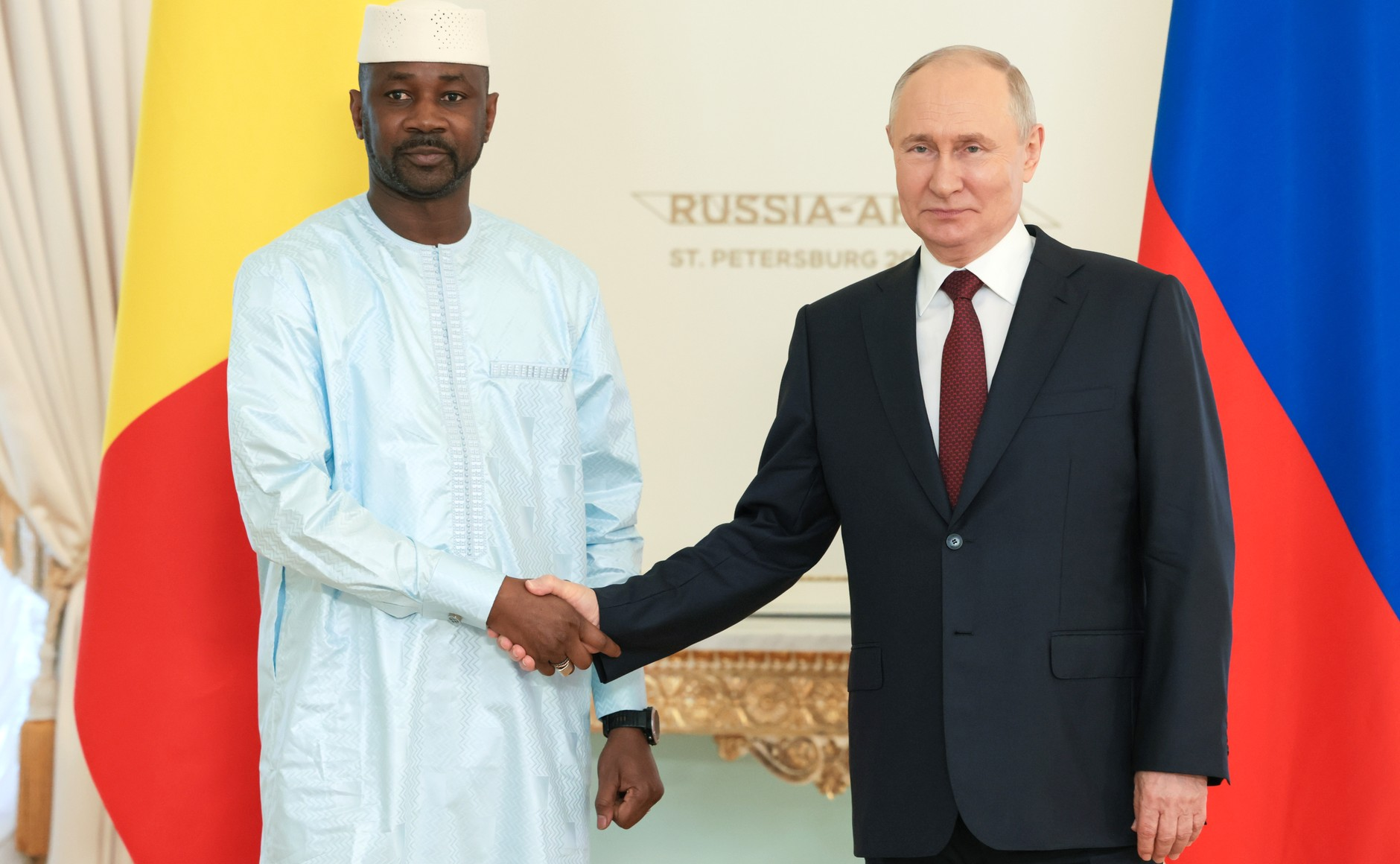
Assimi Goita with Russian President Vladimir Putin at the Russia–Africa Summit in St. Petersburg, July 2023

Until 2012, foreign policy orientation had become increasingly pragmatic and pro-Western over time. Starting from the 1990s, Mali's successive governments worked with the IMF to obtain debt relief, as well as to end the country's political and economic isolation. After the institution of a democratic form of government, relations with the West in general and with the United States in particular have improved significantly. Mali has a longstanding relationship with France. Mali was a member of the in African Union until its suspension over the 2012 coup d'état.

After the coups in 2020 and 2021, Mali took a more belligerent stance towards the UN, ECOWAS, and France. At the request of the government, France withdrew its troops from Mali in 2022, and the UN followed in 2023. The Alliance of Sahel States was formed in 2023 between Mali, Niger, and Burkina Faso after they experienced similar coups in the early 2020s. It is anti-French, anti-neocolonialism and anti-ECOWAS, demonstrated with acts including the removal of French as an official language in all three states. Mali ended its membership in ECOWAS in 2025. The country expanded its relationship with Russia, acquiring military equipment and assistance.

Working to control and resolve regional conflicts—such as in Ivory Coast, Liberia, and Sierra Leone—is one of its major foreign policy goals. Mali feels threatened by the potential for the spillover of conflicts in neighboring states, and relations with those neighbors are often uneasy. General insecurity along borders in the north, including cross-border banditry and terrorism, remain troubling issues in regional relations.

=== Military ===
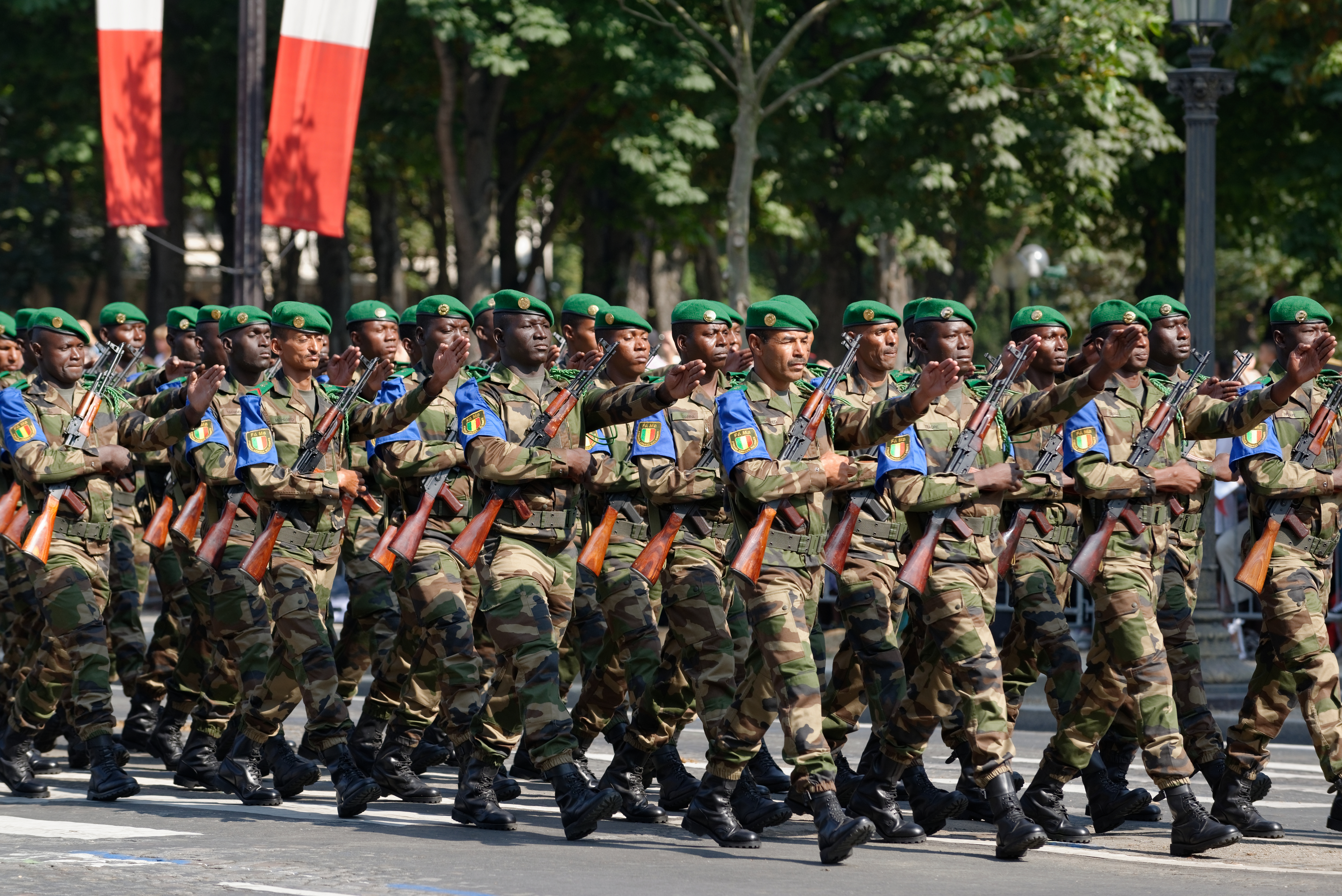
Malian soldiers at the 2013 Bastille Day parade in France

Mali has 41,000 troops in its military and paramilitary forces. These include the Malian Armed Forces which consist of an army and air force, numbering 19,000 and 2,000 personnel, respectively, as of 2025. The Gendarmerie includes eight paramilitary companies and an air transport group, while the National Guard has six camel cavalry companies and a special forces anti-terrorism unit. The military is under-equipped and has a limited capability for the manufacturing and maintenance of equipment.

Russia's Africa Corps has between 1,500 and 3,500 troops across Mali.

=== Territorial units ===
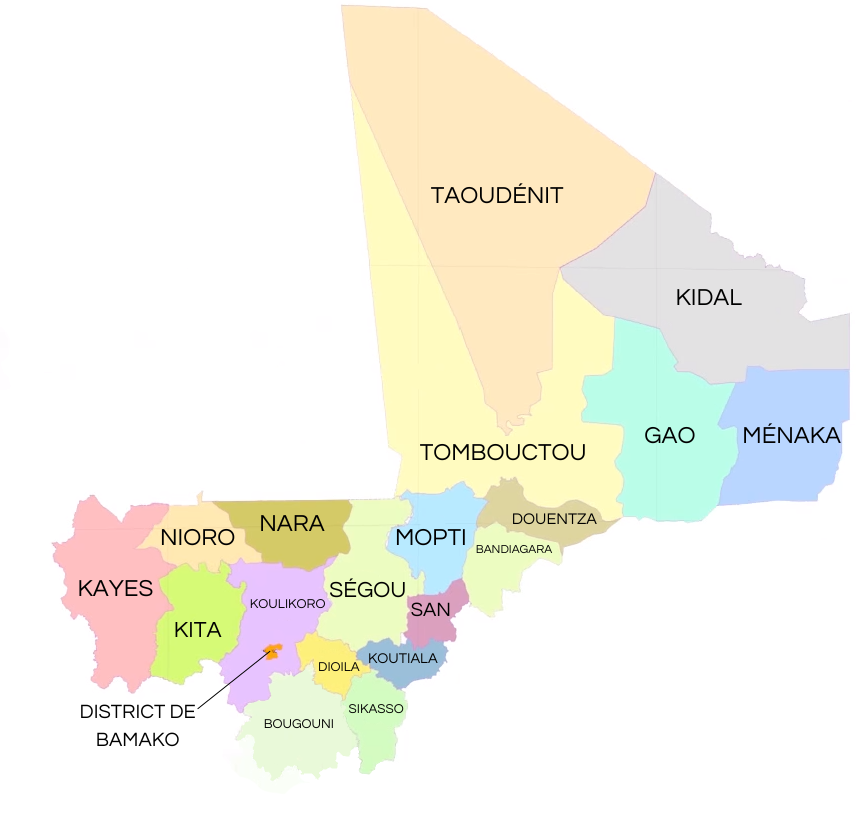
Regions of Mali since 2023

The administrative structure is organized on four levels: 19 regions, 159 cercles, 466 arrondissements, and 819 communes or 12,712 villages, along with the capital district of Bamako. Each region has a governor and is represented on the High Council of Territorial Units by indirectly elected national councilors. Many rural areas lack any state presence, with the administrative structure being distributed unevenly. This is because of the size of the country and the persistent insecurity.

Mali has been implementing decentralization since 1993. There were eight regions and the district of Bamako from 1996, which became ten regions in 2006. Since 2023, Mali has added nine regions to its administrative structure, bringing the total to 19 regions plus the district of Bamako. This initiative continues the decentralization efforts that began with the creation of the Taoudénit and Ménaka regions in 2016.

The regions and the capital district are:

No	Region name	Area (km^{2})	2023 Population (Note: According to the Census)
00	Bamako Capital District	252	4,227,569
01	Kayes	62,914	1,840,329
02	Koulikoro	71,178	2,255,157
03	Sikasso	21,378	1,533,123
04	Ségou	31,996	2,455,263
05	Mopti	49,077	935,579
06	Tombouctou	180,781	974,278
07	Gao	89,532	727,517
08	Kidal	151,430	83,192
09	Taoudénit	323,326	100,358
10	Ménaka	81,040	318,876
11	Bougouni	41,052	1,570,979
12	Dioila	12,984	675,965
13	Nioro	24,179	678,061
14	Koutiala	14,739	1,169,882
15	Kita	44,175	681,671
16	Nara	26,213	307,777
17	Bandiagara	25,709	868,916
18	San	15,516	820,807
19	Douentza	63,515	170,189
Total		1,240,192	22,395,489

== Economy ==
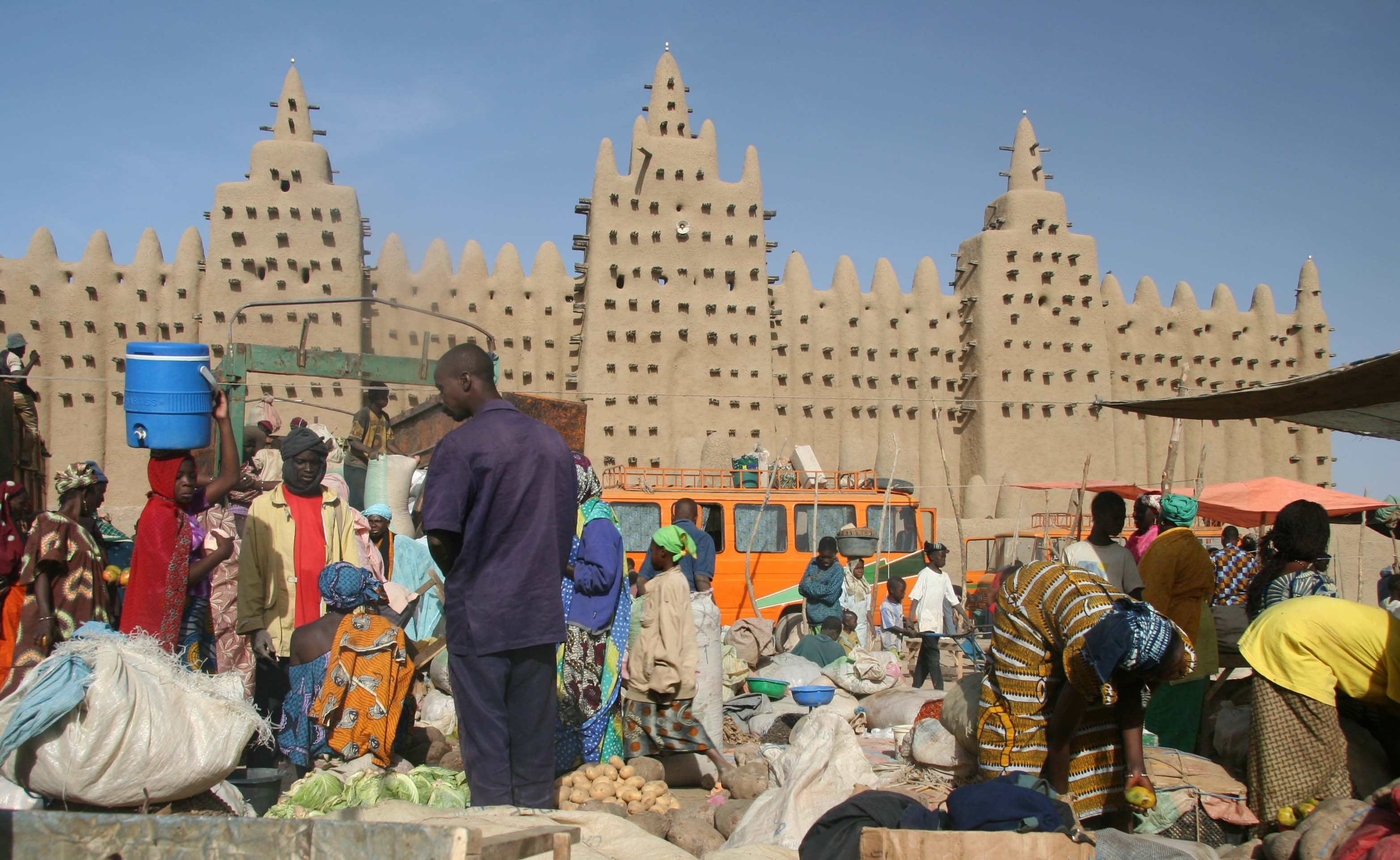
A market scene in Djenné

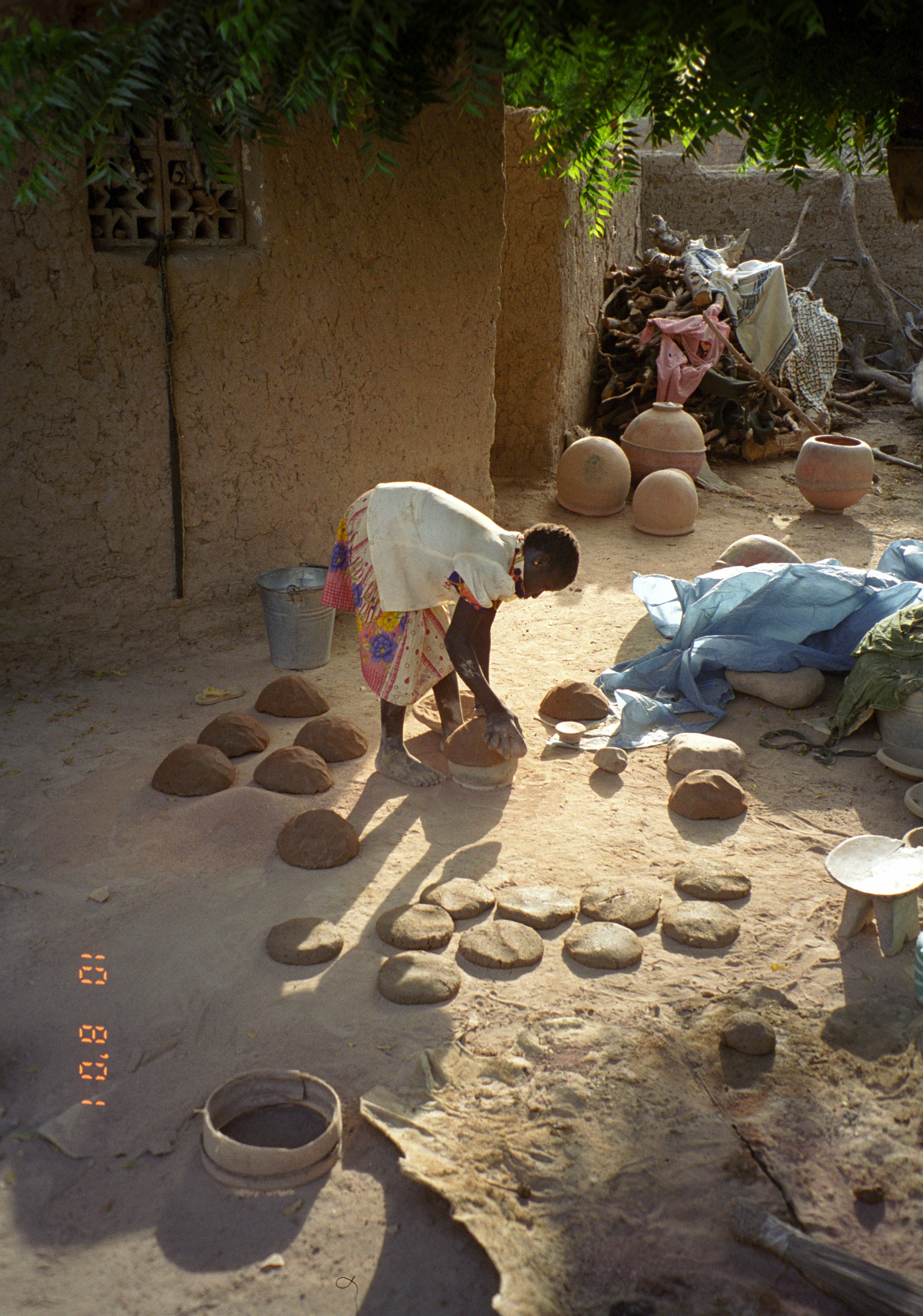
Kalabougou potters

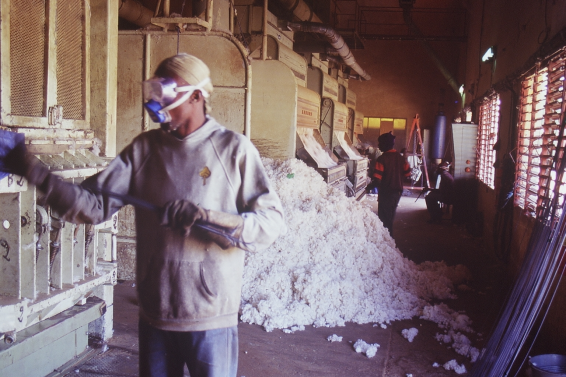
Cotton processing at CMDT

As of 2024, the country had a nominal GDP of US$26.78 billion and a PPP-adjusted GDP of $81.45 billion. Mali remains one of the poorest and least developed countries in the world and has a large informal economy. It has heavily relied on assistance from foreign donors, which have reduced their activities during the instability of the 2020s. Since then the transitional government has used regional financial markets to finance its deficit. Most Malians (95%) have informal jobs, with 80% of the population involved in farming, fishing, or raising livestock. The agriculture sector is the largest, accounting for a third of the GDP. Mali's export economy is dominated by gold mining, which represented 80% of the country's exports in 2024. Though cotton is a distant second as an export commodity, one-fifth of the population works in that industry. Ivory Coast, Senegal, and China are Mali's top import partners, while South Africa, Switzerland, and Australia are top export partners.

Economic development has been undermined by instability, limited infrastructure and electricity, and government corruption. There has been an economic recovery since the COVID-19 pandemic in Mali and the ECOWAS sanctions in 2022. As a member of the West African Economic and Monetary Union, Mali uses the CFA franc that is issued by the Central Bank of West African States. As a result, it experiences monetary stability and low inflation. However, businesses have struggled to get access to financing in recent years. Mali is also connected with the French government by agreement since the creation of the bank in 1962.

GDP per capita development of Mali up to 2018

Mali underwent economic reform beginning in 1988 by signing agreements with the World Bank and the International Monetary Fund. During 1988 to 1996, the government largely reformed public enterprises. Between 1992 and 1995, Mali implemented an economic adjustment programme that resulted in economic growth and a reduction in financial imbalances. The programme increased social and economic conditions and led to Mali joining the WTO in 1995. Mali is a member of the Organization for the Harmonization of Business Law in Africa (OHADA).

=== Agriculture ===
Mali's key industry is agriculture. Cotton is the largest crop export and is exported west throughout Senegal and Ivory Coast. During 2002, 620,000 tons of cotton were produced, but cotton prices declined significantly in 2003. In addition to cotton, Mali produces rice, millet, corn, vegetables, tobacco, and tree crops. Agriculture is undermined by erratic rainfall, flooding, low usage of agricultural equipment, and a volatile security situation.

Eighty percent of workers are employed in agriculture, and 15% are employed in the service sector. Seasonal variations lead to regular temporary unemployment of agricultural workers. Around 127,000 hectares of agricultural land are managed by the state-owned Niger River Authority (Office du Niger).

=== Mining ===
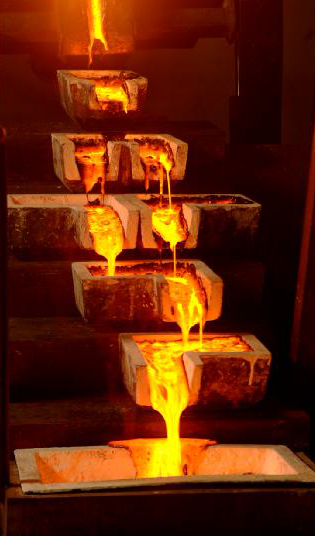
Melted gold at Sadiola Gold Mine, Kayes (Source: Iamgold)

Gold is mined in the southern region, and Mali was the second largest producer of gold in Africa as of 2024. In 2015, the country produced 41 metric tonnes of gold. The emergence of gold as its leading export product since 1999 has helped mitigate some of the negative impact of the cotton and Ivory Coast crises. Other natural resources include kaolin, salt, phosphate, and limestone.

In 1991, with the assistance of the International Development Association, Mali relaxed the enforcement of mining codes which led to renewed foreign interest and investment in the mining industry. In 2023, Mali adopted a mining code that raises the requirement of state and local investor ownership of mining companies to 35% from the previous 20%, seeking to increase revenue. The code has led to disputes with established mining companies.

=== Energy ===
Electricity and water are maintained by the Energie du Mali (EDM). Outside the cities, the Malian Agency for Rural Electrification allows private companies to generate and distribute electricity to villages. EDM is heavily financed by the government and regional multinational banks. As of 2023, the majority (66%) of electricity was generated by diesel generators, followed by hydroelectric generation. Solar represented 2.7% of generation capacity. In the cities, 55% of the population have access to EDM. Overall, the national accessibility to electricity is 40%, and it is just 20% in rural areas. Powers cuts are common, and as of 2024 Bamako and other areas experienced blackouts that lasted up to 18 hours.

=== Transportation ===
Mali has 89,000 kilometres (55,000 mi) of roads, which are in poor condition. The most significant highway is the Trans-Sahelian Highway, which links three major cities—Bamako, Sikasso, and Kayes—with Dakar and N'Djamena. The section from Bamako to the Senegalese border is called the Northern Bamako-Dakar Corridor, and is Mali's most important roadway, with the majority of its imports and exports passing on it. Domestically, the Northern Bamako-Dakar Corridor uses Malian National Routes 1 and 3. Another major highway is the Trans-Saharan Road Corridor, which uses National Routes 6, 16, and 17 to connect Bamako to Ségou, Mopti, Sévaré, and Gao; as well as to Algiers and Lagos via Niger.

The Dakar–Bamako Railway runs parallel to part of the Northern Bamako-Dakar Corridor. The Malian section has 641 kilometres (398 mi) of track. The railway was managed by foreign companies until they ceased operations in 2010. In 2016, Mali and Senegal formed the joint company Dakar Bamako Ferroviaire to revive the line. Passenger service between Kayes and Bamako was restarted in June 2023 after five years of renovation. There are also approximately 29 airports, of which 8 have paved runways. Urban areas are known for their large quantity of green and white taxi cabs. A significant sum of the population is dependent on public transportation.

== Demographics ==
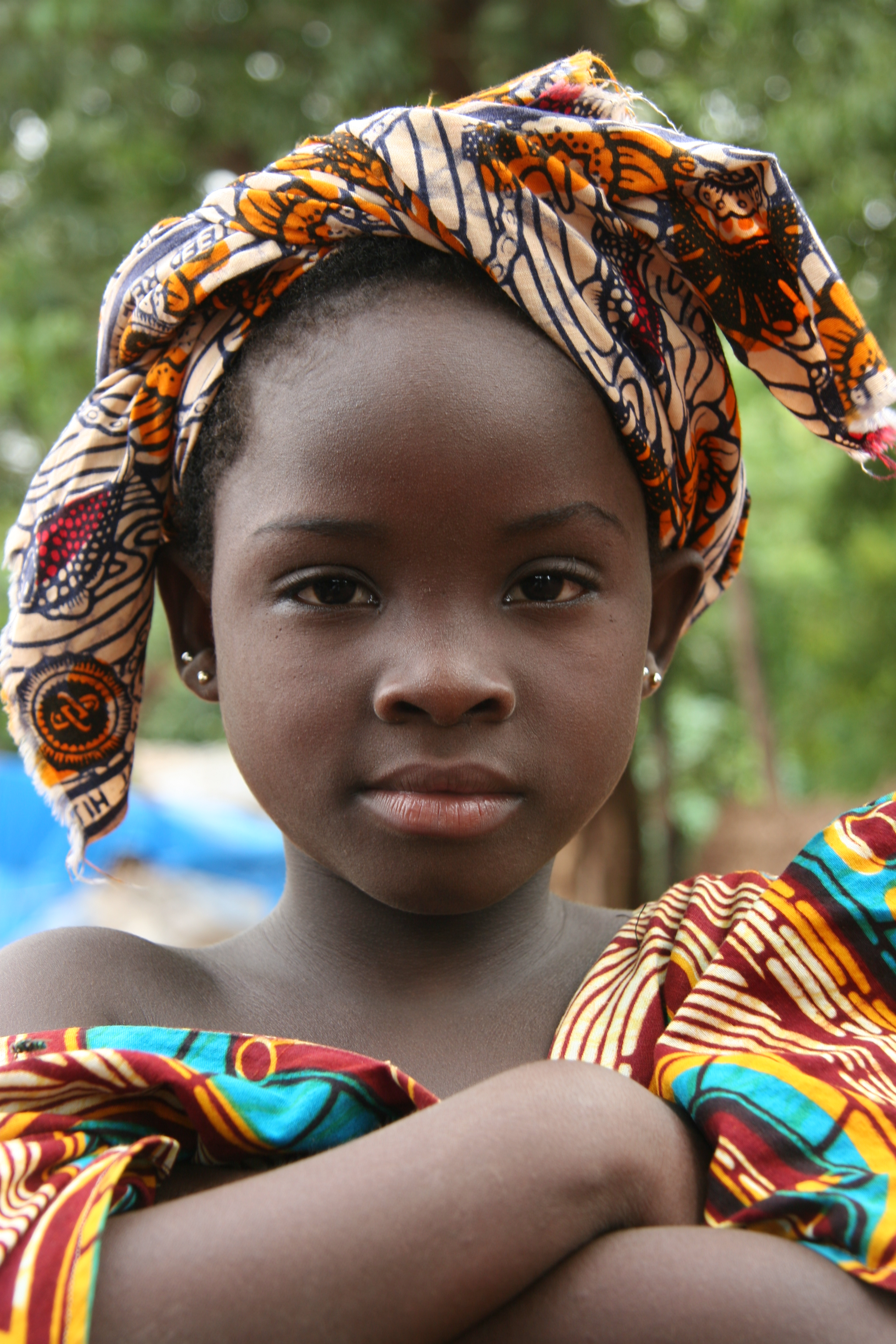
A Bozo girl in Bamako

Population of Mali
Year	Million
1950	4.7
2000	11
2021	21.9

In 2021 the population was an estimated 21.9 million, which grew from 7.7 million in 1982. The population is predominantly rural (69.7% in 2022), and 5%–10% of Malians are nomadic. More than 90% live in southern Mali, especially in Bamako, which has over 4 million residents.

In 2024, about 47% were 14 years old or younger, 50% were 15–64 years old, and 3% were 65 and older. The median age was 16.4 years. The birth rate in 2024 was 40 births per 1,000, and the total fertility rate in 2024 was 5.35 children per woman. The death rate in 2024 was 8.1 deaths per 1,000. Life expectancy at birth was 63.2 years total (60.9 for males and 65.6 for females). Mali has one of the world's highest rates of infant mortality, with 57.4 deaths per 1,000 live births in 2024.

=== Largest cities ===
Largest cities or towns in Mali According to the 2009 Census
Rank	Name	Region	Pop.
1	Bamako	Bamako	1,810,366
2	Sikasso	Sikasso	226,618
3	Koutiala	Sikasso	141,444
4	Ségou	Ségou	133,501
5	Kayes	Kayes	126,319
6	Mopti	Mopti	120,786
7	Kalabancoro	Koulikoro	96,173
8	Gao	Gao	86,353
9	Kati	Koulikoro	84,500
10	San	Ségou	66,967

=== Ethnic groups ===
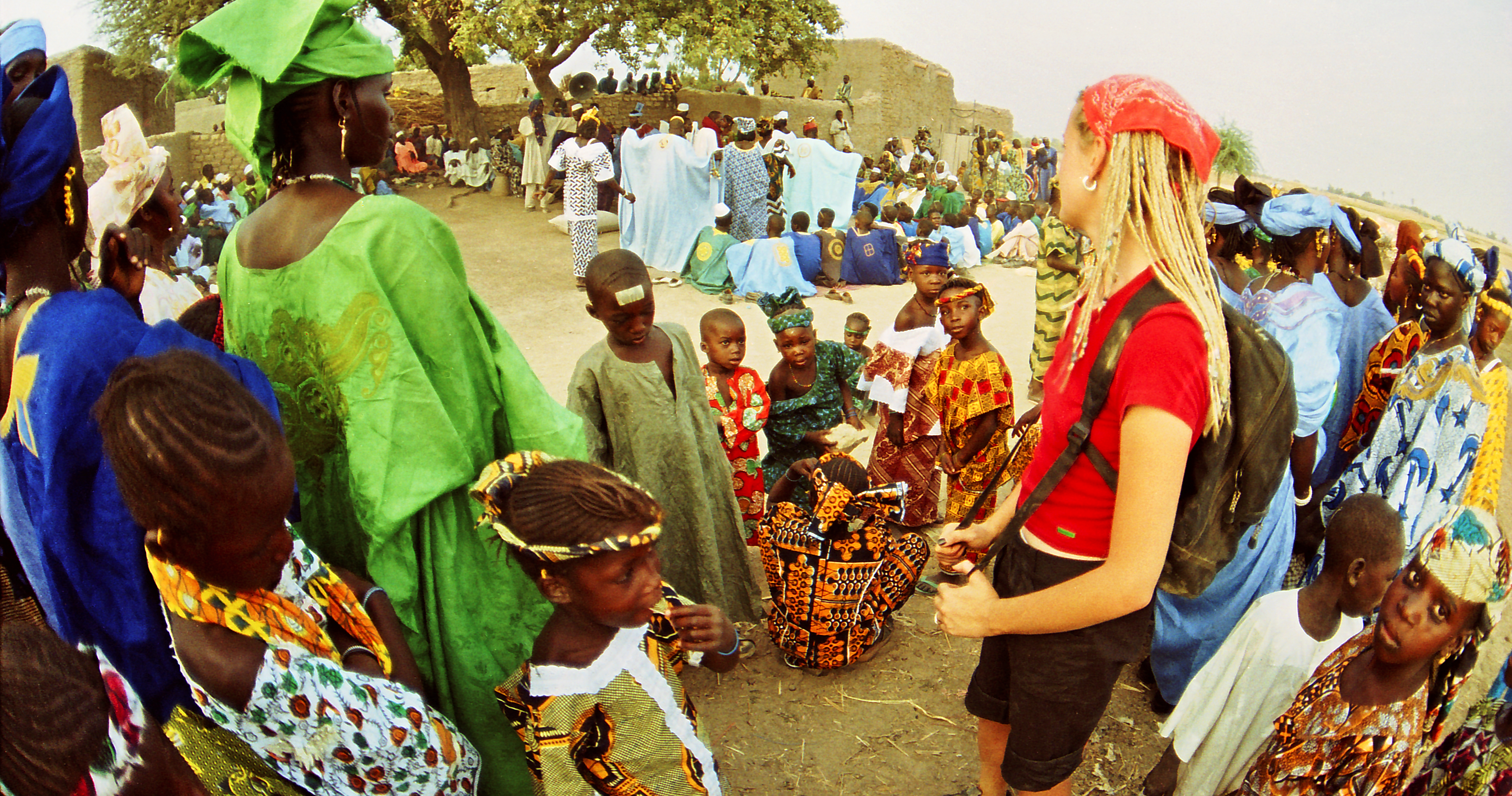
A Bambara wedding in Mali, observed by a tourist

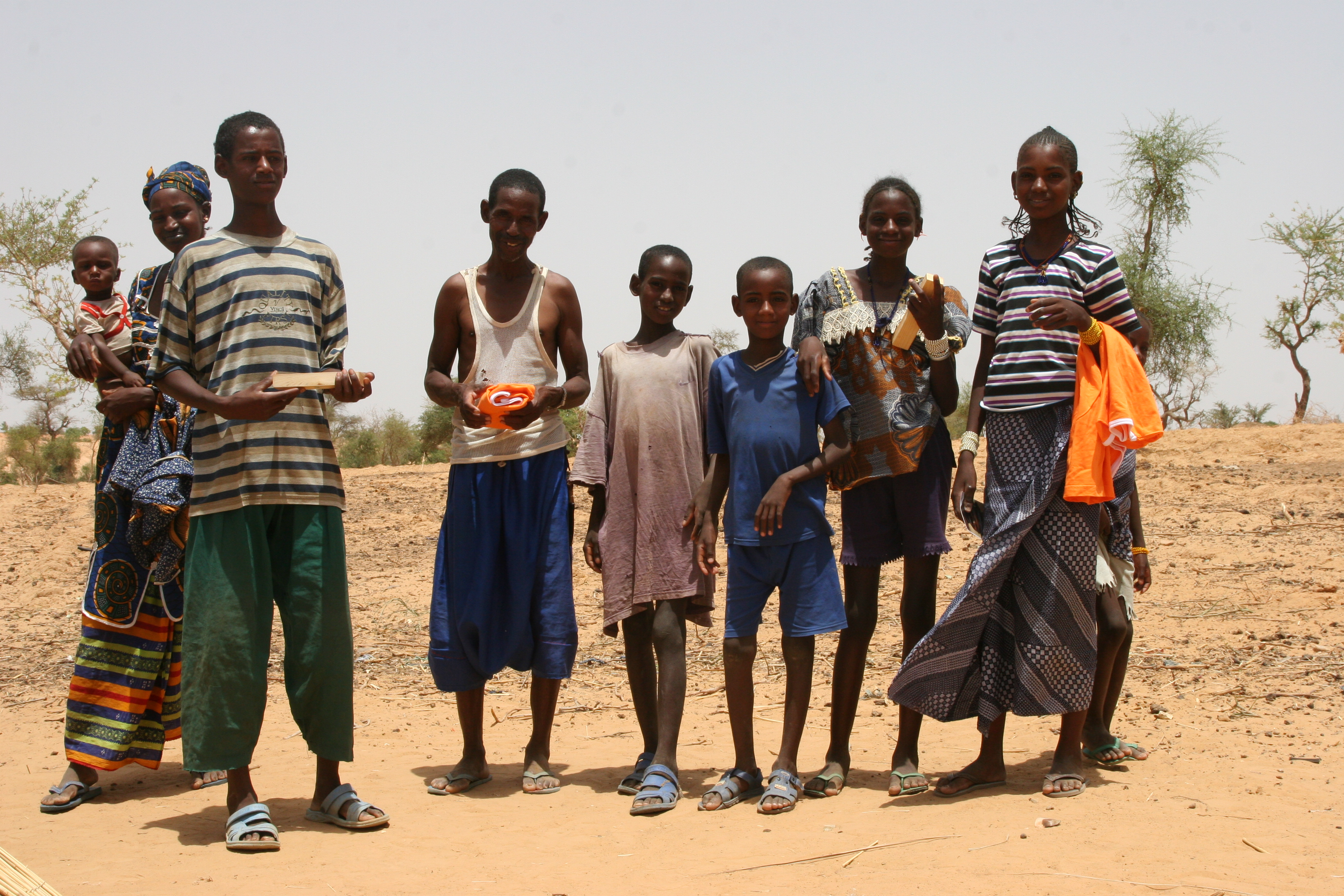
Fulani children in Mali

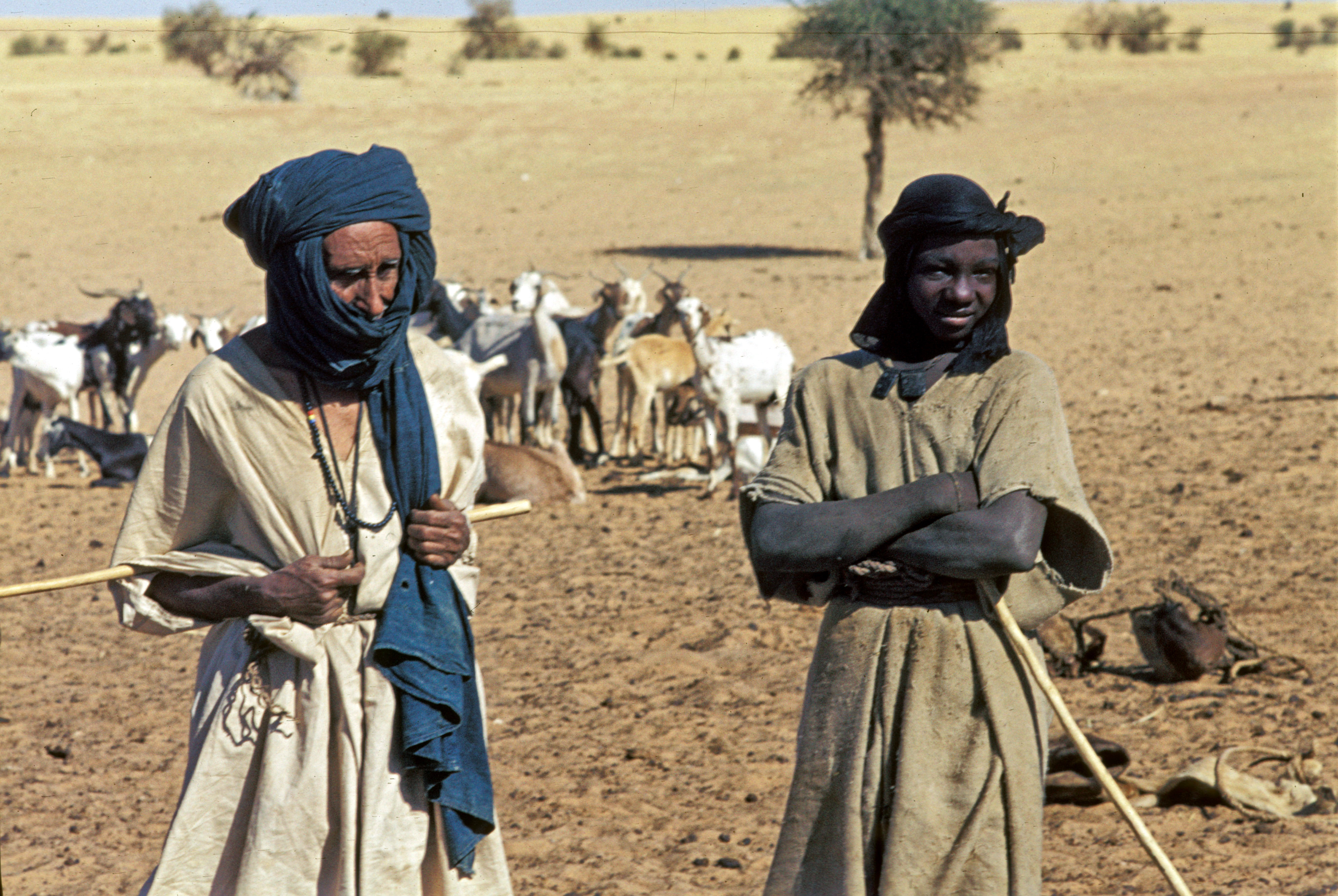
The Tuareg are nomadic inhabitants of northern Mali.

Mali's population encompasses several sub-Saharan ethnic groups. The Bambara are by far the largest single ethnic group, making up over a third of the population, particularly concentrated around Bamako. According to the 2022 general population and housing census, the largest ethnic groups are the Bambara (35.9%), Fulani (Peuhl) (12.8%), Senufo/Manianka (9.4%), Malinke (8.4%), Sarakole/Soninke/Marka (8.2%), Dogon (6.1%), Sonrai (4.8%), Tuareg (3.9%), Bobo/Bwa (2.2%), Bozo (1.9%), Arabs (1.7%), with smaller ethnic groups making up the rest. While some ethnicities, like the Bambara and Fula, are spread throughout southern Mali, others have particular concentrations. The Malinke and Soninke live in the west. The Bandiagara Escarpment is dominated by the Dogon, while the Songhai mainly inhabit the Niger River valley. The Sahara is dominated by the nomadic Arab and Tuareg tribes. In Mali and in Niger, the Moors are also known as Azawagh Arabs, named after the Azawagh region of the Sahara. They speak mainly Hassaniya Arabic, one of the regional varieties of Arabic.

In the far north, there is a division within the Tuareg between the free Tuareg and the darker-skinned Bella, who formed the historical slave caste of the region. An estimated 800,000 people in Mali are descended from slaves. Slavery has persisted in Mali for centuries. The Arabic population kept slaves well into the 20th century, until slavery was suppressed by French authorities around the mid-20th century. There still persist certain hereditary servitude relationships, and according to some estimates approximately 200,000 Malians are enslaved.

Some mixed European/African descendants of Muslims of Spanish, as well as French, Irish, Italian and Portuguese origin, live in Mali, where they are known as the Arma people (1% of the population).

Although Mali has enjoyed reasonably good inter-ethnic relationships based on a long history of coexistence, some hereditary servitude and bondage relationship exist, as well as ethnic tension between settled Songhai and nomadic Tuaregs of the north. Due to a backlash against the northern population after independence, Mali is now in a situation where both groups complain about discrimination on the part of the other group. This conflict also plays a role in the continuing northern Mali conflict where there is a tension between both Tuaregs and the Malian government, and the Tuaregs and Jihadist militias who are trying to establish sharia.

There is a small Jewish community in Mali.

=== Languages ===
Spoken languages in Mali (2022 census)
1. Bambara (57.83%)
2. Fula (6.24%)
3. Malinke (5.91%)
4. Maraka / Soninké (5.34%)
5. Songhai (4.56%)
6. Dogon (4.11%)
7. Tuareg (3.57%)
8. Minianka (3.23%)
9. Senufo (2.09%)
10. Bobo (1.61%)
11. Bozo (1.06%)
12. Kassonké (0.94%)
13. Other languages of Mali (2.07%)
14. Other African languages (0.43%)
15. Other foreign languages (1.01%)
Mother tongues in Mali (2022 census)
1. Bambara (49.90%)
2. Fula (8.19%)
3. Malinke (7.10%)
4. Maraka / Soninké (6.53%)
5. Dogon (5.43%)
6. Songhai (4.58%)
7. Minianka (4.08%)
8. Tamasheq (3.85%)
9. Senufo (2.83%)
10. Bobo (1.93%)
11. Bozo (1.41%)
12. Kassonké (1.10%)
13. Maure (0.92%)
14. Other Malian (1.85%)
15. Other African (0.11%)
16. Other foreign (0.19%)

Malians speak a variety of languages, the most widely being Bambara spoken as mother tongue by nearly half the population. In January 2022 the government announced Bambara its official language; French was dropped as an official language, becoming instead a working language. The 2023 constitution of Mali proclaims "all national languages are official languages" while not naming any of those languages. The lingua franca in Mali is mainly Bambara, which about 80 percent of the population use for communication. Over 40 other African languages are spoken by the various ethnic groups of Mali.

According to the 2022 census, the languages spoken natively were Bambara by 49.9%, Fula (8.2%), Mandinka (7.1%), Soninké (6.5%), Dogon (6.0%), Songhai (4.6%), Minianka (4.2%), Tamasheq (3.9%), Sénoufo (2.8%), Bobo (1.9%), Tieyaxo Bozo (1.4%), Kassonké (1.1%), Maure or Hassaniya Arabic (0.9%), Dafing (0.3%), Samogo (0.5%), Arabic (other dialects) (0.4%), other Malian languages (0.6%), French (0.1%), other African languages (0.1%), and other non-African languages (0.1%).

=== Religion ===
Religion in Mali (Pew 2024)
Religion	Percent
Islam	90%
Christianity	8%
Traditional faiths	1%
Other religions	1%

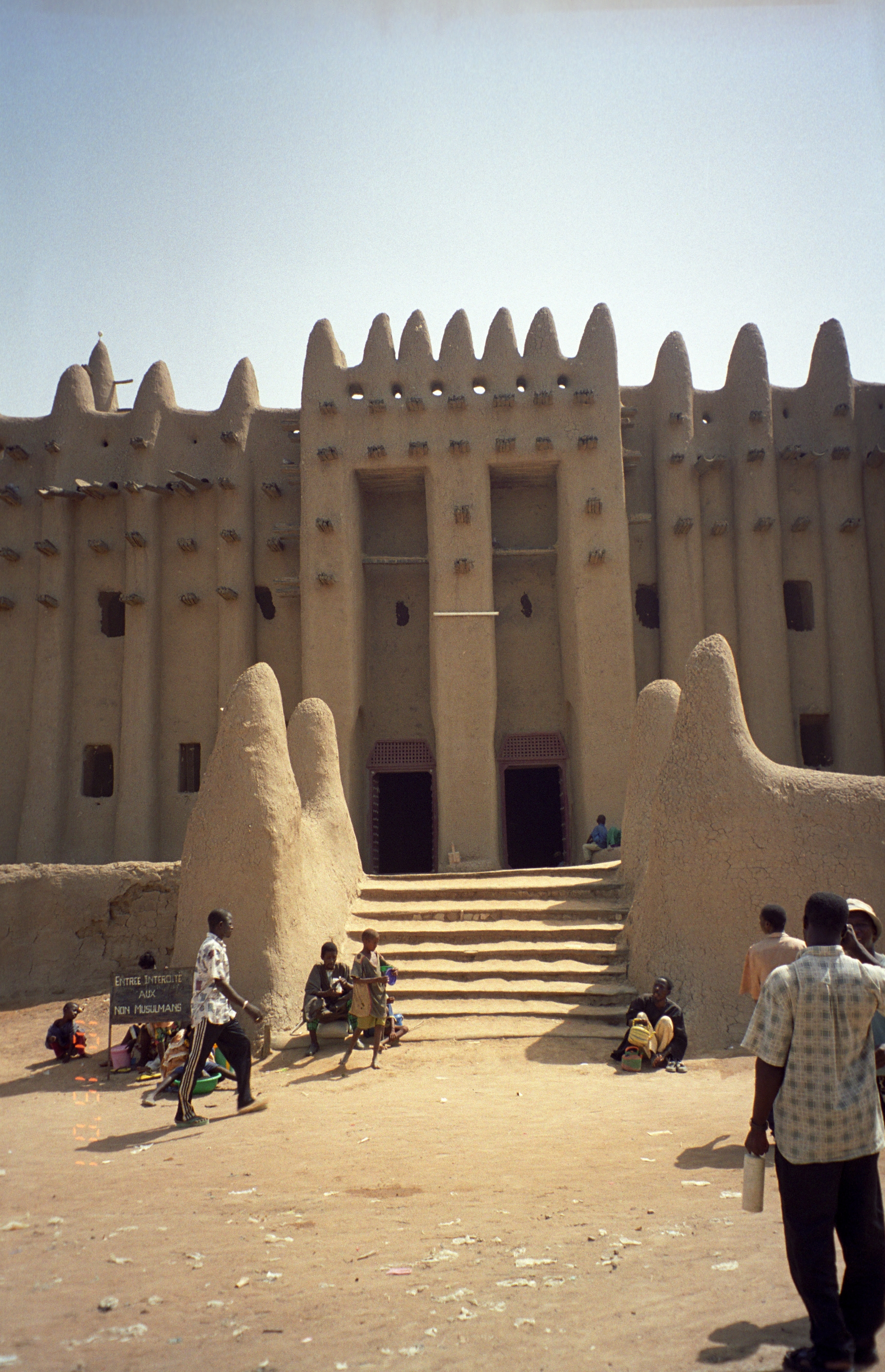
An entrance to the Djinguereber mosque

Islam was introduced to West Africa in the 11th century and remains the predominant religion in much of the region. The 2022 census reported that 96.4% of Malians are Muslim (mostly non-denominational and Sunni), approximately 2.3% are Christian (about 1.4% Roman Catholic and 0.8% Protestant), and the remaining 0.7% adhere to traditional African religions such as the Dogon religion. Atheism and agnosticism are believed to be rare among Malians, most of whom practise their religion daily, though the census found 0.5% of Malians identified with no religion.

The constitution establishes a secular state and provides for freedom of religion, and the government largely respects this right.

Islam as historically practised in Mali has been malleable and adapted to local conditions; relations between Muslims and practitioners of minority religious faiths have generally been amicable. After the 2012 imposition of sharia rule in northern parts of the country, however, Mali came to be listed high (number 7) in the Christian persecution index published by Open Doors, which described the persecution in the north as severe.

=== Education ===
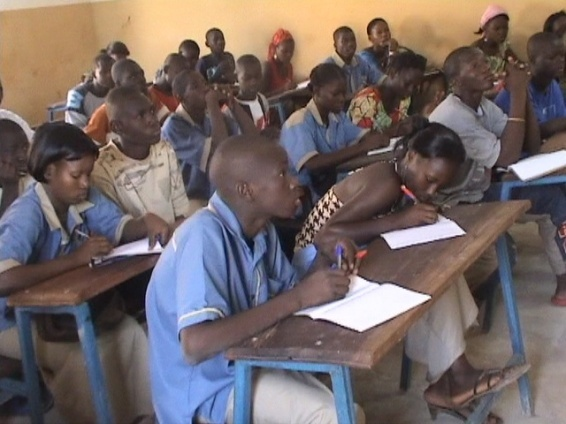
High school students in Kati

Public education in Mali is in principle provided free of charge and is compulsory for nine years between the ages of seven and sixteen. The system encompasses six years of primary education beginning at age 7, followed by six years of secondary education. Primary school enrollment rate is low, in large part because families are unable to cover the cost of uniforms, books, supplies, and other fees required to attend.

In 2017, the primary school enrollment rate was 61% (65% of males and 58% of females). In the late 1990s, the secondary school enrollment rate was 15% (20% of males and 10% of females). The education system is plagued by a lack of schools in rural areas, as well as shortages of teachers and materials.

Estimates of literacy rates range from 27–30 to 46.4%, with literacy rates significantly lower among women than men. The University of Bamako, which includes four constituent universities, is the largest university and enrolls approximately 60,000 undergraduate and graduate students.

=== Health ===
Mali faces numerous health challenges related to poverty, malnutrition, and inadequate hygiene and sanitation. Health and development indicators rank among the worst in the world. Life expectancy at birth is estimated to be 63.2 years in 2024. In 2000, 62–65% of the population was estimated to have access to safe drinking water and only 69% to sanitation services of some kind. In 2001, the general government expenditures on health totaled about US$4 per capita at an average exchange rate.

Efforts have been made to improve nutrition and reduce associated health problems by encouraging women to make nutritious versions of local recipes. For example, the International Crops Research Institute for the Semi-Arid Tropics and the Aga Khan Foundation trained women's groups to make equinut, a healthy and nutritional version of the traditional recipe di-dèguè (comprising peanut paste, honey and millet or rice flour). The aim was to boost nutrition and livelihoods by producing a product that women could make and sell, and which would be accepted by the local community because of its local heritage.

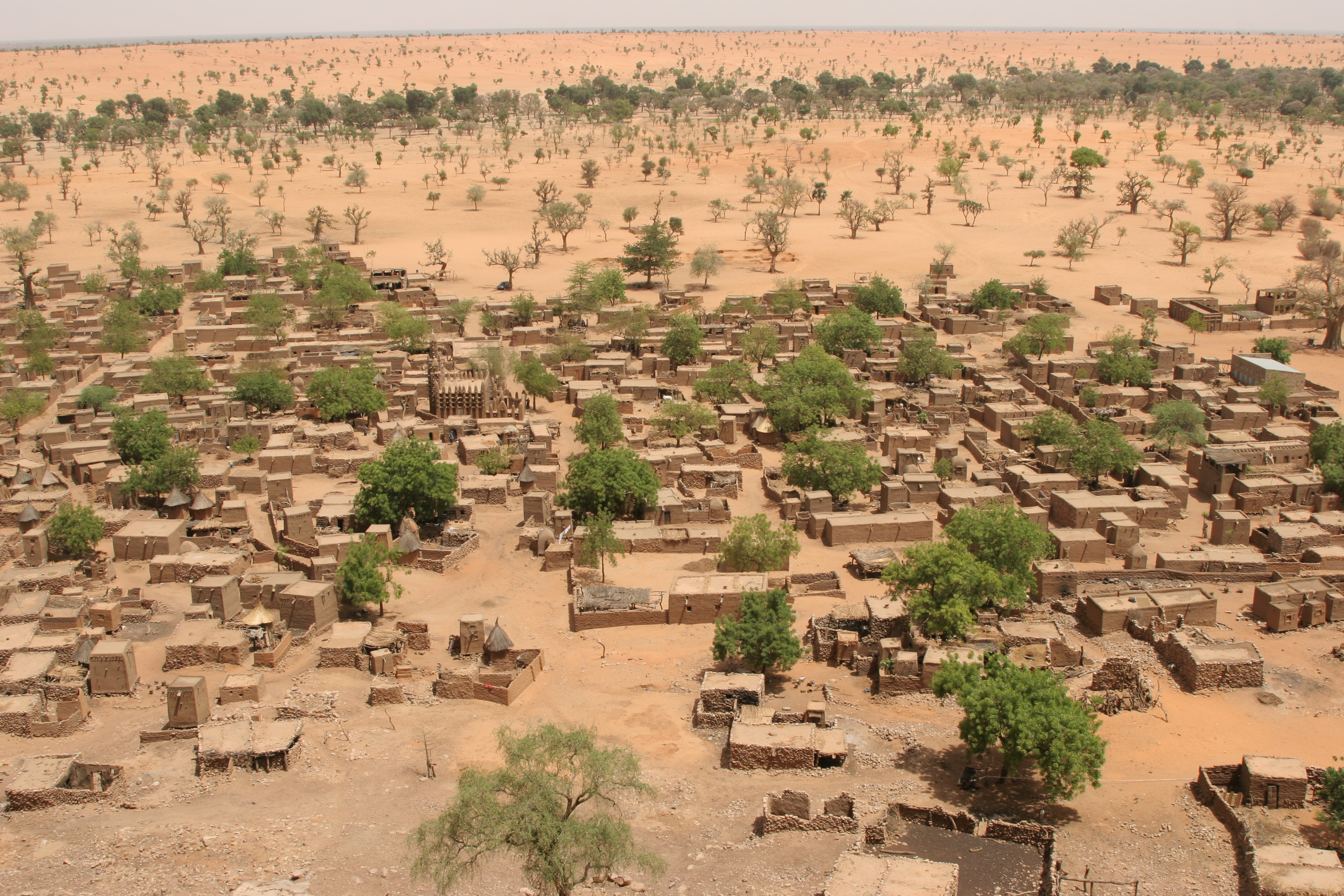
Village in the Sahel region

Medical facilities are very limited, and medicines are in short supply. Malaria and other arthropod-borne diseases are prevalent, as are a number of infectious diseases such as cholera and tuberculosis. The population suffers from a high rate of child malnutrition and a low rate of immunity. An estimated 1.9% of the adult and children population was afflicted with HIV/AIDS that year, among the lowest rates in Sub-Saharan Africa. An estimated 85%–91% of Mali's girls and women have had female genital mutilation (2006 and 2001 data).

In 2024, approximately 7.1 million people, including over 3.8 million children, require urgent humanitarian assistance due to escalating conflict and climate crises. UNICEF is amplifying its efforts to provide essential services like health, education, and protection, while appealing for $133.5 million to address these needs. The situation is dire, with over 522,000 children lacking access to education and millions at risk of malnutrition amid underfunded humanitarian responses.

=== Gender inequality ===
In 2017, Mali ranked 157th out of 160 countries in the gender inequality index as reported by the United Nations Development Programme. The constitution states that it protects women's rights, however many laws exist that discriminate against women. Provisions in the laws limit women's decision-making power after marriage, in which the husband becomes superior to his wife. Women are blamed for not maintaining the appearance of their husbands and are also blamed for the actions of their children if they misbehave, which encourages the cultural attitude that women are inferior to men. The lack of participation of women in politics is due to the idea that politics is associated with men and that women should avoid this sector. Education is also an area in which boys dominate, since it is seen as a better investment for the parents. As traditional values and practices have contributed to gender inequality, conflict and lawlessness have also influenced the growing gap in gender through gender-based violence.

Religion, the patriarchal norms, and gender-based violence are major negative factors shaping the lives of women. Patriarchal norms cause major gender inequalities and lead to male domination within the household. Girls learn household activities like chores, cooking, and childcare at a young age and are expected to take the main responsibility of household chores throughout their life. This hampers women's ability to enter the formal workforce and leads to a lack of education of girls. Gender-based violence happens both on a national and a family level. At the national level, in 2012 the conflict in the north increased cases of kidnappings and rapes. The conflict also reduced women's access to resources, economy, and opportunities. At the household level, women face gender-based violence through domestic violence, forced marriages, and marital rape. The Demographic Health Survey for Mali in 2013 stated that 76% of women and 54% of men believed physical harm towards women was acceptable if the women burnt food, argued back, went out without notifying her husband, or refused sexual relations with her husband. In 2024, officials approved a bill criminalising intimate relations between same-sex couples.

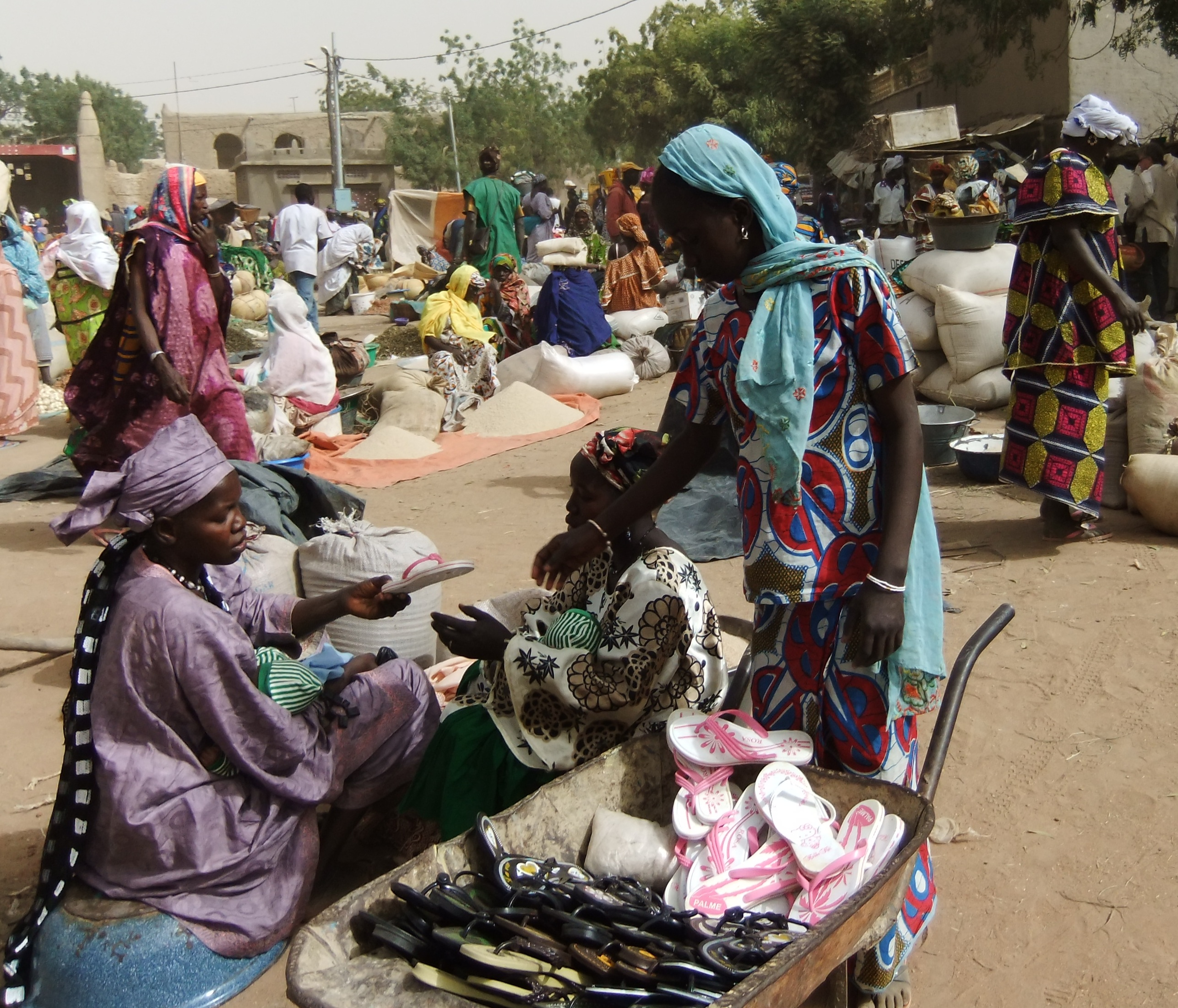
Malian women in Djenné

After adjusting the entrance requirements and access to education, girls have lower enrollment rates and less access to formal education. Drop-out rates for girls are 15% higher than that of boys because they have a higher responsibility at home and most parents refuse to allow all their children to go to school, so boys tend to become educated. Technical and vocational education has less female participation and isinadequately distributed throughout the country, with the training centers focused in the urban cities. Higher education for girls consist of short programs because early marriages prevent most girls from pursuing a longer term education program like those in science. Although women do not have the same access to education, in recent decades women have been entering and representing themselves in decision-making positions in the public administration sector, which has led to the promotion of women's rights in the political sphere.. Out of 147 members of Parliament, 15 were women in 2010.

Legislation at the international and national levels have been implemented over the decades to help promote women's rights. Mali signed the Beijing Platform for Action, which suggests that women should participate in decision-making, and the convention on the Elimination of All Forms of Discrimination against Women, which is the foundation to women's rights promotion. The constitution dictates equality to all citizens and discrimination is prohibited. The Poverty Reduction Strategy Programme and the Growth and Poverty Reduction Strategy Programme seek to improve the well-being of the citizens, and changes to governance and gender in the country. The Ministry for Advancement of Women, Children and the Family was created specifically for women and children so that their basics rights and needs get met under the law. Although there exists legislation and policy for gender equality, the institutionalization of the National Gender Policy of Mali is necessary to support the importance of women's rights. Strengthening and the support of girls' and women's access to education and training is recommended to improve gender equality.

== Culture ==
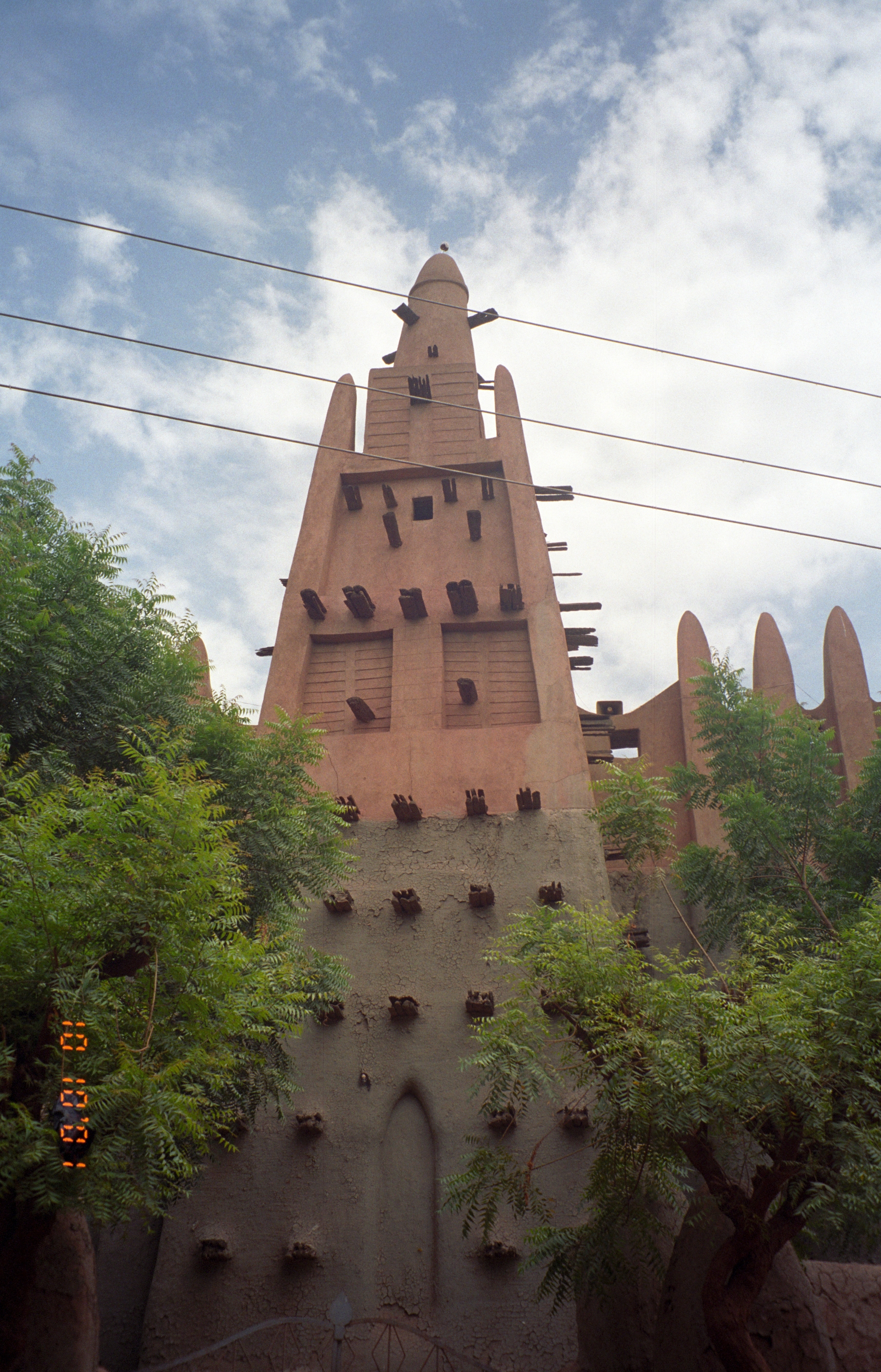
Konoguel Mosque tower

The varied everyday culture of Malians reflects the country's ethnic and geographic diversity. Most Malians wear flowing, colorful robes called boubous that are typical of West Africa. Malians frequently participate in traditional festivals, dances, and ceremonies.

=== Music ===
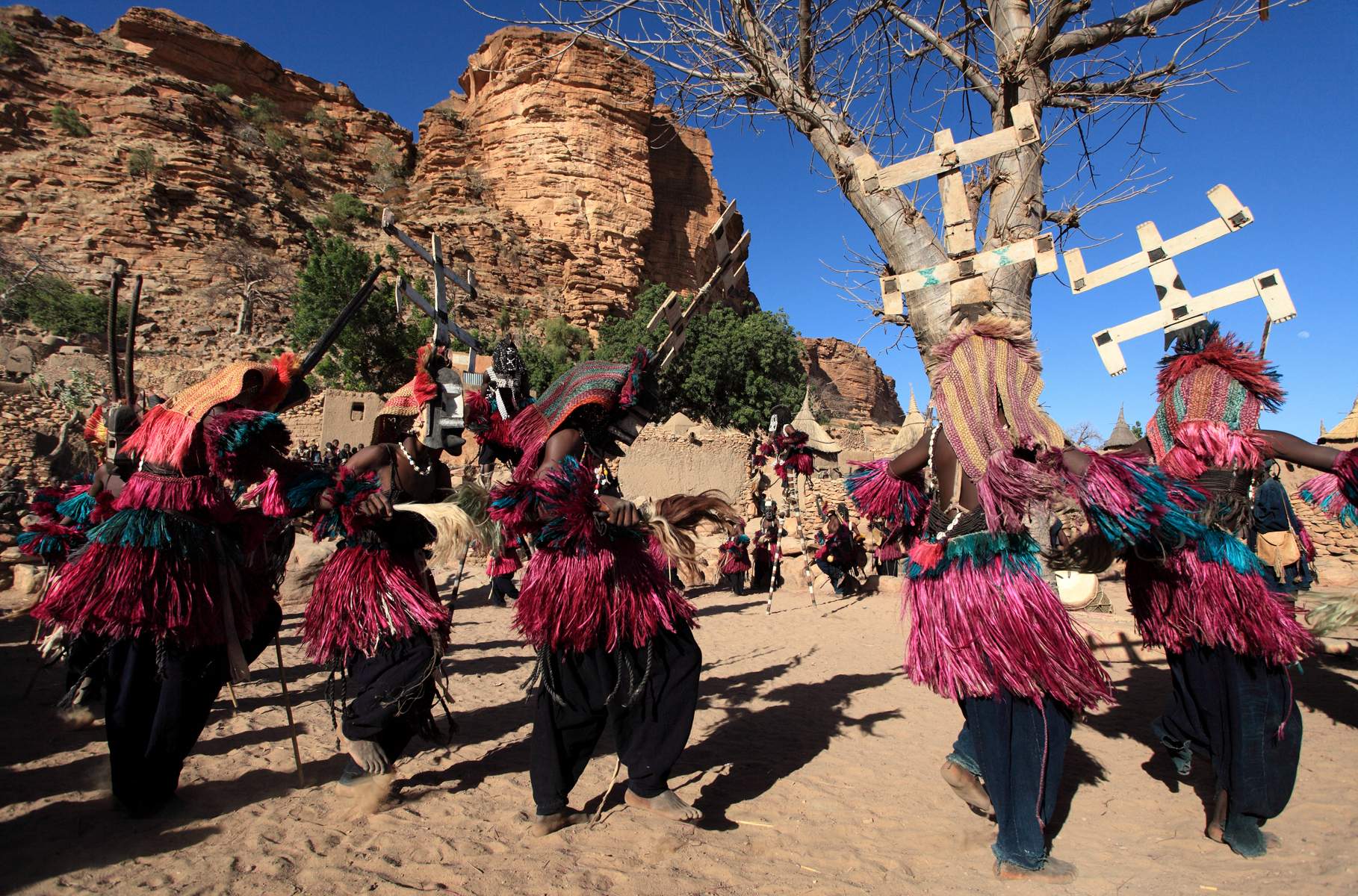
Mali Dogon dance

Malian musical traditions are derived from the griots, who are known as "Keepers of Memories". Malian music is diverse and has several different genres. Some influences are kora virtuoso musician Toumani Diabaté, the ngoni with Bassekou Kouyate the virtuoso of the electric jeli ngoni, the late roots and blues guitarist Ali Farka Touré, the Tuareg band Tinariwen, Khaira Arby, and several Afro-pop artists such as Salif Keita, the duo Amadou et Mariam, Oumou Sangare, Fatoumata Diawara, Rokia Traore, and Habib Koité. Dance also plays a large role; parties are common events among friends, and traditional mask dances are performed at ceremonial events.

=== Literature ===
Though Mali's literature is less famous than its music, Mali has always been one of Africa's liveliest intellectual centers. Literary tradition is passed mainly by word of mouth, with jalis reciting or singing histories and stories known by heart. Amadou Hampâté Bâ, Mali's best-known historian, spent much of his life writing these oral traditions down for the world to remember.

The best-known novel by a Malian writer is Yambo Ouologuem's Le devoir de violence, which won the 1968 Prix Renaudot but whose legacy was marred by accusations of plagiarism. Other well-known writers include Baba Traoré, Modibo Sounkalo Keita, Massa Makan Diabaté, Moussa Konaté, and Fily Dabo Sissoko.

=== Sport ===
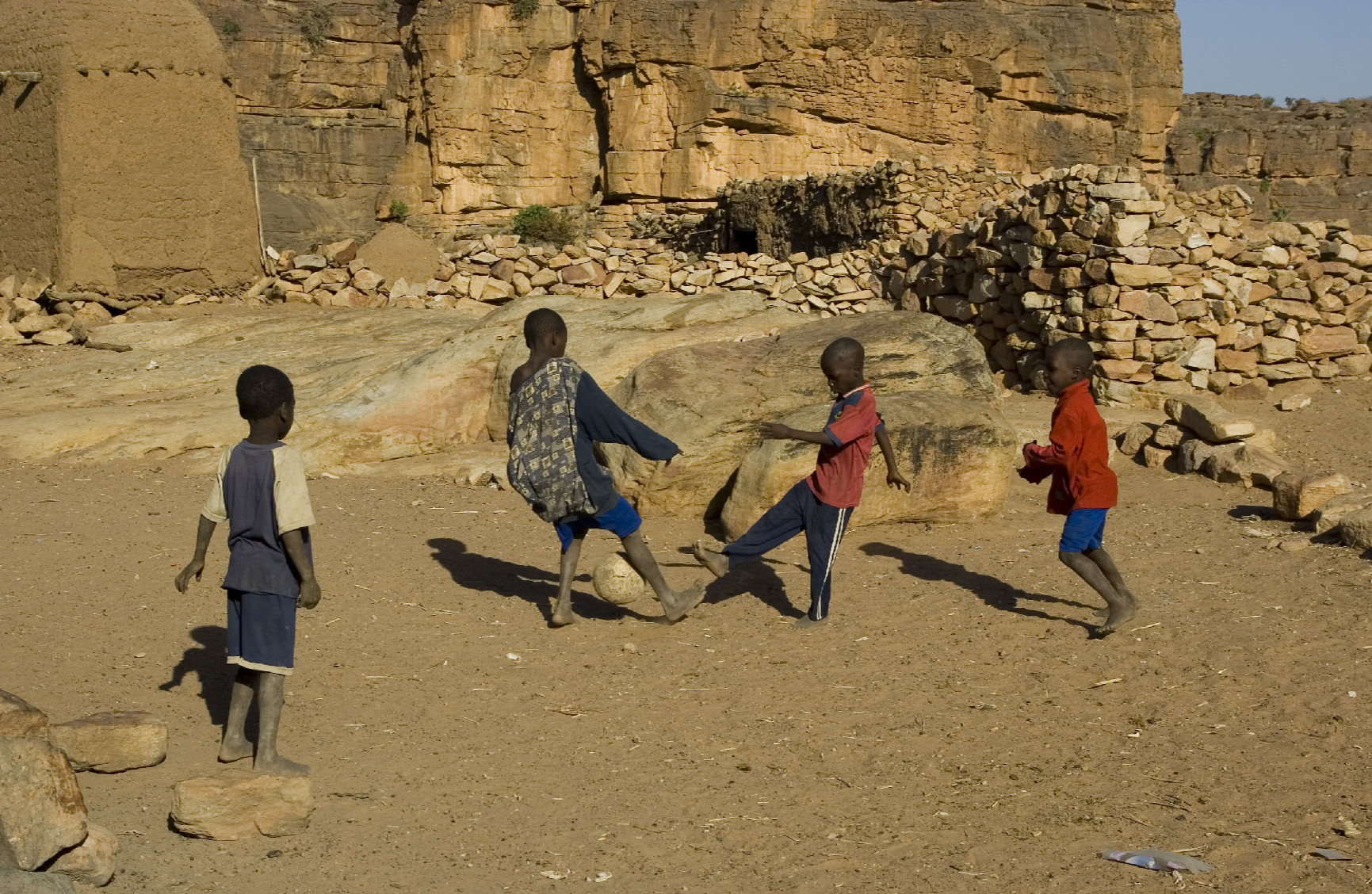
Malian children playing football in a Dogon village

The most popular sport in Mali is association football, which became more prominent after Mali hosted the 2002 African Cup of Nations. Most towns and cities have regular games; the most popular teams nationally are Djoliba AC, Stade Malien, and Real Bamako, all based in the capital. Informal games are often played by youths using a bundle of rags as a ball.

Basketball is another major sport; the Mali women's national basketball team, led by Hamchetou Maiga, competed at the 2008 Beijing Olympics. Traditional wrestling (la lutte) is also somewhat common, though popularity has declined in recent years. The game wari, a mancala variant, is a common pastime. Mali featured a men's national team in beach volleyball that competed at the 2018–2020 CAVB Beach Volleyball Continental Cup.

=== Cuisine ===
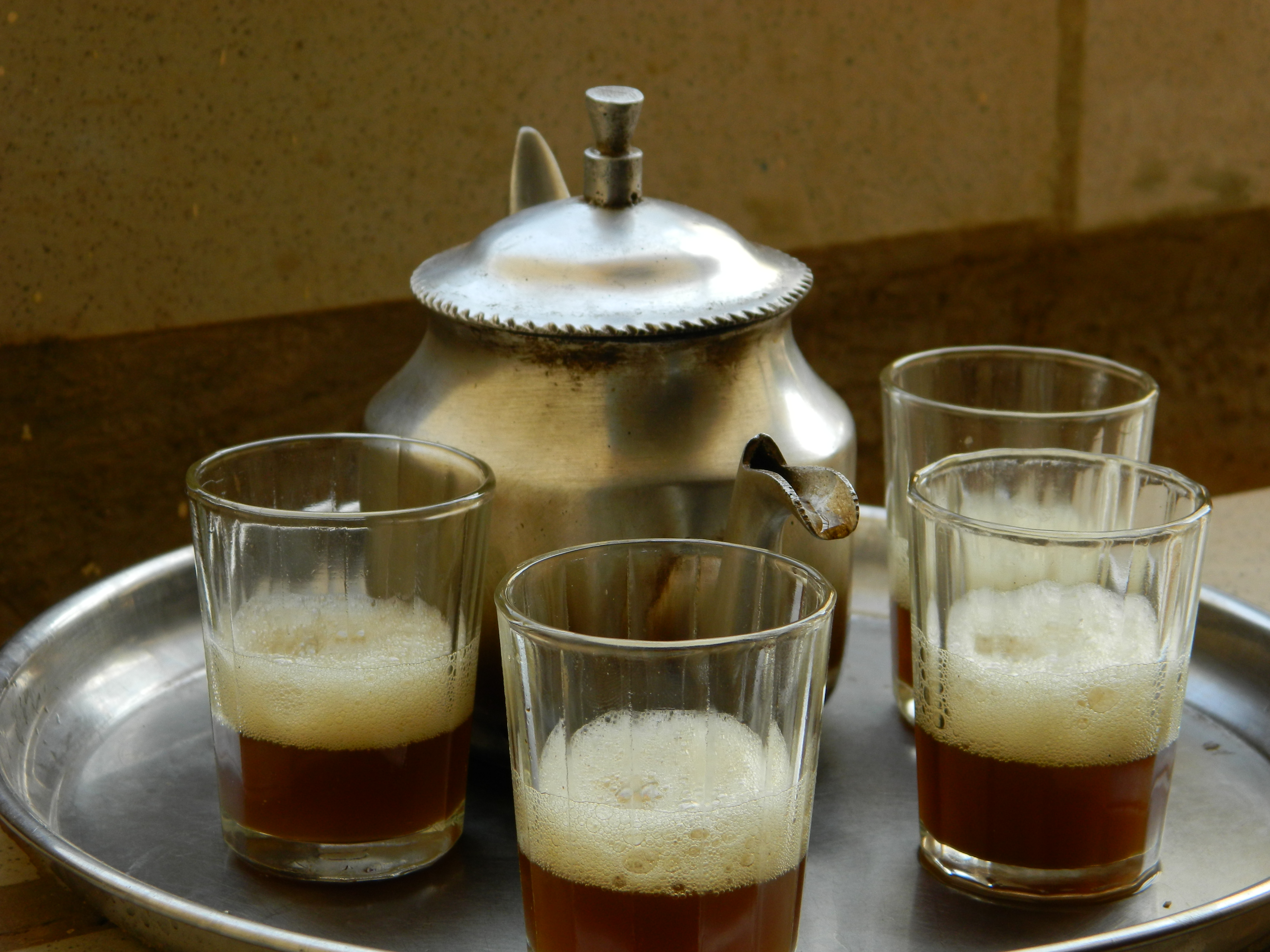
Malian tea

Rice and millet are the staples of Malian cuisine, which is heavily based on cereal grains. Grains are generally prepared with sauces made from edible leaves, such as spinach or baobab, with tomato peanut sauce, and may be accompanied by pieces of grilled meat (typically chicken, mutton, beef, or goat). Malian cuisine varies regionally. Other popular dishes include fufu, jollof rice, and maafe.

=== Media ===
There are several newspapers such as Les Echos, L'Essor, Info Matin, Nouvel Horizon, and Le Républicain. Office de Radiodiffusion-Télévision du Mali is the state-owned service. Telecommunications in Mali include 869,600 mobile phones, 45,000 televisions and 414,985 Internet users.

== See also ==
- Outline of Mali

== Bibliography ==
- "Constitution of Mali 1992". Comparative Constitutions Project. Translated by Anna, Daniel G. Archived from the original on 30 April 2026. (see also in French: "Constitution of Mali" (PDF) (in French). Archived from the original (PDF) on 20 September 2018.)
- "Country profile: Mali" (PDF). Library of Congress – Federal Research Division. January 2005. This article incorporates text from this source, which is in the public domain.
- Cissoko, Sekene Mody (1983). "Formations sociales et État en Afrique précoloniale : Approche historique". Présence Africaine. COLLOQUE SUR « LA PROBLÉMATIQUE DE L'ÉTAT EN AFRIQUE NOIRE » (127/128): 50–71. doi:10.3917/presa.127.0050. JSTOR 24350899.
- DiPiazza, Francesca Davis (2006). Mali in Pictures. Minneapolis, Minnesota: Learner Publishing Group. ISBN 978-0-8225-6591-8. Archived from the original on 7 September 2015.
- Fauvelle, Francois-Xavier (2022). Les masques et la mosquée - L'empire du Mâli XIIIe XIVe siècle. Paris: CNRS Editions. ISBN 978-2271143716.
- Milet, Eric & Manaud, Jean-Luc (2007). Mali (in French). Editions Olizane. ISBN 978-2-88086-351-7.
- Velton, Ross (2004). Mali. Bradt Travel Guides. ISBN 978-1-84162-077-0.
