= National Transitional Council (Mali) =

Mali legislature

Type
- Type: Unicameral

History
- Founded: 5 December 2020

Leadership
- President: Malick Diaw
- Seats: 133

Elections
- Voting system: Appointed by the transitional president of Mali

Meeting place
- Bamako, Mali

The National Transitional Council (Note: French: Conseil national de la transition; CNT) was established in Mali after the 2020 coup d'état to replace the National Assembly as a legislative body.

== History ==
After allegations of fraud during the 2020 election for the National Assembly led to mass protests and military coup against President Ibrahim Boubacar Keïta, the transitional government appointed a new legislature in the form of the National Transitional Council. In practice, since Col. Assimi Goïta assumed power after the 2021 military coup, the council has not been an effective counterweight to the power of the executive.

In July 2025, the military junta introduced a measure that gave Goïta a five-year term that is renewable indefinitely without elections, and it was passed by the transitional council.

== Composition ==
The council, whose members were appointed by a decree of the transitional president of Mali on 5 December 2020, originally consisted of 147 members. Members can be dismissed at will by the transitional president, and as of 2026 it has 133 members, including 93 men and 40 women.

Malick Diaw has been the president of the council since it was appointed.
