= Next Malian parliamentary election =

Parliamentary elections were scheduled to be held in Mali on 29 October 2023, after originally being planned for 27 February 2022. However, they were postponed by the military junta that took power in a 2021 coup.

== Background ==
A coup d'état began on the night of 24 May 2021 when the Malian Army led by Vice President Assimi Goïta captured President Bah N'daw, Prime Minister Moctar Ouane and Minister of Defence Souleymane Doucouré. Assimi Goïta, the head of the junta that led the 2020 Malian coup d'état, announced that N'daw and Ouane were stripped of their powers and that new elections would be held in 2022. It was the country's third coup d'état in ten years, following the 2012 and 2020 military takeovers, with the latter having happened only nine months earlier. After the coup, the military promised to respect the 27 February 2022 election plan by the previous government. Regional bloc, the Economic Community of West African States (ECOWAS) and the African Union suspended Mali from their organisations, but declined to impose further sanctions while repeatedly urging the authorities to hold the votes on schedule and promised more sanctions in case of a delay.

It was announced in December that a conference would take place recommending a timetable for democratic elections. On 30 December it was announced that polls scheduled for February should be delayed by six months to five years in part because of security issues. A significant coalition of political parties in Mali rejected the military-led government's plans for a slow transition to democratic rule. The military plan said the transition could take up to five years. Under its plan, a constitutional referendum would be held in 2023 and legislative elections in 2025. A presidential election would not take place until 2026. ECOWAS, West Africa's main political and economic bloc, imposed sanctions on the coup leaders and promised more if Mali did not produce a plan for the February elections by January. On 8 January it was announced that West African leaders would discuss Mali's postponement of elections and prepare new sanctions. On 9 January ECOWAS said all member countries will close borders with Mali and impose sweeping economic sanctions in response to delays in holding the promised elections after a 2020 military coup. In a communique, ECOWAS said it found the proposed timetable for a transition totally unacceptable. This timetable “simply means that an illegitimate military transition government will take the Malian people hostage", it said. The 15-member bloc said it had agreed to impose additional sanctions with immediate effect, including the closure of members’ land and air borders with Mali, the suspension of non-essential financial transactions, and the freezing of Malian state assets in ECOWAS central and commercial banks. Meanwhile, the regional monetary union UEMOA instructed all financial institutions under its umbrella to suspend Mali with immediate effect, severing the country’s access to regional financial markets.

At the ECOWAS summit meeting in Accra on 3 July 2022, the junta agreed to hold elections by February 2024 in exchange for the immediate removal of sanctions. However, in September 2023, the elections were postponed indefinitely due to "technical reasons," citing the adoption of the new Constitution and a dispute with the French company IDEMIA, which was in charge of conducting a census.

In May 2025, following pro-democracy protests, the military junta ordered the dissolution of all political parties and organizations. In July, Assimi Goïta was officially proclaimed president of the country, having been the de facto leader since the 2021 coup. His term would last five years, renewable "as many times as necessary" without the need for elections.

== Electoral system ==
The 147 members of the National Assembly are elected from 125 constituencies using the two-round system to serve five-year terms. In constituencies where there is more than one seat to be elected, block voting is used.
