= Next Malian presidential election =

- TBD
| Party | RPM | URD |
President before election
Assimi Goïta (interim)
Independent
President-elect
TBD

Presidential elections were scheduled to be held in Mali on 27 February 2022, following a 2021 coup. After being postponed, in July 2022 the elections were rescheduled for 4 February 2024. In September 2023, the junta stated that the elections would be "slightly postponed for technical reasons", without giving a date.

== Background ==
A coup d'état began on the night of 24 May 2021 when the Malian Army led by Vice President Assimi Goïta captured President Bah N'daw, Prime Minister Moctar Ouane and Minister of Defence Souleymane Doucouré. Goïta, the head of the junta that led the 2021 Malian coup d'état, announced that N'daw and Ouane were stripped of their powers and that new elections would be held in 2022. It is the country's third coup d'état in ten years, following the 2012 and 2020 military takeovers, with the latter having happened only nine months earlier. After the coup, the military promised to respect the 27 February 2022 election plan by the previous government. Regional bloc, the Economic Community of West African State (ECOWAS) and the African Union have suspended Mali from their organisations, but declined to impose further sanctions while repeatedly urging the authorities to hold the votes on schedule and promised more sanctions if there would be a delay.

It was announced in December that a conference would take place recommending a timetable for democratic elections. On 30 December it was announced that polls scheduled for February should be delayed by six months to five years in part because of security issues. A significant coalition of political parties in Mali rejected the military-led government's plans for a slow transition to democratic rule. The military plan said the transition could take up to five years. Under its plan, a constitutional referendum would be held in 2023 and legislative elections in 2025. A presidential election would not take place until 2026. ECOWAS, West Africa's main political and economic bloc, has imposed sanctions on the coup leaders and had promised more if Mali did not produce a plan for February elections by January. On 8 January it was announced that West African leaders would discuss Mali's postponement and prepare new sanctions. On 9 January ECOWAS said all member countries will close borders with Mali and impose sweeping economic sanctions in response to delays holding promised elections after a 2020 military coup. In a communique, ECOWAS said it found the proposed timetable for a transition totally unacceptable. This timetable “simply means that an illegitimate military transition government will take the Malian people hostage”, it said. The 15-member bloc said it had agreed to impose additional sanctions with immediate effect, including the closure of members’ land and air borders with Mali, the suspension of non-essential financial transactions, and the freezing of Malian state assets in ECOWAS central and commercial banks. Meanwhile, regional monetary union UEMOA instructed all financial institutions under its umbrella to suspend Mali with immediate effect, severing the country’s access to regional financial markets.

At the ECOWAS summit meeting in Accra on 3 July 2022, the junta agreed to hold elections by February 2024 in exchange for the immediate removal of sanctions.

In September 2023, after the breakdown of the truce with the Tuareg rebels, the Malian junta postponed the elections indefinitely due to "technical reasons" including the adoption of the new constitution, and a dispute with Idemia, a French company in charge of carrying out a census.

In May 2025, two opposition leaders were abducted by armed men claiming to be police officers following protests demanding a return to democracy. The government remained silent on the matter. The following week, the military junta ordered the dissolution of all political parties and organizations in the country. In July 2025, Mali's transitional parliament granted Assimi Goïta, who had ruled the country de facto since the 2021 coup, a five-year presidential term, renewable "as many times as necessary" without the need for elections.

== Electoral system ==
The president of Mali is elected by absolute majority vote using the two-round system to serve a five-year term.
