= Coupvolution =

Combination of a revolution and a coup d'état

A coupvolution or coup-volution is a portmanteau of a coup d'état and a revolution, in which regime change is carried out in support of a mass mobilisation against an existing government. The neologism was coined in 2011 by American military studies scholar Nathan Toronto, who used it to refer to the 2011 Egyptian revolution. The term has subsequently been used to refer to the 2014 Burkina Faso uprising, the 2019 Sudanese revolution and the 2021 Tunisian self-coup. More recently, Russian political scientist Andrey Korotayev has used the term to analyse the various coups that have taken place in the "Coup Belt".

== Characteristics ==
A coupvolution involves regime change, in which a coup is carried out in support of a revolutionary movement against an existing government. In the first phase of a coupvolution, a mass mobilisation of revolutionary proportions gives way to a coup d'état; and in the second phase, demands of the revolutionaries are realised by the post-coup regime. During a coupvolution, the military defects from supporting the government to supporting the political opposition and seizes power in the name of the revolutionary movement. Following a coupvolution, the military may either consolidate power for themselves or hand it to the opposition. The term draws from Timothy Garton Ash's own term "refolution", which he used to describe a mixture of reform and a revolutionary movement, in reference to the fall of Communism in the Eastern Bloc. It is comparable to the concept of a "coup from below".

== Cases ==
According to American political scientist Mark Beissinger, since 1900, roughly 12% of revolutions have consisted of coupvolutions. The Russian revolutionary Leon Trotsky believed that, in the event of an insurrection, the first task of revolutionaries was to bring the military over to their side. During the Xinhai Revolution of 1911, the Qing dynasty was overthrown by revolutionaries embedded in the New Army. In the Guatemalan Revolution of 1944, mass protests against the regime of Jorge Ubico culminated with dissident military officers seizing power. Russian political scientist Andrey Korotayev described both the 1966 Upper Voltan coup d'état and 1991 Malian coup d'état, the latter of which was carried out to establish democracy, as coupvolutions. Beissinger also depicted the 1985 Sudanese coup d'état, the 1986 People Power Revolution in the Philippines, and the 2002 Venezuelan coup attempt as coupvolutions. Since the end of the Cold War, the proportion of revolutions that have involved military coups has fallen by a half.

=== Egyptian Revolution (2011–2014) ===
The term "coupvolution" was coined by American military studies scholar Nathan Toronto to describe the 2011 Egyptian revolution. The revolution was the culmination of a period of widespread protests, which had resulted in the resignation of Hosni Mubarak and the transfer of power to the Supreme Council of the Armed Forces. Discontent with the newly-elected government of Mohamed Morsi then led to further mass protests. A subsequent coup d'état in 2013, claiming to fulfil the protestors' demands, deposed Morsi, in what has variously been described as a coupvolution or a counterrevolution. The 2013 coupvolution was rejected by Morsi's supporters, who protested against it in the streets, but these protests were violently suppressed by the military and no further collective action took place.

=== Subsequent examples ===
The 2012 Malian coup d'état was supported by mass protests and led to the formation of a transitional government. During the 2014 Burkina Faso uprising, mass protests by the People's Movement for Progress (MPP) against the government of Blaise Compaoré led to his ousting in a military coup, which brought about a return of civil government in the country. In 2017, Robert Mugabe was ousted in a coupvolution, after months of anti-government protests culminated in a coup d'état. In 2019, the Sudanese revolution culminated in a coup d'état, characterising it as a coupvolution. The 2019 Bolivian political crisis has also been characterised as a coupvolution. In 2021, anti-corruption protests in Tunisia culminated in a self-coup by President Kais Saied. Unlike most other coupvolutions, which culminated in military coups, the Tunisian coupvolution involved a constitutional coup.

=== Sahel coups (2020–2024) ===
In the early 2020s, years of confrontrations between governments of the Françafrique and opposition protestors culminated in a series of coupvolutions, particularly in the Sahel. In Mali, dissatisfaction with the conduct of the 2020 elections led to mass protests against Ibrahim Boubacar Keïta's government; the protestors cited a lack of political reform, economic downturn and the French military occupation of the country as motivating factors. Unlike earlier coupvolutions, Malian revolutionaries demanded order rather than democracy. By July, the protests had turned violent, with police killing several people and wounding more than 100 more. Protestors subsequently occupied government buildings, set fire to the National Assembly and blocked bridges and roads with burning tires. Protests continued into August, with protestors demanding the president's resignation. On 18 August, the demonstrations culminated in a Malian coup d'état by Assimi Goïta, who arrested the president and forced him to resign. The announcement of the coup, which they justified by alleging bad governance and corruption of the previous government, was celebrated by the demonstrators and condemned by the United Nations. Power was initially handed to a transitional civil government led by Bah Ndaw, but after he began to oppose the military's role in politics, Goïta ousted him in another coup d'état and consolidated power. Goita himself postponed the transition to democracy until 2024.

Since 2021, there have been 12 coups and coup attempts in the Sahel and West Africa, leading to political scientists describing the region as a "Coup Belt". Ineffective security policies from the African Union, ECOWAS and the European Union, as well as the exclusion of military officials from politics by civil governments, have been among the factors contributing to these coups, some of which took the form of coupvolutions. In 2022, Nigerien president Mohamed Bazoum announced that French counterinsurgency forces in the region would be hosted in Niger, provoking public opposition. Opposition groups formed the M62 Movement, which began protesting the French presence and the conduct of Bazoum's government. Confrontations between the opposition and the government culminated in the 2023 Nigerien coup d'état, in which Abdourahamane Tiani overthrew Bazoum and established the National Council for the Safeguard of the Homeland. This coupvolution, which came at the height of civil unrest, was supported by M62 and other opposition groups. Western media condemned the coup as an example of "democratic backsliding" and alleged Russian influence was behind it.

== Bibliography ==
- Beissinger, Mark R. (2022). The Revolutionary City: Urbanization and the Global Transformation of Rebellion. Princeton University Press. ISBN 9780691224763.
- Fain, Egor; Issaev, Leonid; Korotayev, Andrey (2024). "Coupvolution as a Mechanism of Regime Change in the Sahel". In Besenyő, János; Issaev, Leonid; Korotayev, Andrey (eds.). Terrorism and Political Contention: New Perspectives on North Africa and the Sahel Region. Springer. pp. 133–150. doi:10.1007/978-3-031-53429-4_7. ISBN 978-3-031-53428-7.
- Grimm, Jannis; Harders, Cilja (2017). "Unpacking the effects of repression: the evolution of Islamist repertoires of contention in Egypt after the fall of President Morsi". Social Movement Studies. 17 (1): 1–18. doi:10.1080/14742837.2017.1344547.
- Issaev, Leonid; Korotayev, Andrey (2022). "New Wave of Revolutions in the MENA Region in the Global Perspective". In Issaev, Leonid; Korotayev, Andrey (eds.). New Wave of Revolutions in the MENA Region: A Comparative Perspective. Springer. pp. 1–32. ISBN 978-3-031-15134-7.
- Korotayev, Andrey; Khokhlova, Alina (2022). "Revolutionary Events in Mali, 2020–2021". In Issaev, Leonid; Korotayev, Andrey (eds.). New Wave of Revolutions in the MENA Region: A Comparative Perspective. Springer. pp. 191–218. ISBN 978-3-031-15134-7.
- Korotayev, Andrey; Shishkina, Alisa (2024). "Arab Spring, Its Aftermath, and James Davies' Inverted J-Curve". Critical Sociology. 50 (1): 177–182. doi:10.1177/08969205231200490.
- Kostelyanets, Sergey (2022). "Sudan's December Revolution and the Demise of the Al Bashir Regime". In Issaev, Leonid; Korotayev, Andrey (eds.). New Wave of Revolutions in the MENA Region: A Comparative Perspective. Springer. pp. 33–56. ISBN 978-3-031-15134-7.
- Toronto, Nathan (2011). "Egypt's 'Coup-volution'". Middle East Insights (6): 1–3. Archived from the original on 26 April 2019.
- Wackenhut, Arne F. (2024). "Between (de-)mobilization, polarization, and transnational repression: the Egyptian diaspora in the wake of the January 25 uprising". Globalizations. 22: 66–80. doi:10.1080/14747731.2023.2300849.
