= Autonomous Special Forces Battalion =

- Bataillon Autonome des Forces Spéciales
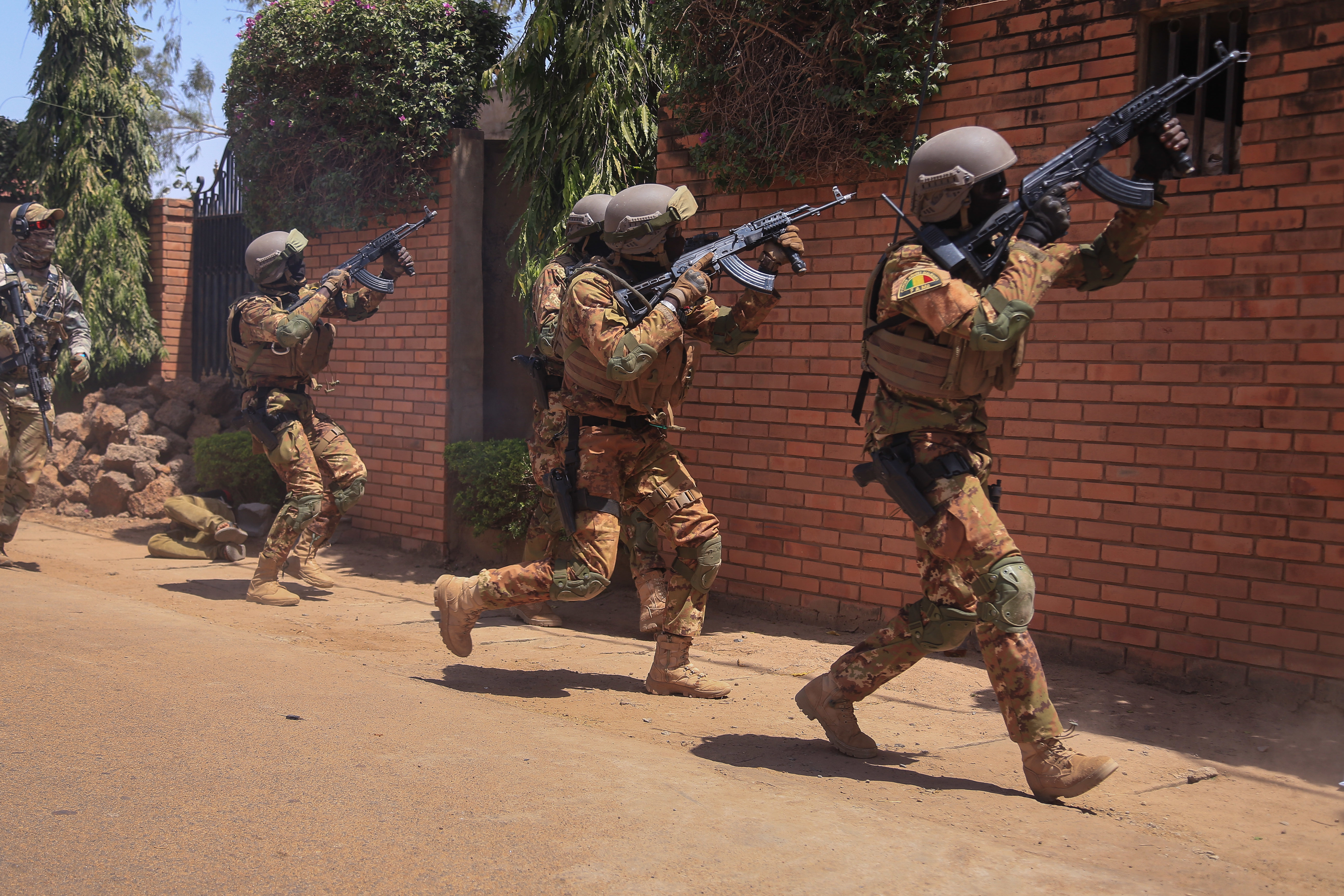
- Soldiers of the battalion practicing CQB in Ouagadougou, Burkina Faso on Feb. 26, 2019.
- Active: 16 May 2018; 8 years ago
- Country: Mali
- Allegiance: National Committee for the Salvation of the People
- Branch: Malian Army
- Type: Special operations force
- Role: Counterterrorism; Military intelligence Executive protection Unconventional warfare
- Garrison/HQ: Samanko (near Bamako), Koulikoro Region, Mali
- Beret color: Purple
- Engagements: War in the Sahel; Mali War; 2020 Malian coup d'état; 2021 Malian coup d'état; Moura massacre

Commanders
- Acting commander (as of 2022): Maj. Lassine Togola
- Notable commanders: Assimi Goïta

The Autonomous Special Forces Battalion (BAFS) (French: Bataillon Autonome des Forces Spéciales) is the primary special forces unit of the Malian Army. Under command of junta leader Assimi Goïta, the BAFS and other forces assisted both the 2020 and 2021 Malian coups.

The unit has also worked closely with Wagner Group in the Mali War and, by extension, the overarching War in the Sahel.

As of 2025, the battalion was slated to become an integral part of the army's newly formed Special Operations Command.

== Establishment and purpose ==
The Bataillon Autonome des Forces Spéciales et des Centres d'Aguerrissement was established by presidential decree (under Ibrahim Keïta) on 16 May 2018.

Under Article 3 of the decree, the battalion was to be responsible for planning, coordinating and conducting special operations, combatting terrorism in all its forms, Intelligence gathering and transmission, supplementing conventional forces when necessary, Protecting figures of authority, coordinating special forces activities when deployed, and developing and implementing training programs.

== Training ==
Basic operator training takes place in the Centre National d’Aguerrissement de Samanko. The facility is located in western Mali, specifically the Samako area of the Koulikoro Region. The Köppen climate classification for the area is tropical savanna, and the rural area is, like nearby Bamako, on the Niger River.

Special forces selections occur in yearly contingents. The graduating class of 2021-22 had 439 recruits finish training, who were then sworn in, in front of the national flag, by President Goïta on 22 December 2022.

As of 2022, prospective candidates must volunteer. First, they spend a month at local "Common Training Centers," and if selection is passed, they move on to Samanko for a duration of 6 months. During the cumulative 7 months, they familiarize themselves with combat tactics, shooting, sports, landmines, and explosives, among others. After graduation, operators are given the special forces beret, which is colored purple to represent traditional royalty and prestige.

== Moura massacre and controversy ==
Forces of the Autonomous Special Forces Battalion, alongside those from the Wagner Group and 33rd Parachute Commando Regiment (of Mali), perpetrated the Moura massacre in 2022. Following a multi-day engagement, Malian and Wagner soldiers descended on the townspeople, executing at minimum 500 civilians without clause. In addition to looting, around 58 women and girls were subject to sexual violence. Following the attack, efforts of individual Malian soldiers to expose the events were deliberately suppressed by the battalion.

In May 2023, the U.S. Department of State sanctioned the leaders of BAFS, Wagner, and the 33rd Regiment. Major Lassine Togola, acting commander of the battalion, received a visa restriction.

== See also ==
- Africa Corps
- Alliance of Sahel States
- Burkina Faso Armed Forces
- IS-SP
- ISWAP
- Coup Belt
