= Malick Diaw =

Malian politician

Général d'armée Malick Diaw
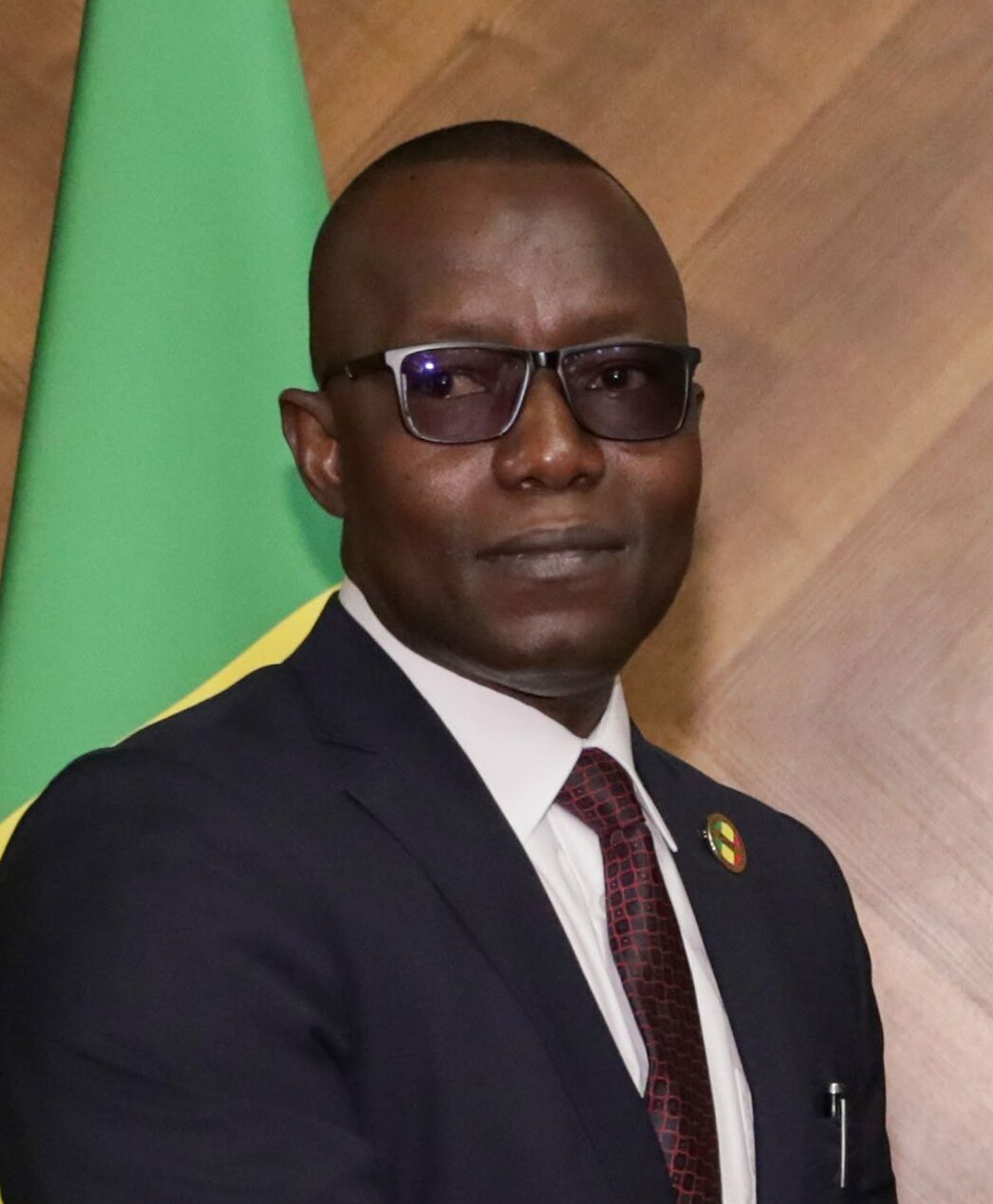
- Diaw in 2023

Vice President of Mali
- In office 19 August 2020 – 25 September 2020
- President: Assimi Goïta
- Prime Minister: Vacant
- Preceded by: Office established
- Succeeded by: Assimi Goïta

President of National Transitional Council of Mali
- Incumbent
- Assumed office 5 December 2020
- President: Bah Ndaw; Assimi Goïta
- Prime Minister: Moctar Ouane; Choguel Kokalla Maïga; Abdoulaye Maïga
- Preceded by: Office established (Moussa Timbiné as President of the National Assembly)

Personal details
- Born: c. 1979 (age 46–47) Ségou, Mali
- Education: Joint Military School in Koulikoro; Prytanée militaire de Kati

Military service
- Allegiance: Mali
- Branch/service: Malian Armed Forces
- Rank: Army general
- Unit: Autonomous Special Forces Battalion
- Battles/wars: Mali War

Malick Diaw (born c. 1979) is a Malian military officer and politician. He was one of the leaders of the National Committee for the Salvation of the People, the military junta that organized the 2020 Malian coup d'état. On December 5, 2020, he was elected president of the National Transitional Council of Mali, the de facto Malian legislative body.

== Biography ==
Colonel Malick Diaw was a student at the Prytanée militaire de Kati then joined the Joint Military School in Koulikoro in 1998. He became deputy director of the Prytanée militaire de Kati at the time of the coup. He was also Subjete of the General Staff of the National Guard in the 3rd Military Region of Kati.

As an artillery officer, he participated in the Mali War between 2013 and 2017.

He was one of the soldiers present at the massive rally to celebrate the fall of President Ibrahim Boubacar Keïta and is considered one of the masterminds of the 2020 Malian coup d'état that overthrew the president. He became second in command of the military junta led by Assimi Goïta, interim vice president in the transition of Mali. He also played a key role in negotiations with the Economic Community of West African States to lift sanctions in October. Like the other four members of the junta, he was promoted from colonel to army general.

Diaw was elected president of the National Transitional Council with 111 votes in favor and 7 abstentions, in a body in which the military occupies 22 of the 121 seats.

== International Sanctions ==
In February 2022, Diaw was placed on the EU's sanctions list by the EU Council. The decision was motivated by Diaw's direct and active role in the continued obstruction of Mali's transition to democracy.
