= Malian coup d'état =

Malian coup d'état may refer to:

- 2021 Malian coup d'état
- 2020 Malian coup d'état
- 2012 Malian coup d'état
- 1991 Malian coup d'état
- 1968 Malian coup d'état
