= 2020 Malian protests =

Protests in Mali

- Part of the Mali War
- Date: 5 June – 19 August 2020
- Location: Bamako, Mali; 12°39'0"N, 8°0'0"W.
- Caused by: 2020 Malian parliamentary election; Corruption; Violence by Islamists in Azawad; Government handling of the COVID-19 pandemic
- Goals: Resignation of President Ibrahim Boubacar Keïta; Dissolution of the National Assembly
- Methods: Protests; Riots; Strike action
- Result: 2020 Malian coup d'état; Resignation of the President, Ibrahim Boubacar Keïta, and the Prime Minister, Boubou Cissé, along with the entire cabinet; Dissolution of the National Assembly; Assimi Goïta is appointed as the new Head of State; Mahmoud Dicko leaves politics

Parties
Protesters and dissidents of the government; 5 June movement; Opposition parties; (Mali) National Committee for the Salvation of the People: Elements of the Malian Armed Forces	Government of Mali: Rally for Mali; Malian Armed Forces; Pro-government protestors

Lead figures
(no centralized leadership) (Mali) Assimi Goïta (Mali) Ismaël Wagué	Ibrahim Boubacar Keïta (surrendered) (President of Mali); Boubou Cissé (surrendered) (Prime Minister of Mali); Tiéna Coulibaly (Minister of Defence); Moussa Timbiné (President of the National Assembly)

Deaths and injuries
- Deaths: at least 11
- Injuries: 124

Protests in Mali began on 5 June 2020 when protesters gathered in the streets of Bamako, calling for Ibrahim Boubacar Keïta to resign as president of Mali. The protests ended after a coup d'état on 18 August 2020. Both the president and prime minister of Mali were detained that afternoon, and in the evening they announced their resignations.

== Timeline ==
=== Background ===
Numerous factors led to the formation of the 5 June Movement and the August coup d’etat.

Tensions had been seething ever since irregularities were reported during the 2018 Malian presidential election. The on-going Mali War in the Tuareg-controlled northern region intensified the situation. Human Rights Watch (HRW) reports have documented army abuses against civilians in the central Mopti and Segou regions, dozens of attacks by armed groups in 2019 that resulted in 456 civilian deaths and hundreds of injuries. Another twelve people were killed due to dissident Fulani in Mopti attacks in April.

Dissidents also questioned the government's handling of the COVID-19 pandemic. The first two cases were reported on 25 March 2020, and by the end of May, there were 1,265 cases and 77 deaths.

=== The First round of the 2020 elections ===
After repeated postponements, the first round of the 2020 Parliamentary election was finally held on 29 March 2020. Opposition leader Soumaïla Cissé and members of his electoral team were kidnapped by jihadists three days before the election. He was released on 6 October. Polling stations were ransacked, village leaders were kidnapped, and a roadside bomb killed nine people including three soldiers on election day, 29 March. Voter turnout was only 12% in Bamako.

=== The Second round of the 2020 elections ===
At least 25 soldiers were killed in an attack on a military base in the northern town of Bamba, Gao Region, on 6 April, and concerns about violence dominated the second round of the elections.

Incidents on 19 April prevented some people from casting votes, and on 30 April the Constitutional Court overturned the results in 31 districts, giving Rally for Mali, which is led by President Ibrahim Boubacar Keïta, ten more seats than originally expected. Opposition parties led by Iman Mahmoud Dicko established the Mouvement du 5 Juin - Rassemblement des forces patriotiques (English: 5 June Movement - Rally of Patriotic Forces) on 30 May, and thousands took to the streets in protest on 5 June.

French forces fought the Battle of Talahandak, killing Abdelmalek Droukdel of al-Qaeda in the Islamic Maghreb near Tessalit, Kidal Region, 20 kilometres (12 mi) from the Mali-Algeria border.

Boubou Cisse was reappointed Prime Minister on 11 June, when he was instructed to form a new government.

Tens of thousands of Malians protested again on 19 June, demanding the resignation of President Keïta.

On 20 June, the Economic Community of West African States (ECOWAS) called for new elections to be held.

President Ibrahim Boubacar Keïta and Imam Mahmoud Dicko met on 5 July, but the opposition continued to call for civil disobedience to force Keïta's resignation and the dissolution of Parliament.

Protests turned violent on 10 July. For the next three days, protesters in Bamako clashed with security forces, and security forces reportedly fired live rounds at the protesters, killing at least 11 and injuring 124.

On 23 July, Presidents Muhammadu Buhari (Nigeria), Mahamadou Issoufou (Niger), Nana Akufo-Addo (Ghana), Alassane Ouattara (Côte d'Ivoire), and Macky Sall (Senegal) arrived in Bamako to meet with President Keïta and opposition leaders after a failed ECOWAS mediation mission.

On 27 July, ECOWAS called for the creation of a unity government and warned of sanctions.

Nine new judges, said to be Keïta supporters, were appointed to the Constitutional Court on 10 August, in response to ECOWAS' demands for reform.

Thousands gathered in Independence Square in Bamako on 11 August, where they were met with tear gas and water cannons.

The opposition announced daily protests starting 17 August.

=== Coup d’etat ===
Mutinying soldiers arrested President Ibrahim Boubacar Keïta and Prime Minister Boubou Cissé after taking over a military camp near Bamako on the morning of 18 August.

Early in the morning of 19 August, President Ibrahim Boubacar Keïta announced his resignation and dissolved parliament. Mahmoud Dicko announced that he was leaving politics. Colonel Assimi Goïta is appointed to head the new government, the Comité national pour le salut du peuple (in French) (National Committee for the Salvation of the People, CNSP).
