= 2023 Sierra Leone coup plot =

Coup plot in Sierra Leone

On 31 July 2023, Sierra Leonean authorities detained an undetermined number of soldiers and civilians who were allegedly planning a coup in Sierra Leone between 7 and 10 August against the government of Julius Maada Bio. While not explicitly using the term "coup," the police expressed their concern that despite ongoing endeavors to solidify the achieved peace and democratic progress, specific individuals persist in engaging in actions intended to disrupt the harmony and serenity of the nation. On 8 August, it was confirmed that the police arrested 19 people, including fourteen serving personnel of the Republic of Sierra Leone Armed Forces, two officers of the Sierra Leone Police, one retired chief superintendent of police and two other people, all of them accused of "state subversion". In addition, five military officers and three police officers were issued with a search and capture warrant.

The arrested retired chief superintendent, identified as Mohamed Yetey Turay, was detained between 5 and 6 August in Liberia, at the request of the Sierra Leone government. An extradition was granted. The fourteen armed forces officers arrested turned out to be eight middle-level officers and six non-commissioned officers, without revealing the specific ranks.

The fact that the government did not give more names of those arrested or their ranks led critics of Bio's government to conclude that there was no plot and that it was an excuse to repress the opposition, who rejected the electoral results in the past elections denouncing irregularities and violations of the electoral process.

On 15 August, police revealed the names and faces of 9 people, including military and police personnel and civilians, wanted for "Conspiracy to Commit Felony to wit, Subversion."

== 2023 Sierra Leone Military Barracks Attack ==
On November 26, 2023, unidentified gunmen attacked the central prison in Freetown, along with the presidential palace and an armory. A smaller attack occurred in Murray Town, where the Sierra Leonean navy is located. Julius Maada Bio declared a national curfew, and later thirteen officials were arrested in the attempted coup.

== See also ==
- Coup Belt
- 1992 Sierra Leonean coup d'état
- List of coups and coup attempts
- List of coups and coup attempts since 2010
- 2022 Democratic Republic of the Congo coup d'état allegations
- 2023 Nigerien coup d'état
- 2023 Gabonese coup d'état
