= Ismaël Wagué =

Malian military officer and politician

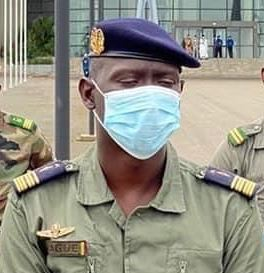

Spokesman for the National Committee for the Salvation of the People
- Incumbent
- Assumed office 19 August 2020
- Leader: Assimi Goïta
- Preceded by: Position established

Military service
- Allegiance: Mali
- Branch/service: Malian Air Force

Ismaël Wagué is a Malian military officer serving as the Deputy Chief of Staff of the Malian Air Force of the Malian Armed Forces.

After the 2020 Malian coup d'état, he became spokesperson for the National Committee for the Salvation of the People. Wagué gave an interview on France 24, wherein he claimed that the actions of the Malian military was not a coup. He has also pledged that the National Committee for the Salvation of the People will seek a leader to transition Mali from military to civilian rule.

Colonel-Major Ismaël Wagué was appointed to the position of Deputy Chief of Staff of the Air Force in 2019 by president Ibrahim Boubacar Keïta after a series of dismissals in response to a terrorist attack that killed 26 soldiers in Northern Mali.

== International sanctions ==
On February 4, 2022, Wagué was targeted with sanctions by the EU Council, given his position in President Assimi Goïta's inner circle and direct responsibility for obstructing and undermining Mali's political transition to a democratic civilian-led government.
