= Thierno Hady Boubacar Thiam =

Thierno Hady Boubacar Thiam (died December 11, 2017) was a Malian Tijaniyyah ulama. He was elected president of the High Islamic Council of Mali in 2002 with the support of President Alpha Oumar Konaré. He was considered a moderate, and his goals as president included maintaining the apolitical nature of the Council and uniting various Muslim groups within Mali. In 2008, Mahmoud Dicko succeeded him as president.
