= 2022 Democratic Republic of the Congo coup d'état allegations =

Ongoing crisis in the Democratic Republic of the Congo

2022 Democratic Republic of the Congo coup d'état attempt
- Map of the Democratic Republic of the Congo
Date	8 February 2022
Location	Democratic Republic of the Congo
Result	Coup d'état failed

Belligerents
Government of the Democratic Republic of the Congo	Unknown

Commanders and leaders
Félix Tshisekedi	Unknown

On February 8, 2022, Félix Tshisekedi, the president of the Democratic Republic of the Congo, reported a coup d'état. The reports of a coup emerged when Tshisekedi was attending the African Union summit in Addis Ababa, of which he is the chairperson. The reports caused Tshisekedi to leave the summit early to deal with the internal conflict in his country.

== Background ==
Since 2020, the greater African region has experienced waves of coup attempts, which began with the 2020 coup in Mali, and more recently in 2022 in Burkina Faso, as well as a failed coup attempt in Guinea-Bissau. The coup wave became one of the main topics of discussion in the 35th African Union Summit. On 2 February 2022, 50 people were killed in a militia attack.

== Coup attempt ==
In February 2022, President Félix Tshisekedi was heading to Addis Ababa to attend the 35th African Union Summit. Tshisekedi was serving as chairperson of the Summit, though his term was nearing its end. During the summit, Tshisekedi received a report that there were indications that his country was facing a national security threat. This led Tshisekedi to leave the summit abruptly in order to deal with the national security issues in his country. After the reports of the threat, Presidential spokesman Tharcisse Kasongo Mwema addressed the country on national television, stating that the government had found "evidence" of national security threat. Mwema also stated that an investigation was ongoing and that any attempts to destabilize the country would not be tolerated.

On February 9, Tshisekedi's security aide, François Beya was reportedly arrested, according to a report from Georges Kapiamba, president of the Congolese Association for Access to Justice (ACAJ). In the report, Kapiamba claimed he met Beya during his detention and that Beya had denied all the allegations against him. Union for Democracy and Social Progress legislator Auguy Kalonji said that the country has "escaped" the coup without clarifying the plotter.

== See also ==
- 2011 Democratic Republic of the Congo coup d'état attempt
- 2020 Malian coup d'état
- January 2022 Burkina Faso coup d'état
- 2022 Guinea-Bissau coup d'état attempt
