= 2021–2022 Somali political crisis =

Crisis in Somalia

- Date: 8 February 2021 – 10 January 2022
- Location: Somalia
- Result: Deal to hold 2022 Somali presidential election

Parties
Government	Political Opposition; Protestors

Lead figures
Mohamed Abdullahi Mohamed	Mohamed Hussein Roble

The 2021–2022 Somali political crisis was a major political crisis and turmoil within the Somali government after President Mohamed Abdullahi Mohamed's term ended on 8 February 2021. Parliamentary elections held during 2021, but were not completed during the year. Prime Minister Mohamed Hussein Roble opposed the president's decision, and called for him to step down. Following months of protests, a deal was struck in January 2022 to hold elections in February. After a delay, presidential elections were ultimately held in May which resulted in President Mohamed Abdullahi Mohamed losing his bid for reelection to Hassan Sheikh Mohamud.

== Developments ==
Political turmoil escalated, with anti-government protests occurring after the government's decision to delay the 2021 Somali presidential election. The protests were attended by supporters of the opposition, waving and holding the Somali flag and calling for the government to resign from office. Tensions rose when heavy gunfire was reported during demonstrations on 19–20 February in Mogadishu. The protesters were aiming to stage protest rallies over the next weeks and call for the 2021 Somali presidential election to be scheduled as quick as possible to end the political crisis and turmoil.

On 12 April, the lower house of the Federal Parliament of Somalia voted to extend the president's term for another two years. This led to army factions loyal to President Mohamed and factions loyal to Prime Minister Mohammed Hussein Roble briefly seizing rival positions in Mogadishu.

On 27 December, President Mohamed announced the suspension of Prime Minister Roble's powers for suspected corruption, which was described by Roble as a coup attempt. The next day, hundreds of soldiers loyal to Roble armed with RPGs and machine guns encircled the presidential palace.

On 10 January, Somali leaders announced they struck a deal to complete parliamentary elections by February 25, after repeated delays that have threatened the stability of the country. The agreement was reached after several days of talks hosted by Roble with state leaders aimed at ending an impasse over the polls.

== Reactions ==
On 27 December 2021, the US, EU, UN, and African Union Mission to Somalia released a joint declaration voicing "deep concerns" on the events in Somalia.

== See also ==
- Constitutional crisis in Somalia
- 2021 protests in Chad
