= High Islamic Council of Mali =

Islamic organization in Mali

The High Islamic Council of Mali (HCIM; Haut Conseil islamique malien) is an organization created in January 2002 that brings together religious organizations and leaders responsible for interfacing with authorities.

The council is headed by a president from the national executive board elected for a five-year term.

Thierno Hady Boubacar Thiam, a moderate ulama who represented the Malikite majority, led the organization from 2003 to 2008.

Salafi Mahmoud Dicko led the council from 2008 to 2019. At the end of his first term in 2014, Dicko was re-elected with 59 votes as compared to 27 for his competitor Thierno Hady Oumar Thiam.

Since April 2019, the council has been led by the Malikite Chérif Ousmane Madani Haïdara. Haïdara had been the council's vice president beginning in 2002, when the council was created.
