= 2022 Guinea-Bissau coup attempt =

Attempted overthrow of President Umaro Sissoco Embaló

2022 Guinea-Bissau coup d'état attempt
- Part of the Coup Belt
- Map of Guinea-Bissau
Date	1 February 2022
Location	Bissau, Guinea-Bissau
Result	Coup d'état failed; President Umaro Sissoco Embaló says the coup was a "failed attack against democracy".; None of the main targets killed during the coup d'état.

Belligerents
Government of Guinea-Bissau	Unknown

Commanders and leaders
Umaro Sissoco Embaló	Unknown

Casualties and losses
2+ guards killed	4+ attackers killed
- 11 dead in total including 6 from the military

A coup d'état was attempted in Guinea-Bissau on 1 February 2022. A few hours later, president Umaro Sissoco Embaló declared the coup over, he said that "many" members of the security forces had been killed in a "failed attack against democracy".

The president Umaro Sissoco Embaló told the AFP news agency in a telephone call that "All is well", and added that the situation is "under control". He said that the failed coup attempt may have been linked to drug trade and was also an assassination attempt, "It wasn't just a coup. It was an attempt to kill the president, the prime minister and all the cabinet." He also stated that the army was not involved in the failed coup.

== Background ==
Coups d'états have been a significant issue in Guinea-Bissau. Since the first one in November 1980, there have been:

- Two successful coups in 2003 and 2012;
- Eight attempted coups before 2022;
- One military unrest, in 2010;
- Two notable allegations of a coup attempt, in 2019 and 2020.
- A successful coup in 2025

== Coup ==
Armed men surrounded the government palace on 1 February 2022, where President Umaro Sissoco Embaló and Prime Minister Nuno Gomes Nabiam were believed to have gone to attend a cabinet meeting. The state broadcaster reported that the shooting damaged the government palace, which is located close to the airport, and that "invaders" were holding government officials. Al Jazeera reporter, Nicolas Haque, said it was unclear whether the gunfire was the presidential guards trying to protect the president, or if there was an attack on the government palace. Portugal’s foreign affairs minister said that Embaló was at his official residence, but it was not clear if the attack on the government was over. "The latest information I have is positive given that the president is already at his palace, at his official residence ... but we still don’t know if the attack is over," Augusto Santos Silva said in an interview with Portuguese broadcaster RTP.

President Embaló told AFP news agency in a telephone call: "All is well" and added that the situation is "under control". The government announced Embaló would speak to the nation from the government palace on the evening of 1 February and invited reporters to attend the speech there. He announced that "many" members of the security forces had been killed in a "failed attack against democracy". He stated that attackers had tried to enter the government compound just after the cabinet meeting but had been successfully repelled. He described the coup as an assassination attempt, "It wasn't just a coup. It was an attempt to kill the president, the prime minister and all the cabinet." He added that the attack "was well prepared and organised and could also be related to people involved in drug trafficking", giving no further details. He suggested in a video that the army was not involved in the coup attempt. "I can assure you that no camp joined this attempted coup. It was isolated. It is linked to people we have fought against," he said, without elaborating.

On 2 February, life was slowly returning to Bissau's streets as businesses and banks reopened. Soldiers, on the other hand, were patrolling the streets and blocking entry to the Palace of Government complex, where the incident occurred. According to the military source, a large dragnet has been created by a panel of inquiry, and military intelligence personnel are collecting intelligence at government headquarters.

== Reactions ==
Economic Community of West African States (ECOWAS) said in a statement, "ECOWAS condemns the coup attempt and holds the military responsible for the physical integrity of President Umaro Sissoco Embaló and members of his government. ECOWAS asks the military to return to their barracks and maintain a republican posture." The African Union also condemned the 'attempted coup'. President of the African Union Commission, Moussa Faki Mahamat, called "on the military to return to their barracks without delay and to protect the physical safety of President Umaro Sissoco Embaló and members of his government and to immediately free those of them who are in detention." A 600-member military force was sent into Guinea-Bissau by ECOWAS with the aim of ensuring stability, effectively reinstating an earlier force that had operated in the country from the 2012 Guinea-Bissau coup d'état until September 2020.

== See also ==
- 2012 Guinea-Bissau coup d'état
- 2021 Guinean coup d'état
- 2021 Malian coup d'état
- January 2022 Burkina Faso coup d'état
