= Chérif Ousmane Madani Haïdara =

Malian religious leader

Sheikh Chérif Ousmane Madani Haïdara is a religious figure in Mali who has been the president of the High Islamic Council of Mali since April 2019. He is a follower of the Maliki school of Islam and a Sufi.

In 1991, Haïdara established the Sufi-based Islamic movement Ansar Dine (also written Ançar Dine) - not to be confused with the terrorist organization Ansar Dine operating in the north of Mali. The movement is strong in southern Mali, the Ivory Coast, Burkina Faso, and with Malian diaspora.
