= Mahmoud Dicko =

Malian imam and political leader (born c. 1954)

Mahmoud Dicko (Arabic: محمود ديكو; born around 1954) is a Malian Salafi imam from the Tombouctou Region who chaired the High Islamic Council of Mali (Haut Conseil islamique malien, HCIM) from January 2008 to April 2019.

A politico-religious leader considered in 2020 one of the most influential people in Mali, though he has never run for public office, Dicko served as mediator between the Malian government and jihadist groups in the north of the country. After supporting Ibrahim Boubacar Keïta in the 2013 election, he started supporting the opposition in 2017.

On 7 September 2019, he started his own movement called Coordination of Movements, Associations and Sympathizers (Coordination des Mouvements, Associations et Sympathisants, CMAS). In 2019 and 2020, he called for several important demonstrations against President Keïta.

== Biography ==
Dicko is Fulani. A former Arabic professor, trained in Saudi Arabia and Mauritania, Dicko became imam of the Salam mosque of Badalabougou in the early 1980s. A quietist Salafi, he considers himself a Sunni and not a Wahhabite. He was secretary general of the Malian Association for the Unity and Progress of Islam (Association Malienne pour l’Unité et la Progrès de l’Islam; AMUPI).

Dicko rejects jihad and the most violent rules of Sharia law. He also views Mali's pre-Islamic traditions as important.

In 2009, he opposed the draft personal and family code proposed by the government and with the mobilization of his followers succeeded in eliminating provisions of the code that were favorable to women's rights. In 2012, during the Mali War, he took a stand in favor of dialogue with Islamists and met with Iyad Ag Ghali, the leader of Ansar Dine. In 2013, he stated that the intervention of the French army in Mali, in support of the Malian army against armed jihadist groups, was not an aggression against Islam, saying that France had come to the aid of a people in distress, who had been abandoned by Muslim countries to their own fate. During the 2013 Malian presidential election, he supported the candidacy of Ibrahim Boubacar Keïta.

In November 2015, after a terrorist attack on a Bamako hotel, Dicko stated on VOA that the terrorists were sent by God to punish Mali for the promotion of homosexuality, which had been imported from the West. In December 2015, at the Grand Mosque of Bamako, he stated that jihadism was a creation of the West and of France with the goal of "recolonizing Mali".

On 30 October 2016, Dicko announced that he had received, after eight months of discussions, a letter from Iyad Ag Ghaly in which Ag Ghaly announced "the end of attacks throughout the territory". But Ansar Dine denied these statements on 2 November.

After having supported Keïta, Dicko moved to the opposition around the end of 2017. At his urging, 30,000-50,000 people demonstrated against the government in Bamako on 5 April 2019. On 7 September 2019, as others speculated about his presidential ambitions, he launched CMAS, a political movement that follows his Islamist line. As his influence grew, some analysts viewed him as a contender to win Mali's presidency in the 2023 election.

In June 2020, the CMAS united with the 5 June Movement/Gathering of Patriotic Forces (Mouvement du 5 juin / Rassemblement des Forces Patriotiques, M5-RFP). According to Aly Tounkara's analysis, "Many opponents who would have had no chance of gaining power have decided to rely on the imam and his thousands of followers, giving him great political power". On 19 June 2020, he organized a demonstration of tens of thousands of faithful and supporters to ask the President, Ibrahim Boubacar Keïta, to resign. On 10 July, during the third day of mobilization, clashes occurred, causing several deaths; leaders of the opposition coalition were arrested and then released.

On 18 August, during a coup d'état, Keïta and the Prime Minister, Boubou Cissé, were arrested by a military garrison. A few hours later, the President of the Republic, still detained by the army in a military camp, announced his resignation as well as the dissolution of the government and of the Parliament. On 19 August, Dicko announced that he was leaving politics. Nevertheless, he campaigned actively against the new constitution put to a referendum in June 2023.

On February 17, 2024, supporters of Imam Mahmoud Dicko created Synergy of Action for Mali, a coalition of parties and associations opposing the Malian junta.

On March 6, 2024, the Malian government dissolved the Association called “Coordination of Movements, Associations and Sympathizers of Imam Mahmoud Dicko” (CMAS). The coordinator of this association, Youssouf Daba Diawara, was arrested in July 2024.
