= 2021 protests in Chad =

- Date: February 6, 2021 – May 8, 2021
- Location: Chad
- Caused by: Alleged electoral fraud during the 2021 Chadian presidential election; Military rule after Idriss’s death
- Goals: Resignation of President Mahamat Déby; New general elections
- Methods: demonstrations, road-blocks
- Result: Protests suppressed by force; Succession of President Idriss Deby by his son; Fraudulent results of 2021 elections

Deaths and injuries
- Deaths: 13
- Injuries: 50

The 2021 protests in Chad were protests in Chad that started with the nomination and later election victory in the 2021 Chadian presidential election by Idriss Déby, who had ruled the country for over 20 years following the 1990 Chadian coup d'état. Protests continued after Idriss Déby was killed in action by FACT fighters in April 2021, with his son, Mahamat Déby, then dissolving the government and establishing the military-backed Transitional Military Council.

== Background ==
Chad has been in the midst of an armed conflict, with conflicting clashes and violence in Chad being very frequent. Opponents of then-president Idriss Deby had called for protests because of his undemocratic rule and dictatorship-style leadership of Chad, with human rights being a common issue and struggle for many in Chad, yet suffering high rates of unemployment and poverty and the struggles to handle the Coronavirus.

== Protests ==
On 6 February, hundreds of protesters set fire to throes during protests against the re-election nomination of president Idriss Deby, in N’Djamena, as a response, police fired teargas to disperse them.

On February 28, Opposition leader Yaya Dillo says his mother, son, and three other members of his family were killed in a pre-dawn raid on his house led by the president's son. A government spokesperson said that Dillo had failed to respond to two judicial mandates, and that two people were killed and five injured, including three police officers.

On 20 March, thousands of protesters took part in several marches and rallies in support of the opposition candidates. Political parties and civil society associations had called for demonstrations against a sixth term of President Marshal Idriss Déby Itno.

Civil servants and political organisations organised several rallies on 27 March to protest the upcoming election, calling for people to boycott it, chanting No to the 6th term! No to the 6th term!, or Non au 6e mandat ! Non au 6e mandat ! in N’Djamena. Manifestants also were arrested and beaten by police as soon as they started protesting, resulting in burning tyres.

On 27 April 2021, protests erupted in N'Djamena, asking the Transitional Military Council to concede to civilian transition. A woman was killed in the capital when anti-military protesters attacked a bus, while a man was killed in the south of the country. Police have used tear gas to disperse demonstrations whereas the TMC has banned protests. Opposition politicians have labelled the TMC takeover as a "coup". On 2 May 2021, the TMC lifted a nighttime curfew imposed in the country in the aftermath of President Déby's death. The TMC also acknowledged the deaths of six protesters during demonstrations in the past week.

Chadian security forces used tear gas and batons to disperse protesters who took to the streets of the capital N'Djamena on Wednesday to denounce a military takeover following the battlefield death of President Idriss Deby. Small groups of protesters burned tyres and French flags, and some clashed violently with police, a Reuters reporter at the scene said. About 30 people were arrested, according to civil society coalition Wakit Tamma on 19 May.

== See also ==
- 2021 Somali political crisis
