= Joint Military School (Mali) =

Malian training establishment

- École militaire interarmes de Koulikoro
- Type: Military academy
- Established: 1 October 1962; 63 years ago
- Location: Koulikoro

The Joint Military School (French: École militaire interarmes de Koulikoro) at Koulikoro is one of two significant training establishments of the Malian Armed Forces. Its mission is to train active and reserve officers and the promotion of scientific and technological research.

== History ==
It was established on 1 October 1962 in Kati. In 1964 and 1965, the school trained fighters from several African national liberation movements: African National Congress of South Africa, SWAPO, FRELIMO, MPLA, and ZANU. On July 27, 1967, President Modibo Keita visited the School, and described its personnel as "the most conscious and most dynamic forward force". In 1980, 18 years after its establishment, it was relocated. The duration of the training cycle was reduced from three to two years after the 42nd graduation in 2020. In order to contribute to African integration, it opened its doors to military students from different African countries in 1993. It was reorganized on 17 November 2000.

== Activities ==
In a speech on 1 August 2008 at a ceremony at the school, then-President Amadou Toumani Toure formulated this new mission as follows: “The duty of the army is to fight, and the main mission is, above all, to support peace". A section of the European Union Training Mission in Mali is based at the school. Malian figures, politicians generals and foreign officials such as President of Chad Idriss Déby have presided over the graduation of troops. Since 1993, military personnel from 12 African countries have been training in it: Burkina Faso, Benin, Cameroon, Gabon, Guinea, Mauritania, Niger, Central African Republic, Côte d'Ivoire, Senegal, Chad and Togo.

== Alumni ==
- Amadou Toumani Touré, former President of Mali
- Cheick Oumar Diarra, former Minister of Transport and Public Works
- Kafougouna Koné, former Minister of Defense of Mali
- Bah Ndaw, President of Mali (Interim)
- Sadio Gassama, former Minister of Defence and Veterans Affairs
- Assimi Goïta, current President of Mali
- Sadio Camara, former Malian Minister of Defence.
