= Bah Ndaw =

President of Mali from 2020 to 2021

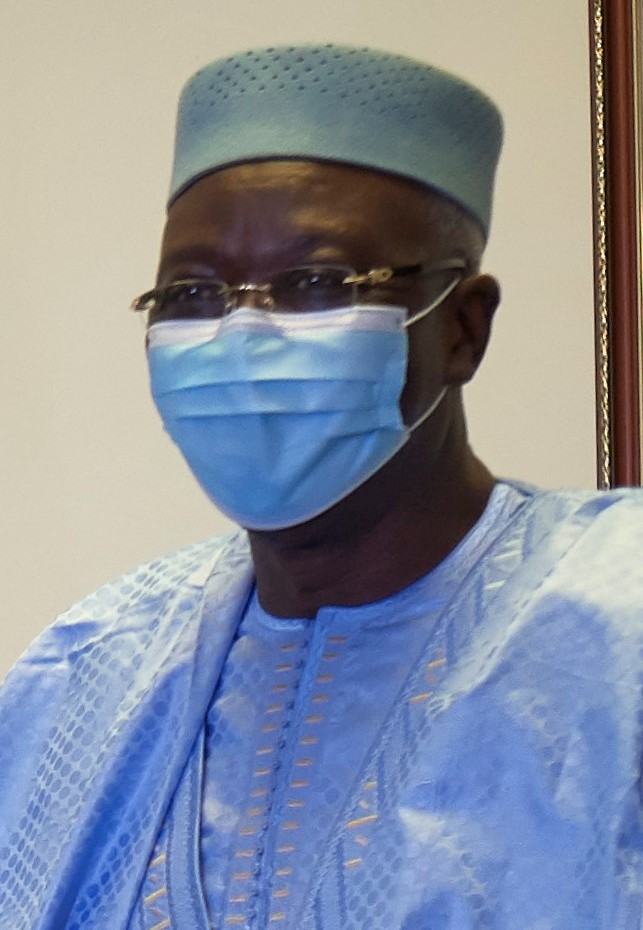
- Ndaw in 2021

Interim President of Mali
- In office 25 September 2020 – 24 May 2021 (Note: Did lead until 18 January 2021 the National Committee for the Salvation of the People.)
- Prime Minister: Moctar Ouane (acting)
- Vice President: Assimi Goïta
- Preceded by: Ibrahim Boubacar Keïta; Assimi Goïta (Note: as Chairman of the National Committee for the Salvation of the People)
- Succeeded by: Assimi Goïta

Minister of Defense and Veterans Affairs
- In office 28 May 2014 – 10 January 2015
- President: Ibrahim Boubacar Keïta
- Prime Minister: Moussa Mara
- Preceded by: Soumeylou Boubèye Maïga
- Succeeded by: Tiéman Hubert Coulibaly

Personal details
- Born: 23 August 1950 (age 76) San, French Sudan (present-day Mali)
- Party: Independent
- Education: École Militaire Interarmes, Koulikoro; École de guerre

Military service
- Allegiance: Mali
- Branch/service: Malian Air Force
- Years of service: 1973–2012
- Rank: Colonel
- Battles/wars: Agacher Strip War

Bah Ndaw (also spelled N'Daw, N'Dah, and N'Daou; born 23 August 1950) is a Malian retired military officer and politician who served as the interim president of Mali from 2020 to 2021, when he was deposed in a coup. He previously served as the Minister of Defense and Veterans Affairs in the government of President Ibrahim Boubacar Keïta from 2014 to 2015.

== Early life and education ==
Ndaw was born on 23 August 1950 in San, Mali. He joined the Malian Armed Forces as a volunteer in 1973 and graduated from the Joint Military School (EMIA) in Koulikoro the same year. In 1974 he was sent to the Soviet Union to receive helicopter training.

== Military and political career ==
In 1977, Ndaw became a member of the Malian Air Force. At one point Ndaw served as an aide-de-camp to Malian President Moussa Traoré. He resigned from this position in 1990 in protest of interference by Traoré's wife with government affairs. Under President Alpha Oumar Konaré Ndaw served as deputy chief of staff of the Malian Air Force between 1992 and 2002. In 1994, he graduated from the École de guerre in Paris, France. In 2003, Ndaw became chief of staff of the Malian Air Force. During his career he also served as deputy chief of staff of the Malian National Guard. From 2008 until his retirement in 2012, he was head of the Bureau for veterans' affairs and war victims. He retired with the rank of Colonel-major.

On 28 May 2014, Ndaw succeeded Soumeylou Boubèye Maïga as Minister of Defense under President Ibrahim Boubacar Keïta. During his time in office he signed a defense agreement with France. He also worked on a reorganization of the Malian Armed Forces. When Prime Minister Modibo Keita took over from Moussa Mara in January 2015 Ndaw left office, supposedly for disagreeing with some conditions regarding the integration of deserting former combatants stipulated by the Treaty of Algiers (2015).

=== Transitional interim president ===
On 21 September 2020, after the coup d'état a few weeks before, Ndaw was named president by a group of 17 electors. Assimi Goïta was appointed vice president. Their interim government was scheduled to preside over a period of 18 months after the 2020 Malian coup d'état. A spokesperson for political-religious leader Mahmoud Dicko praised his nomination as president. Leaders of the M5-RFP, active since the 2020 Malian protests, also signalled support.

Ndaw was inaugurated on 25 September. Upon becoming president, he refused to grant his wife the title of First Lady to prevent family members from being involved in public affairs. After officially assuming office Ndaw stated he would fight against corruption, electoral fraud and to respect previously made international agreements. He also indicated that he would continue the fight against terrorist forces and prevent abuse of civilians by the Malian armed forces.

A transition cannot do everything. It must set priorities. Public money is sacred and I will ensure that it is spent, in a traceable and reasonable way. I can't promise zero corruption but I will do everything to make zero impunity the norm. The proper management of our resources, of our meagre resources is, in fact, an obligation. This will be a project of the transition.

— Ndaw during his inauguration, Maliweb

Following Ndaw's inauguration, Jean-Claude Brou, the President of Economic Community of West African States (ECOWAS) Commission, stated that ECOWAS would only lift the embargo against Mali if a civilian Prime Minister was appointed by Ndaw. On 27 September Ndaw named Moctar Ouane as Prime Minister.

While he was president tensions were high between his government and the military since the handover of power in September. This led to rebel soldiers arresting Keïta and Cissé at gunpoint. The opposition M5 movement, which had spearheaded the 2020 Malian protests against Keïta, publicly called for the interim government to be dissolved and replaced with a "more legitimate" one. On 14 May, the government announced plans for a new, "broad-based" cabinet.

On 24 May 2021, Ndaw and Ouane were detained by the military and taken to Kati military base nearby Malian capital Bamako. The next day, the UN Secretary-General António Guterres called for their immediate release. On 26 May, Ndaw announced his resignation.

== Post-presidency (2021-present) ==
On 27 August 2021, Ndaw was released from house arrest. An international committee, which included representatives of ECOWAS and the African Union, had pushed for the authorities to release Ndaw and Ouane from house arrest, and welcomed the decision to do so in a statement.

== Awards and honors ==
He is an officer of the National Order of Mali. Ndaw is a recipient of the Medal of Military Merit as well as the Medal of National Merit.

== Notes ==
Political offices
| Preceded by Assimi Goïta as Chairman of the National Committee for the Salvation of the People of Mali | President of Mali; Interim; 2020–2021 | Succeeded by Assimi Goïta as Chairman of the National Committee for the Salvation of the People of Mali |
