= 2023 Malian constitutional referendum =

18 June 2023
- Proposed amendments to the Malian constitution

Results
Choice	Votes	%
Yes	3,110,877	96.91%
No	99,309	3.09%
Valid votes	3,210,186	99.22%
Invalid or blank votes	25,241	0.78%
Total votes	3,235,427	100.00%
Registered voters/turnout	8,463,084	38.23%

A constitutional referendum was held in Mali on 18 June 2023. It was initially scheduled for 9 July 2017. However, in late June 2017 it was postponed with no date set, before being revived in mid-April 2021, with a date set of 31 October 2021. Due to the 2021 Malian coup d'état it was indefinitely postponed, with plans for it to be held by 2024. It was later scheduled for 19 March 2023, but then postponed again. On 5 May 2023 the ruling junta announced in a decree that it would be held on 18 June.

The new constitution was approved by 97% of voters with a turnout of 38%, down slightly from the vote on the 1992 text. On 22 July the Constitutional Court certified the results and declared the new constitution to be in force.

== Constitutional changes ==
Proposed amendements to the constitution included the following:

- Two new regions would be created in line with a 2015 agreement with separatists in northern Mali. Eight regions would comprise the rest of the country.
- The powers of the president would be enhanced, effectively creating a presidential system. As such, the prime minister would now become accountable to the president, who directs government policy (with the prime minister implementing it), rather than the National Assembly.
- The president would serve as head of the Supreme Council of the Judiciary, have significant power in appointing civil and military administration, dissolve the legislature, submit bills to parliament, require parliament (through the government) to vote on a bill in a single vote only on those amendments proposed or accepted by the government, request the parliament, through the government, to authorize time-limited ordinances on matters usually reserved for parliamentary law-making, and appoint the president of the Constitutional Court (the overall composition of the court consists of two appointees by the president, one each by the President of the Senate and National Assembly, two by the Supreme Council of the Judiciary, two as lecturer-researchers in public law appointed by a college constituted by the rectors of public law universities, and one by the Bar Association. Each member is allotted one non-renewable term of seven years).
- Amnesty would be granted explicitly to those who participated in the 2020 Malian coup d'état and the following ruling junta during that time.
- A new upper house of parliament would be created, known as the Senate, with one-quarter of its members appointed by the president. Representation would be based on the regions, affording more representation to the sparsely populated but extensive north, with the remaining members being indirectly elected by local authorities. All members of parliament will additionally be forced to declare their wealth, in a bid to tackle corruption.
- The president may also call referendums on "any question of national interest or any bill relating to the organization of state institutions after receiving the advisory opinion of the Constitutional Court".
- The presidential term remains unchanged (directly elected for five years, with a maximum of two terms) and forms one of the entrenched clauses, along with the nature of the state as a secular republic, as well as the multi-party system. The president must also be between the ages of 35 and 75, be a Malian citizen by birth and hold only Malian citizenship.
- The president can be impeached by the legislature, but only for high treason, and only after a motion of dismissal is proposed by three-quarters of the members of a legislative chamber, approved by a commission of inquiry, then voted by an absolute majority fifteen days apart by each of the two chambers, making the process extremely difficult. Dismissal itself only occurs if the parliament assembled in congress votes by a qualified majority of three-quarters of its members.
- French, previously an official language, would be demoted to a working language, with all native languages designated as "national languages" receiving official status.
- Traditional and religious courts are legalised. Elected regional councils would also be set up in the ten regions of Mali, including the two newly created in the north. A Court of Auditors would also be created.
- Marriage would be defined as "a union between a man and a woman", effectively banning same-sex marriage.
- Any future constitutional revision must be voted in favour of by two-thirds of each of the two houses of the legislature, followed by approval in a referendum.

== Campaign ==
The referendum was supported by the Union for the Republic and Democracy and the Democratic Alliance for Peace, while part of the opposition (including the Convergence for the Development of Mali) opposed it, noting that under the prior constitution a vote in the legislature would be needed to approve it first. Additionally, the composition of the electoral authority was called into question, with junta leader Assimi Goïta having appointed ten of its fifteen members instead of the three provided for by law. Retaining the mention of the country being a secular state was opposed by the Malian League of Imams and Scholars for Islamic Solidarity in Mali.

== Results ==
Choice	Votes	%
For	3,110,877	96.91
Against	99,309	3.09
Total	3,210,186	100.00
Valid votes	3,210,186	99.22
Invalid/blank votes	25,241	0.78
Total votes	3,235,427	100.00
Registered voters/turnout	8,463,084	38.23
Source: AA
