= M5-RFP =

The Movement of June 5 – Rally of Patriotic Forces (French: Mouvement du 5 Juin – Rassemblement des forces patriotiques; M5-RFP) is a political movement in Mali founded in June 2020 in opposition to the government of Ibrahim Boubacar Keïta.

The imam Mahmoud Dicko, an influential opposition figure who led the M5-RFP, told protestors in August 2020: "This combat is to restore the Malian nation ... If [Keïta] doesn't listen to us, he will see. I swear before God that he will see. But if we don't rush, we will win this victory." The government of Keïta was deposed by a military junta in a coup d'état later that month, after it was embattled by months of protest led by the M5-RFP movement. According to Le Monde and Agence France-Presse, at that point, the movement had become a coalition composed of members of the opposition and religious and civil society.

The following month, in September 2020, M5-RFP rejected a charter produced after discussions between political and civil figures, including M5-RFP representatives, and the military junta for an 18-month transition of power. Among the points of contention, the coalition cited the lack of "recognition of the role of the M5-RFP and the martyrs in the struggle of the Malian people for change" (Note: French: "reconnaissance du rôle du M5-RFP et des martyrs dans la lutte du Peuple malien pour le changement") and said that there was a "majority choice of a transition led by a civilian figure". (Note: French: "choix majoritaire d'une transition dirigée par une personnalité civile") Former defense minister and retired colonel Bah Ndaw was named the interim president later that month by a committee backed by the military junta. Some M5-RFP coalition leaders supported Ndaw's appointment; coalition coordinator Choguel Kokalla Maïga was dissatisfied with the appointment, while Dicko was not involved in the committee's decision to make the appointment.

Ndaw and prime minister Moctar Ouane were arrested by the military in May 2021 and resigned shortly from their positions shortly after. A new transitional president, Assimi Goïta, was sworn in shortly thereafter. Goïta called for the M5-RFP to name a new prime minister from within M5-RFP; Choguel Kokalla Maïga was subsequently named by the coalition. At a rally the following month, the M5-RFP called on the international community to support Mali following the coup the previous year.

In November 2024, the military junta ousted Maiga as prime minister after he had reportedly "issued a rare criticism of the military rulers."
