= Coup Belt =

Geopolitical neologism for an African region

- Geopolitical concept
- African countries in the Coup Belt
- Continent: Africa
- Subregion: Sahel, West Africa, and Central Africa
- Countries: Burkina Faso; Chad; Gabon; Guinea; Guinea-Bissau; Mali; Niger; Sudan

The Coup Belt (French: Ceinture de Coups d'État; Portuguese: Cinturão Golpista; Arabic: حزام الانقلابات) is a modern geopolitical concept and neologism which emerged during the 2020s to describe the region of West Africa, Central Africa and the Sahel that is home to countries with a high prevalence of coups d'état. Following the 2023 Nigerien coup, these countries form a continuous chain stretching between the east and west coasts of Africa.

The coups have largely been similar in nature; most came from dissatisfied militaries who criticised their respective government's handling of Islamic insurgents or protests since 2003. Resentment over French military, financial and political influence over African governments has also played a role. The incoming juntas tend to have worse relations with the West, with many seeking support from Russia and the Wagner Group, Turkey, or Qatar and the Arab League instead of France, which previously helped the countries fight against Islamic insurgents through Operation Barkhane. This has led Ukraine, which is at war with Russia, to fund opposition groups, which in turn has caused a proxy war between Russia and Ukraine in Africa.

== Origin ==
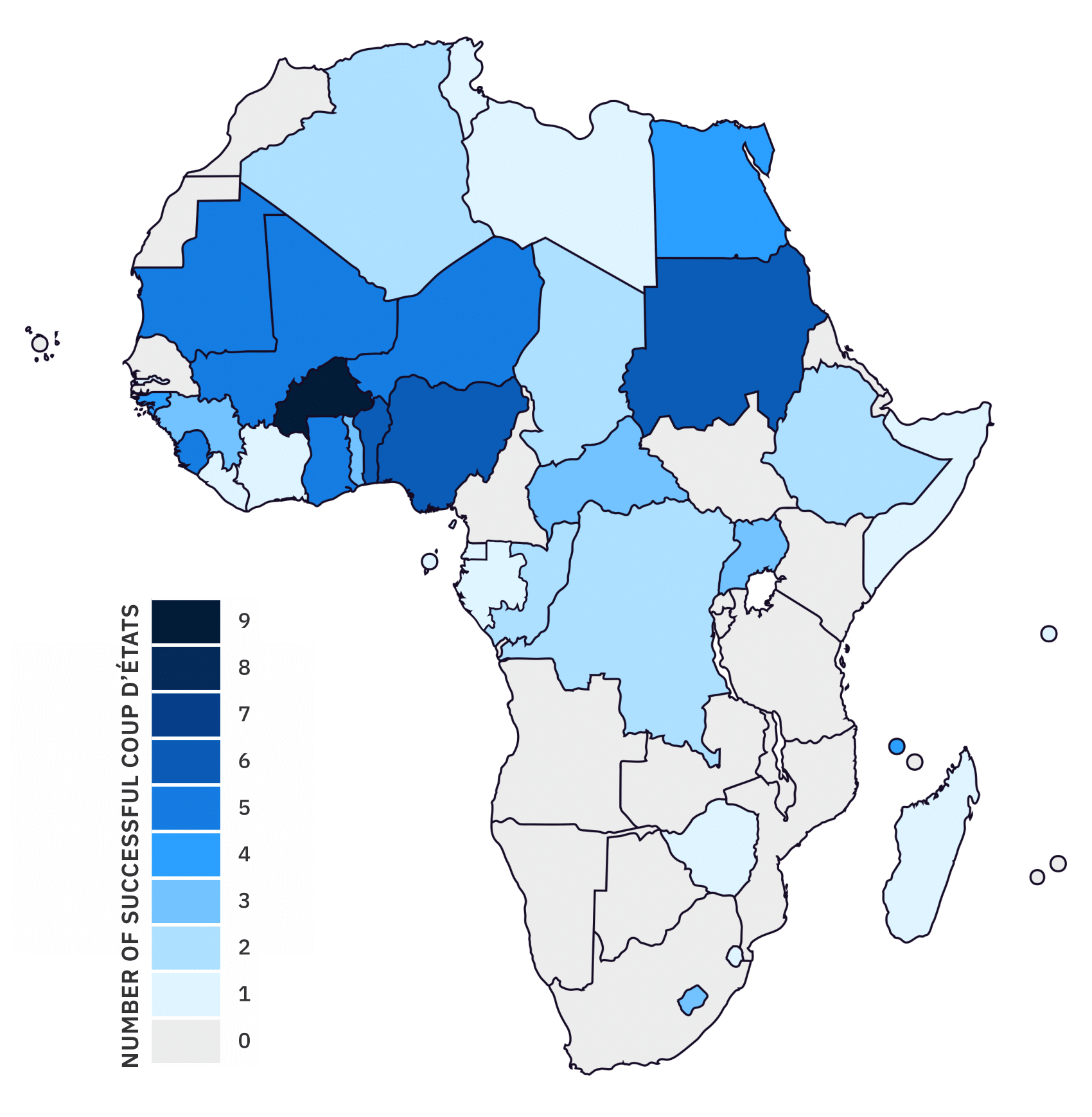
The number of successful coups d'état in postcolonial Africa (as of 28 September 2023)

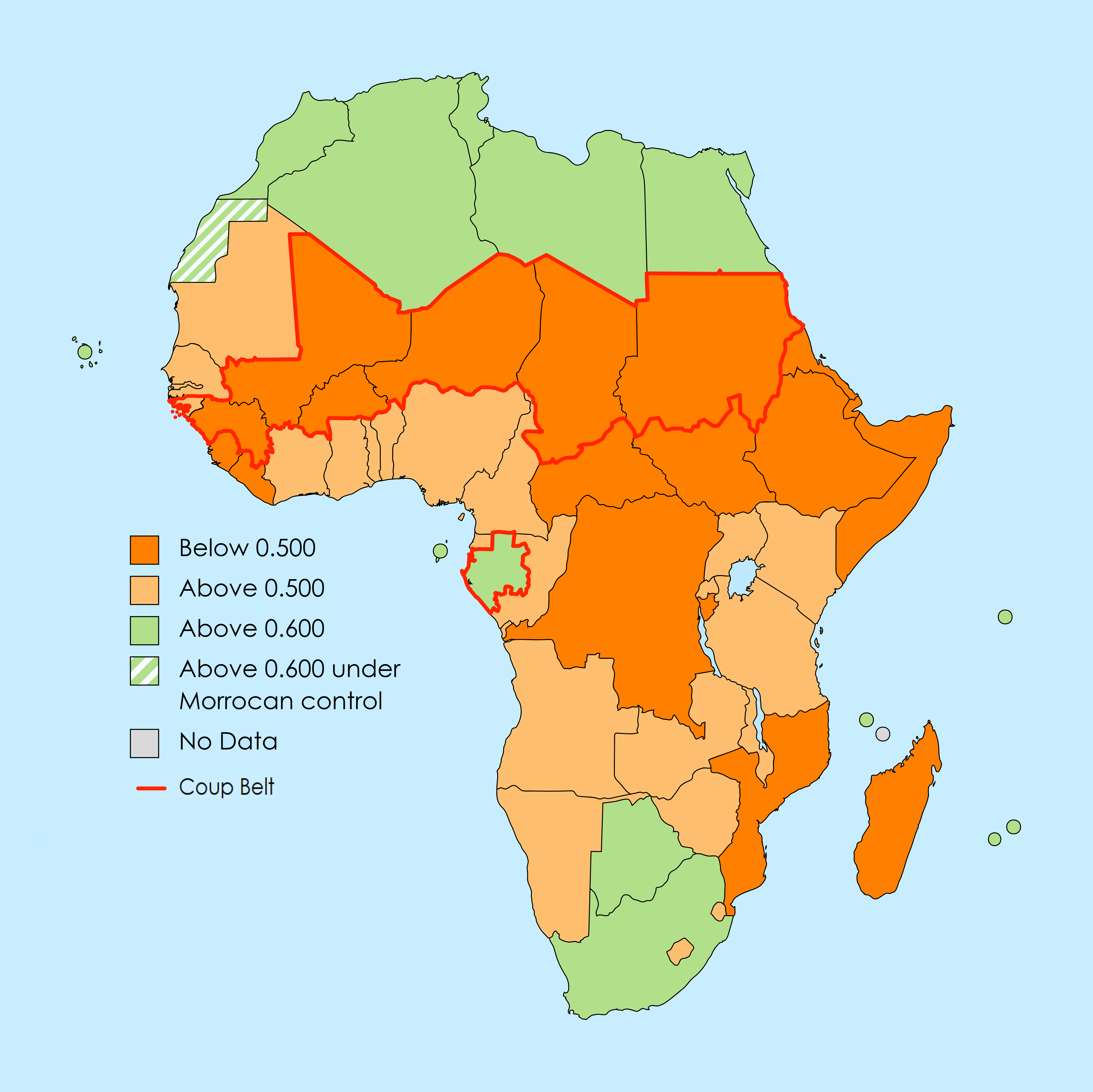
Human Development Index (HDI) of African countries, with the Coup Belt outlined in red (Gabon is sometimes included following the 2023 coup). Except Gabon, every country in the Coup Belt has an HDI below 0.600, indicating low human development.

Although likely older, the term became popular in the 2020s after a string of coups in the early part of the decade, including in Mali in 2020 and 2021, Chad, Guinea and Sudan in 2021, two in Burkina Faso in 2022 (in January and September), in Niger and Gabon in 2023, and Guinea-Bissau in 2025. The region also saw attempted coups in Niger and Sudan in 2021, Guinea–Bissau and The Gambia in 2022, Sudan, Sierra Leone and Burkina Faso in 2023, Benin in 2025, and Niger in 2026. However, some of these are not seen as part of the coup belt, and while the 2025 Malagasy coup d'état succeeded, it is not considered part of the coup belt. The Republic of The Gambia, is sometimes included as a coup belt country, due the coup d'état attempt in 2022, which however failed.

== History ==
Since 1990, 21 of the 27 coups in Sub-Saharan Africa have taken place in former French colonies. This has led some to question whether French influence in Africa has a destabilising impact. The military juntas of Burkina Faso, Mali, and Niger have vocally expressed this sentiment, often accusing France of neo-colonial ambitions—each cancelling military agreements that allowed French troops to operate on their territory, ordering their withdrawal, and removing French as an official language.

The Economic Community of West African States (ECOWAS)—which currently and formerly comprised states within the belt—has tried to actively work on changing the label associated with the region, but has been unsuccessful. The regional bloc suspended Mali after its coup in 2021, and also suspended Guinea on 8 September 2021, shortly after a military coup took place in the country. The three members of the Alliance of Sahel States were suspended before ultimately withdrawing from ECOWAS in 2023.

Considering only the subregion of West Africa, the 2020 coup d'état in Mali occurred after a period of nearly six years since the 2014 Burkina Faso uprising and the ousting of Burkina Faso’s President Blaise Compaoré, during which there was not a single undemocratic change of government in West Africa. For this subregion where many countries have a history of civil war and violent conflict, this was a period of remarkable stability during which ECOWAS even managed to find a peaceful resolution to the 2016–2017 Gambian constitutional crisis.

The 2023 Gabonese coup d'état was somewhat different, as Gabon was ruled for 56 years by the Bongo family before the coup, is not near or part of the Sahel, and did not suffer from Islamist or separatist insurgencies. The Gabonese coup occurred in the context of widespread protests over the conduct of the 2023 Gabonese general election. It led to the establishment of a presidential republic under a military junta.

== List of Coup Belt countries ==
The following list includes countries described as part of the Coup Belt, along with their respective successful coups in the 2020s, in order of the first successful coup:

Country	Event	Sources
Mali	August 2020 Malian coup d'état	
Mali	May 2021 Malian coup d'état	
Chad	April 2021 protests in Chad	
Guinea	September 2021 Guinean coup d'état	
Sudan	October 2021 Sudanese coup d'état	
Burkina Faso	January 2022 Burkina Faso coup d'état	
Burkina Faso	September 2022 Burkina Faso coup d'état	
Niger	July 2023 Nigerien coup d'état	
Gabon	August 2023 Gabonese coup d'état	
Guinea-Bissau	November 2025 Guinea-Bissau coup d'état	
