= Grand Mosque of Bamako =

Mosque in Bamako, Mali

- Grande Mosquée de Bamako
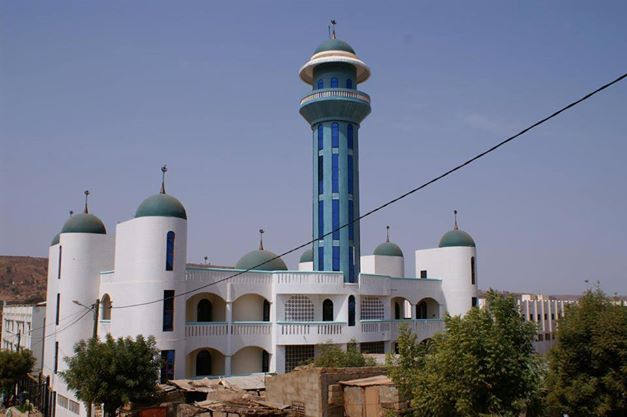

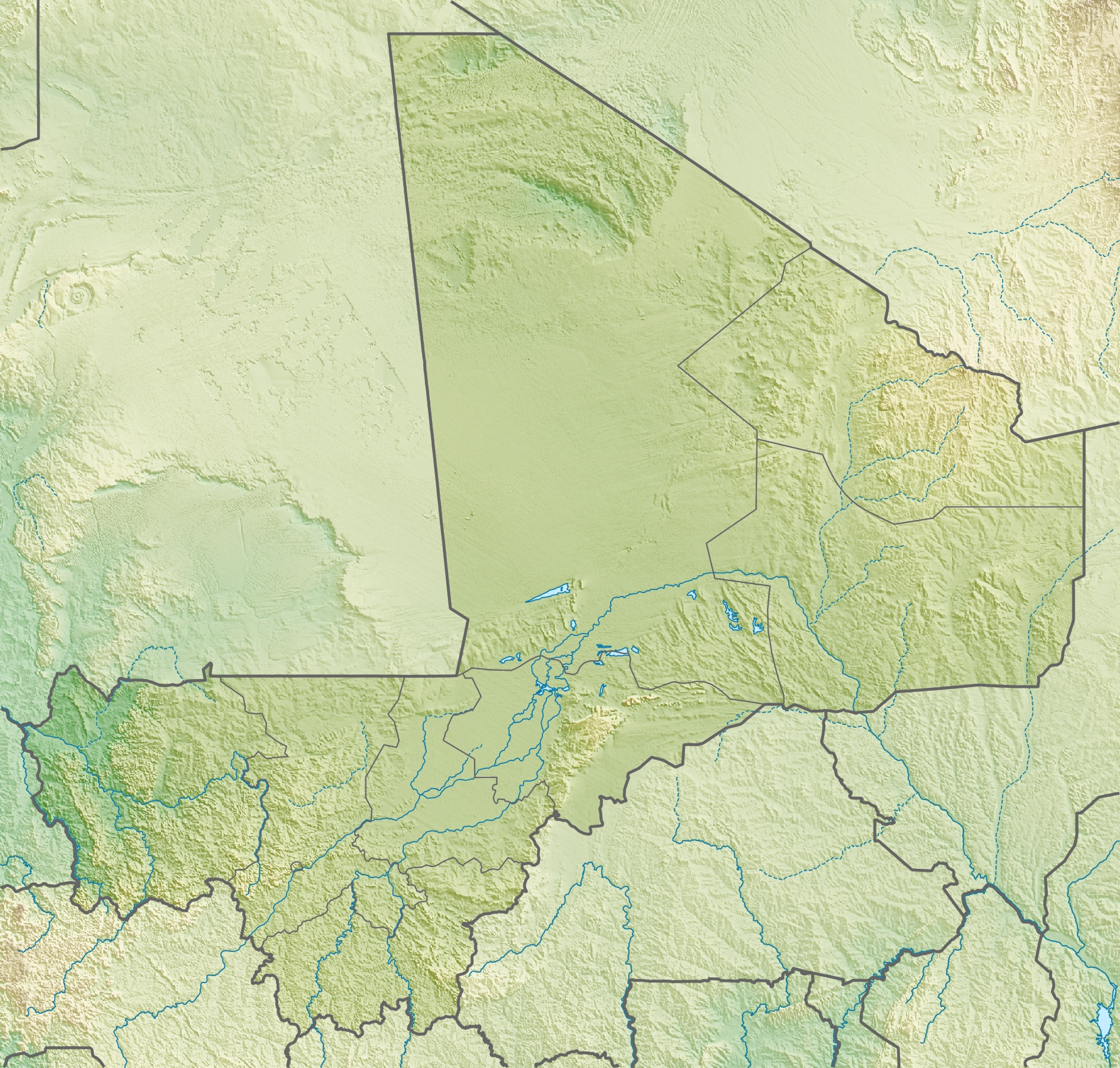
- Location within Mali

Religion
- Affiliation: Islam
- Branch/tradition: Sunni Islam

Location
- Location: Bamako, Mali
- Interactive map of Grand Mosque of Bamako
- Coordinates: 12°38′49″N 7°59′35″W

Architecture
- Type: mosque
- Completed: 1970s

Bamako Grand Mosque (French: Grande Mosquée de Bamako) is a mosque in the city centre of Bamako, Mali. Built on the site of a pre-colonial mud-brick mosque, the current mosque was built through funding from the Saudi Arabian government at the end of the 1970s. One of the tallest structures in Bamako, it is situated north of the Niger River near the central market (Grand Marche) and the colonial-era Bamako Cathedral. With its tall cement minarets built around a square central structure, the building is stylistically closer to Saudi religious structures than West African. The mosque is visible from much of the city and is occasionally opened to tourists.

== See also ==
- Islam in Mali
