= Souleymane Doucouré =

Malian politician

Souleymane Doucouré is a Malian politician who served as the Defense Minister of Mali. He was captured and arrested during the 2021 Malian coup d'état.
