= Malian Air Force =

- Armée de l'air du Mali
- Malian Armed Forces emblem
- Founded: 1961; 65 years ago
- Country: Mali
- Type: Air force
- Role: Aerial warfare
- Part of: Malian Armed Forces
- Engagements: Agacher Strip War; Mali War

Commanders
- Chief of Air Staff: General Alou Boi Diarra
- Deputy Chief of Air Staff: Lieutenant Colonel Adama Bagayoko

Insignia
- Roundel

- Alternate roundel

Aircraft flown
- Attack: Aero L-39, Bayraktar TB2
- Fighter: MiG-21
- Helicopter: H215
- Attack helicopter: Mi-24/Mi-35
- Reconnaissance: Cessna 208
- Trainer: EMB-314, SF.260
- Transport: An-26, An-28, BT-67, C-295, Y-12

The Malian Air Force (French: Armée de l'air du Mali) is the primary aerial warfare branch of Malian Armed Forces. It was established in 1961. In the following years, the Malian Air Force received significant support from the Soviet Union, which provided both equipment and training to the force. Since 2022, it has received support from Russia.

== History ==
The Malian Air Force (French: Armée de l'air du Mali) was founded in 1961 with French-supplied military aid. This included MH.1521 Broussard utility monoplane followed by two C-47 transports. In 1962, the Soviet Union would then supply the Malian Air Force with four Antonov AN-2 Colt biplane transports and four Mi-4 light helicopters.

In the mid-1960s, the Soviets would further deliver five MiG-17F fighters and a single MiG-15UTI fighter trainer to equip a squadron based at Bamako–Sénou initially with Soviet pilots. Two Ilyushin Il-14 transports and a Mil Mi-8 helicopter were delivered in 1971 followed by two Antonov An-24 transports.

In 1974, 12 MiG-21Bis were obtained from the Soviet Union, with a pair of two-seat MiG-21UMs to follow a couple of years later. These initial Fishbeds served alongside the four remaining MiG-17Fs and saw combat on two occasions during the Agacher Strip War in 1974 against Upper Volta, and again in 1985 with the same country, now renamed Burkina Faso. In 2005, another three MiG-21MFs were delivered from the Czech Republic, reinforcing the surviving jets. By 2010, the Fishbeds were only flown on ceremonial occasions. By January 2012, only one MiG-21MF and one MiG-21UM remained operational until they were grounded for lack of spare parts, ammunition, and pilots a few months later. In January 2013, the Nigerian Air Force sent a technical team to Bamako–Sénou International, with the aim of refurbishing the MiG-21s, but the project was abandoned. Other jets withdrawn from service were six L-29 Delfins, which were used for training.

In June 2015 the Malian government ordered Super Tucano light attack aircraft from the Brazilian company Embraer. Four were paid for and were delivered in 2018. One of these crashed in Sévaré two years later, killing both pilots.

In December 2020, the Malian government ordered 4 Mi-171 helicopters. They were delivered by Russia on 30 September 2021. Russia has assisted Mali with reviving the Malian Air Force, which as of 2023 has received at least four Aero L-39 jet trainers, one Mi-8T Hip transport helicopter and two Mi-8MTs, two Mi-24 attack helicopters, two Sukhoi Su-25 ground attack jets, and a single Airbus C-295.

Both of the Su-25s were lost. In September 2023, the Malian government has lost their last Su-25 due to a crash caused by a missile launched by Azawad rebels. However the pilot safely ejected. Additional losses during the Mali War include three L-39s, multiple Mi-24s and Mi-8s, and a Su-24. Some of the helicopters were operated by Russia's Wagner Group or Africa Corps.

In November 2026, the Malian Air Force took delivery of aircraft from Russia, consisting of Mi-8M and Mi-24 helicopters, as well as an Il-76 strategic airlifter.

== Equipment ==
=== Current aircraft ===
Aircraft	Origin	In service	Type	Variant	Notes
Combat aircraft
Aero L-39 Albatros	Czech Republic	12	Attack / Jet trainer	L-39C	2 lost in 2023, 1 shot down in 2024.
Mikoyan-Gurevich MiG-21	Soviet Union	9	Fighter		Out of operation for many years, as of 2026.
Reconnaissance aircraft
Cessna 208	United States	1	Reconnaissance		
Transport
Antonov An-26	Soviet Union	1	Transport		
Antonov An-28	Soviet Union	1	Transport		
Basler BT-67	United States	1	Utility		
CASA C-295	Spain	2	Transport		
Harbin Y-12	China	2	Utility		
Ilyushin Il-76	Russia	1	Strategic airlifter	Il-76TD	Delivered in 2026.
Helicopters
Airbus Helicopters H215	France	2	Utility	H215M/AS332	
Mil Mi-24	Russia	7	Attack	Mi-35M	1 lost in 2023, 1 in 2024, and 2 in 2026. An additional aircraft was shot down by JNIM fighters on 19 July 2026.
Mil Mi-17	Russia	4	Utility	Mi-171Sh	4 were delivered in 2021
Trainer aircraft
Embraer EMB 314 Super Tucano	Brazil	3	Trainer		
SIAI-Marchetti SF.260	Italy	1	Trainer		
Unmanned aerial vehicle
Bayraktar TB2	Turkey	20+	UCAV		TB2 drone station lost in April 2026.
Bayraktar Akıncı	Turkey	4 (2)	UCAV	AKINCI-A	1 crash on 10 January 2025 and 1 destroyed on 31 March 2025. 2 more delivered in 2026.

=== Retired aircraft ===
Retired aircraft include Aero L-29 Delfín, Antonov AN-2 Colt, Antonov An-24, Douglas C-47 Skytrain, Ilyushin Il-14, MH.1521 Broussard, MiG-15, MiG-17F, Mil Mi-4 Mil Mi-8, Su-25.

== Ranks ==
=== Commissioned officer ranks ===
The rank insignia of commissioned officers.

Rank group	General / flag officers				Senior officers				Junior officers
Malian Air Force
Malian Air Force	Général d'armée	Général de corps d'armée	Général de division	Général de brigade	Colonel-major	Colonel	Lieutenant-colonel	Commandant	Capitaine	Lieutenant	Sous-lieutenant

=== Other ranks ===
The rank insignia of non-commissioned officers and enlisted personnel.

Rank group	Senior NCOs					Junior NCOs		Enlisted
Malian Air Force
Malian Air Force	Major	Adjudant-chef	Adjudant	Sergent-chef	Sergent	Caporal-chef	Caporal	Soldat de première classe	Soldat
