= Assimi Goita =

Leader of Mali since 2021

- Goita in 2026

6th President of Mali
- Incumbent
- Assumed office 24 May 2021 (Note: De facto: 24–28 May 2021 Interim: 28 May 2021 – 8 July 2025)
- Prime Minister: Choguel Kokalla Maïga; Abdoulaye Maïga (interim)
- Preceded by: Bah Ndaw (interim)

Minister of Defense and Veterans Affairs
- Incumbent
- Assumed office 4 May 2026
- President: Himself
- Prime Minister: Abdoulaye Maïga (interim)
- Preceded by: Sadio Camara

President of the Confederation of Sahel States
- In office 6 July 2024 – 24 December 2025
- Preceded by: Position established
- Succeeded by: Ibrahim Traoré

Chairman of the National Committee for the Salvation of the People
- In office 18 August 2020 – 25 September 2020
- Vice Chairman: Malick Diaw
- Preceded by: Position established (Note: Ibrahim Boubacar Keïta (as president))
- Succeeded by: Position abolished (Note: Bah Ndaw (as interim president))

Interim Vice President of Mali
- In office 25 September 2020 – 24 May 2021
- President: Bah Ndaw (interim)
- Preceded by: Malick Diaw (Note: as Vice Chairman of the National Committee for the Salvation of the People)
- Succeeded by: Office abolished

Personal details
- Born: 9 November 1983 (age 43) Bamako, Mali
- Party: Independent
- Spouse: Lala Diallo
- Education: Joint Military School; Prytanée militaire de Kati

Military service
- Allegiance: Mali
- Branch/service: Malian Army
- Years of service: 2002–present
- Rank: Général d'Armée
- Unit: Autonomous Special Forces Battalion
- Battles/wars: Mali War; War in the Sahel

Assimi Goita (born 9 November 1983) is a Malian politician and military officer who has ruled Mali since 2021. He has served as the sixth president of Mali since 2025, previously serving as the interim vice president under Interim President Bah Ndaw from 2020 to 2021 and then as the interim president until 2025. He also served as the president of the Alliance of Sahel States (AES) from 2024 to 2025.

Born in Bamako, Goita graduated from the Joint Military School in 2002 and was later assigned to the 134th Reconnaissance Squadron in Gao. Goita also attended advanced military training and courses in Germany, Gabon, France and the United States. Following a coup in August 2020, Goïta became Mali's de facto leader as chairman of the National Committee for the Salvation of the People, a military junta that seized power from former president Ibrahim Boubacar Keïta. The following month, Goita was appointed the interim vice president under the new interim president Bah Ndaw, to whom Goïta had transferred power in response to international pressure.

In May 2021, following a dispute in the government, Goita seized power from Ndaw in another coup and was subsequently appointed interim president. His rule has seen increased authoritarianism domestically, as well as strained relations with ECOWAS, the United Nations, and France. Goita's government cut military ties with France and became allied with Russia and the Wagner Group. In January 2024, Goïta announced Mali's withdrawal from ECOWAS and later formed the AES with Ibrahim Traoré and Abdourahamane Tiani, the military leaders of Burkina Faso and Niger respectively.

== Early life and military career ==
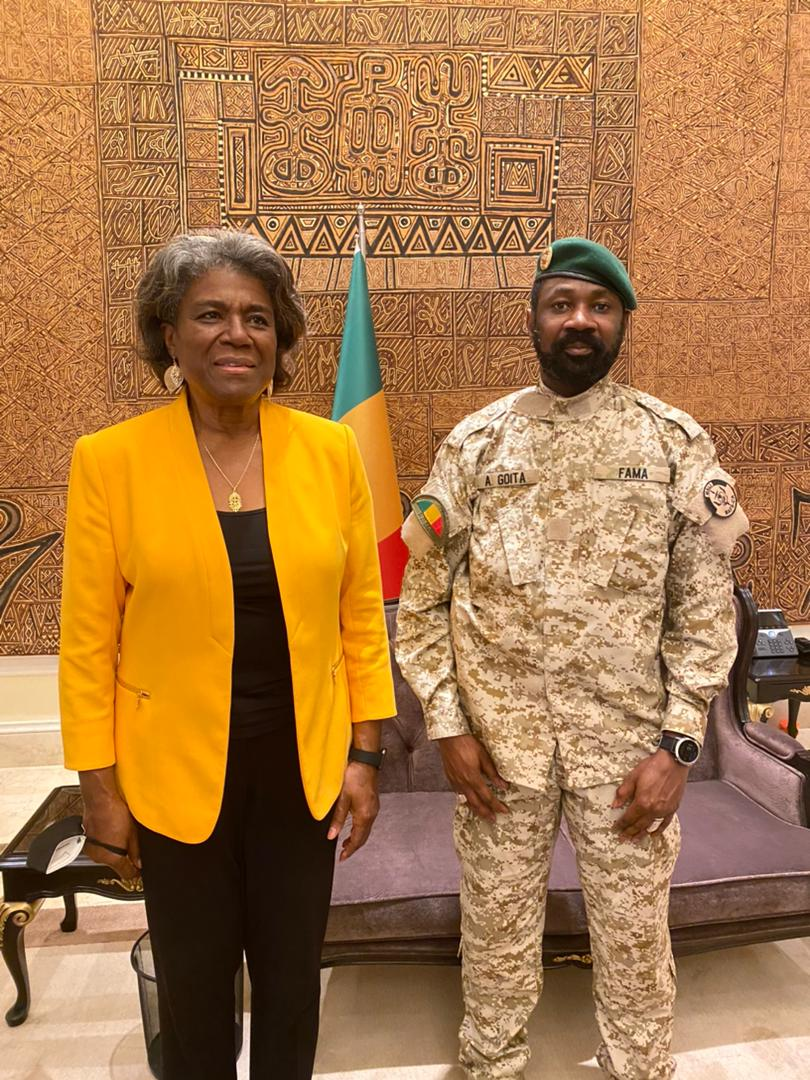
Goïta with American diplomat Linda Thomas-Greenfield in 2021

Goita was born in 1983. A member of the Minianka tribe and the son of a military officer, he was trained in the military academies of Mali and notably attended the Prytanée militaire de Kati and the Joint Military School in Koulikoro.

Goïta served as a colonel in the Autonomous Special Forces Battalion, the special forces unit of the Malian Armed Forces. He commanded the Malian special forces in the center of the country with the rank of colonel, and took part in the jihadist insurgency in Mali. In 2018, he met the future Guinean coup leader and president Mamady Doumbouya.

Goïta received further military training from the United States, France, and Germany, and had experience working with United States Army Special Forces.

== Coup leader and President of Mali ==
=== First coup d'état and vice presidency (2020) ===
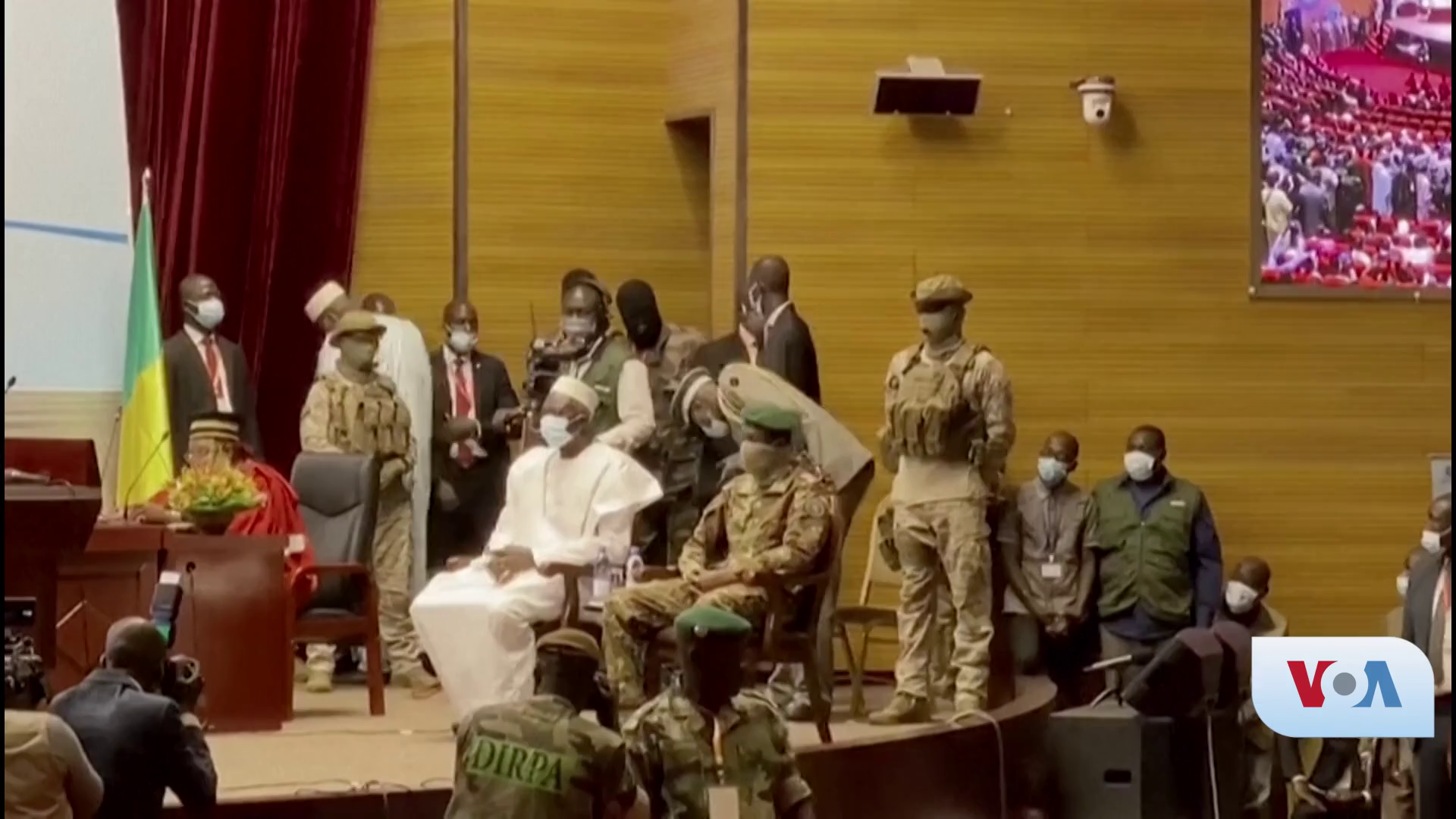
Inauguration of Goïta as vice president

Goïta served as the leader of the National Committee for the Salvation of the People, a group of rebels who overthrew Ibrahim Boubacar Keïta in the 2020 Malian coup d'état, and have pledged to initiate new elections to replace him. Because of this pledge, the Economic Community of West African States (ECOWAS) pressured Mali's ruling junta to ensure that the country would be led by a civilian.

On 21 September, Goïta was named interim vice president by a group of 17 electors, with Bah Ndaw being appointed interim president. They were to hold the position for 18 months, until new elections. He took the oath of office on 25 September 2020. On 1 October 2020, the "Mali Transition Letter" was published where it was specified, in response to the request of ECOWAS, that the vice president "in charge of defense and security issues" would not be able to replace President Bah Ndaw.

=== Second coup d'état and current rule (2021–present) ===
Goïta was involved in a second coup d'état on 24 May 2021, after which he seized power. President Ndaw and Prime Minister Moctar Ouane were detained. Goïta claimed that Ndaw was attempting to "sabotage" the transition to democracy, and committed to elections in 2022. The coup was instigated by Goita's claim that Ndaw failed to consult him about a cabinet reshuffle. It was alleged that one of the motives for the latest coup was the removal of Colonel Sadio Camara as defense minister. Camara was reinstated as defense minister by Goïta following his takeover.

On 28 May 2021, the constitutional court declared him interim president of Mali. The court ruling stated that Goïta should carry the title "president of the transition, head of state" to "lead the transition process to its conclusion". On the same day, he said that he would name a prime minister from the M5-RFP coalition. Choguel Kokalla Maïga was eventually nominated to form a cabinet. On 20 July 2021, Goïta was attacked by a knife-wielding man while praying at the Grand Mosque in Bamako amid festivities for the Eid al-Adha. The attacker was then immediately arrested after failing to stab the President. Overall two men were arrested by the security forces. One of them was, however, found to be a special forces soldier wrongly assumed to be the attacker's accomplice. The knifeman, identified as a teacher, died in custody five days after the attack. The cause of death is unknown.

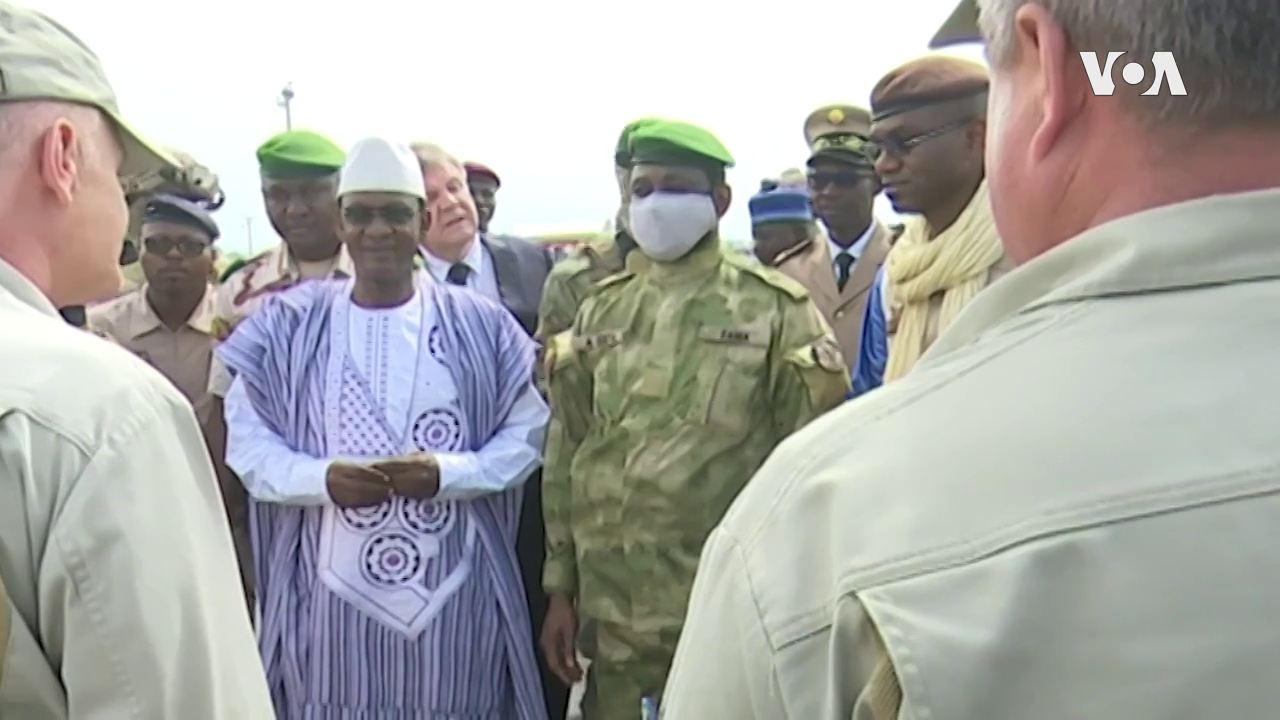
Goïta with prime minister Choguel Kokalla Maïga in August 2022

On 23 June 2023, a constitutional referendum took place, with 97% of voters supporting the adoption of the proposed constitution. 39.4% of registered voters participated in the referendum. The new constitution was controversial, with critics alleging that the referendum was compromised and that the new constitution would make democratic reforms less likely. On 25 July 2023, it was announced that Goïta had pardoned 46 soldiers from Ivory Coast that had been sentenced in December 2022. In July 2023, Goïta attended the 2023 Russia–Africa Summit in Saint Petersburg in his first foreign visit since the 2021 coup. After the summit ended, he met with Russian President Vladimir Putin to discuss Russia's ongoing economic and humanitarian support for Mali. During the meeting, Goïta accused countries sanctioning Mali of engaging in a "neocolonialist practice", according to a transcript by the Kremlin.

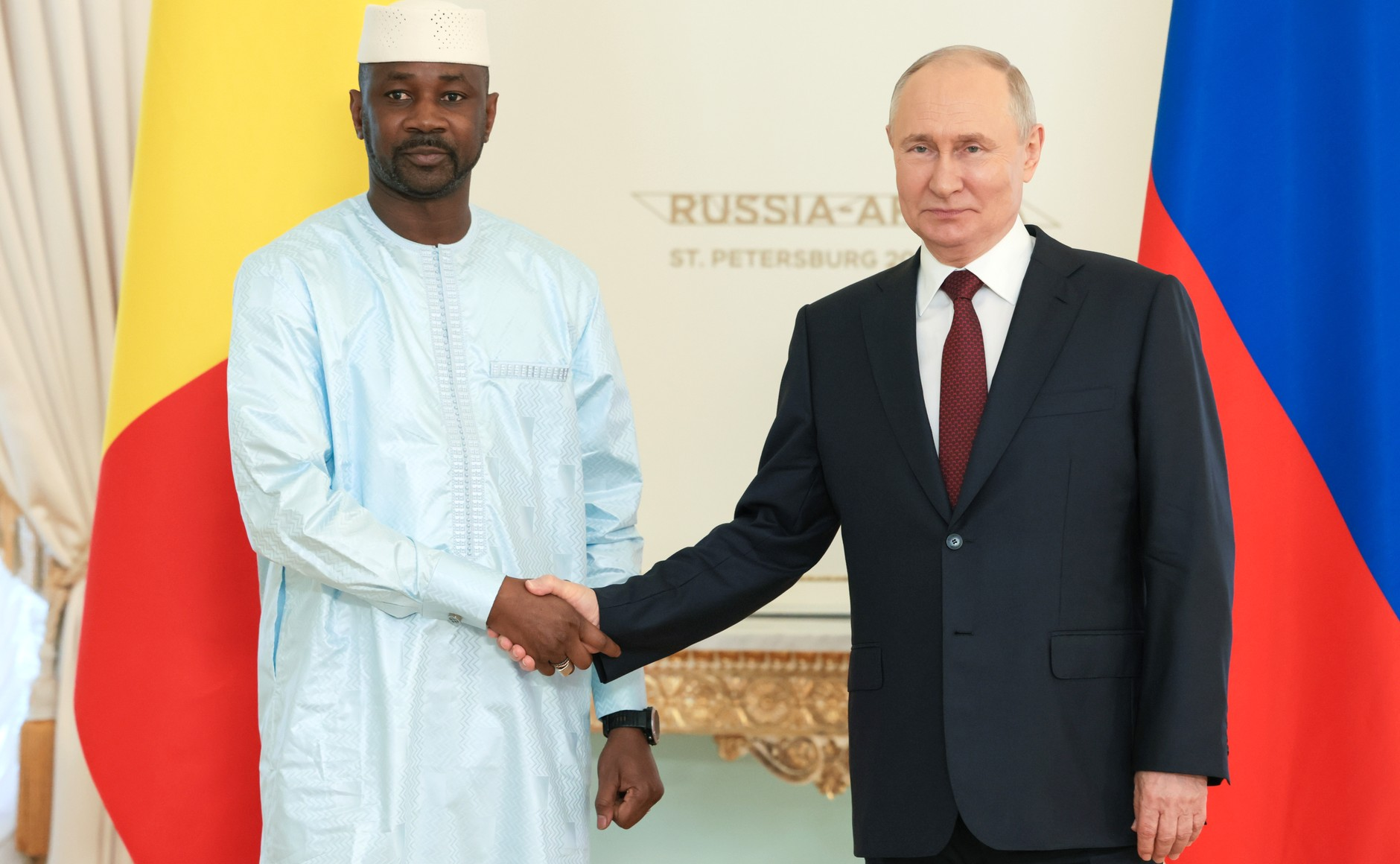
Goïta with Russian president Vladimir Putin in July 2023

Goïta declared his support for the National Council for the Safeguard of the Homeland (CNSP) junta in Niger in the wake of the 2023 Nigerien coup d'état, and the CNSP later gave the Malian Armed Forces permission to enter Niger. In October 2023, Goïta held a telephone conversation with Putin, his third in less than two months, in which they discussed trade and security relations. Goïta later publicly "expressed [his] gratitude for all the support that Russia provides to Mali."

In October 2024, Goïta self-promoted to the rank of general of the Malian Army. He indefinitely postponed elections in 2024 and dissolved all political parties in May 2025. On 3 July 2025, the National Transitional Council allowed Goïta to stay in office for a five-year term, renewable "as many times as necessary" and without requiring an election.

On 25 April 2026, the Azawad Liberation Front and Jama'at Nusrat al-Islam wal-Muslimin jointly launched attacks across Mali. According to the junta, the insurgents attempted to kill Goïta at his residence with a car bomb. He disappeared from public view, and resurfaced on April 29, meeting with the Russian ambassador. On May 4, Goïta appointed himself defense minister to replace Sadio Camara, who was killed in the attacks. Military chief Oumar Diarra was appointed minister delegate.

=== 2025 alleged coup attempt ===
On August 14, Mali's senior military leadership announced it had thwarted an alleged coup attempt, arresting two generals (Abass Dembélé, former governor of Mopti Region, and Air Force Brigadier General Nema Sagara), several dozen military officers, soldiers, and civilians, as well as a French national and former lieutenant colonel in the National Gendarmerie who was accused of working on behalf of French intelligence services. The Chief of Staff of the National Guard was purportedly arrested as well. Rumors surrounding the arrests had supposedly been circulating throughout Mali in the days leading up to the announcement; no evidence was provided to legitimate claims made by the government.

The alleged coup is believed by outside observers to be tied to an internal power struggle within the military junta. Experts believe that a schism between Goïta and Defense Minister Sadio Camara over future elections influenced the arrests. Reportedly, the majority of those arrested were members of the National Guard, within which Camara had a strong base of support. Opposition to Goïta has been growing since 2024, with multiple key figures in the junta shifting/consolidating their support to/behind Camara. Several officials aligned with the Defense Minister were removed from their posts that year; Camara was largely cut off from the leadership's communications channels thereafter, prior to his assassination in 2026.

=== Economic policies ===
Under Goïta the government's stake in mining projects increases from 20% to 35%, with an option to acquire an additional 10%. Companies must pay new taxes and settle tax arrears, or face severe penalties. He advocates nationalization, which is shown in two mines, the Morila and Yatela mines, now entirely under state control. Additionally, an audit commissioned by Goïta allegedly revealed "irregularities" in mining contracts.

== Public image ==
Assimi Goïta portrays himself as the "Defender and Liberator of Mali" and as a "Exceptional man in exceptional times", this mirrors with Malian myths and traditions. The national liberation rhetoric of Goïta is described as conservative populist rather than as traditional left-wing revolutionary one.

== Personal life ==
Goïta is married to Lala Diallo. He is Muslim.

== Notes ==
Political offices
Preceded by Ibrahim Boubacar Keïta as President of Mali	Chairman of the National Committee for the Salvation of the People of Mali; 2020	Succeeded by Bah Ndaw as Interim President of Mali
