= 2021 Malian coup d'état =

Military overthrow of President Bah N'daw

- Part of the Mali War and the Coup Belt
Date	24 May 2021
Location	Mali
Result	Coup d'état successful: Resignation of interim president Bah Ndaw and prime minister Moctar Ouane; Vice President Assimi Goïta named interim President by Constitutional Court of Mali; Mali suspended from ECOWAS, La Francophonie and the African Union; Choguel Kokalla Maïga named interim prime minister; France suspends joint military operations and national advisory missions with the Malian military from 3 June to 3 July 2021

Belligerents
Government of Mali	Malian Armed Forces

Commanders and leaders
Bah Ndaw; Moctar Ouane; Souleymane Doucouré	Assimi Goïta

On the night of 24 May 2021, the Malian Army led by Vice President Assimi Goïta captured President Bah N'daw, Prime Minister Moctar Ouane and Minister of Defence Souleymane Doucouré. Assimi Goïta, the head of the junta that led the 2020 Malian coup d'état, announced that N'daw and Ouane were stripped of their powers and that new elections would be held in 2022. It is the country's third coup d'état in ten years, following the 2012 and 2020 military takeovers, with the latter having happened only nine months earlier.

== Background ==
Nine months prior to the 2021 coup, in August 2020, President Ibrahim Boubacar Keïta was removed from power by a group of military officers. This followed months of unrest in Mali following irregularities in the March and April parliamentary elections and outrage against the kidnapping of opposition leader Soumaila Cissé. On 18 August 2020, members of the military led by Colonel Assimi Goïta and Colonel-Major Ismaël Wagué in Kati, Koulikoro Region began a mutiny. President Keïta, and Prime Minister Boubou Cissé were arrested, and shortly after midnight Keïta announced his resignation, saying he did not want to see any bloodshed.

Following Keïta's resignation, on behalf of the military officers, Wagué announced the formation of the National Committee for the Salvation of the People (CNSP), and promised to hold elections in the near future. On 12 September 2020, CNSP agreed to an 18-month political transition to civilian rule. Shortly after, Bah N'daw was named interim president by a group of 17 electors, with Goïta being appointed vice president. The government was inaugurated on 25 September 2020.

On 18 January 2021, the transitional government announced that the CNSP had been disbanded, almost four months after it had been promised under the initial agreement.

== Coup ==
Tensions were high between the civilian transitional government and the military since the handover of power in September. This led to rebel soldiers arresting Keïta and Cissé at gunpoint. The opposition M5 movement, which had spearheaded the 2020 Malian protests against Keïta, publicly called for the interim government to be dissolved and replaced with a "more legitimate" one. On 14 May, the government announced plans for a new, "broad-based" cabinet.

On 24 May, tensions came to a head after a cabinet reshuffle. In the reshuffle, the military's power over key ministries was not changed, however two leaders of the coup – Sadio Camara and Modibo Kone – were replaced by N'daw's administration.

Later that day, increased military activity was reported by several sources, including the US Embassy in Bamako, though the city remained relatively calm. Several journalists reported that three key civilian leaders – N'daw, Ouane and Doucore, were being detained in a military base in Kati, outside Bamako.

In a public television statement, Goïta announced that N'daw and Ouane were stripped of their powers because they tried to "sabotage" the transition, which Goïta said would "proceed as normally". Goïta, a vice president in the interim administration, said that he should have been consulted on the cabinet shuffle, which he described as a breach of the transitional charter drawn up by the military junta after the coup. Goïta also promised that new elections would be held in 2022.

On 6 June 2022, it was announced that the transition to democracy would be delayed for another two years. The interim President, Colonel Assimi Goïta, signed a decree prolonging the military rule.

== Aftermath ==
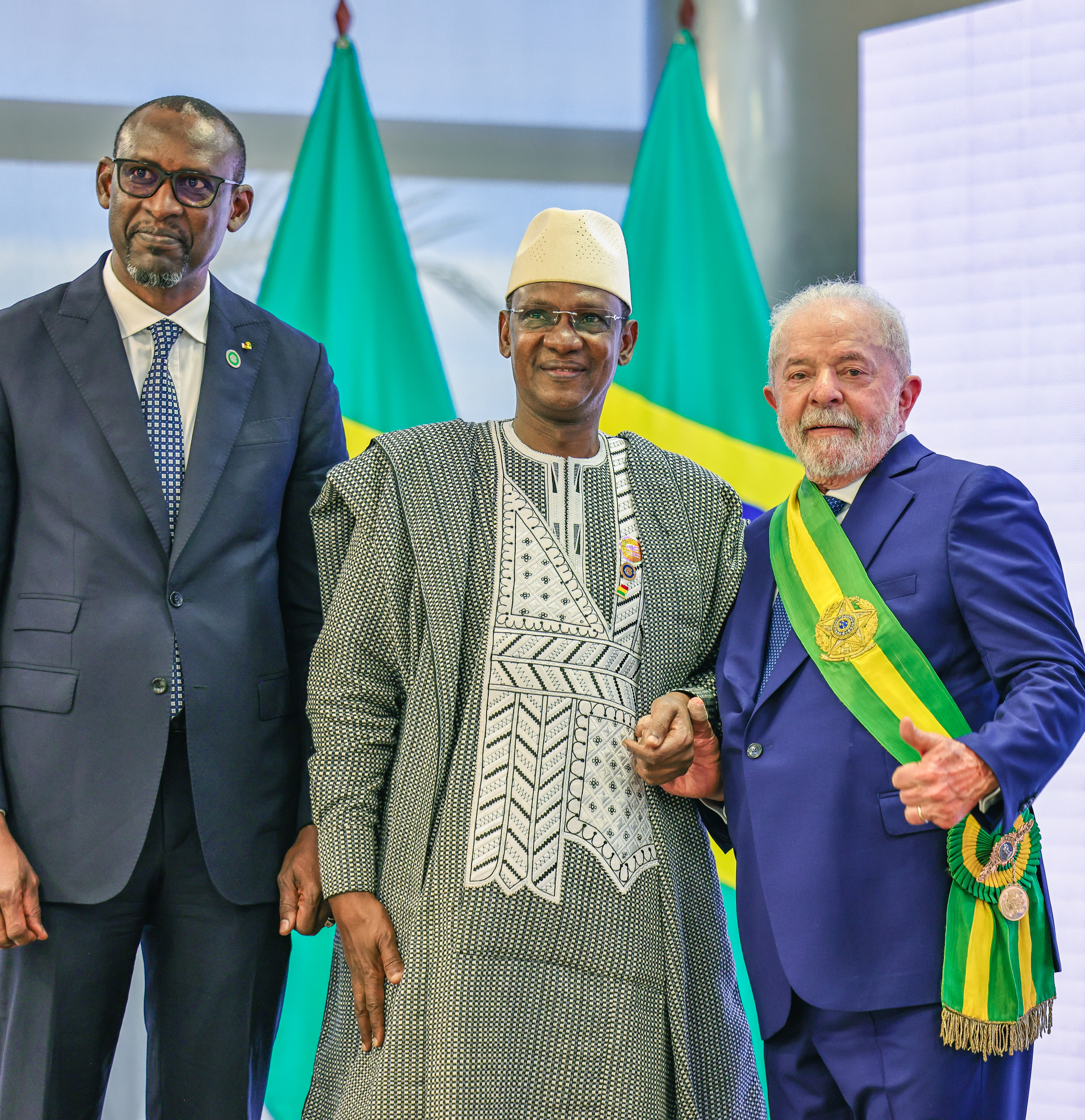
Choguel Kokalla Maïga (center) and Abdoulaye Diop (left) with Brazil's President Luiz Inácio Lula da Silva (right), 4 January 2023

On 25 May, former Nigerian President Goodluck Jonathan of ECOWAS began to lead mediation efforts with Mali’s military. From detention, both N'Daw and Ouane submitted their resignations to Goïta on 26 May. The military released the ousted leaders on 27 May. Some sources speculate that the resignation of N'Daw may risk further national instability.

On 28 May, Mali's constitutional court named Goïta the country's transitional president.

On 4 June, hundreds of supporters of the M5 movement, which was one of the leading opposition groups in the 2020 protests, gathered in the Independence Square in Bamako to celebrate the anniversary of the group's founding. Its supporters also appeared to rally in support of the new military government, as Goïta was reportedly considering naming a prominent M5 figure as a civilian prime minister after being sworn in as Mali's interim president on 7 June in an attempt to mend relations between the military government and the M5 movement, which had been deteriorating ever since the M5 movement was sidelined by the military-dominated transitional government formed after the 2020 coup. After his swearing-in ceremony was held on 7 June in Bamako, Goïta indeed named Choguel Kokalla Maïga, a leader of the M5 movement and former government minister, as the interim prime minister of Mali's transitional government.

On 11 June 2021, the military government restored Colonel Sadio Camara as Minister for the Defence. Camara had been excluded by the previous government from the new cabinet, which was allegedly also a motivator for the coup.

On 20 July 2021, Goïta survived an assassination attempt, after a knife-wielding assailant attempted to stab the interim President at Friday prayers at a mosque in Bamako. The attempted stabbing took place during the Islamic holiday of Eid al-Adha. The suspect, reportedly a young-looking man who has not been named, died in custody.

On 1 January 2022, Mali’s Foreign Minister Abdoulaye Diop announced he had proposed to ECOWAS that the transition period back to democracy, be extended by five years. In response, at an emergency summit in the Ghanaian capital Accra on 9 January 2022, ECOWAS decided to close their borders, sever diplomatic ties and impose tough economic sanctions on Mali, in response to its "unacceptable" delay in holding elections following a 2020 military coup.

At the ECOWAS summit meeting in Accra on 3 July 2022, the junta agreed to hold general elections by February 2024 in exchange for the immediate removal of sanctions.

== Response ==
The coup has been condemned by the international community.

The United Nations, through its MINUSMA peacekeeping mission, quickly condemned the coup and called for calm across the nation. António Guterres, the Secretary-General of the United Nations, called for calm and the release of the prisoners. Félix Tshisekedi, the President of the Democratic Republic of the Congo and head of the African Union, "strongly condemned any action that aims to destabilise Mali". French Foreign Minister Jean-Yves Le Drian also condemned the coup, saying "France condemns with the greatest firmness the violent act that occurred in Mali yesterday."

In addition, the United Nations, ECOWAS, the European Union, the United States, and the African Union issued a joint statement condemning the coup and called for the release of the arrested politicians. West African officials described it as an "attempted coup". The European Union and the U.S. State Department threatened sanctions.

On 31 May, ECOWAS suspended Mali, effective immediately until the end of February 2022, when Goïta promised to hand control of the country to a democratically-elected government. Although the bloc called on Goïta to appoint a new civilian prime minister and to form an "inclusive" government, it did not impose sanctions on Mali, as it had done after the 2020 coup. Additionally, on 2 June, the African Union suspended Mali, effective immediately until the country could reestablish "normal constitutional order," and urged the military to refrain from interfering with the Malian political process. According to its statement, if Mali did not return power back to civilian leaders, the Peace and Security Council would impose targeted sanctions and other punitive measures. On that same day, France suspended joint operations with the Malian military, as well as national advisory missions. The French Ministry of Armed Forces said that "the decision will be reassessed in the coming days." After consultations with the Malian military and neighboring countries in the Sahel region, France resumed joint military operations and national advisory missions in Mali on 3 July.

On 7 January 2022, Agence France Presse reported that Malian army officials claimed that Russian military advisors had arrived in the country – with about 400 Russian military personnel operating in Sahel state.

== See also ==
- 1968 Malian coup d'état
- 1991 Malian coup d'état
- 2020 in Mali
- 2020 Malian protests
- List of coups d'état and coup attempts since 2010
