= 2020 Malian coup d'état =

Military overthrow of President Ibrahim Boubacar Keïta

- Part of the Mali War, the 2020 Malian protests and the Coup Belt
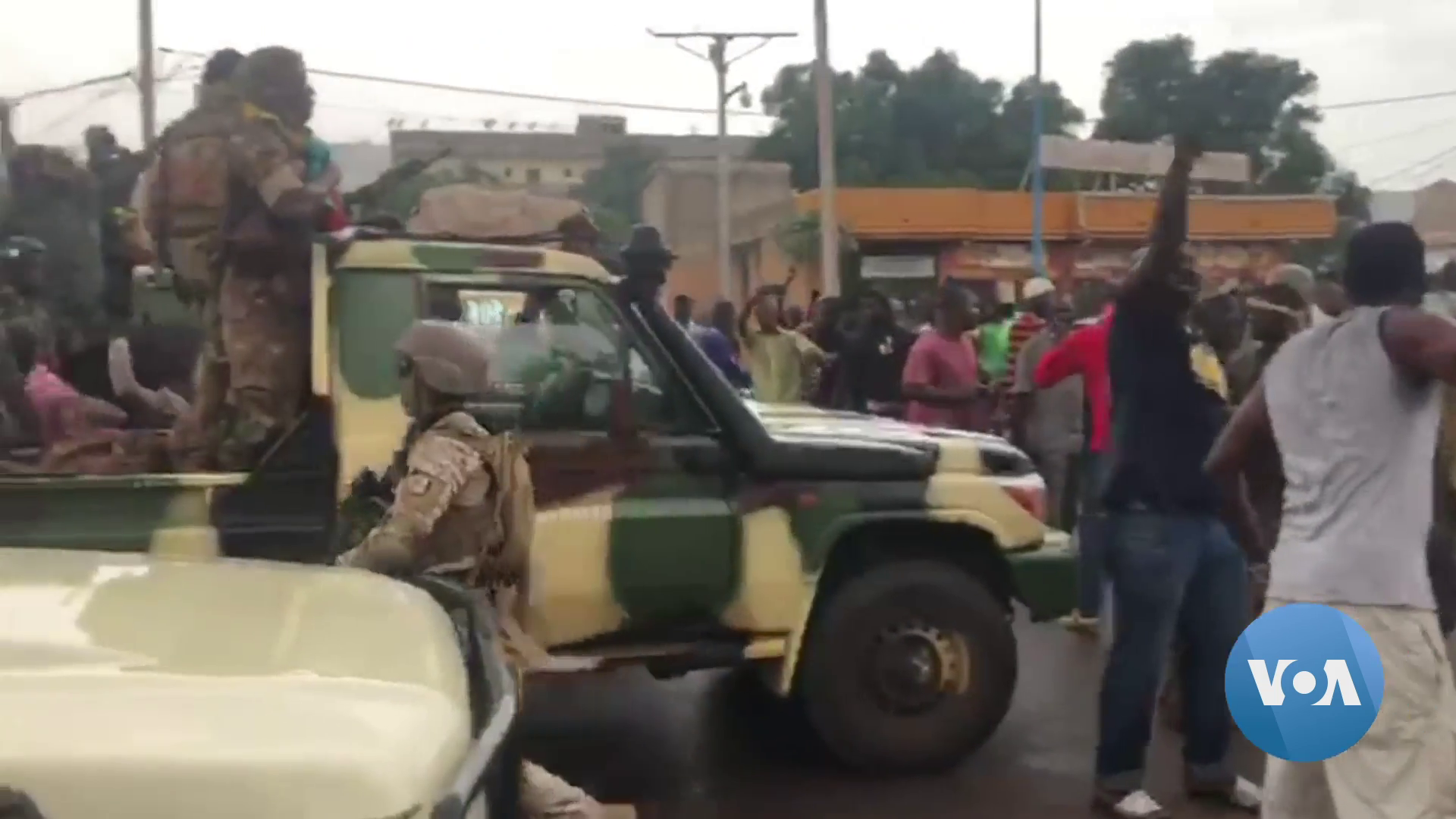
- Malian soldiers and cheering crowd in Bamako during the coup
Date	18 August 2020
Location	Mali
Result	Coup d'état successful: Resignation of the president (Ibrahim Boubacar Keïta), prime minister (Boubou Cissé), and the entire cabinet; Mali suspended from the African Union and ECOWAS; Mahmoud Dicko leaves politics; Assimi Goïta declares himself leader of the National Committee for the Salvation of the People

Belligerents
Government of Mali Supported by: France; China; African Union	(Mali) National Committee for the Salvation of the People: Malian Armed Forces; Supported by: Russia

Commanders and leaders
(Mali) Ibrahim Keïta (surrendered) (Mali) Boubou Cissé (surrendered)	(Mali) Assimi Goïta (Mali) Malick Diaw (Mali) Ismaël Wagué (Mali) Sadio Camara

On 18 August 2020, elements of the Malian Armed Forces began a mutiny, and subsequently undertook a coup d'état. Soldiers on pick-up trucks stormed the Soundiata military base in the town of Kati, where gunfire was exchanged before weapons were distributed from the armory and senior officers arrested. Tanks and armoured vehicles were seen on the town's streets, as well as military trucks heading for the capital, Bamako. The soldiers detained several government officials including President Ibrahim Boubacar Keïta, who resigned and dissolved the government. This was the country's second coup in less than 10 years, following the 2012 coup d'état. On a subregional level, the coup also marked an end to a period of nearly six years, since the 2014 Burkina Faso uprising and the ousting of Burkina Faso's president Blaise Compaoré, during which there was not a single undemocratic change of government in West Africa. For this subregion, where many countries have a history of civil war and violent conflict, 2014 to 2020 was a period of remarkable stability, during which ECOWAS found a peaceful resolution to the 2016–2017 Gambian constitutional crisis.

== Background ==
Protests in Mali had been ongoing since 5 June, with protesters calling for the resignation of President Ibrahim Boubacar Keïta. Protesters were displeased with the government's management of the ongoing insurgency, alleged government corruption, the ongoing COVID-19 pandemic, and a floundering economy. Eleven deaths and 124 injuries were reported during the protests.

=== Regional rise of terrorism ===
The Sahel region of Africa has become the global epicenter of terrorism, accounting for over half of all terrorism-related deaths, according to the Global Terrorism Index (GTI). In 2023, the region recorded 3,885 fatalities out of a global total of 7,555, marking a nearly tenfold increase since 2019. The surge in extremist violence is attributed to the expansion of groups like the Islamic State's affiliate in the Sahel and Jama'at Nusrat al-Islam wal Muslimeen (JNIM), who compete for land and influence while imposing strict Sharia-based governance. Political instability, weak governance, and the rise of military juntas following coups in Mali, Burkina Faso, Guinea, and Niger have further fueled the insurgency. These groups sustain their operations through ransom kidnappings, illicit gold mining, and drug trafficking, with the Sahel now a major route for cocaine smuggling from South America to Europe. Meanwhile, governments in the region have shifted their alliances from Western nations to Russia and China, relying on paramilitary groups like the Africa Corps (formerly Wagner) for security assistance, though with limited success. The violence is increasingly spilling into neighboring countries such as Togo and Benin, raising concerns about the broader destabilization of West Africa.

== Coup d'état ==
On the morning of 18 August 2020, soldiers began firing bullets into the air at a military base in Kati, a town 15 kilometres (9 miles) from Bamako, the capital of Mali. After moving into the capital, the mutineers arrested Minister of Finance Abdoulaye Daffe, the Chief of Staff of the National Guard Mahamane Touré, and Moussa Timbiné, speaker of the National Assembly. The Prime Minister, Boubou Cissé, appealed for dialogue with the mutineers, acknowledging they held "legitimate frustrations". A mutiny leader later claimed that Keïta and Cissé had been arrested at the former's residence in Bamako; African Union Commission chairman Moussa Faki confirmed that Keïta, Cissé, and other officials had been arrested and called for their release. A spokesman for the M5-RFP opposition coalition welcomed their detention, describing it as a "popular insurrection".

The officials were taken to the military camp in Kati where the uprising began. As news of the mutiny spread, hundreds of protesters gathered at Bamako's Independence Monument to demand Keïta's resignation. Protesters also set a building belonging to the Ministry of Justice ablaze.

At the time, it was not clear how many soldiers took part in the coup, who initiated it or who would now take charge.

== Aftermath ==
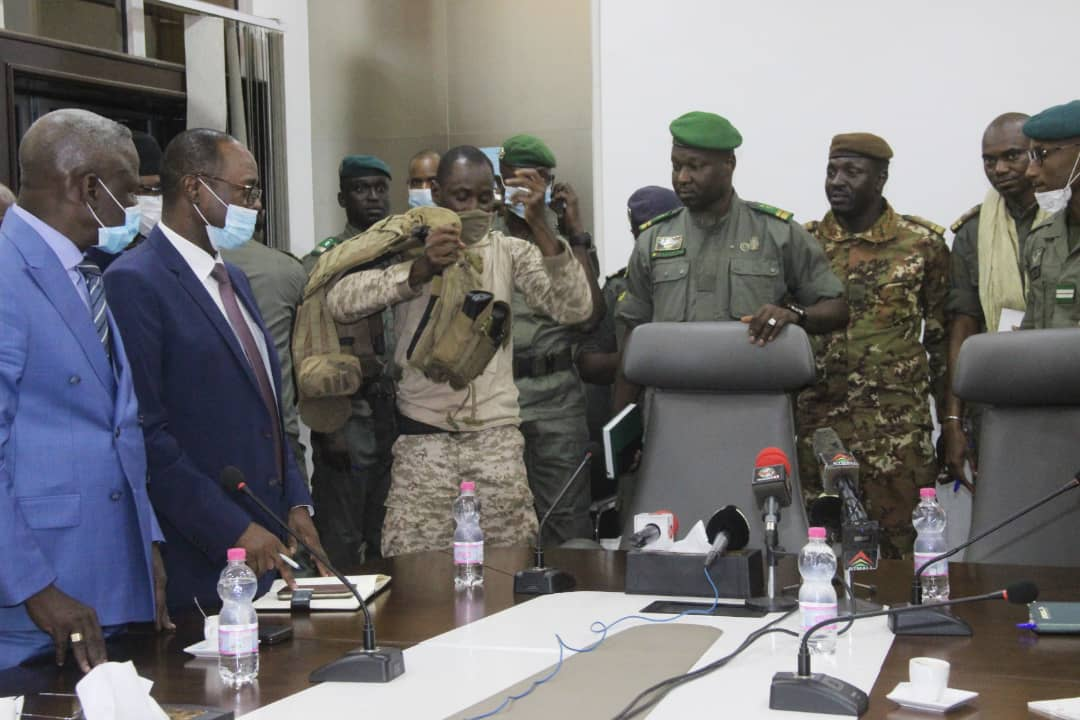
Assimi Goïta, surrounded by members of the National Committee for the Salvation of the People, 19 August 2020

President Keïta resigned around midnight, while also dissolving the government and parliament. "I want no blood to be spilled to keep me in power," he added. Five colonels appeared in the TV broadcast to the nation, led by Colonel Assimi Goïta. They called themselves the National Committee for the Salvation of the People. The bodies of four people killed by gunfire and about 15 wounded, all likely hit by stray bullets, were brought into one of the city's main hospitals, said Elhadj Djimé Kanté, a spokesman for the hospital union. The coup leaders denied that anyone had been killed, but soldiers were constantly firing in the air, cheered on by crowds of young people.

Military leaders had ordered closure of all border crossings and imposed a night-time curfew. "As of today, 19 August 2020, all air and land borders are closed until further notice. A curfew is in place from 21:00 to 05:00 until further notice," Col-Major Ismaël Wagué, Deputy Chief of Staff of the Malian Air Force, said in a televised address. He also invited opposition groups to talks for fresh elections.

Opposition member Mahmoud Dicko announced that he is leaving politics as a result of a meeting between him and some of the soldiers that took part in the mutiny.

Coup leaders promised new elections within a "reasonable timeline," without specifying what that meant.

Keïta left the country in September for medical treatment in the United Arab Emirates. Keïta, 75 years old, was originally hospitalised in the capital a few days before leaving.

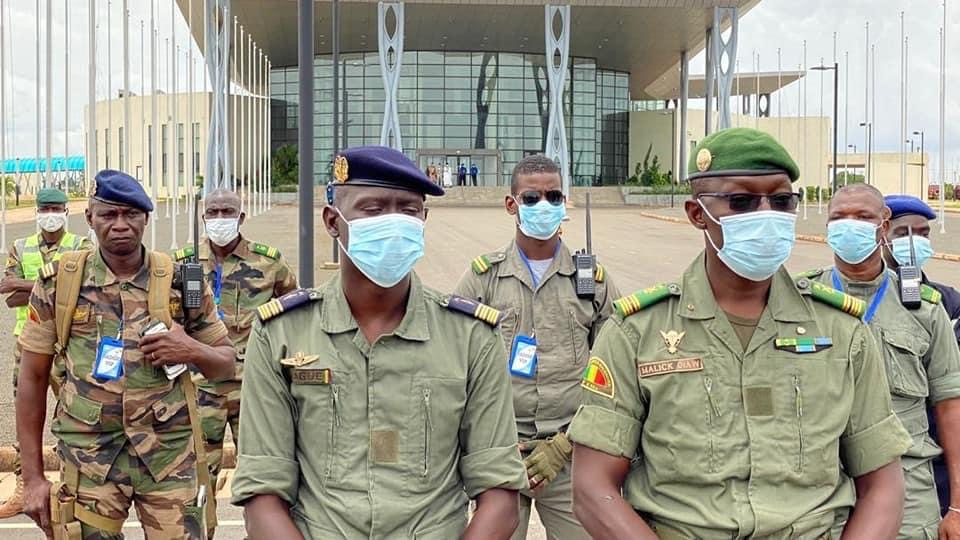
Ismaël Wagué (left) and Malick Diaw, 7 September 2020

Experts chosen by Mali's new military leaders proposed a two-year interim government led by a president chosen by them, despite calls by Mali's neighbors for elections within a year. They suggested that the soldiers behind the coup nominate the interim president and vice president and proposed for the interim president to choose the prime minister. Under the draft, the president would be from the civil or military sectors. The nominee must be between the ages of 35 and 75 and would not be allowed to run for election at the end of the transition. Right after the coup, military leaders promised to reinstate a civilian government and hold elections within a relatively short timeframe.

On 12 September 2020, the National Committee for the Salvation of the People (CNSP) agreed to an 18-month political transition to civilian rule.

On 21 September 2020 Bah Ndaw was named interim president by a group of 17 electors, with Goïta being appointed vice president. The government is supposed to preside over an interim period of 18 months. A spokesperson for political-religious leader Mahmoud Dicko praised his nomination as president. Leaders of the M5-RFP, active since the 2020 Malian protests, also signalled support. On 25 September the government was inaugurated.

On 28 January 2021, the transitional government announced that the CNSP had been disbanded. Although the initial agreement in September 2020 had stated that the CNSP junta would be dissolved as soon as the transitional government came to power, this had not yet taken place.

== International reaction ==
Representatives of several countries (Note: Including Algeria, Angola, Canada, China, France, Germany, Japan, Morocco, Nigeria, Russia, South Africa, Spain, Switzerland, Turkey, the United Kingdom, and the United States.) condemned the coup, as did representatives of the African Union, European Union, and United Nations. Emmanuel Macron, the president of France, a country which has been involved in fighting an Islamist insurgency in its former colony since 2013, called for power to be returned to civilians and for arrested leaders to be freed. The United States cut off military aid to Mali on 21 August 2020.

The United Nations Security Council unanimously approved a resolution condemning the coup and calling on the soldiers to return to their barracks and release all detainees without delay. Amnesty International also called for the release of the detainees. The Economic Community of West African States (ECOWAS) imposed sanctions on Mali and called on neighbouring states to close their land and air borders.

On 25 August 2020, the Organisation internationale de la Francophonie suspended Mali from membership and called for the immediate release of Keïta.

On 7 September 2020 at a summit in Niamey, Niger, regional bloc ECOWAS gave the Malian military rulers a deadline of 15 September to appoint a new civilian president and prime minister.

== See also ==
- 1968 Malian coup d'état
- 1991 Malian coup d'état
- 2012 Malian coup d'état
- 2020 in Mali
- 2020 Malian protests
- List of coups d'état and coup attempts since 2010
- 2021 Malian coup d'état
- Coupvolution
