= National Committee for the Salvation of the People =

Military government of Mali (2020–21)

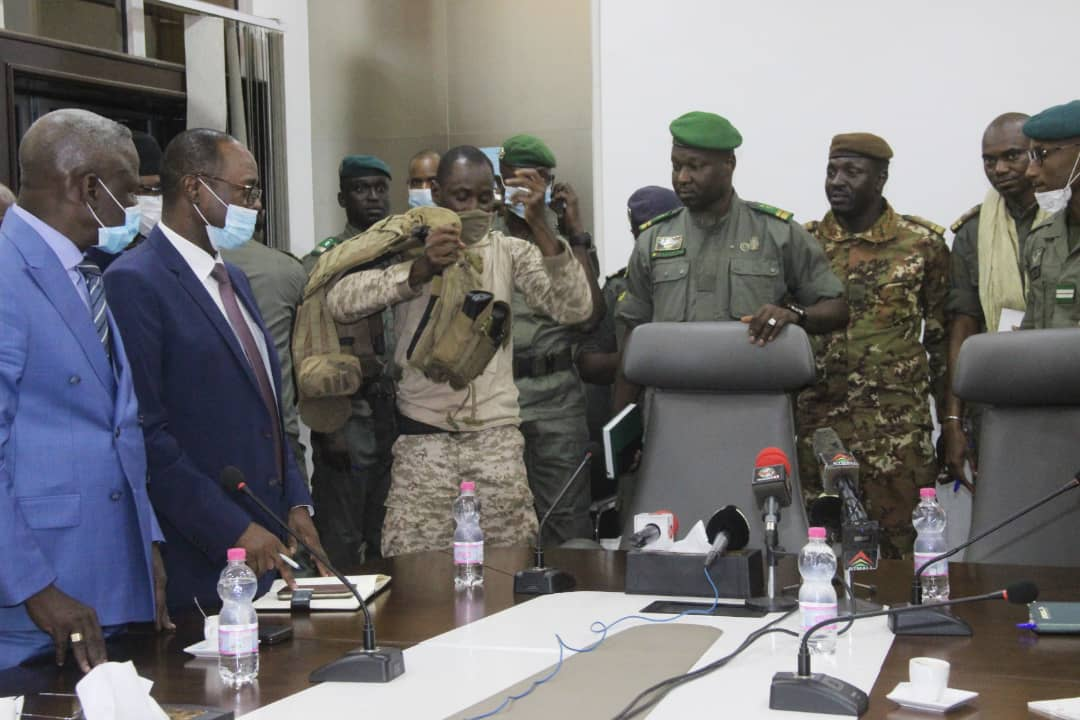
Members of the National Committee for the Salvation of the People before a press conference

The National Committee for the Salvation of the People (French: Comité national pour le salut du peuple, CNSP) was the ruling military junta of Mali from 2020 to 2021. It seized power during the 2020 Malian coup d'état and was formally dissolved by Interim President Bah Ndaw in 2021. However, the military junta has effectively remained in power since then as a transitional government under the leadership of the transitional president, Colonel Assimi Goïta. The CNSP originally consisted of five colonels, who were all promoted to army general.
