= Malian Armed Forces =

Combined military forces of Mali

- Forces Armées Maliennes
- Founded: 10 October 1960; 66 years ago
- Service branches: Malian Army; Malian Air Force; Malian Gendarmerie; Malian National Guard
- Headquarters: Bamako
- Website: fama.ml

Leadership
- Commander-in-chief: President Assimi Goita
- Minister of Defence: President Assimi Goita
- Chief of General Staff: Oumar Diarra

Personnel
- Conscription: Compulsory military service
- Active personnel: 40,000 plus 4,800 paramilitary forces

Expenditure
- Budget: $200–300 million ($5 million procurement) (FY03)
- Percent of GDP: 3% (FY01)

Related articles
- Ranks: Military ranks of Mali

The Malian Armed Forces (French: Forces Armées Maliennes, FAMa) consists of the Army (French: Armée de Terre), Republic of Mali Air Force (French: Force Aérienne de la République du Mali), and National Guard. They number some 7,000 and are under the control of the Minister of Armed Forces and Veterans. The Library of Congress as of January 2005 stated that "[t]he military is underpaid, poorly equipped, and in need of rationalization. Its organisation has suffered from the incorporation of Tuareg irregular forces into the regular military following a 1992 agreement between the government and Tuareg rebel forces."

In 2009, the IISS Military Balance listed 7,350 soldiers in the Army, 400 in the Air Force, and 50 in the Navy. The Gendarmerie and National Police (under the Ministry of Interior and Security) maintain internal security. The IISS listed paramilitary total force as 4,800 personnel: 1,800 in the Gendarmerie (8 companies), 2,000 in the National Guard, and 1,000 police officers. A few Malians receive military training in the United States, France, and Germany.

Military expenditures total about 13% of the national budget. Mali is an active contributor to peacekeeping forces in West and Central Africa; the Library of Congress said that in 2004 Mali was participating in United Nations operations in the Democratic Republic of Congo (MONUC, 28 personnel including 27 observers), Liberia (UNMIL, 252 personnel, including 4 observers), and Sierra Leone (3 observers).

== History ==
The Malian armed forces were initially formed by Malian conscript and volunteer veterans of the French Armed Forces. In the months preceding the formation of the Malian armed forces, the French Armed Forces withdrew from their bases in Mali.

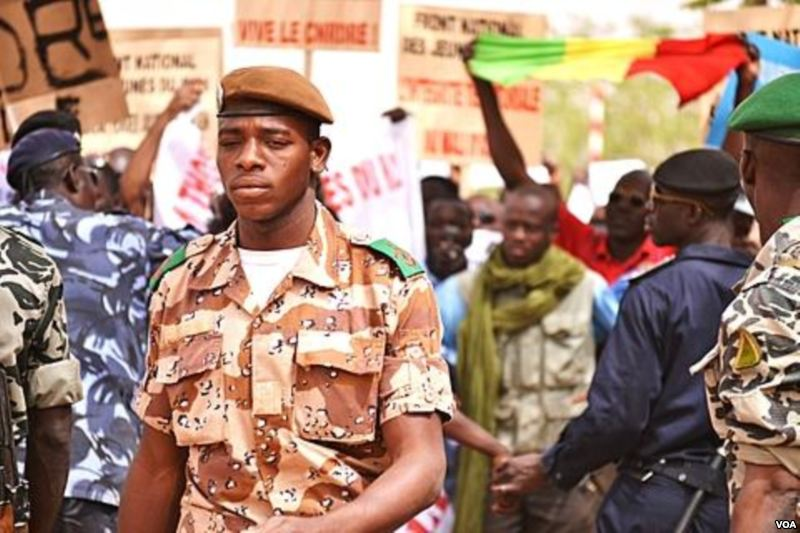
A national guard soldier walks by demonstrators at Bamako airport in 2012.

Among the last bases to be closed were those at Kati, on 8 June 1961, Tessalit (base aérienne secondaire), on 8 July 1961, Gao (base aérienne 163 de Gao), on 2 August 1961, and Air Base 162 at Bamako (base aérienne 162 de Bamako), on 5 September 1961.

On 1 October 1960, the Malian army was formally installed through a speech by Chief of Staff Captain Sekou Traore. On 12 October the same year, the army held its first parade in Bamako under the command of Captain Tiemoko Konate. The army initially consisted of a battalion in Ségou and included units scattered across the territory. A memo from the chief of staff ordered a realignment of the battalion. A command and services detachment in Bamako was created, and the engineer company in Ségou, the first Saharan motorized company of Gao, the Saharan Motor Company of Kidal, the Arouane nomad group, nomadic group of Timetrine (in the commune of Timtaghène), the 1st Reconnaissance Company and Nioro 2nd Reconnaissance Company Tessalit. By 16 January 1961, Mali's army totaled 1,232 men.

In the sixties and seventies, Mali's army and air force relied primarily on the Soviet Union for materiel and training.

On 19 November 1968, a group of young Malian officers staged a bloodless coup and set up a 14-member military junta, with Lieutenant Moussa Traoré as president. The military leaders attempted to pursue economic reforms, but for several years faced debilitating internal political struggles and the disastrous Sahelian drought. A new constitution, approved in 1974, created a one-party state and was designed to move Mali toward civilian rule. The military leaders remained in power.

Moussa Traoré improved relations with France and other Western countries after the coup, but Mali remained dependent on the Soviet Union for the arming and training of the Malian Armed Forces. Approximately 50 Soviet military advisors provided armour, artillery and parachute training to Mali's military, and trained all of Mali's pilots. The Soviets also improved the Malian Air Force base in Mopti, and occasionally used Malian airfields to stage supply flights for groups it supported in Angola.

Single-party presidential and legislative elections were held in June 1979, and General Moussa Traoré received 99% of the votes. His efforts at consolidating the single-party government were challenged in 1980 by student-led anti-government demonstrations, which were brutally put down, and by three coup attempts. The Traore government ruled throughout the 1970s and 1980s. On 26 March 1991, after four days of intense anti-government rioting, a group of 17 military officers, led by subsequent President Amadou Toumani Touré, arrested President Traoré and suspended the constitution. They formed a civilian-heavy provisional ruling body, and initiated a process that led to democratic elections.

The Tuareg rebellion began in 1990 when Tuareg separatists attacked government buildings around Gao. The armed forces' reprisals led to a full-blown rebellion in which the absence of opportunities for Tuareg in the army was a major complaint. The conflict died down after Alpha Konaré formed a new government and made reparations in 1992. Also, Mali created a new self-governing region, the Kidal Region, and provided for greater Tuareg integration into Malian society. In 1994, Tuareg, reputed to have been trained and armed by Libya, attacked Gao, which again led to major Malian Army reprisals and to the creation of the Ghanda Koi Songhai militia to combat the Tuareg. Mali effectively fell into civil war.

As of June 2008, service commanders were Colonel Boubacar Togola (Armée de Terre), Colonel Waly Sissoko (Armée de l'Air), Lieutenant-Colonel Daouda Sogoba (Garde Nationale) et du Colonel Adama Dembélé (Gendarmerie Nationale).

The Malian army largely collapsed during the war against Tuareg separatists and Islamist rebels in early 2012. In a span of less than fourth months at the start of 2012, the Malian army was defeated by the rebels who seized more than 60% of the former Malian territory, taking all camps and position of the army, capturing and killing hundreds of Malian soldiers, while hundred others deserted or defected.

Following the rebel advance, a group of soldiers from the Kati camp near Bamako staged a coup on 22 March 2012 which overthrew Malian president Amadou Toumani Touré. After the junta seized power, they successfully repelled a counter coup on 30 April by loyalists from the red berets elite units.

The Malian military was rebuilt by French forces, and is now capable of conducting counter terrorism operations. In February 2020, the army stated that up to 200 Malian troops arrived in Kidal, a Northern city. This was the first time the army was deployed in this area because of the Tuareg Separatists rebels that chased out the army since 2014.

On 1 November 2019, the IS-GS militants killed at least 50 soldiers in the 2019 Indelimane attack in the Ménaka Region of Mali.

Since the 2020 coup, the military received equipment from Turkish forces.

On 7 September 2023, at least 154 civilians and fifteen Malian soldiers were killed when al-Qaeda linked JNIM militants simultaneously attacked a Malian military camp at Bamba and the civilian boat Tombouctou on the Niger River near the village of Banikane, Gourma-Rharous.

In July 2024, CSP-DPA rebels and JNIM militants killed dozens of Russian mercenaries and Malian government forces during the Battle of Tinzaouaten. On 17 September 2024, JNIM militants attacked several locations across Bamako, the capital of Mali, including police and military installations, killing at least 77 people and injuring 255 others.

In September 2026 Amnesty International alleged that the Malian Armed Forces and Main Intelligence Directorate of the Russian Armed Forces proxies had killed at least 34 civilians in seven localities along the Mauritanian border, but within Mali, between June 2023 and December 2025. These killings had been committed by the FAMa and the Wagner Group (a front organisation for the Main Intelligence Directorate of the Russian Armed Forces), which had been active in Mali between late 2021 and June 2025). The report also documented torture, enforced disappearance, and theft from and destruction of ordinary civilians' homes. Captured Wagner fighters have also described Wagner mercenaries "deliberately inflicted severe injuries on African prisoners so recruits could practice battlefield medicine and killing techniques."

== Army ==
Manpower is provided by two-year selective conscription. Mali apparently has six military regions, according to Jane's World Armies. The 1st Military Region and 13th Combined Arms Regiment may be in Gao. The 3rd Military Region appears to be at Kati. The 4th Military Region is at Kayes and the 5th Military Region is at Timbuktu.

The 512 Regiment was reported within the 5th Military Region in 2004. In 2010 Agence France-Presse reported that French training would be given to the 62nd Motorized Infantry Regiment of the 6th Military Region, based at Sévaré. The same story said that the regiment consisted of three Rapid Intervention Companies (CIR) and AFP said it was "considered the elite...of the Malian army."

Mali is one of four Saharan states which created a Joint Military Staff Committee in 2010, to be based at Tamanrasset in southern Algeria. Algeria, Mauritania, Niger, and Mali were to take part.

The 134e Escadron de Reconnaissance (reconnaissance squadron) was to be trained to operate the French ACMAT Bastion APC by the EUTM Mali.

The Army controls the small navy (approx. 130 sailors and 3 river patrol boats).

List of Malian generals
Nº	Rank	Name	Corps of origin	Date of nomination
1st republic 1960 – 1968
01	Général de Brigade	Abdoulaye SOUMARÉ (deceased)	Infantry	29 December 1960
2nd republic, 1968 – 1991
02	Général d'Armée	Moussa Traoré (deceased)	Infantry	1974/79
03	Général de Division	Amadou Baba Diarra (deceased)	Armour	1981/84
04	Général de Division	Filifing SISSOKO (deceased)	Air Force	1982/84
05	Général de Division	Sékou Ly (deceased)	Armour	1984/86
06	Général de Brigade	Bougary SANGARÉ (deceased)	Infantry	1985/89
07	Général de Brigade	Abdoulaye OUOLOGUEM (deceased)	Infantry	1985/89
08	Général de Brigade	Amara DANFAGA (deceased)	Infantry	1985/90
09	Général de Brigade	Sory Ibrahim SILLA (deceased)	Infantry	1987/90
10	Général de Brigade	Mamadou COULIBALY	Air Force	1987/91
3rd republic, Alpha Oumar Konaré, 1991 – 2002
11	Général d'Armée	Amadou Toumani TOURÉ (deceased)	Infantry	20 January 1995
12	Général de Division	Bourama Siré TRAORÉ	Air Force	1997/99
13	Général de Division	Cheick O. DIARRA (deceased)	Air Force	1997/99
14	Général de Division	Kafougouna KONÉ	Infantry	1997/99
15	Général de Division	Tiécoura DOUMBIA	Artillery	1997/99
16	Général de Brigade	Mamadou DOUCOURÉ	Air Force	1997/99
17	Général de Brigade	Abdoul Karim DIOP	Engineers	1997/99
18	Général de Brigade	Siriman KEITA (deceased)	Infantry	1999/2000
3rd republic, Amadou Toumani Touré, 2002 – 2010
19	Général de Brigade	Seydou TRAORÉ	Infantry	2005
20	Général de Brigade	Salif TRAORÉ	Air Force	2006
21	Général de Brigade	Sadio GASSAMA	Infantry	1 January 2007
22	Général de Brigade	Toumani SISSOKO	Infantry	1 January 2007
23	Général de Brigade	Pangassy SANGARÉ	Armour	1 January 2007
24	Général de Brigade	Tiefolo TOGOLA	Infantry	1 January 2007
25	Général de Brigade	Brahima COULIBALY	Artillery	1 January 2007
26	Général de Brigade	Lassana KONÉ	Armour	1 January 2007
27	Général de Division	Youssouf BAMBA	Air Force	1 January 2007
28	Général de Division	Souleymane Sidibé (deceased)	Gendarmerie	1 January 2007
29	Général de Brigade	Naïny TOURÉ	Gendarmerie	1 January 2007
30	Général de Division	Gabriel POUDIOUGOU	Infantry	12 June 2008
31	Général de Brigade	Mahamane TOURÉ	Infantry	1 October 2010
32	Général de Brigade	Mamadou DIALLO	Infantry	1 October 2010
33	Général de Brigade	Kalifa KEITA	Armour	1 October 2010
34	Général de Brigade	Bégrélé SIORO	Air Force	1 October 2010
35	Général de Brigade	Mamadou TOGOLA	Air Force	1 October 2010
36	Général de Brigade	Siaka SANGARÉ	Air Force	1 October 2010
37	Général de Brigade	Samballa DIALLO	Gendarmerie	1 October 2010
38	Général de Brigade	Sirakoro SANGARÉ	Engineers	1 October 2010
39	Général de Brigade	Djibril SANGARÉ	DCSSA	1 October 2010
40	Général de Brigade	Mohamed COULIBALY	DCSSA	1 October 2010
41	Général de Brigade	Kani DIABATÉ	DCSSA	1 October 2010
42	Général de Brigade	Minkoro KANÉ	Infantry	1 October 2010
43	Général de Brigade	Youssouf GOÏTA	Infantry	1 October 2010
44	Général de Brigade	Yakouba SIDIBÉ	Artillery	1 October 2010
45	Général de Brigade	Ismaïla CISSÉ	Artillery	1 October 2010
46	Général de Brigade	Lamine DIABIRA	Armour	1 October 2010
47	Général de Brigade	Cheick Fanta M. MAIGA	Administration	1 October 2010
48	Général de Brigade	Hamet SIDIBÉ	Air Force	1 October 2010
49	Général de Brigade	Hamidou SISSOKO	Gendarmerie	1 October 2010
50	Général de Brigade	Idrissa DJILLA	Engineers	1 October 2010
51	Général de Brigade	Sékou Hamed NIAMBÉlÉ	DTTA (transmission)	1 October 2010
52	Général de Brigade	Mady MACALOU	DCSSA	1 October 2010
53	Général de Brigade	Fanta KONIPO (deceased)	DCSSA	1 October 2010
54	Général de Brigade	Amadou Baba TOURÉ (deceased)	Infantry	1 October 2010
55	Général de Brigade	Waly SISSOKO	Air Force	1 January 2012
56	Général de Brigade	Soumana KOUYATE	Air Force	1 January 2012
57	Général de Brigade	Mady Boubou KAMISSOKO	Gendarmerie	1 January 2012
58	Général de Brigade	Mamadou Lamine BALLO	Engineers	1 January 2012
59	Général de Brigade	Antoine Ibrahima NIENTAO	DCSSA	1 January 2012

Sources: Mali Actu 17 February 2012: Liste des généraux du Mali sous ATT : À quoi servaient-ils ? Quel sera leur sort ? and Le Monde-Duniya du 12 avril 2012: Les Generaux du MALI

== Equipment ==
The goal of this list is to comprehensively catalogue Mali's current and past inventory of (armoured fighting) vehicles and heavy weaponry. Historically a major recipient of Soviet military aid, frequent arms deliveries in the 1970s and 1980s turned Mali into one of the strongest militaries in western Africa, operating advanced equipment such as dedicated tank destroyers, S-125 SAM systems and MiG-21bis jet fighters.

Equipment currently in service with the Malian Army
Name	Image	Origin	In service	Notes
Tanks
T-54		USSR	N/A	(Rarely used operationally).
PT-76 Mod. 1952		USSR	N/A	(Rarely used operationally).
Type-62		China	N/A	(In operational condition but not in active use).
Armoured Fighting Vehicles (AFVs)
BRDM-2		USSR	N/A	
Infantry Fighting Vehicles (IFVs)
BMP-1		USSR	N/A	(In operational condition but not in active use).
Armoured Personnel Carriers
BTR-152		USSR	N/A	
BTR-60PB		USSR	N/A	(At least one operates without a turret).
BTR-70		USSR	N/A	
VN2C		China	N/A	
Fahd		Egypt	N/A	
Mine-Resistant Ambush Protected (MRAP) Vehicles
Typhoon 4x4		United Arab Emirates	N/A	
Gladiator		United Arab Emirates	N/A	
Typhoon 6x6		United Arab Emirates	N/A	(Armed with a HMG).
Tornado 6x6		United Arab Emirates	N/A	
Shrek One		United Arab Emirates	N/A	
OTT PUMA M36-15		South Africa	N/A	(Armed with a 12.7mm DShK).
Paramount Maurader		South Africa	N/A	
Casspir		South Africa	N/A	
OTT Casspir		South Africa	N/A	(Armed with a 12.7mm DShK).
RG-31 Nyala		South Africa	N/A	(Used by the Gendarmerie).
VP11		China	N/A	
Infantry Mobility Vehicles (IMVs)
Panhard PVP		France	N/A	(Armed with a 12.7mm M2 HMG).
ACMAT Bastion		France	N/A	
ACMAT Bastion		France	N/A	(Ambulance).
URO VAMTAC		Spain	N/A	
Stark Motors Storm		Qatar	N/A	
Kia KLTV		South Korea	N/A	(Armed with a 7.62mm PKM LMG).
VN-4		China	N/A	
Cougar		United Arab Emirates	N/A	
Python		United Arab Emirates	N/A	(Not yet seen).
All-Terrain Vehicles (ATVs)
Lynx CS/VP11		China	N/A	
Utility Vehicles
ACMAT ALTV		France	N/A	
ACMAT ALTV Ambulance		France	N/A	
MasstecH T4		France	N/A	
Kia KM420		South Korea	N/A	
Kia KM450		South Korea	N/A	
Kia KM450 Ambulance		South Korea	N/A	
Dongfeng EQ2500		China	N/A	
Toyota Land Cruiser		Japan	N/A	
Toyota Land Cruiser Ambulance		Japan	N/A	
Toyota Land Cruiser Prado		Japan	N/A	
Toyota Land Cruiser GXR		Japan	N/A	
Nissan NP300		Japan	N/A	
Nissan Frontera		Japan	N/A	
Mitsubishi L200		Japan	N/A	
Land Rover Defender		United Kingdom	N/A	
Land Rover Defender		United Kingdom	N/A	(Ambulance).
Towed Artillery
100mm MT-12 'Rapira'		USSR	N/A	
122mm D-30		USSR	N/A	
Multiple Rocket Launchers (MRLs)
107mm Type-63		China	N/A	
122mm 9P122 'Grad-P'		USSR	N/A	
122mm BM-21 'Grad'		USSR	N/A	
Mortars
60mm M57		Yugoslavia	N/A	
82mm 82-BM-37		USSR	N/A	
120mm PM-43		USSR	N/A	
(Self-propelled) Anti-Aircraft Guns
12.7mm DShK		USSR	N/A	
14.5mm ZPU-1		USSR	N/A	
14.5mm QJG-02		China	N/A	
23mm ZSU-23-4 'Shilka'		USSR	N/A	(Rarely used operationally).
Unmanned Aerial Vehicles (UAVs)
Hawker Q800X		France	N/A	
Trucks
ACMAT VLRA 4x4		France	N/A	
ACMAT VLRA 6x6		France	N/A	
Berliet GBC-180		France	N/A	
Renault T430		France	N/A	
Renault Kerax		France	N/A	
Renault Kerax Wrecker		France	N/A	
SNVI M120		Algeria	N/A	
SNVI M230		Algeria	N/A	
SNVI M350		Algeria	N/A	
Iveco 330.30 ANW		Italy	N/A	
Iveco Eurocargo		Italy	N/A	
DAF 2800 6x4		Netherlands	N/A	
MAN KAT1 4x4		Germany	N/A	
MAN KAT1 6x6		Germany	N/A	
MAN TGS 35.440		Germany	N/A	
Mercedes-Benz MB1017		Germany	N/A	
Mercedes-Benz Actros		Germany	N/A	
Mercedes-Benz Atego		Germany	N/A	
Magirus Eckhauber		Germany	N/A	(3. Generation).
Unimog 1300		Germany	N/A	
Unimog 1300		Germany	N/A	(Ambulance).
Ural-4320		Russia	N/A	
GAZ-3308 'Sadko'		Russia	N/A	
Dongfeng EQ1092F		China	N/A	
Dongfeng EQ140-1C		China	N/A	
Dongfeng EQ240		China	N/A	
FAW CA1122J		China	N/A	
Howo Sinotruk 4x4		China	N/A	
Howo Sinotruk 6x6		China	N/A	
Hongyan Genlyon		China	N/A	
Jiefang J5		China	N/A	
Sachman SX2190		China	N/A	
Engineering Vehicles
Caterpillar bulldozer		United States	N/A	
M-Boot		Germany	N/A	

=== Equipment formerly in service ===
Equipment formerly in service
Name	Image	Origin	In Stock	Notes
Tanks
T-34/85		USSR	N/A	
FT		French Third Republic	N/A	
Armoured Fighting Vehicles (AFVs)
BTR-40		USSR	N/A	
9P133		USSR	N/A	(Some repurposed as fire-support vehicles armed with ZU-23s).
Towed Artillery
76mm ZiS-3		USSR	N/A	
85mm D-44		USSR	N/A	
Multiple Rocket Launchers (MRLs)
132mm BM-13		USSR	N/A	
Anti-Aircraft Guns
14.5mm ZPU-2		USSR	N/A	
37mm M-1939		USSR	N/A	
Surface-To-Air Missile Systems (SAMs)
S-125		USSR	N/A	
Radars
P-12/18 'Spoon Rest'		USSR	N/A	
P-15 'Flat Face A'		USSR	N/A	
SNR-125 'Low Blow'		USSR	N/A	(for S-125), (Not yet seen).
Utility Vehicles
UAZ-452		USSR	N/A	
UAZ-469		USSR	N/A	
GAZ-69		USSR	N/A	
Beijing BJ212		China	N/A	
VW Iltis		West Germany / Canada	N/A	
VW T3		West Germany	N/A	
Land Rover Series III		United Kingdom	N/A	
Trucks
GAZ-66		USSR	N/A	
ZiL-131		USSR	N/A	
ZiL-157		USSR	N/A	
MAZ-537		USSR	N/A	
Ural-4320 Crane		Soviet Union / Russia	N/A	
Mercedes-Benz SK		West Germany	N/A	
Mercedes-Benz 1113		West Germany	N/A	(Double Cabin).
MAN Hauber		West Germany	N/A	
Magirus Eckhauber		West Germany	N/A	
Unimog Ambulance		West Germany	N/A	(Ambulance).
Renault R340		France	N/A	
Unknown Truck		N/A	N/A	
Engineering Vehicles
GSP-55		USSR	N/A	
PTS		USSR	N/A	
Hanomag Dozer		West Germany	N/A	
Grader		United States	N/A	
Unknown Loader		N/A	N/A	
Unknown Roller		N/A	N/A	

== Training establishments ==
The Malian armed forces have at least two significant training establishments:

- Joint Military School at Koulikoro
- Alioune Blondin Beye Peacekeeping Training School at Bamako (fr:École de maintien de la paix Alioune Blondin Beye de Bamako)

The Alioune Bloundin Beye school is the tactical-level component of a trio of three ECOWAS peacekeeping training schools: the Alioune Bloundin Beye school (EMPABB), the Kofi Annan International Peacekeeping Training Centre in Accra, Ghana (operational level), and the Nigerian National Defence College (strategic level). The school has trained over 6900 students since its opening and is currently supported financially and technically by seven countries and as well as the ECOWAS.

== Air Force ==
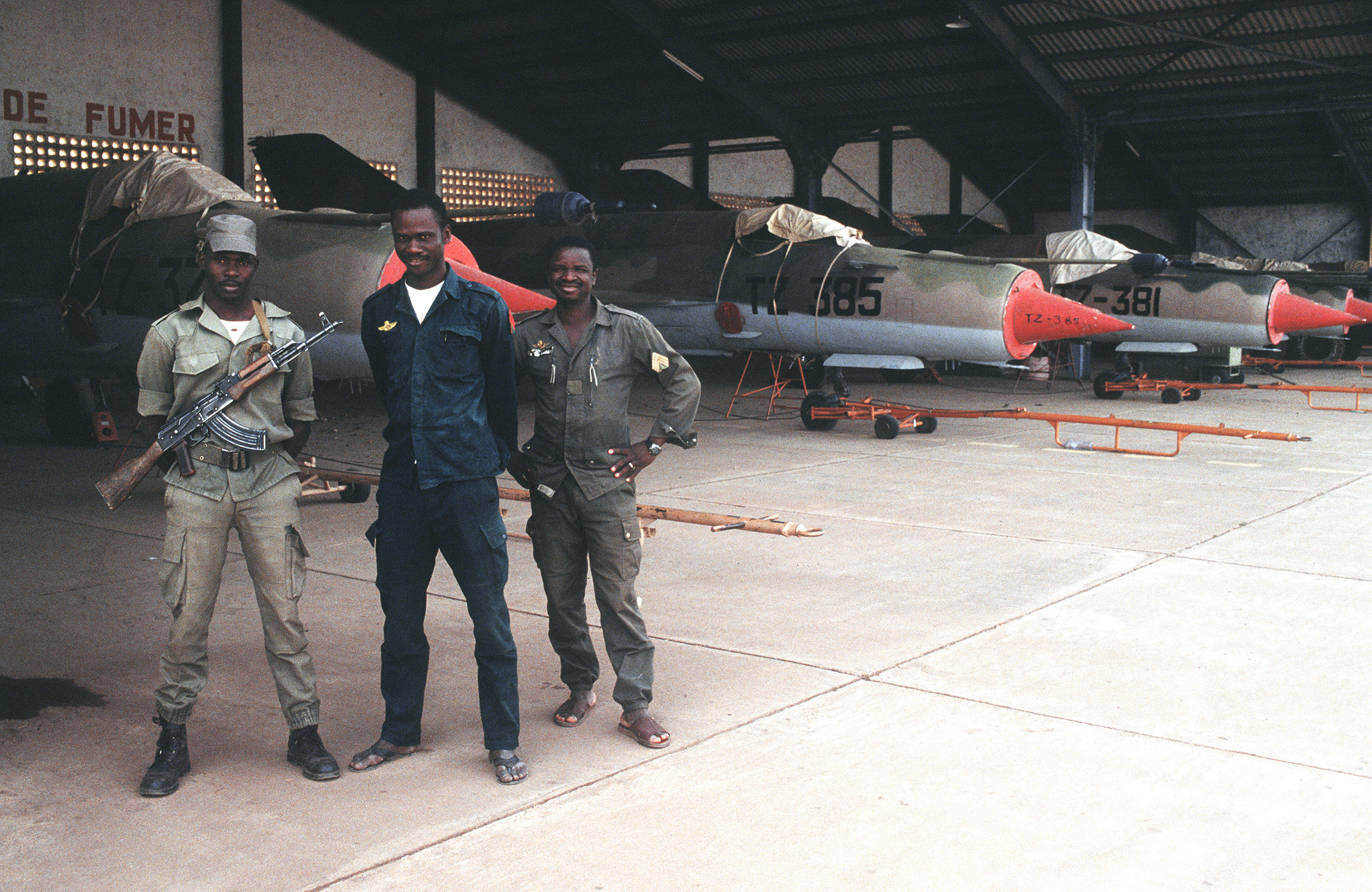
Malian soldiers stand MiG 21bis fighters at Bamako–Sénou International in 1997

The Mali Air Force (Armée de l'air du Mali) was founded in 1961 with French supplied military aid. This included MH.1521 Broussard utility monoplane followed by two C-47 transports until Soviet aid starting in 1962 with four Antonov AN-2 Colt biplane transports and four Mi-4 light helicopters. It used to operate MiG jets but is currently equipped with cargo aircraft, light attack aircraft and helicopters.
