= Madiakoye =

- Village
- Location in Mali
- Coordinates: 16°45′4″N 2°21′54″W
- Country: Mali
- Region: Tombouctou Region
- Cercle: Gourma-Rharous Cercle
- Commune: Séréré
- Elevation: 260 m (850 ft)
- Time zone: UTC+0 (GMT)

Madiakoye is a village and seat of the commune of Séréré in the Cercle of Gourma-Rharous in the Tombouctou Region of Mali. The village lies on the right bank of the River Niger, upstream of Gourma-Rharous.
