= Minkiri =

- Village
- Location in Mali
- Coordinates: 16°45′25″N 2°26′42″W
- Country: Mali
- Region: Tombouctou Region
- Cercle: Gourma-Rharous Cercle
- Commune: Hanzakoma
- Elevation: 261 m (856 ft)
- Time zone: UTC+0 (GMT)

Minkiri is a village and seat of the commune of Hanzakoma in the Cercle of Gourma-Rharous in the Tombouctou Region of Mali. The village lies on the right bank of the River Niger upstream of Gourma-Rharous.
