= Battle of Gourma-Rharous (2017) =

Battle in Mali

Coordinates: 16°52′48″N 1°55′26″W

- Part of Mali War
Date	April 18, 2017
Location	Gourma-Rharous, Mali
Result	Franco-Malian victory

Belligerents
Mali; Mali Armed Forces; National Guard of Mali; Malian Army; 33rd Parachute Commando Regiment; France	Jama'at Nasr al-Islam wal Muslimin

Casualties and losses
5 killed, 10–16 injured None	16 killed 4 captured
- 2 civilians killed

The battle of Gourma-Rharous took place on April 18, 2017, between French and Malian forces against an attacking Jama'at Nasr al-Islam wal Muslimin.

== Background ==
Jama'at Nasr al-Islam wal Muslimin formed in March 2017 as a merger of five jihadist groups that initially rebelled against the Malian government in 2012. Prior to the attack on Gourma-Rharous, JNIM had launched an attack on Malian forces in Boulikessi.

== Battle ==
At five in the morning local time, JNIM fighters attacked the military camp in Gourma-Rharous. At the time of the attack, the city was defended by units of the Malian Army, the Malian National Guard, in particular the 33rd Parachute Commando Regiment. The jihadists divided into two groups, and launched the attack with fifteen men in each group. One of the groups managed to enter the military base, but was quickly repulsed by Malian troops. Fighting then spread to the western part of the city. The attackers seized equipment and two pick-ups, and burned four other vehicles.

Malian authorities then alerted French Barkhane troops, who dispatched several helicopters. French forces intercepted the fleeing jihadists around thirty kilometers from the city, near Tin Ahara. Several jihadists were killed and two pick-ups were destroyed. MINUSMA helicopters were then dispatched to help the wounded, with the most seriously injured soldiers being taken to Gao for treatment.

== Aftermath ==
JNIM claimed responsibility for the attack that same day. French forces claimed the deaths or injuries of ten jihadists. Malian journalists later corroborated the deaths of six jihadists killed during the fighting for Gourma-Rharous, and ten killed and four captured by French forces. Two civilians were killed in the attack, both children.

The Malian government initially released a toll of four soldiers killed and sixteen injured, which was corroborated by the French government. This toll was updated to five killed and ten wounded on the evening of April 18.
