= KrAZ Cobra =

Cobra
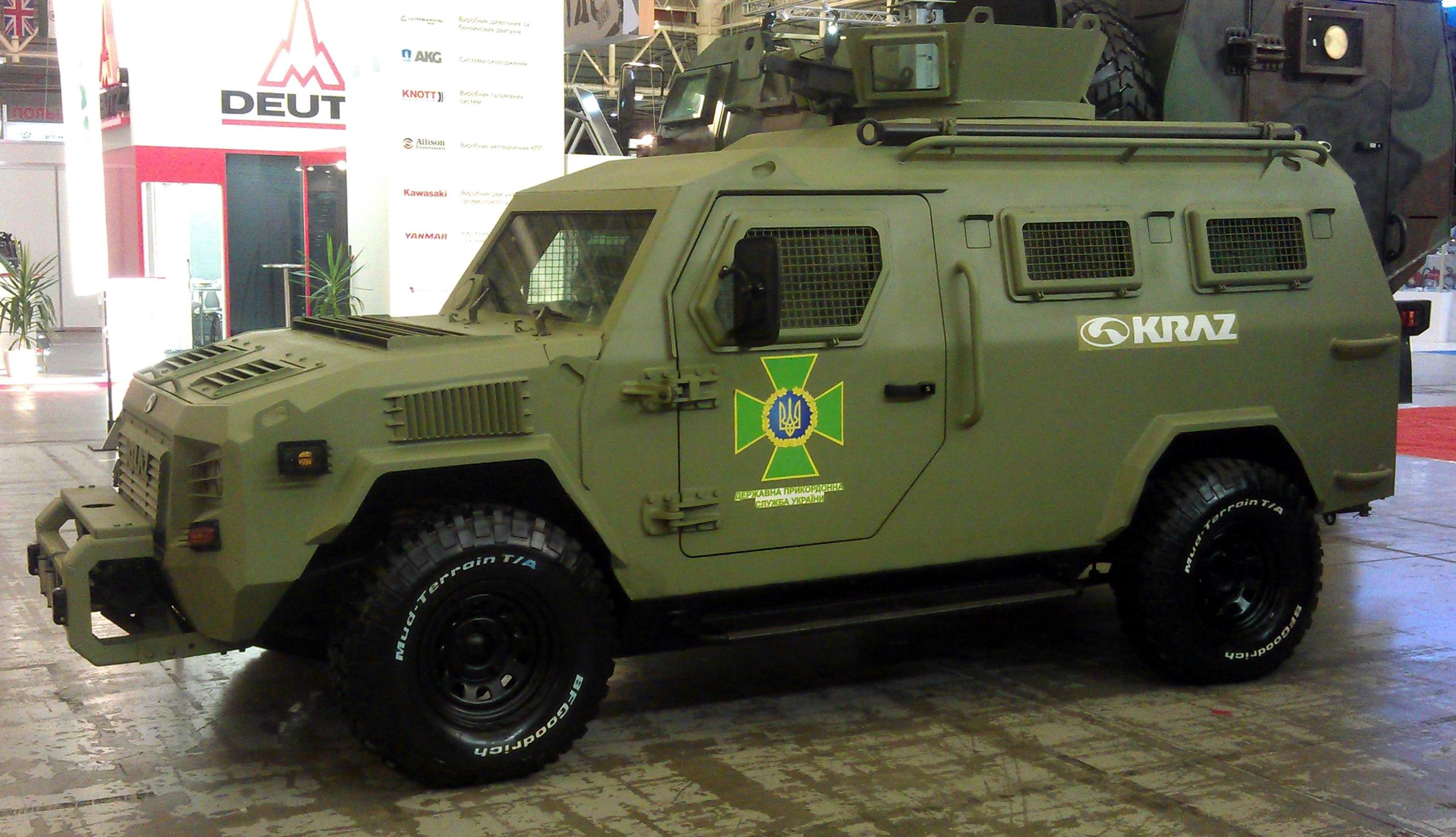
- A Cobra at a military exhibition.
- Type: Infantry mobility vehicle with MRAP capabilities
- Place of origin: Ukraine

Production history
- Designer: KrAZ
- Designed: Before 2013
- Produced: 2013–present

Specifications
- Mass: 6.5 t
- Length: 4.95m (16.2ft)
- Width: 1.97m (6.5ft)
- Height: 1.89m (6.2ft)
- Crew: 2 + 7 passengers
- Armor: Steel
- Engine: Toyota 4.5і gasoline (early) Toyota 5.7 TD (later); 236-381 hp
- Transmission: 6-speed automatic
- Suspension: Leaf spring 4x4
- Fuel capacity: 93 L
- Maximum speed: 110 km/h

The Cobra is an infantry mobility vehicle/APC developed jointly between the Ukrainian company KrAZ and the Emirati company STREIT Group.

== History ==
The Cobra was first unveiled in February 2013 at the IAV 2013 arms exhibition, alongside the Spartan and Cougar armored vehicles.

== Design ==
The Cobra utilizes the chassis of the Toyota Land Cruiser 200.

The standard interior layout has the driver and commander located at the front, behind the engine, with the passengers and gunner situated behind them. However, the interior seat layout can also be configured in other ways.

The Cobra is fitted with CEN 1522 FB6 angled steel armor plating on the hull. The fuel tanks are also protected by steel armor plating. The underside armor can withstand the explosion of two DM-51 hand grenades. The Cobra's tires are equipped with bullet-resistant Hutchinson runflat inserts.

The roof-mounted turret can be equipped with one 7.62mm machine gun, one 12.7mm machine gun, or one 40mm automatic grenade launcher.

== Service history ==
The Cobra entered service with the Ukrainian military in 2014. It has seen service with the Ukrainian Armed Forces during the War in Donbas and the 2022 Russian Invasion of Ukraine. As of November 2025, at least 15 AFU Cobras have been destroyed in the war following the 2022 Russian invasion. The Russian military has captured at least five, with one of these entering service with the Belarusian military.

In January 2025, Cobras were seen in Congolese service during a military parade.

== Operators ==
- Ukraine
  - Omega Group
  - 10th Mobile Border Detachment
  - 14th Chervona Kalyna Brigade
  - 15th Operational Brigade
  - 19th Public Order Regiment
  - International Legion
  - Other units
- UAE
- Russia
  - SOBR "Bulat"
- Belarus
- Democratic Republic of the Congo

== Gallery ==
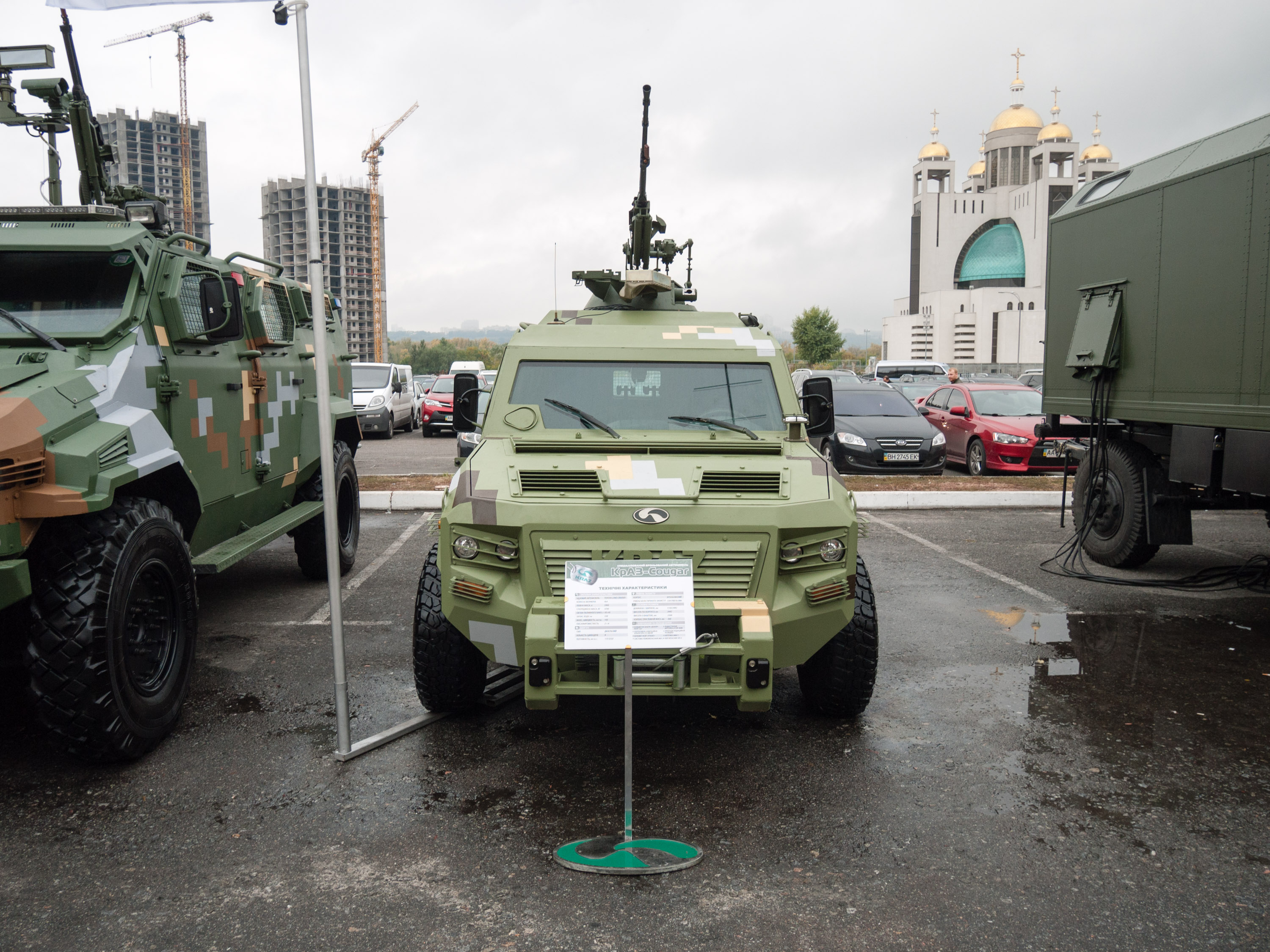
Front view

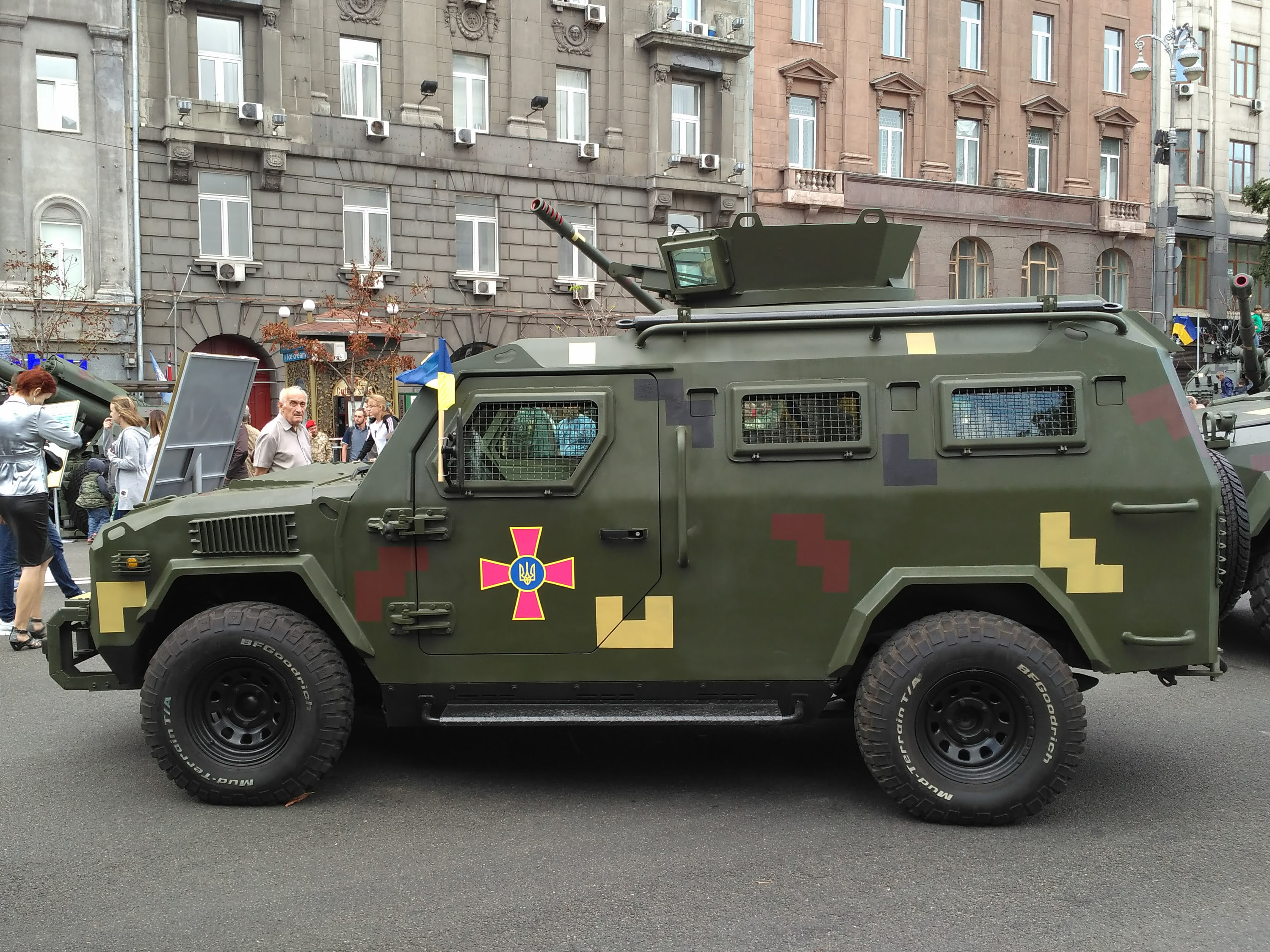
Side view

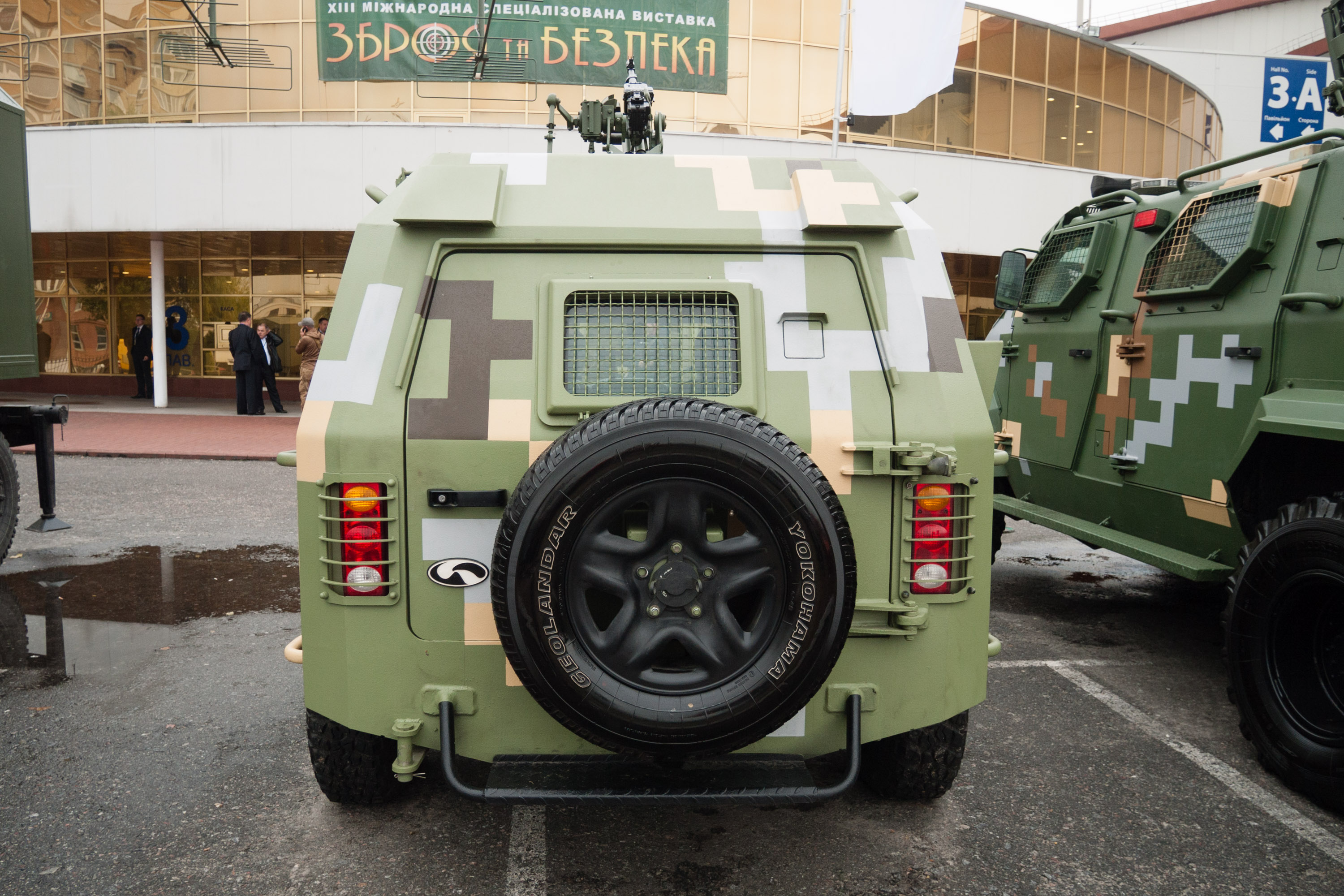
Rear view

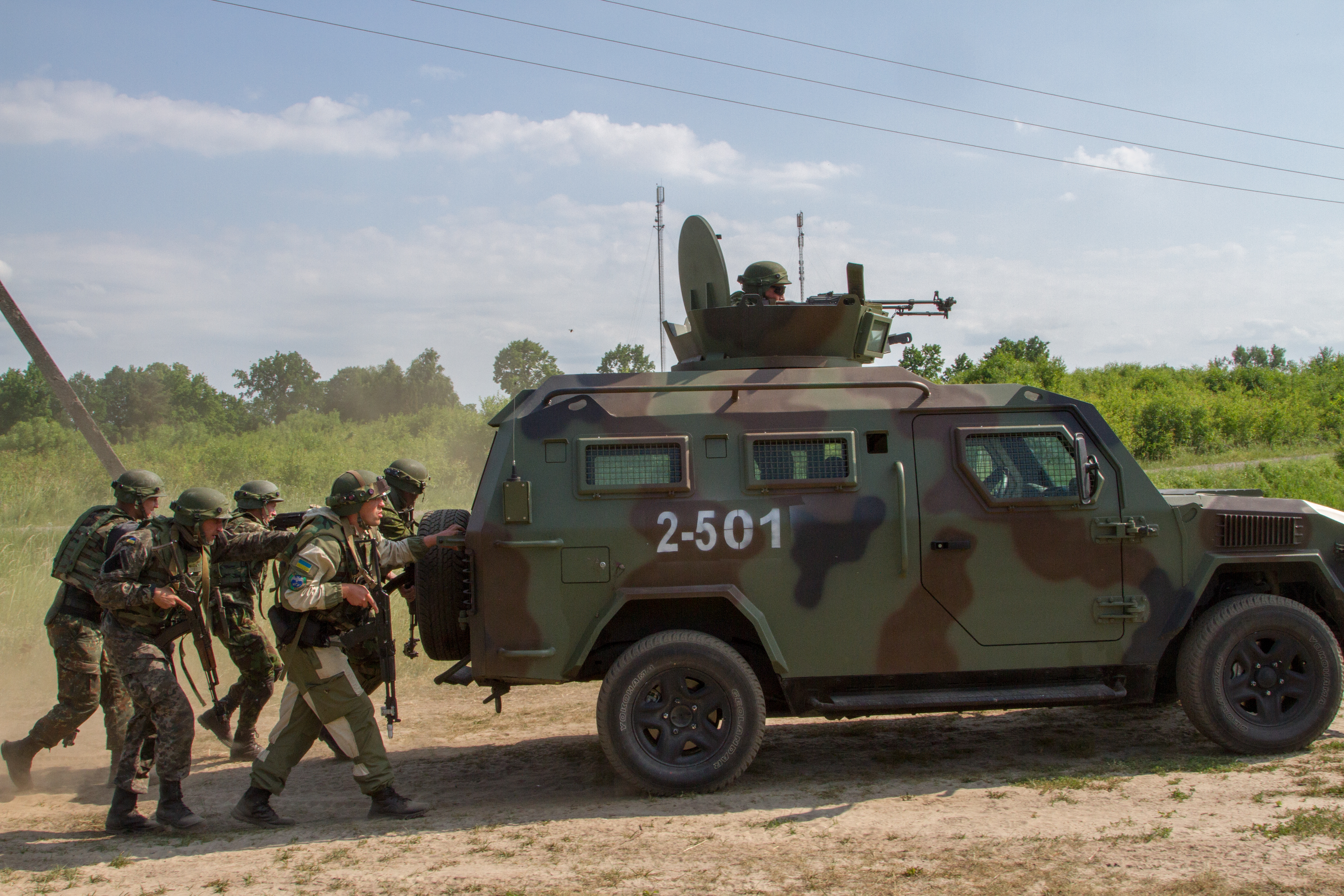
Ukrainian National Guard training with a Cobra

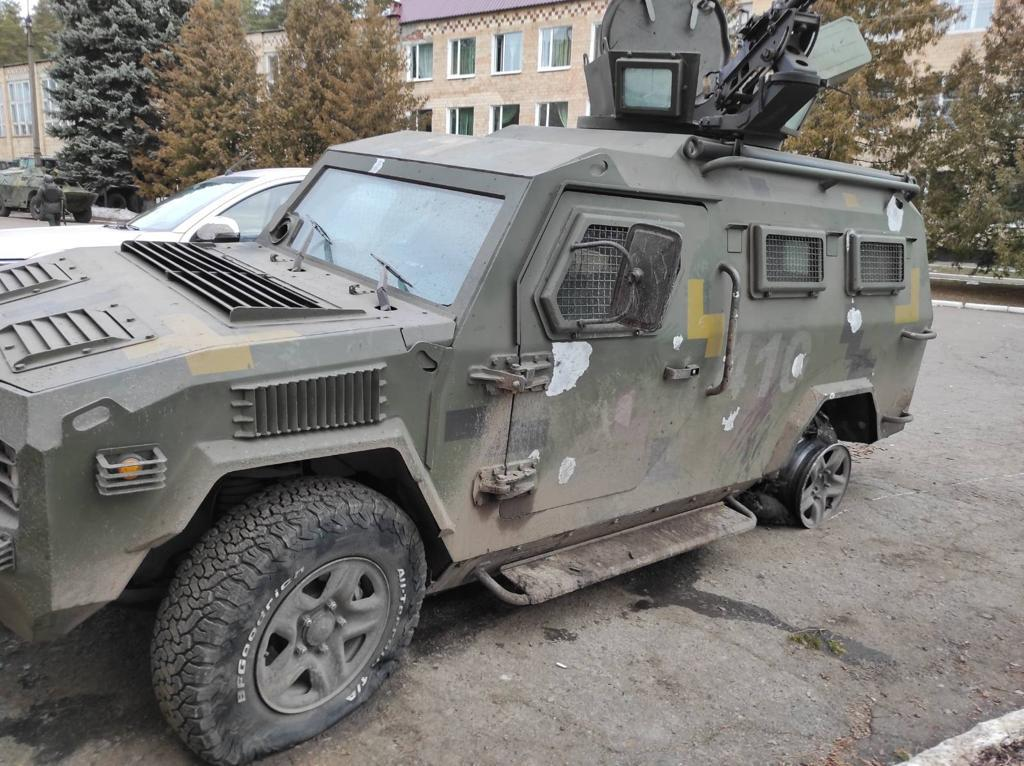
A Cobra damaged by pro-Russian militants

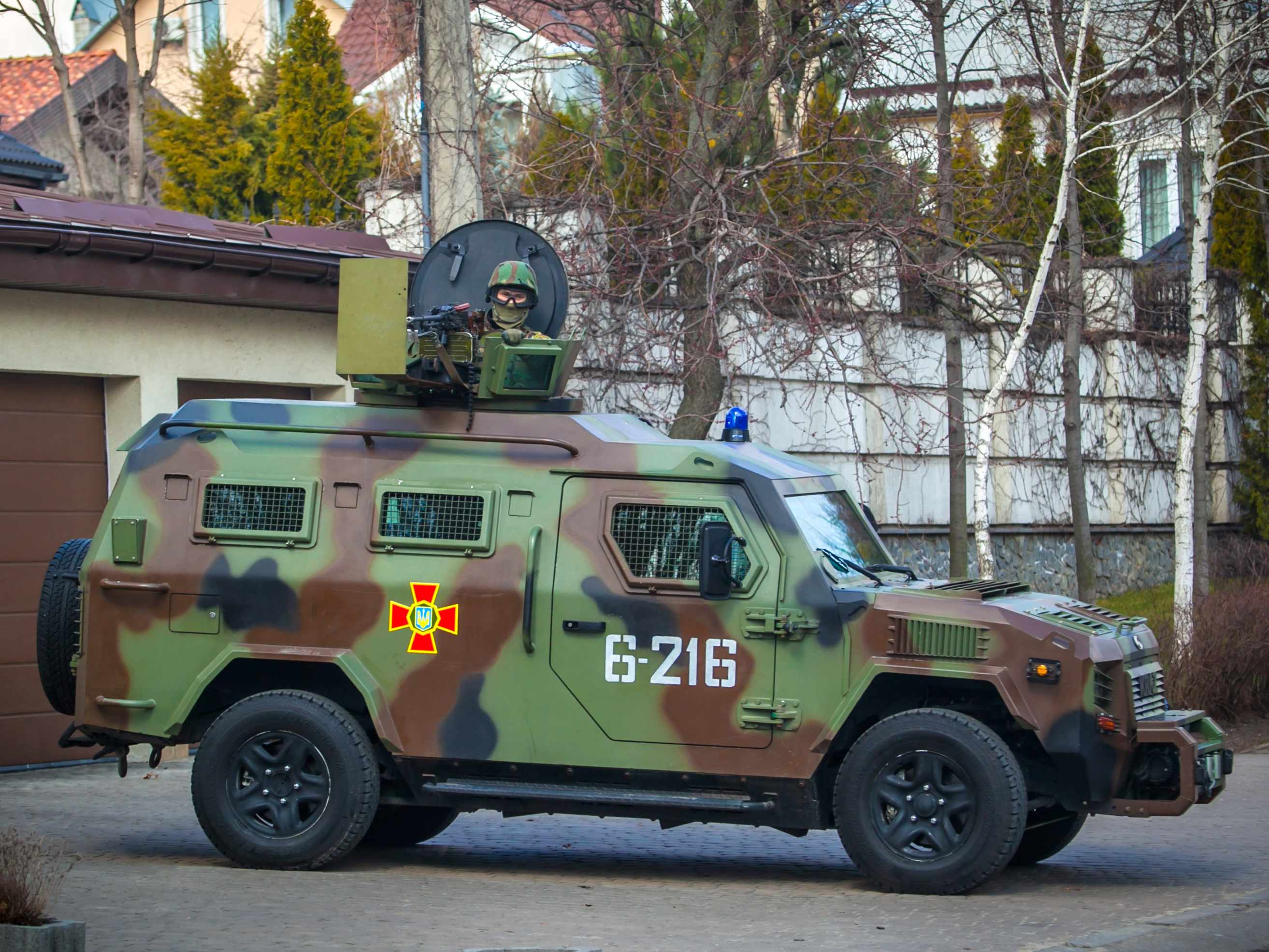
Cobra in service
