= 2015 Gourma-Rharous attack =

Attack in Mali

Coordinates: 16°52′48″N 1°55′26″W

- Part of Mali War
Date	August 3, 2015
Location	Gourma-Rharous, Mali
Result	AQIM victory

Belligerents
National Guard of Mali	AQIM

Casualties and losses
11 killed 1 injured	Unknown

On August 3, 2015, jihadists from Al-Qaeda in the Islamic Maghreb (AQIM) launched an attack on Malian forces in Gourma-Rharous, Mali. Eleven Malian soldiers were killed in the attack.

== Background ==
In late 2014 and early 2015, jihadist groups rebelling against the Malian government during the Mali War spread westward, conducting more attacks in Tombouctou Region, where Gourma-Rharous is located, and Mopti Region, in central Mali. In June 2015, Ansar Dine militants attacked Malian forces in Nara, a town on the Mauritanian border in west-central Mali.

== Attack ==
Jihadists from AQIM attacked a Malian National Guard barracks in Gourma-Rharous around dawn on August 3. According to a local radio official, the attackers wore black, and arrived in a vehicle and two motorcycles carrying a black flag, and chanted "Allahu akbar". The jihadists torched a Malian vehicle and left with another, which was also torched after breaking down en route. After news of the attack emerged, the Malian government sent reinforcements to Gourma-Rharous. The attack was claimed that same day by AQIM.

== Aftermath ==
Two military sources within the Malian army told AFP a few hours after the attack that ten soldiers were killed and two others were injured during the attack. The Malian government released a statement that evening stating eleven soldiers were killed and one was injured. The Malian government announced on August 6 that five suspects were arrested in connection with the attack.
