= Spartan APC =

Spartan APC may refer to the following types of armoured personnel carriers:

- FV103 Spartan, a British Army tracked vehicle
- Streit Group Spartan APC, a wheeled vehicle of Canadian origin
