= Tombouctou and Bamba attacks =

Islamist massacres in West Africa on 7 September 2023

- Part of Mali War
Date	7 September 2023
Location	Banikane and Bamba, Mali
Result	JNIM victory: Hundreds of passengers drown on the Tombouctou; JNIM briefly occupies Malian camp at Bamba

Belligerents
Mali	Jama'at Nasr al-Islam wal Muslimin

Casualties and losses
15+ killed (per Mali)	50 killed (per Mali)
- 154+ civilians killed on the Tombouctou

On 7 September 2023, at least 154 civilians and fifteen Malian soldiers were killed when Jama'at Nasr al-Islam wal Muslimin (JNIM) militants simultaneously attacked a Malian military camp at Bamba and the civilian boat Tombouctou on the Niger River near the village of Banikane, Gourma-Rharous. The attacks prompted the Malian junta that took power in 2021 to postpone the upcoming 2024 presidential election indefinitely. The attack on the Tombouctou in particular was considered by Malian officials to be one of the deadliest terror attacks in the country's history.

== Background ==
Since 8 August 2023, JNIM began imposing a siege on the city of Timbuktu, heavily affecting the freedom of movement on roads and waterways in the area. Due to the area's poor road infrastructure, the Niger river acts as an important transportation route. The Timbuktu, a boat owned by the Malian state-owned shipping company Compagnie Malienne de Navigation (COMANAV), had a capacity of 300 passengers and operated a route between Mopti and Timbuktu. It had previously been attacked by rockets on 1 September, resulting in the death of a 12-year old and injuring a soldier and boat driver.

Despite having a capacity of 300, the Tombouctou was overloaded on the day of the attack, with over 500 people on board including Malian soldiers.

== Attacks ==
=== Attack on the Tombouctou ===
JNIM jihadists attacked the Tombouctou between 10:30 and 11:00 am on September 7 as the vessel was traveling along the river between the villages of Abokoira and Zorghoi, having left from Mopti en route to Gao. The attackers launched three rockets towards the boat's engines, and Malian soldiers on the upper deck of the boat began exchanging fire with JNIM after the second rocket. The engines exploded and the ship caught fire from the rockets. Passengers began jumping off the side of the boat into the river, with some drowning. Other civilians who were stuck on the inside of the boat were unable to get out. Four hundred survivors made their way to the banks of the river, and were transported to Gourma-Rharous. Malian officials aided in the evacuation, and the mayor of Gourma-Rharous sent lifeguards to help drowning passengers.

According to witness testimonies, recovery efforts recovered sixty-seven bodies by 5 PM, and then another eighty-seven, leading to a total of 154 dead. This was after they had initially counted 120 dead before finding several more that had been swept away by currents. A statement by the United Nations Children's Fund (UNICEF) on September 11 confirmed that among the dead were twenty-four children, with nine other children receiving hospital treatment.

=== Attack on Bamba military camp ===
Two hours after the attack on the Timbuktu, a separate attack was carried out on a Mali military camp in Bamba, east of the Tombouctou's location. JNIM was able to take control of the base, briefly occupying it and looting weaponry. The junta later stated that Malian defenders suffered injuries and material damage when defending the military camp.

== Aftermath and impact ==
=== Attack on Gao ===
Starting at around 7:00 GMT on 8 September, JNIM began attacks on a Malian military camp and the international airport in Gao using shells and two suicide vehicles. According to Radio France Internationale, one of the suicide vehicles managed to breach the camp and gunfire was then heard. The Malian Armed Forces described it as a 'complex suicide attack'. Access to Gao was subsequently blocked and the airport was temporarily closed.

In response to the attack, the Bundeswehr announced that 850 German soldiers stationed nearby had been moved to protective facilities.

=== Perpetrators ===
JNIM claimed responsibility for the attacks on the Tombouctou and Bamba on September 7. The Malian government also accused JNIM of responsibility in its official report on the attacks. Several Malian social media accounts had initially accused the Coordination of Azawad Movements (CMA) of being responsible for the September 7 attacks, but this was denied by the CMA.

=== Casualties ===
The Malian government's preliminary report on the attack announced a death toll of forty-nine civilians and fifteen soldiers killed in both attacks. The junta also stated fifty jihadists were killed in both attacks. In the statement, the government declared three days of national mourning starting on September 8. A blood donation campaign was launched at Gao hospital in the days following the attack.

No updates were given on the attacks by the Malian government in the days that followed, and there was no discernment between the casualties at Bamba and on the Tombouctou. RFI reported on September 11 that local medical and military sources reported over a hundred casualties. Dozens of bodies were buried on the banks of the river after being recovered, and dozens more were missing. On September 15, the head of a village near the Tombouctou attack stated over a hundred people had been buried excluding those who perished when the boat sank.

A November 2023 Human Rights Watch report assessed that at least 120 people were killed during the attack, citing witness testimony. One survivor who accompanied rescuers to the site of the attack stated that 154 bodies were recovered.

== Reactions ==
- African Union: Moussa Faki, Chairperson of the African Union Commission, condemned the September 7 attacks the following day, and reaffirmed the African Union's support to the people of Mali.
