= KrAZ Cougar =

Cougar
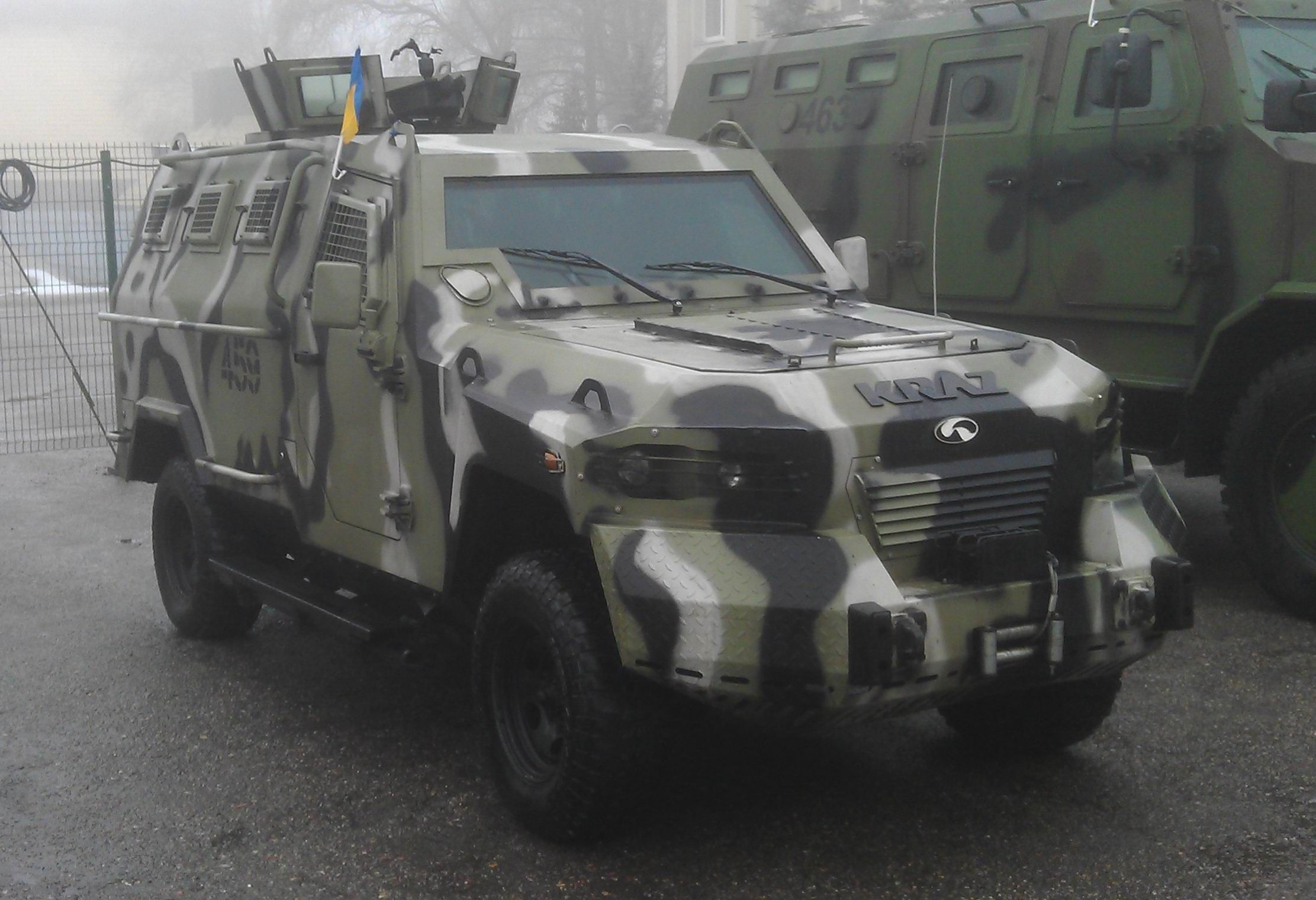
- A Cougar at a military exhibition.
- Type: Infantry mobility vehicle with MRAP capabilities
- Place of origin: Ukraine

Production history
- Designer: KrAZ
- Designed: Before 2013
- Produced: 2014–present

Specifications
- Mass: 6.5 t
- Crew: 2 + 8 passengers
- Armor: Steel
- Engine: Toyota 4.5і gasoline (early) Toyota 4.0 TD (later); 218-240 hp
- Suspension: Leaf spring 4x4
- Fuel capacity: 180 L
- Maximum speed: 105 km/h

The KrAZ Cougar is a 4x4 light infantry mobility vehicle designed by the Ukrainian vehicle manufacturer KrAZ. It is a license-produced copy of a vehicle by the UAE-based STREIT Group company.

== Design ==
The Cougar is built on the chassis of the Toyota Land Cruiser 79. The engine is located in the front of the vehicle, with the crew compartment located behind. The crew compartment houses two people in the front (driver and commander) and up to six passengers in the rear compartment. The vehicle utilizes a manual 5-speed gearbox. In terms of armor, the Cougar is equipped with CEN level BR6 ballistic protection, as well as bulletproof glass.

== Armament ==
The KrAZ Cougar can be fitted with a variety of weapons in the roof-mounted turret. The standard armament is a 12.7mm PKT machine gun along with a 40mm automatic grenade launcher. A number of remote weapons stations can also be equipped.

== Service history ==
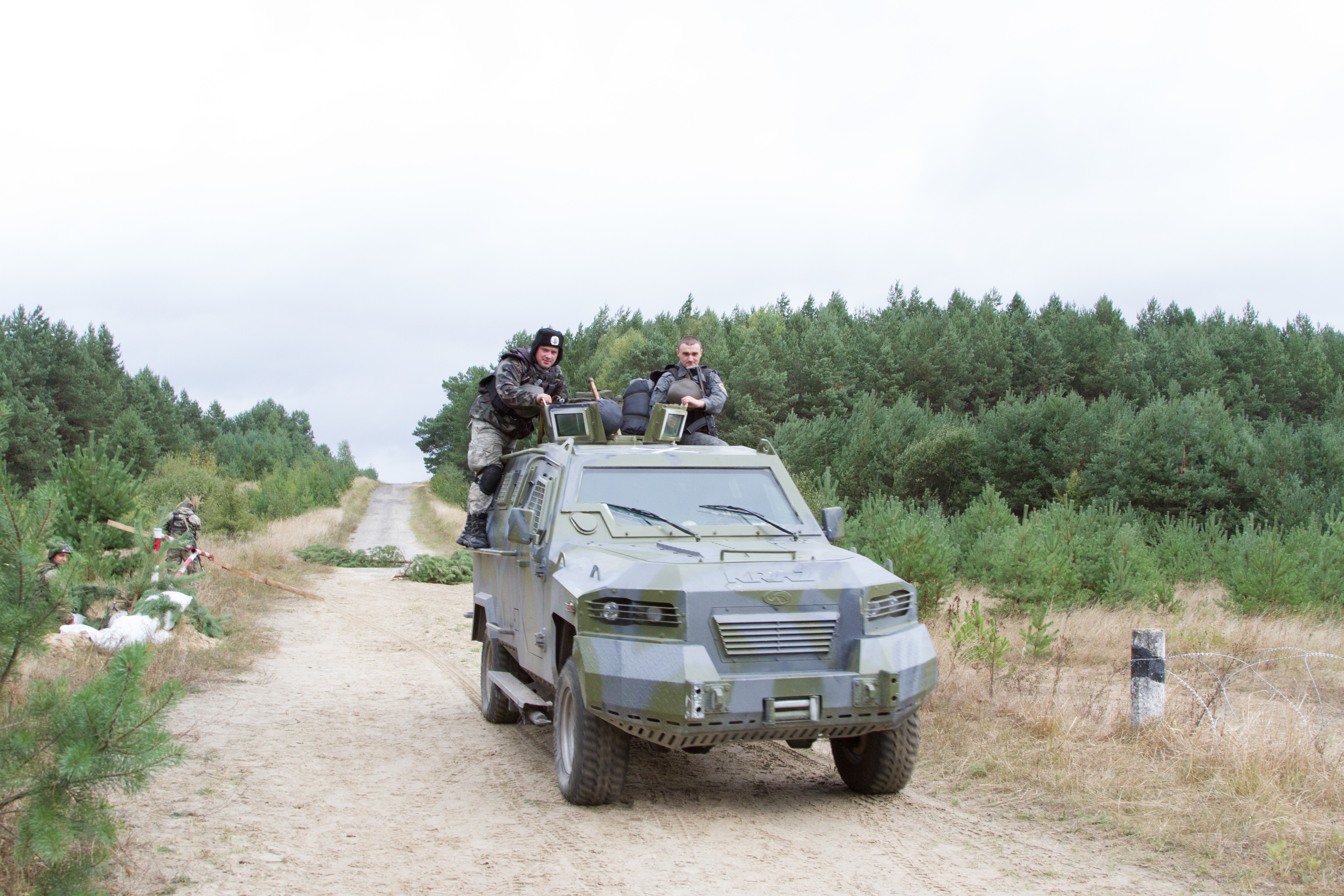
A National Guard Cougar in September 2015, near Yavoriv, Ukraine.

The OSCE operated 10 Cougars donated by the Ukrainian Armed Forces, which were used extensively during the War in Donbas. When the OSCE Mission to Ukraine ended in 2022, the vehicles were returned to the Ukrainian military.

During a parade on May 17, 2017, at least two KrAZ Cougar vehicles were seen in service with the Libyan National Army.

During the 2022 Russian invasion, at least four Cougars were destroyed, and another four were captured.

== Operators ==
- Ukraine
- Russia - at least 4 captured from Ukraine
- Pakistan - STREIT Group Cougar 2 LAMV, locally manufactured.

== Gallery ==
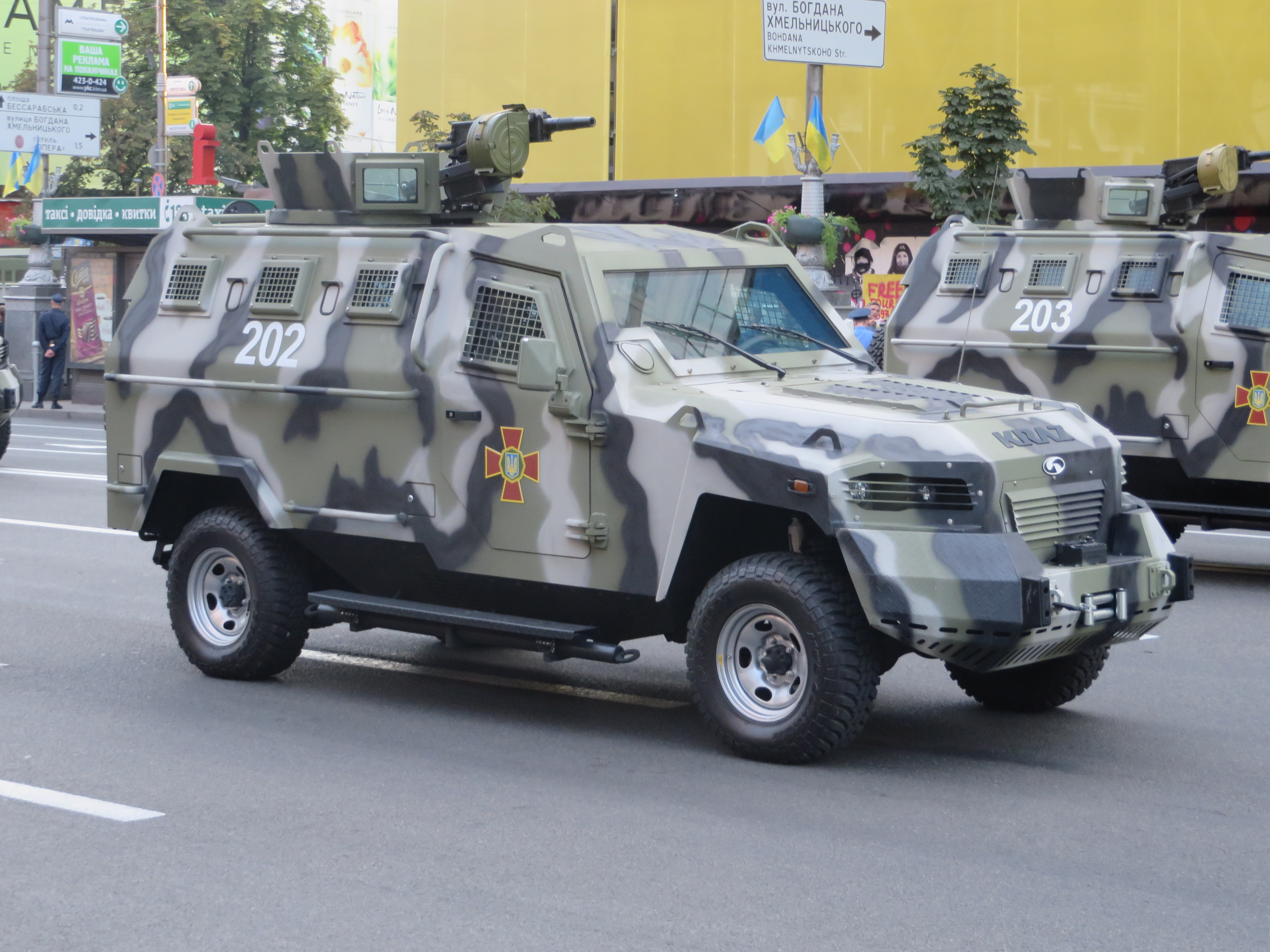
Cougar fitted with AGL

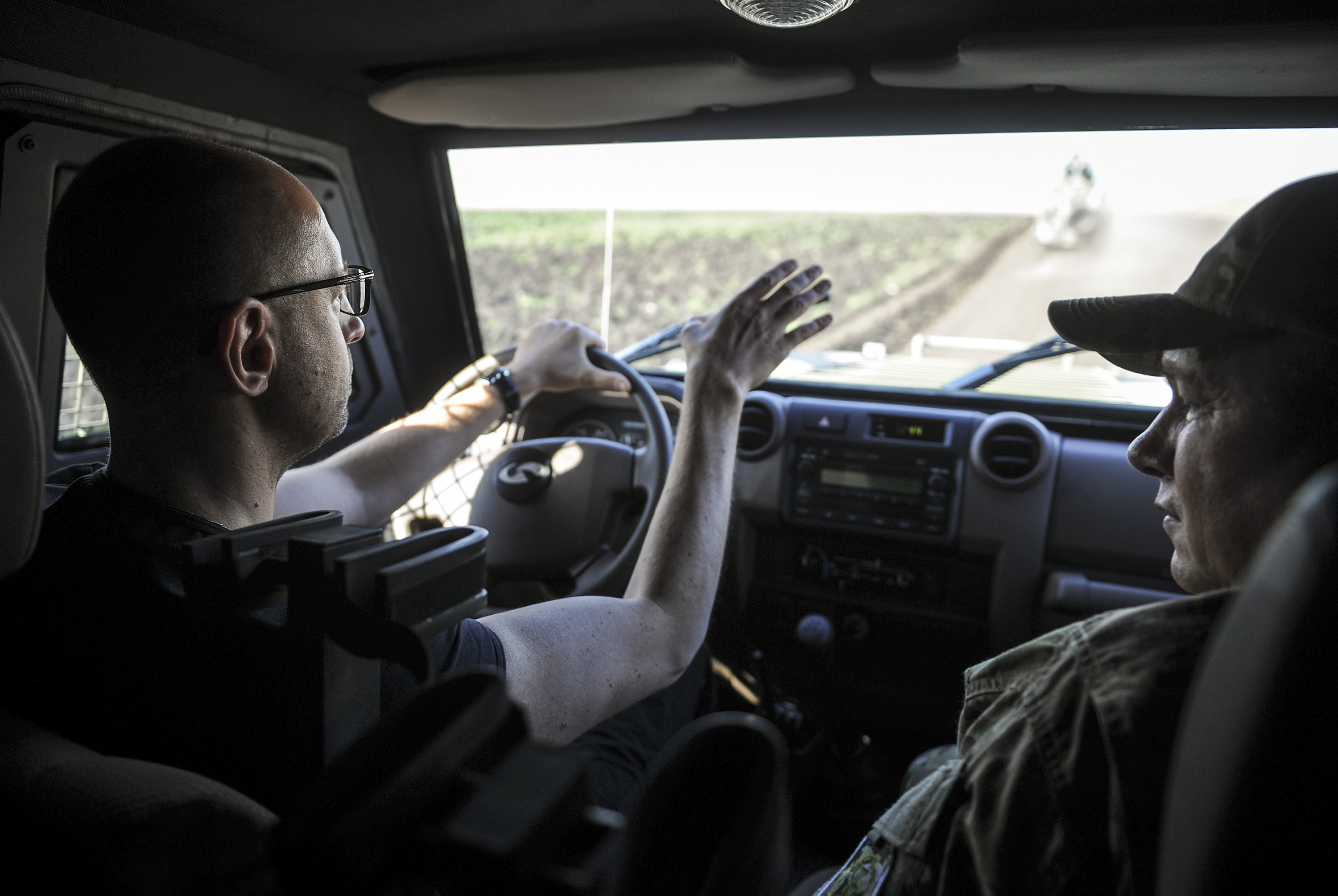
Cougar interior view

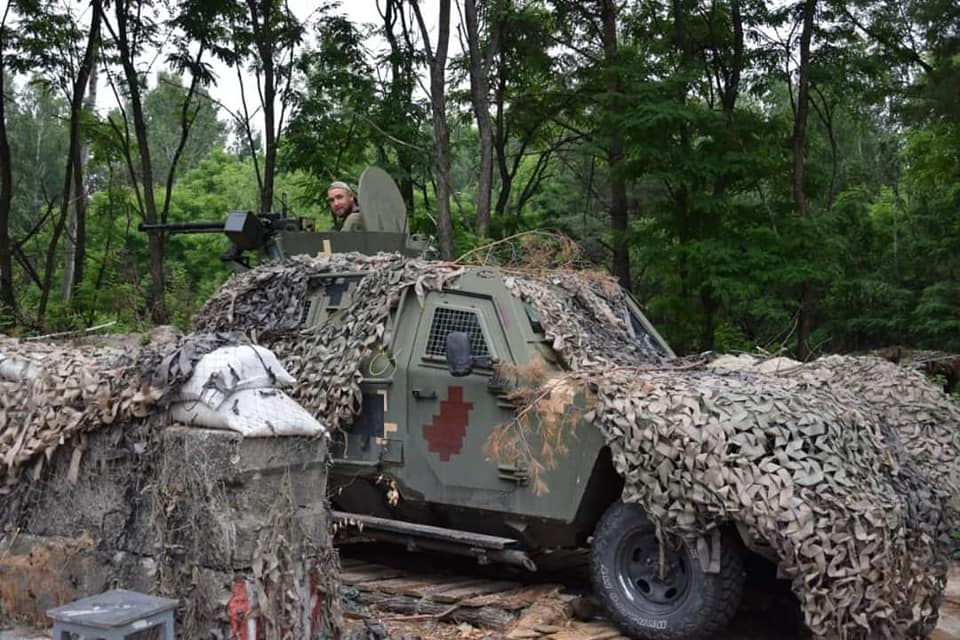
A KrAZ Cougar parked at a checkpoint in Eastern Ukraine

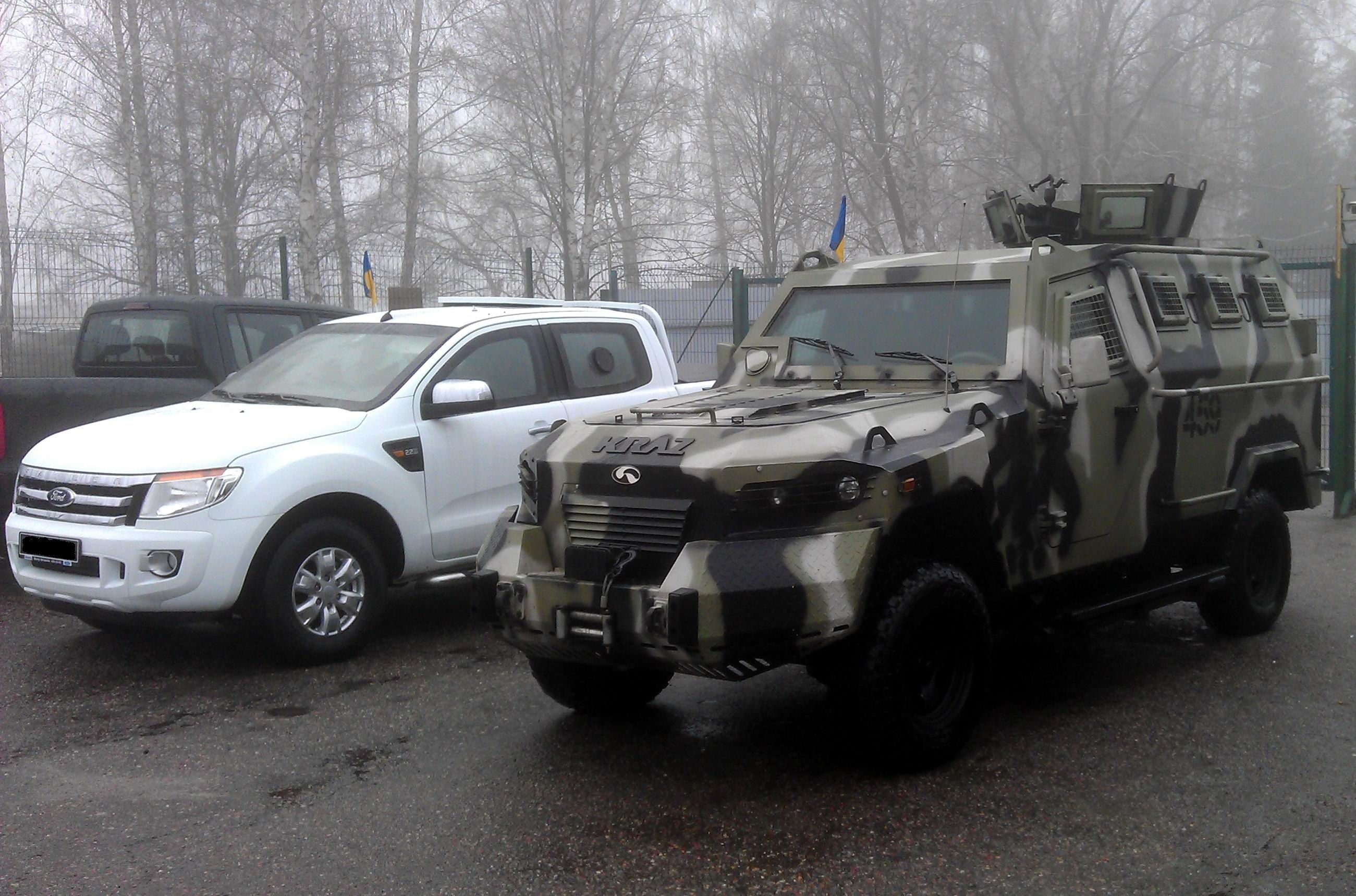
A KrAZ Cougar parked next to a Ford pickup truck

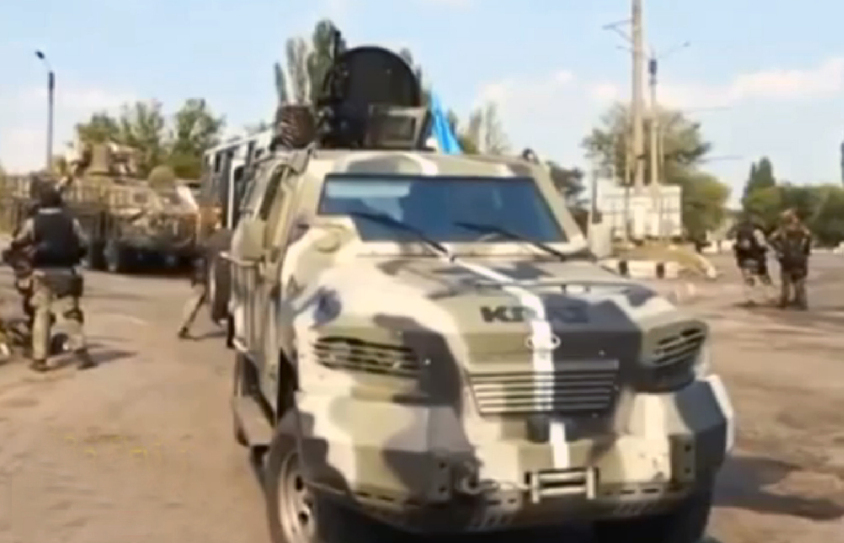
KrAZ Cougar front view

== See also ==
- KrAZ Cobra
