= Daka Fifo =

- Village
- Location in Mali
- Coordinates: 16°2′20″N 2°41′17″W
- Country: Mali
- Region: Tombouctou Region
- Cercle: Gourma-Rharous Cercle
- Commune: Haribomo
- Time zone: UTC+0 (GMT)

Daka Fifo is a village and seat of the commune of Haribomo in the Cercle of Gourma-Rharous in the Tombouctou Region of Mali.
