= Adiora =

- Village
- Location in Mali
- Coordinates: 16°5′38″N 1°15′25″W
- Country: Mali
- Region: Tombouctou Region
- Cercle: Gourma-Rharous Cercle
- Commune: Ouinerden
- Time zone: UTC+0 (GMT)

Adiora is a small village and seat of the commune of Ouinerden in the Cercle of Gourma-Rharous in the Tombouctou Region of Mali.
