= Kazay-Kazay ambush =

2016 battle of the Mali War

- Part of Mali War
Date	November 20, 2016
Location	Kazay-Kazay, near Douentza, Mali
Result	Jihadist victory

Belligerents
Mali	Ansar Dine

Casualties and losses
5 killed 8 injured	None

On November 20, 2016, militants from Ansar Dine ambushed Malian soldiers near Douentza.

== Background ==
Ansar Dine is one of several jihadist groups that has been at war with the Malian government since 2012. Around the time of the ambush, Malian elections were being held for the first time in years, and jihadist groups like Ansar Dine conducted attacks on Malian and French soldiers to intimidate civilians within their areas of influence.

== Ambush ==
The ambush occurred on the day of the municipal elections in Mali. At the time of the attack, Malian soldiers from the Bambara Maoudé commune were sent to villages near Douentza Cercle to secure voting booths and ensure participation, and afterwards transport the ballots from the villages to Inadjatafane, the capital of the commune. The attackers are suspected to be from southern Gao Region where Ansar Dine is active, commanded by El Mansour.

Malian security sources stated five Malian soldiers, including Captain Moussa Siaka Kone, were killed, and eight others were injured.
