= Hanzakoma =

- Commune
- Location in Mali
- Coordinates: 16°45′25″N 2°26′42″W
- Country: Mali
- Region: Tombouctou Region
- Cercle: Gourma-Rharous Cercle

Area
  - Total: 4,500 km^{2} (1,700 sq mi)

Population (2009 census)
  - Total: 7,929
  - Density: 1.8/km^{2} (4.6/sq mi)
- Time zone: UTC+0 (GMT)

Hanzakoma or Hamzakoma is a rural commune of the Cercle of Gourma-Rharous in the Tombouctou Region of Mali. The commune contains 19 villages and in the 2009 census had a population of 7,929. The principal village (chef-lieu) is Minkiri.
