= Inadiatafane =

- Commune and village
- Location in Mali
- Coordinates: 15°38′42″N 2°9′11″W
- Country: Mali
- Region: Tombouctou Region
- Cercle: Gourma-Rharous Cercle

Population (2009 census)
  - Total: 3,557
- Time zone: UTC+0 (GMT)

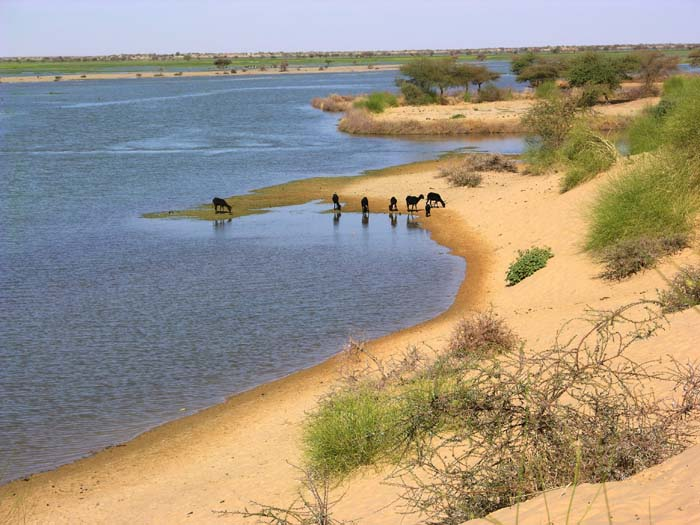
Gourma-Rharous in the Tombouctou Region, Mali

Inadiatafane is a village and commune of the Cercle of Gourma-Rharous in the Tombouctou Region of Mali. The commune contains 25 villages and in the 2009 census had a population of 3,557.
