= Ouinerden =

Ouinderden
- Commune
- Location in Mali
- Coordinates: 16°5′38″N 1°15′25″W
- Country: Mali
- Region: Tombouctou Region
- Cercle: Gourma-Rharous Cercle

Area
  - Total: 8,090 km^{2} (3,120 sq mi)
- Elevation: 272 m (892 ft)

Population (2009 census)
  - Total: 6,105
- Time zone: UTC+0 (GMT)

Ouinderden is a rural commune of the Cercle of Gourma-Rharous in the Tombouctou Region of Mali. The seat lies at Adiora. The commune contains 28 small villages and in the 2009 census had a population of 6,105, nearly all of whom are nomadic pastoralists.
