= Military ranks of Mali =

The Military ranks of Mali (French: Grades militaires du Mali) are the military insignia used by the Malian Armed Forces. Mali is a landlocked country, and does therefore not possess a navy. Being a former colony of France, Mali shares a rank structure similar to that of France.

== Commissioned officer ranks ==
The rank insignia of commissioned officers.

Rank group	General / flag officers				Senior officers				Junior officers
Malian Army
Malian Army	Général d'armée	Général de corps d'armée	Général de division	Général de brigade	Colonel-major	Colonel	Lieutenant-colonel	Commandant	Capitaine	Lieutenant	Sous-lieutenant
Malian Air Force
Malian Air Force	Général d'armée	Général de corps d'armée	Général de division	Général de brigade	Colonel-major	Colonel	Lieutenant-colonel	Commandant	Capitaine	Lieutenant	Sous-lieutenant
National Guard of Mali
National Guard of Mali	Général d'armée	Général de corps d'armée	Général de division	Général de brigade	Colonel-major	Colonel	Lieutenant-colonel	Commandant	Capitaine	Lieutenant	Sous-lieutenant
Service de Sante
Service de Sante	Général d'armée	Général de corps d'armée	Général de division	Général de brigade	Colonel-major	Colonel	Lieutenant-colonel	Commandant	Capitaine	Lieutenant	Sous-lieutenant
Rank group	General / flag officers				Senior officers				Junior officers

=== Student officer ranks ===
Rank group	Student officer
Malian Army
Malian Army	Aspirant
Malian Air Force
Malian Air Force	Aspirant
National Guard of Mali
National Guard of Mali	Aspirant
Service de Sante
Service de Sante	Aspirant

== Other ranks ==
The rank insignia of non-commissioned officers and enlisted personnel.

Rank group	Senior NCOs					Junior NCOs		Enlisted
Malian Army
Malian Army	Major	Adjudant-chef	Adjudant	Sergent-chef	Sergent	Caporal-chef	Caporal	Soldat de première classe	Soldat
Malian Air Force
Malian Air Force	Major	Adjudant-chef	Adjudant	Sergent-chef	Sergent	Caporal-chef	Caporal	Soldat de première classe	Soldat
National Guard of Mali
National Guard of Mali	Major	Adjudant-chef	Adjudant	Sergent-chef	Sergent	Caporal-chef	Caporal	Garde de première classe	Garde
Service de Sante
Service de Sante	Major	Adjudant-chef	Adjudant	Sergent-chef	Sergent	Caporal-chef	Caporal	Soldat de première classe	Soldat
Rank group	Senior NCOs					Junior NCOs		Enlisted
