= Sékou Ly =

Interior Minister of Mali
- In office 1991 – March 28, 1991
- Preceded by: Sory Ibrahima Sylla
- Succeeded by: Tiecoura Doumbia

Personal details
- Born: 1933 Segou or Bougouni, French Sudan (now Mali)
- Died: January 28, 2012 (aged 78–79) Bamako, Mali
- Party: CMLN

Military service
- Allegiance: French Army (1953–1960); Mali (1960–1991)
- Branch/service: Malian Armed Forces
- Rank: Major General

Sékou Ly was a Malian soldier and minister and a participant in the 1968 Malian coup d'état, as well as a close confidant of Moussa Traoré.

== Biography ==
Ly was born in Ségou or Bougouni in 1933. He joined the French Army as a volunteer in 1953. Ly studied at the Strasbourg Military Academy in Strasbourg from 1960 to 1961 before joining the army of the newly independent Mali. He served as a military instructor at the Kati Military Academy and then as commander of the army's automobile group.

After assisting in the 1968 Malian coup d'état, Ly entered Moussa Traoré's inner circle. He served as an infantry squad commander and city manager in Nioro du Sahel from 1969 to 1970, and then as mayor of Bamako from 1970 to 1977. Ly sided with Traore during the 1978 coup attempt, and was appointed secretary of state, where he served for twelve years. Between 1978 and 1991, Ly served Minister of the Interior, Minister of Defense, and Minister of Education. He was promoted to major-general in 1988.

Traore appointed Ly to Interior Minister in 1991 to suppress growing anti-government protests. He met with representatives of the Malian Democratic Movement but failed to find common ground. Ly was captured by Amadou Toumani Touré's forces during the 1991 Malian coup d'état. He was put trial in 1992 and 1993 alongside Traore, Defense Minister Mamadou Coulibaly, and chief of staff Ousmane Couliby. Ly was sentenced to death in 1993 for the killing of 300 unarmed protesters in 1991, but this was commuted to life imprisonment in 1997. He was put on trial again in 2000 for misuse of public funds. In 2002, President Alpha Oumar Konaré pardoned him.

In his later years, Ly devoted his time to raising pigeons. He died on January 28, 2012, in Bamako, and his funeral was attended by Traore, Toure, Prime Minister Cissé Mariam Kaïdama Sidibé, and other dignitaries.
