= Haribomo =

- Commune
- Location in Mali
- Coordinates: 16°4′30″N 2°40′16″W
- Country: Mali
- Region: Tombouctou Region
- Cercle: Gourma-Rharous Cercle

Area
  - Total: 3,500 km^{2} (1,400 sq mi)

Population (2009 census)
  - Total: 7,389
  - Density: 2.1/km^{2} (5.5/sq mi)
- Time zone: UTC+0 (GMT)

Haribomo is a rural commune of the Cercle of Gourma-Rharous in the Tombouctou Region of Mali. The commune contains 29 villages and in the 2009 census had a population of 7,389. The principal village (chef-lieu) is Daka Fifo.
