= Séréré, Mali =

Séréré
- Commune
- Location in Mali
- Coordinates: 16°45′4″N 2°21′54″W
- Country: Mali
- Region: Tombouctou Region
- Cercle: Gourma-Rharous Cercle
- Admin HQ (chef-lieu): Madiakoye

Area
  - Total: 296 km^{2} (114 sq mi)
- Elevation: 260 m (850 ft)

Population (2009 census)
  - Total: 9,463
  - Density: 32.0/km^{2} (82.8/sq mi)
- Time zone: UTC+0 (GMT)

Séréré is a rural commune of the Cercle of Gourma-Rharous in the Tombouctou Region of Mali. The administrative center (chef-lieu) is the village of Madiakoye.
