= Bambara Maoudé =

- Commune and village
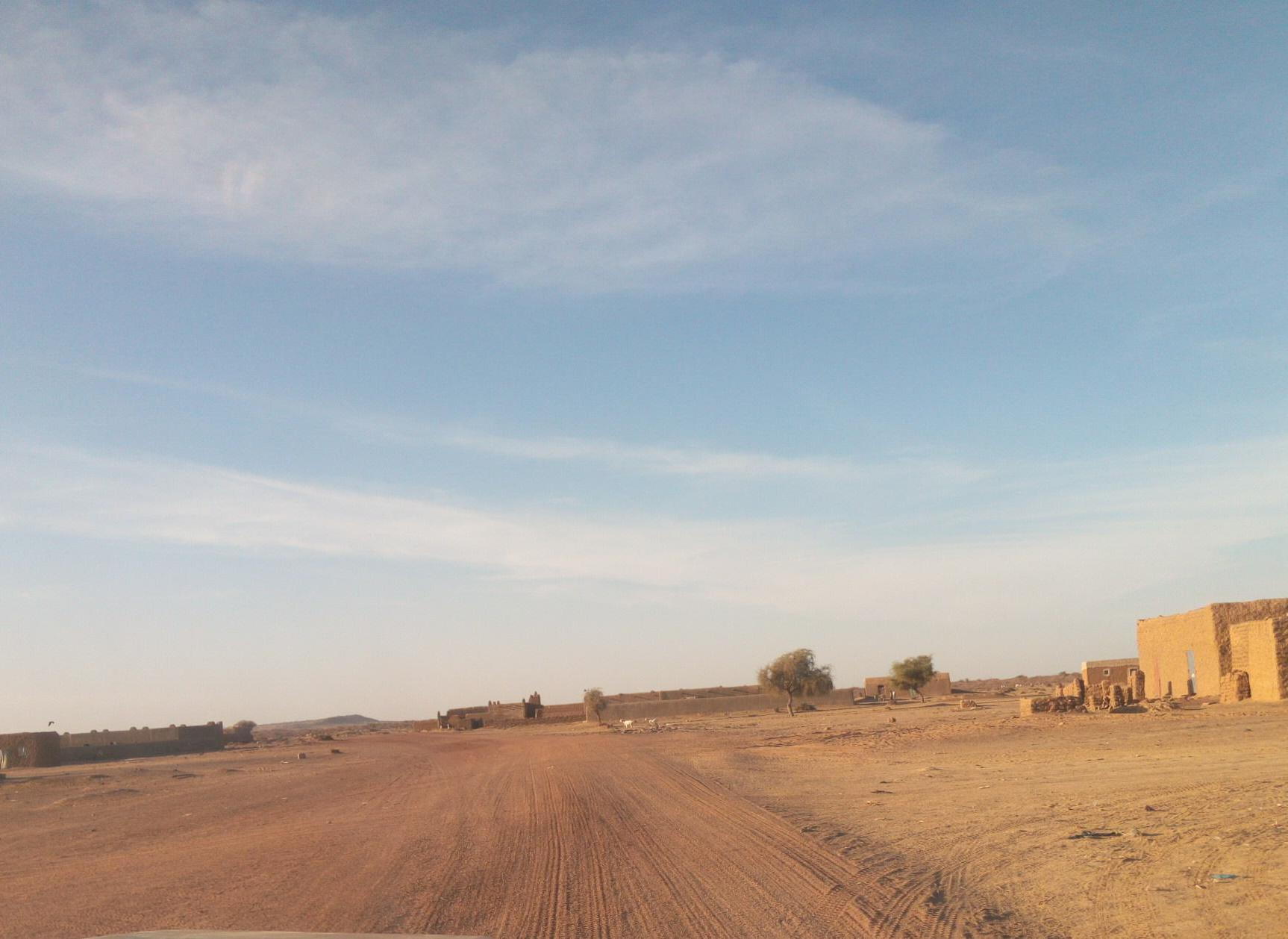
- View from an unpaved road in Bambara Maoudé

- Location in Mali
- Coordinates: 15°51′7″N 2°47′10″W
- Country: Mali
- Region: Tombouctou Region
- Cercle: Gourma-Rharous Cercle

Area
  - Total: 1,370 km^{2} (530 sq mi)
- Elevation: 261 m (856 ft)

Population (2009 census)
  - Total: 16,864
  - Density: 12.3/km^{2} (31.9/sq mi)
- Time zone: UTC+0 (GMT)

Bambara Maoudé or Bambara Maoundé is a village and rural commune of the Cercle of Gourma-Rharous in the Tombouctou Region of Mali. The commune contains 44 villages and had a population of 16,874 in the 2009 census.

The commune includes Lake Banzena (15°40′00″N 2°35′30″W) which serves as an important source of water for the Gourma elephants at the end of the dry season (April to June). The intense competition between elephants and cattle at the lake led to the death of 21 elephants in 2010. As a result, the World Bank is coordinating efforts to provide alternative sources of water for the cattle so that the elephants can have exclusive access to the lake.
