= Banikane, Gourma-Rharous =

Banikane
- Commune and village
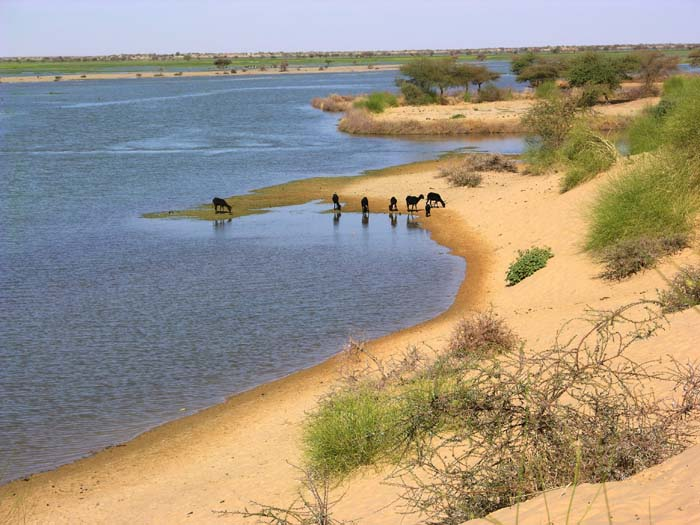
- Gourma-Rharous in the Tombouctou Region, Mali

- Location in Mali
- Coordinates: 16°56′58″N 1°44′53″W
- Country: Mali
- Region: Tombouctou Region
- Cercle: Gourma-Rharous Cercle

Population (2009 census)
  - Total: 9,433
- Time zone: UTC+0 (GMT)

Banikane is a village and commune of the Cercle of Gourma-Rharous in the Tombouctou Region of Mali. The village lies on the right bank of the River Niger, 25 km downstream of Rharous. The commune extends on both banks of the river and includes 15 villages. In the 2009 census the population of the commune was 9,433.
