= STREIT Group =

UAE based armoured vehicle manufacturer

STREIT Group is an armoured vehicle manufacturer, based in Ras Al Khaimah, United Arab Emirates. As of 2019, Streit maintains "12 state-of-the-art production facilities and 25 offices worldwide", employing "a workforce of more than 2,000 people".

Streit produces armored personnel carriers, cash-in-transit, luxury, and security vehicles which are designed to provide effective protection in high-risk situations. Streit's vehicles undergo STANAG 3 certification for military tactical vehicles and VPAM BRV 2009 VR7 for luxury and special purpose vehicles.

== History ==
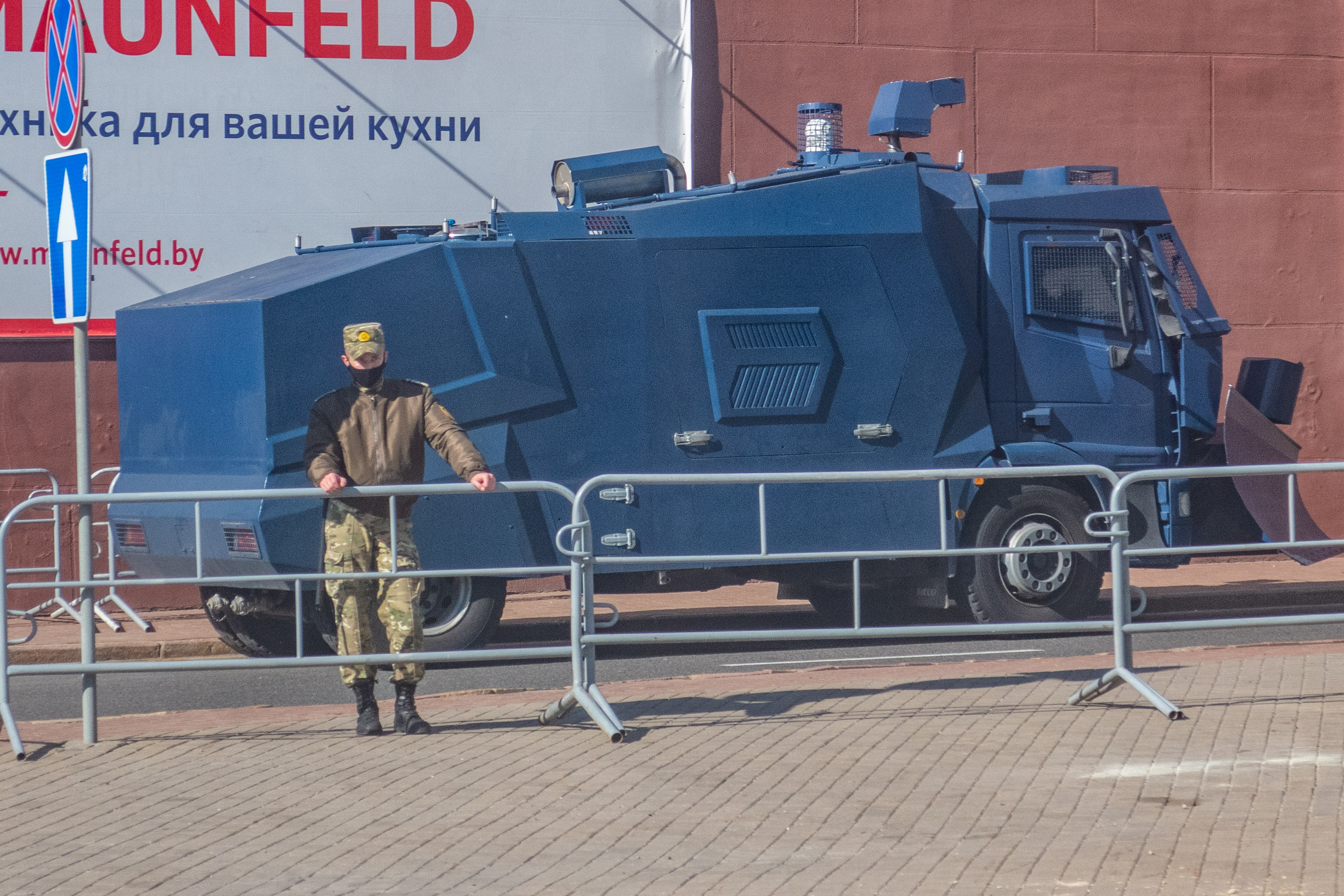
Predator in Minsk, Belarus

The group was founded in 1992 by Guerman Goutorov. He started by importing armored cash transit vehicles from the US to Russia.

In September 2015, STREIT USA was fined $3.5m for illegal export of armored vehicles to Afghanistan, Iraq, Nigeria and some other countries without required licenses from the United States Commerce Department. In a newspaper report published in 2016, the RCMP said that it was investigating the Canadian subsidiary over possible sanctions violations in the Sudan, in its sale of 30 Typhoon armoured trucks.

In July 2019, STREIT vehicles are seen in the Sudan, and Canadian activists were concerned about their use in the War in Darfur. In Eurosatory 2022, STREIT announced that a manufacturing facility is being set up in Uganda.

In August 2026, STREIT was sanctioned by the Government of Canada for providing armoured vehicles to the Rosgvardia for use in the Russo-Ukraine war.

== Leadership ==
In July 2019, "Canadian businessman" Guerman Goutorov was identified as the company's CEO.

== Oversight ==
=== Involvement in Sudan ===
The UN Arms Trade Treaty, signed by Canada in 2019, prohibits the export of arms to Sudan directly or through third countries. Streit has claimed that the exports do not violate controls because they do not have weapons attached to them. The United Nations has condemned Streit’s involvement with Sudan several times over the years.

RSF soldiers were seen posting on social media in armored vehicles manufactured by the company.

=== Vehicles ===
==== Streit design ====
- STREIT Group Cougar based on Toyota Land Cruiser 79 chassis
- STREIT Group Spartan based on the Ford F-550 chassis
- STREIT Group Typhoon, 4x4 or 6x6 MRAP

==== KrAZ built armoured vehicles ====
The following armoured vehicles are either built under license or are built with Streit assistance:

- KrAZ Spartan (Спартан) - 4×4, based on Ford F550
- KrAZ Cougar (Кугар)[21] - 4×4, based on Toyota Land Cruiser 79
- KrAZ-ASV Panther (Пантер) - MRAP based on KrAZ-5233 or KrAZ-6322
- KrAZ-MPV Shrek One (Шрек) - MRAP based on KrAZ-5233
- KrAZ Feona (Фіона) - 6×6 MRAP based on KrAZ-6322
- KrAZ-6322 Raptor (Раптор) - 6×6
- KrAZ Hurricane (Ураган) - 8×8 MRAP based on KrAZ H27.3 (KrAZ-7634)
- KrAZ Convoy (Конвой) - 4×4/6×6/8×8 armored chassis cab/flatbed

== Global subsidiaries or licensees ==
- STREIT Manufacturing (Canada)
- STREIT Pakistan
- KrAZ (Ukraine)
- NEC–Streit Uganda Limited

== Sanctions ==
The STREIT group has been sanctioned for the supply of vehicles to Russia during the Russian invasion of Ukraine. It has been sanctioned by Ukraine, European Union, Switzerland and Canada.
