= STREIT Group Spartan =

Spartan
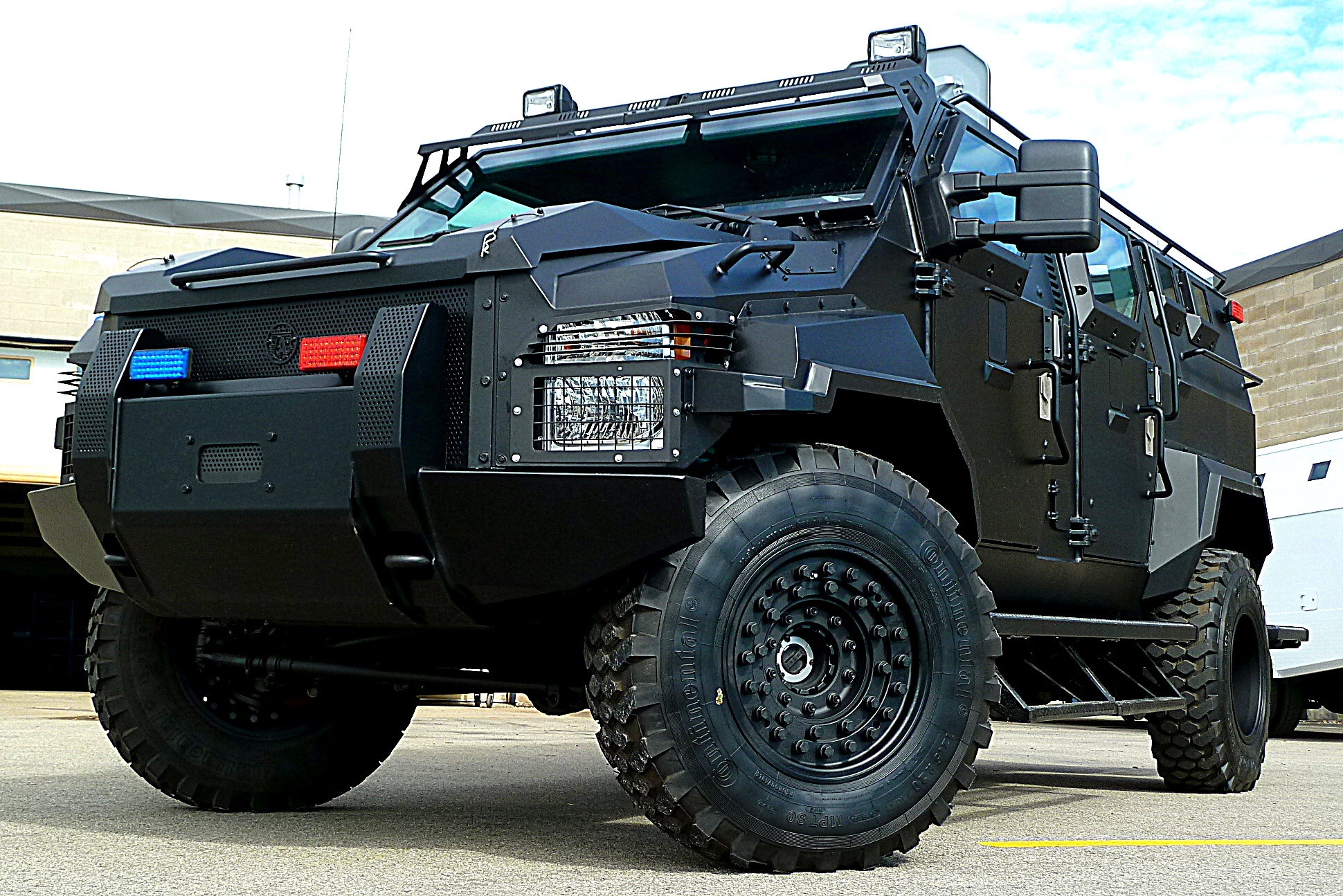
- A police Spartan at the manufacturing facility in Ontario, Canada
- Type: Infantry mobility vehicle with MRAP capabilities

Service history
- Used by: See Operators
- Wars: War in Iraq (2013-2017); War in Donbas; Russian invasion of Ukraine

Production history
- Manufacturer: STREIT Group; KrAZ

Specifications
- Length: 6.020 m (19 ft 9.0 in)
- Width: 2.438 m (8 ft 0 in)
- Height: 2.378 m (7 ft 9.6 in)
- Crew: 2
- Passengers: 6
- Main armament: Optional turret
- Engine: Ford 6.7L Scorpion Turbo Diesel V8; 400 hp (300 kW) at 2,800 rpm
- Payload capacity: 1,100 kg (2,400 lb)
- Transmission: Automatic, electronically controlled Four-wheel drive
- Suspension: Reinforced
- Fuel capacity: 257 L (57 imp gal; 68 US gal)
- Maximum speed: 110 km/h (68 mph)

The STREIT Group Spartan is an infantry mobility vehicle designed and built by STREIT Group; it is also license produced by KrAZ (Kremenchuk Automobile Plant) in Kremenchuk, Ukraine.

The Spartan can be used in a wide variety of applications, including military and police missions. Its welded steel body is mounted on the chassis of a Ford F550. It is able to withstand ballistic assaults and protect against grenade and land mine blasts.

== Variants ==
=== KrAZ-Spartan ===
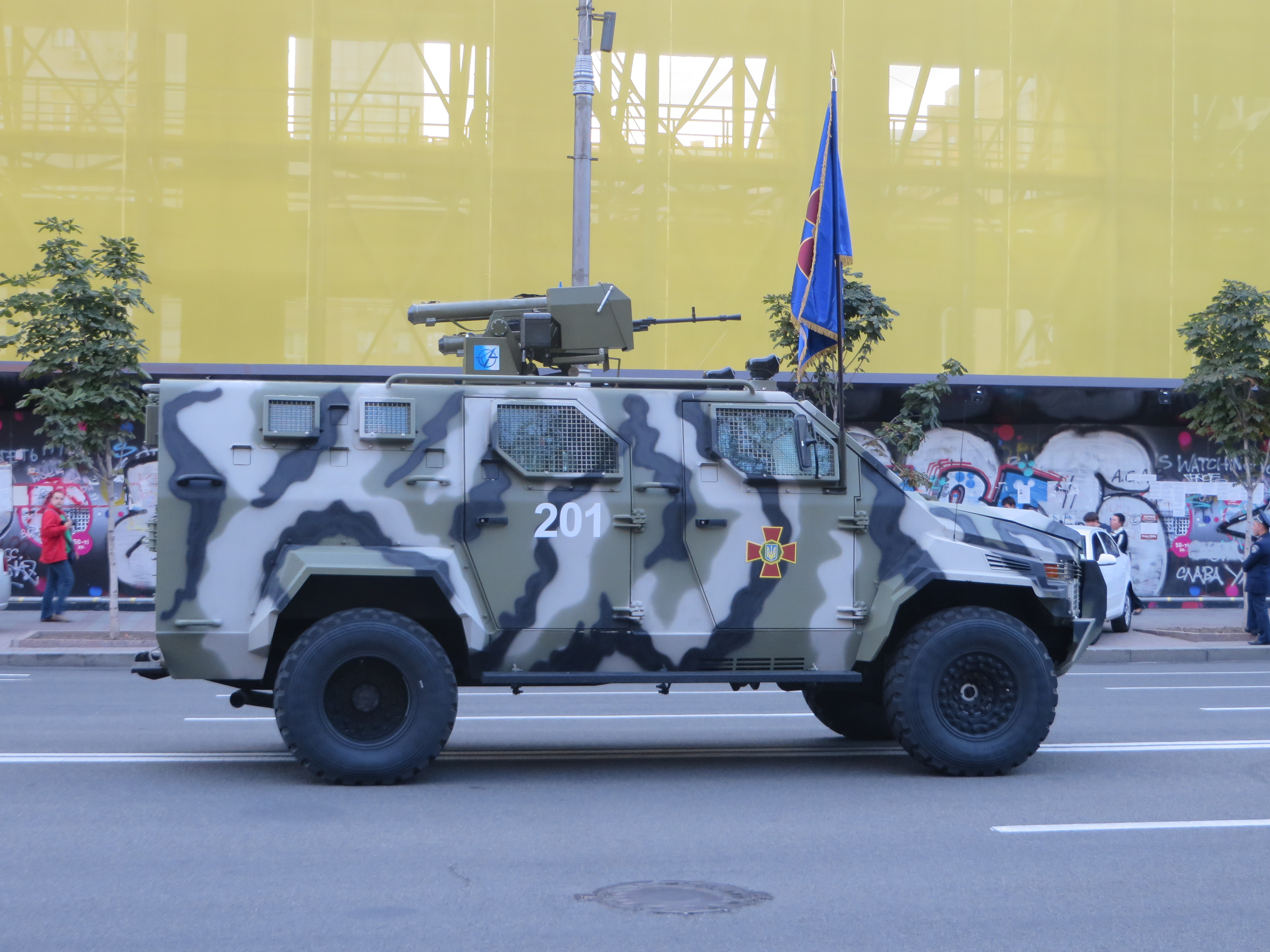
Ukrainian KrAZ Spartan with RK-3 Corsar ATGMs installed on RWS, during a practice for the parade dedicated to the 23rd Independence Day of Ukraine (Kyiv, Ukraine)

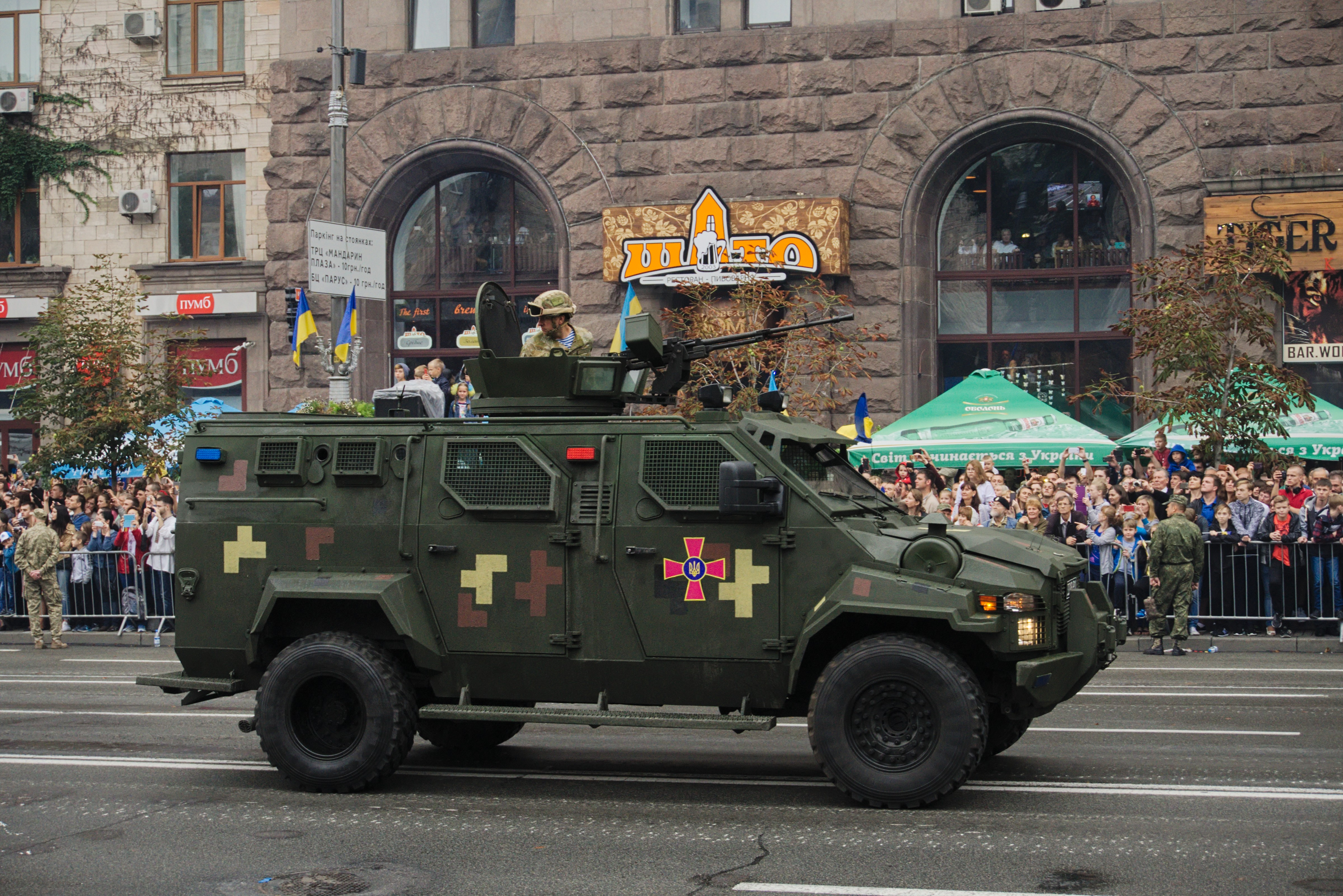
Ukrainian KrAZ Spartan without the RWS, during a practice for the parade dedicated to the 25th Independence Day of Ukraine (Kyiv, Ukraine)

The Ukrainian truck maker AutoKraz manufactures the Spartan under license and the vehicle was first delivered to the military in 2014. According to manufacture, KrAZ Spartan armored vehicle is used for carrying personnel in highly dangerous areas. Spartan is designed to resist ballistic threats from any angle. It offers CEN Level BR6 protection. The vehicle’s hull is designed to resist multiple 7.62×51mm NATO (flat nose, pointed bullet, lead soft core) assault rifle rounds from any angle. The bottom of the vehicle can withstand the blast of two DM51 high-explosive fragmentation hand grenades. Its roof hatch is designed to support a pivoting turret with or without a machine gun. A remote controlled weapon station (RWS) is also installable as per customer requirement that combines a machine gun and a quartet of RK-3 Corsar anti-tank missiles.
Specifications:

- Configuration: 4х4
- Truck gross weight: 8,800 kg
- Engine: 6.7L diesel
- Power: 300 hp
- Max speed: 110 km/h
- Gear box: automatic, 6-speed
- Seating capacity: 2 crew members + 6 troops
- Tyres: 335/70R20; 335/80R20 (RunFlat)

=== KrAZ-Spartan Self-Driving Armoured Vehicle ===
KrAZ-Spartam Self-Driving Armoured Vehicle is unmanned ground vehicle (UGV) version of KrAZ-Spartan. It was unveiled during the 2016 Arms and Security exhibition in Kyiv. The vehicle could be operated by a tablet, a smart glove or an operator control station. It uses WiFi / Wimax wireless networks to communicate with a range from 10 km to 50 km. It can transport ammunition, food, fuel and medicines to the combat zone. It also has ability to carry wounded troops to hospitals.

== Operators ==
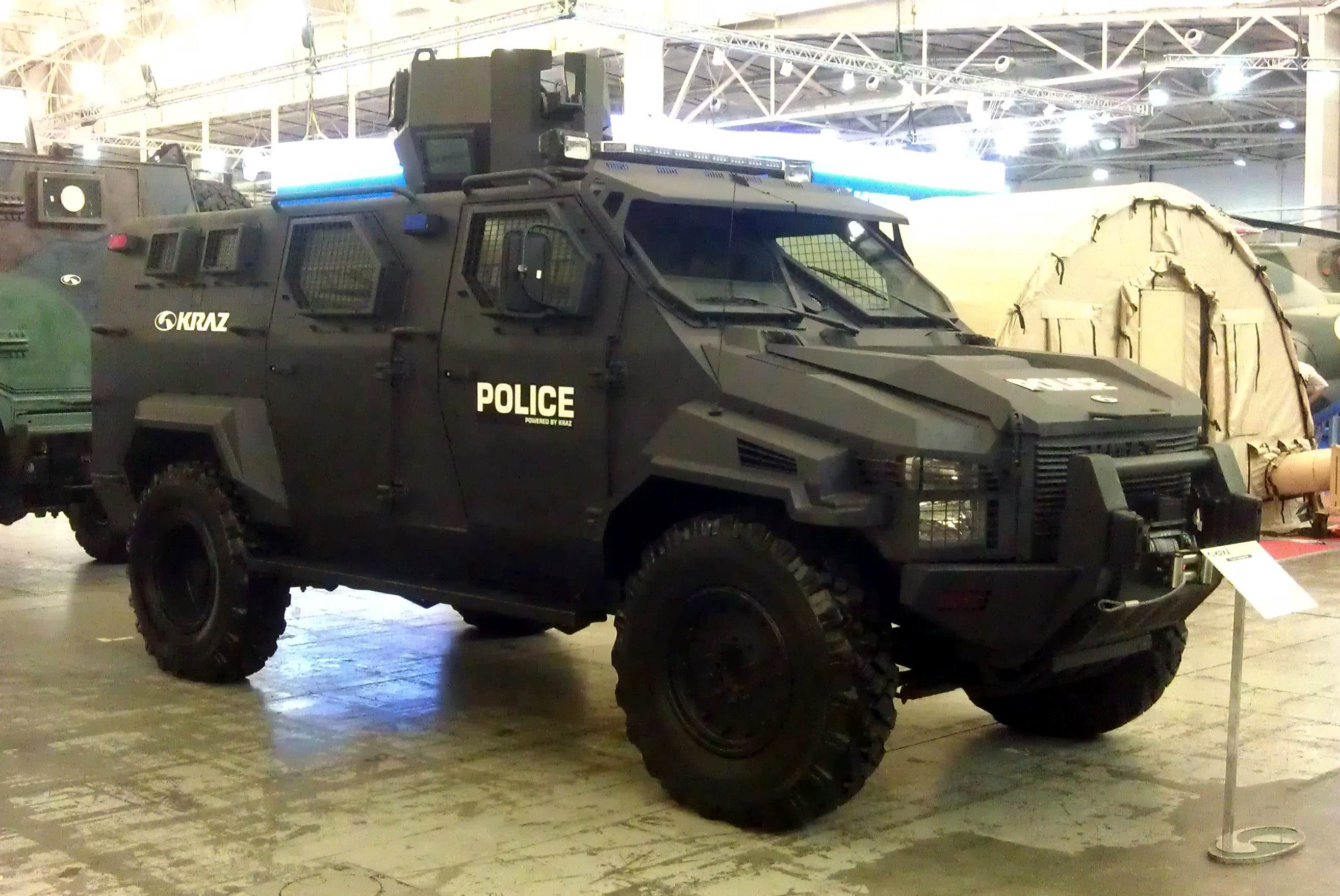
KrAZ Spartan police tactical vehicle without the remote controlled weapon station (RWS)

- Argentina
  - Argentine National Gendarmerie
- Bangladesh
  - Bangladesh Police
  - Border Guard Bangladesh
- Kurdistan
  - Peshmerga Locally Manufactured.
- Libya
  - Tripoli Protection Force - Approximately 79 Spartan vehicles delivered by 2014.
- Nigeria
- Sudan
- Ukraine
  - Armed Forces of Ukraine – 30 KrAZ Spartans were given to Ukrainian Ground Forces in 2014.
  - National Guard of Ukraine – In early August 2014, the Ministry of the Interior of Ukraine ordered 21 KrAZ Spartans for the National Guard of Ukraine. After the military parade dedicated to the 23rd Independence Day of Ukraine (August 24, 2014), they were sent into combat in Eastern Ukraine.
