= Gourma-Rharous Cercle =

- Cercle
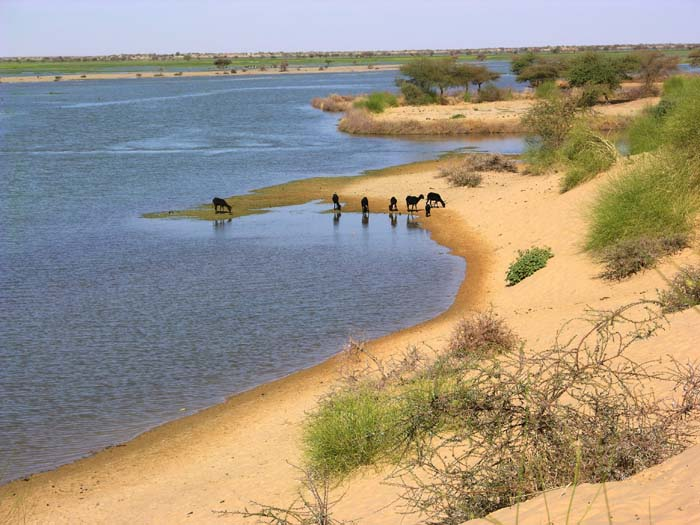

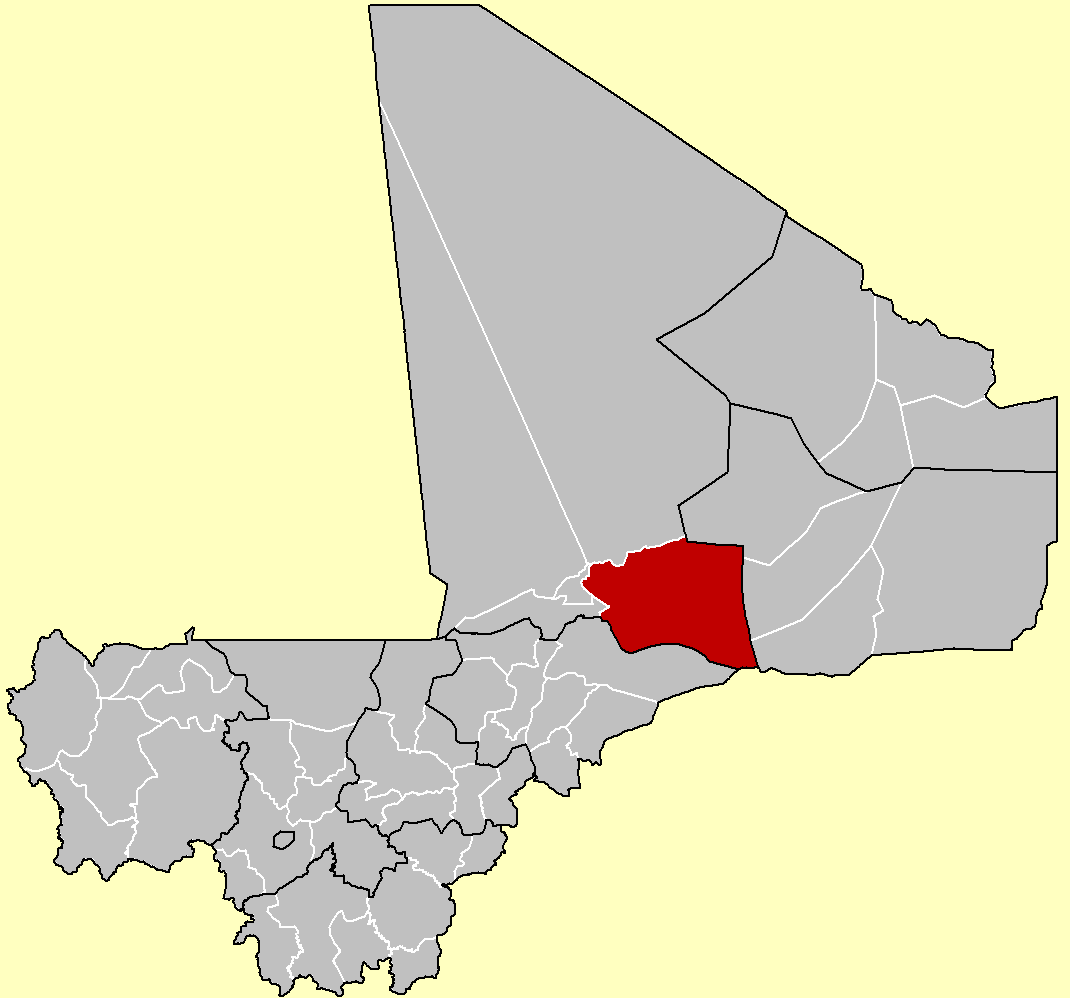
- Location of the Cercle of Gourma-Rharous in Mali
- Country: Mali
- Region: Tombouctou Region
- Admin HQ (Chef-lieu): Gourma-Rharous

Area
  - Total: 45,000 km^{2} (17,000 sq mi)

Population (2009 census)
  - Total: 111,386
  - Density: 2.5/km^{2} (6.4/sq mi)
- Time zone: UTC+0 (GMT)

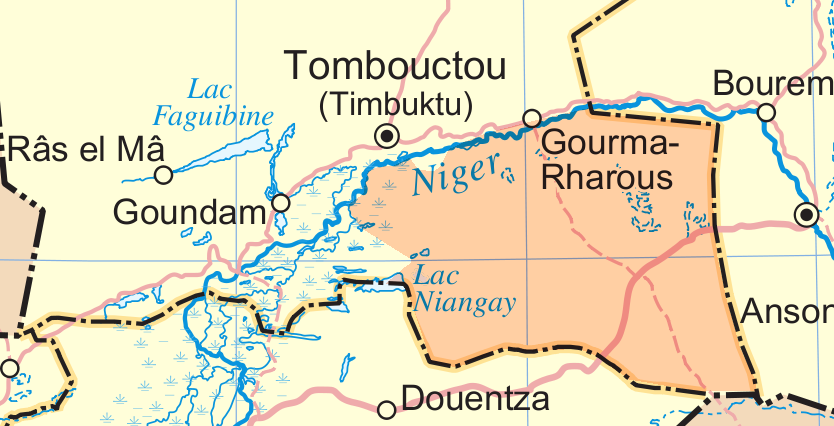
Gourma Rharous cercle

Gourma-Rharous Cercle is an administrative subdivision of the Tombouctou Region of Mali. The administrative center is the town of Gourma-Rharous.

The route of the annual circular migration of the Gourma elephants crosses a number of communes in the cercles of Gourma-Rharous and Douentza (Mopti Region). Lake Banzena (15°40′00″N 2°35′30″W) in the commune of Bambara Maoudé serves as an important source of water for the elephants at the end of the dry season (April to June).

The cercle is divided into nine communes:

- Bambara Maoudé
- Banikane
- Gossi
- Hamzakoma
- Haribomo
- Inadiatafane
- Ouinerden
- Rharous
- Séréré
