= Gourma-Rharous =

- Commune and town
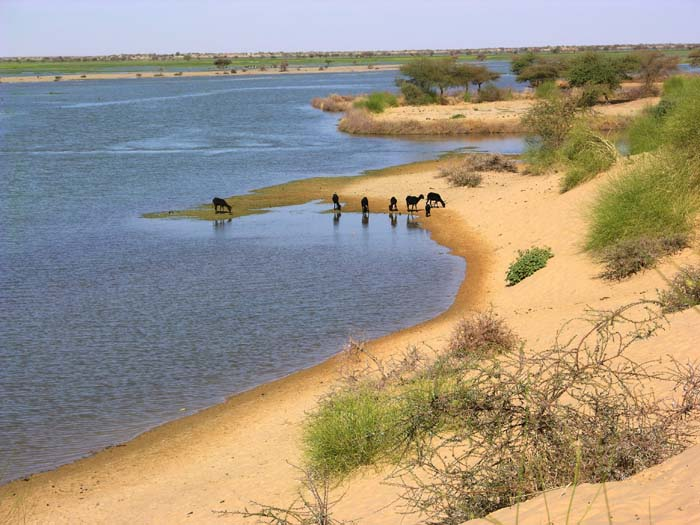
- The Niger River at Gourma Rharous

- Location in Mali
- Coordinates: 16.880°N 1.9238°W
- Country: Mali
- Region: Timbuktu
- Cercle: Gourma-Rharous Cercle

Area
  - Total: 7,000 km^{2} (2,700 sq mi)

Population (2009 Census)
  - Total: 26,115
  - Density: 3.7/km^{2} (9.7/sq mi)
- Time zone: UTC+0 (GMT)

Gourma-Rharous (French pronunciation: [ɡuʁma ʁaʁus]) or Rharous, is a rural commune and small town in the Timbuktu Region, Mali. The town is the administrative center (chef-lieu) of the Gourma-Rharous Cercle and lies on the right bank of the Niger River 110 km east of Timbuktu. The commune has an area of approximately 7,000 km^{2} and contains 29 villages. In the census of 2009 it had a population of 26,115.

== History ==
French singer Daniel Balavoine died in a helicopter crash in Gourma-Rharous as he was leading a fund-raising effort in Africa during the 1986 Dakar Rally. During the 2026 Mali offensives, the Azawad Liberation Front attacked the a military camp near the town.
