= 2021 in Mali =

- Decades: 2000s; 2010s; 2020s
- See also: History of Mali; List of years in Mali

Events in the year 2021 in Mali.

== Incumbents ==
- President: Bah Ndaw (interim)
- Prime Minister: Moctar Ouane (acting) (until 24 May), Choguel Kokalla Maïga (starting 6 June)
- National Committee for the Salvation of the People:
  - Chairman: Colonel Assimi Goïta
  - Spokesman: Colonel-Major Ismaël Wagué

== Events ==
Ongoing — COVID-19 pandemic in Mali and Mali War

=== January to March ===
- January 1 – Six people, including former prime minister Boubou Cissé are charged with an “attempted coup”.
- January 2 – Two French soldiers are killed in Ménaka Region. Al-Qaeda in the Islamic Maghreb claims responsibility.
- January 3 - Mali wedding airstrike: France says it neutralized dozens of jihadists in an airstrike but people in the town of Bounti in Mopti Region, say that twenty wedding guests were killed by a low-flying helicopter.
- January 13 – Three U.N. peacekeepers from the Ivory Coast are killed by an Improvised explosive device (IED) on the road between Douentza and Timbuktu. Six others soldiers were wounded.
- January 20 – Police use tear gas to disperse 1,000 protesters against the 5,100 French military forces in the county.
- January 24
  - Six soldiers are killed in two coordinated acts in Boulkessi and Mondoro, Mopti Region.
  - Fulani herdsmen and Dogon farmers sign a third humanitarian agreement to end fighting in Koro, Mopti Region.
- January 25 – U.S. Navy SEAL Tony DeDolph is sentenced to ten years of prison for murdering U.S. Army Green Beret Logan Melgar while serving in 2017 in Mali.
- January 31 – Three hundred British troops with 60 light vehicles join 14,000 United Nations peacekeepers under Chinese command. This is a different mission from the French mission that is supported by 90 British troops and three Chinook helicopters.
- February 10 – Twenty United Nations′ peace keepers are wounded in attacks by rebels in Douentza.
- February 25 – Nine soldiers are killed and nine wounded in an attack in Bandiagara, Mopti.
- March 30 – A United Nations investigation by the UN peacekeeping mission in Mali (MINUSMA) finds that a 3 January French military airstrike on the village of Bounty, hit a wedding group largely made up of civilians, leaving 22 people dead, including 19 civilians.

=== April to June ===
- April 1 – The remains of Béatrice Stöckli, a Swiss missionary in Timbuktu, have been identified. She was captured by kidnapped by jihadists in 2016.
- April 2 – Four Chadian soldiers are killed and many more are wounded when their base is attacked by jihadists in Aguelhok, Kidal.
- May 6 – The Permanent Strategic Framework for Peace, Security, and Development (CSP-PSD) is formed, as an alliance between the Coordination of Azawad Movements (CMA) and Platform of June 14, 2014 Algiers movements (Platform).
- May 6 – Halima Cissé, 25, gives birth to nine babies, which is probably a world record.
- May 21 – Interim President Bah Ndaw and Prime Minister Moctar Ouane are reported to have been arrested by the military and taken to a military base in Kati. This follows the detection of an increased military presence in Bamako.
- May 24 - Armed forces of Mali overthrows incumbent Mali President Bah N'daw from his office and strips multiple high ranking officials from their power.
- June 3 – The French Ministry of Armed Forces suspends combined operations between the French and Malian Armed Forces under Operation Barkhane following the second coup d'état in Mali within nine months.
- June 7 – Assimi Goïta is sworn-in as President of Mali after the recent coup d'état, which was considered a "coup within a coup" after Goïta, who directed the 2020 coup, carried out another coup and arrested the leaders that were in charge after the 2020 coup.
- June 25 – Fifteen German United Nations peacekeepers are injured in a car bomb attack at their base in Tarkint, Gao, Mali.

=== July to August ===
- July 4 – Four Malian soldiers are killed in an ambush on their patrol. No group claims responsibility for the attack, which comes as France resumes joint military exercises with members of the Malian Armed Forces, which had been suspended following the coup d'état this year led by Colonel Assimi Goïta.
- July 9 – Operation Barkhane: French President Emmanuel Macron announces that he will reduce the presence of troops in the Sahel to between 2,500 and 3,000 over the long-term, and will also close bases in Timbuktu, Tessalit and Kidal in northern Mali, as part of a reorganization effort to focus on missions in the Malian, Nigerien, and Burkinese border regions.
- July 17 –Three Chinese nationals and two Mauritanians are abducted at gunpoint from a construction site in Kwala, Mali.
- July 20 – A knifeman wounds Malian President Assimi Goïta in the arm at a mosque in Bamako. The perpetrator is arrested, and the attack is described as an assassination attempt.
- July 25 – The man who tried to kill Malian President Assimi Goïta with a knife at a mosque in Bamako six days ago dies in custody. The cause of death is unknown.
- August 8 – At least 51 people are killed as Islamist militants storm three villages in central Mali, near the border with Niger. It is one of the deadliest recent terror attacks in the country against civilians.
- August 19 – Jihadists ambush a convoy in Mopti, killing 11 soldiers and wounding 10 others. A roadside bomb hit the convoy, and gunmen then opened fire.
- August 26 – Former Prime Minister of Mali Soumeylou Boubèye Maïga is arrested accused of corruption for his involvement in the purchase of a presidential plane in 2014.
- August 27 – Former Mali leaders Bah Ndaw and Moctar Ouane are released from house arrest by the junta who removed them from power in May.

=== September to October ===
- September 5 – Members of Mali's police Special Anti-Terrorist Forces (Forsat) stormed a prison to liberate detained commander Oumar Samake.
- September 12 –Five Malian soldiers are killed in an ambush by "an as yet unidentified armed terrorist group" in the Macina Cercle of the Ségou Region, according to the army.
- September 14 – France says that a planned deal between Mali's military junta led by Assimi Goïta and the Wagner Group to bring Russian private military contractors into Mali was "incompatible" with the current French military presence.
- September 24 – A French serviceman, Maxime Blasco, is killed in a shootout with jihadists in a forest near Mali's border with Burkina Faso. The gunman who shot Blasco was also killed during the clash, according to the Ministry of Armed Forces.
- September 25 – Mali recruits Russia's PMC Wagner Group to fight Islamic terrorism in the country, according to a news outlet citing Russian foreign minister Sergey Lavrov.
- September 28 – Mali accuses France of "abandoning the country" by reducing its forces in the fight against jihadist groups. In response to the remarks, France accuses Mali's military junta of "wiping their feet on the blood of French soldiers".
- September 29 – Five Malian gendarmes are killed and four others are wounded in an ambush on a convoy escorting mining equipment to the Australian-owned Morila Gold Mine in Sikasso Region. Jihadist group Jama'at Nasr al-Islam wal Muslimin claims responsibility for the attack.
- October 2 – A United Nations peacekeeper is killed and three others are seriously injured when an IED detonates near where they were patrolling in the volatile north of the country, near the border with Algeria.
- October 6 – A battle between jihadists and Malian forces in the central Mopti Region leaves at least nine soldiers and 15 insurgents dead. The mayor of the nearby town of Bankass says that up to 16 soldiers were killed in the attack.
- October 9 – A Colombian Roman Catholic nun who had been kidnapped in Mali near the border with Burkina Faso in 2017 by the Macina Liberation Front is freed. The nun is photographed with Malian President Assimi Goïta as the government refuses to state if any ransom was paid for her release.
- October 19 – Defence minister Sadio Camara asks Mali's main Islamic body, the High Islamic Council, to mediate peace talks between the government and the local branch of al-Qaeda, Jama'at Nasr al-Islam wal Muslimin. The move is strongly opposed by France.
- October 25 – The Malian interim government gives the country's ECOWAS representative 72 hours to leave Mali over "actions incompatible with his status", though the government added that they still maintain a "willingness to work together with ECOWAS in the transition".
- October 29 – Two employees of the Canadian mining company Iamgold are reported missing following an attack on their convoy in Burkina Faso while travelling to Essakane.
- October 30 – Seven soldiers are killed in two separate attacks on patrols in Mourdiah.
- November 11 – Malian Foreign Affairs minister Abdoulaye Diop says that Mali "may ask Russia for help" due to the country's security situation, with Diop also saying that "the very existence of the Malian state is under threat".
- December 3 – Mopti bus massacre: Militants attack a bus carrying civilians in Mopti Region, killing the driver, before setting it on fire and killing 31 passengers. The majority of the victims are women who were on their way to work at the local market.
- December 5 – Militants bomb two UN camps in Gao, with no fatalities.
- December 30 – Jihadists ambush an army patrol near the town of Nara in Koulikoro Region, Mali, killing four soldiers and injuring more than a dozen others.

== Deaths ==
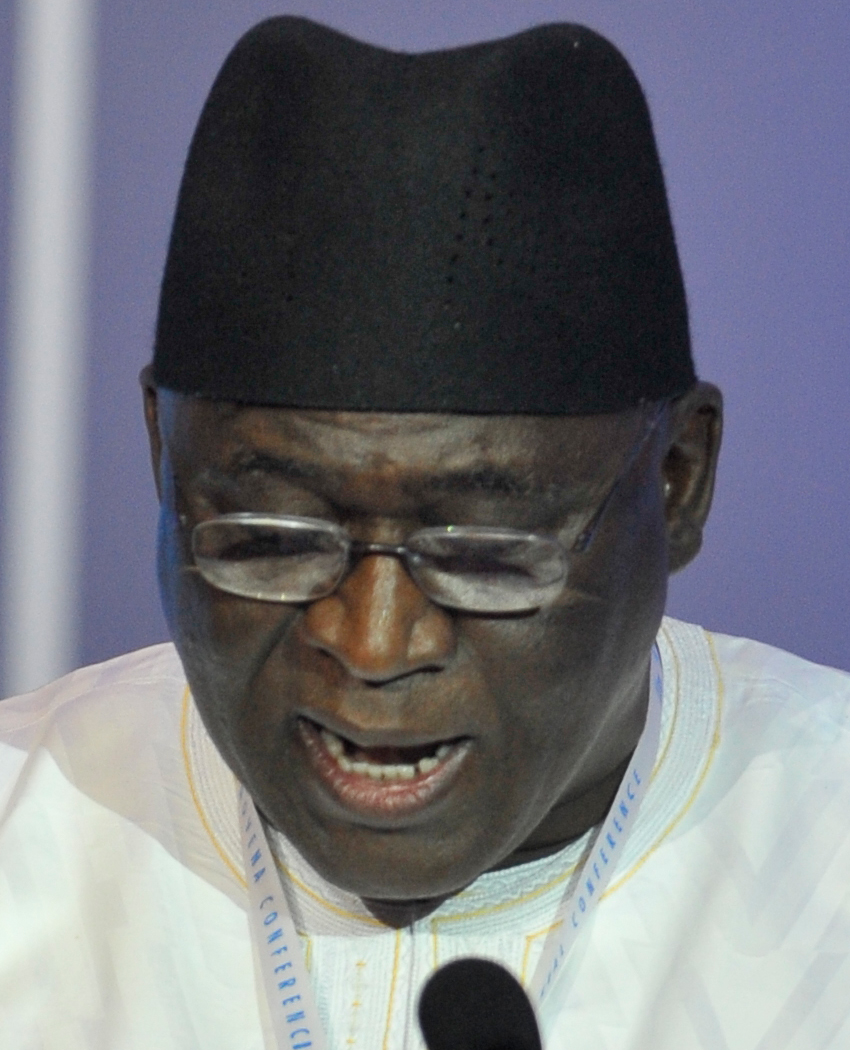
Modibo Keita

- 2 January – Modibo Keita, politician, Prime Minister (b. 1942).
- June 5 – Bayes Ag Bakabo, alleged terrorist and drug dealer; killed during military action

== See also ==
- African Continental Free Trade Area
- COVID-19 pandemic in Africa
- Organisation internationale de la Francophonie
- Economic Community of West African States
- Community of Sahel–Saharan States
