= 2020 in Mali =

- Decades: 2000s; 2010s; 2020s
- See also: History of Mali; List of years in Mali

== Incumbents ==
- President: Ibrahim Boubacar Keïta: Resigned August 19.
- Prime Minister: Boubou Cissé: Resigned August 19.
- President of the National Assembly: Issaka Sidibé: Parliament dissolved August 19.
- National Committee for the Salvation of the People: Established August 19.
  - Chairman: Colonel Assimi Goïta
  - Spokesman: Colonel-Major Ismaël Wagué

== Events ==
=== March ===
- March 26 – Opposition leader Soumaila Cisse and six members of his team are kidnapped.
- March 29 – First round of the 2020 Malian parliamentary election

=== April ===
- April 6 – Bamba attack.
- April 19 – 2nd round of the 2020 Malian parliamentary election.
- April 24 – Mopti attacks.
- April 30 – The Constitutional Court overturns election results for 31 seats and gives Rally for Mali an extra ten seats in Parliament.

=== May ===
- May 10 – Three Chadian peacekeepers with MINUSMA were killed, and four wounded, in a roadside bomb attack in Aguelhok.
- May 23 – Korité, public holiday
- May 26 – Twenty people were killed and at least 11 injured when a minibus traveling between Bamako and Narena collided with a truck.
- May 30 – Opposition parties establish the Mouvement du 5 juin - Rassemblement des forces patriotiques (in French) (June 5 Movement - Rally of Patriotic Forces).

=== June ===
- June 3 – Battle of Talahandak.
- June 5 – Thousands led by Mahmoud Dicko protest under the banner of the June 5 Movement.
- June 11 – Boubou Cisse is reappointed Prime Minister and charged with forming a new government.
- June 19 – Tens of thousands of Malians protested in Bamako to demand the resignation of President Ibrahim Boubacar Keita—see 2020 Malian protests.
- June 20 – ECOWAS called for new elections to be held due to disputes about the legitimacy of the 2020 Malian parliamentary election.

=== July ===
- July 5 – President Ibrahim Boubacar Keita meets with imam Mahmoud Dicko, leader of the June 5 protest movement.
- July 11 – 12 – Protesters in Bamako clash with security forces, who reportedly fired live rounds at the protesters. 11 people were reportedly killed and another 124 injured.
- July 18 – The opposition rejects a new government of national unity proposed by Nigerian President Goodluck Jonathan,
- July 27 – ECOWAS calls for a unity government and warns of sanctions.

=== August ===
- August 10 – Nine new judges for the Constitutional Court were sworn in. Al Jazeera's Nicolas Haque claimed the judges were nominated by a key Keita ally.
- August 11 – Police use tear gas and water cannons to disperse crowds in Independence Square after protests are renewed.
- August 12 – The June 5 Movement announces daily protests.
- August 18 – 2020 Malian coup d'état
  - Soldiers at a base in Kati, Mali mutinied, detaining several civilian and military officials, sparking protests in nearby Bamako.
  - President Ibrahim Boubacar Keïta and Prime Minister Boubou Cissé were arrested by mutinying soldiers, as part of a coup d'état reportedly led by Colonel Malick Diaw and General Sadio Camara.
- August 19 – President Keïta and Prime Minister Cissé are forced to resign; Parliament is dissolved. The National Committee for the Salvation of the People is established.
- August 21 – A report attributed to unidentified sources in the Malian Armed Forces claims that Colonels Malick Diaw and Sadio Camara received training in Russia just a week before the coup.

=== September ===
- September 7 – ECOWAS renews calls for a quick return to civilian rule.
- September 10 – Members of the National Committee for the Salvation of the People (CNSP) meet with civilian and political leaders in order to establish a transitional civilian government by September 15.
- September 11 – The National Committee for the Salvation of the People proposes a transitional government led by a president appointed by the military for two years.
- September 12 – The CNSP agrees to an 18-month political transition period.
- September 15 – Deadline established by ECOWAS to name a civilian government for a one-year transition to free elections.

=== October ===
- October 5 - Over 100 jihadists were released as part of negotiations to secure the release of Soumaïla Cissé and French aid worker Sophie Pétronin.
- October 8 - Sophie Pétronin and Soumaïla Cissé were released from captivity by jihadist militants. Two Italian nationals, Nicola Chiacchio and Pier Luigi Maccalli, were also reported released.
- October 9 - Swiss government confirmed that Swiss Christian missionary Béatrice Stöckli was killed in Mali by jihadists.

=== November ===
- November 13 – French forces kill jihadist leader Ba Ag Moussa near Ménaka Cercle.

=== December ===
- December 23 – United Nations investigators say both the military and rebel groups have committed war crimes and crimes against humanity since 2012.
- December 29 – Three French soldiers are killed by an improvised explosive device (IED) in Mopti Region.

=== Scheduled events ===
- October 29 – Prophet's birthday
- November 5 – Baptism of the Prophet
- December 25 – Christmas Day

== Deaths ==
- February 14 – Adama Kouyaté, photographer (b. 1928).
- July 28 – Zou Diarra, musician (b. 1960).
- September 15 – Moussa Traoré, military officer and politician, former President of Mali (b. 1936).
- November 10 – Amadou Toumani Touré, former President of Mali (b. 1948).
- December 25 – Soumaila Cissé, 71, politician; COVID-19.

== See also ==
- 2020 in West Africa
- COVID-19 pandemic in Mali
- COVID-19 pandemic in Africa
- 2020 Malian protests
- 2020 Malian parliamentary election
- Economic Community of West African States (ECOWAS)
- 2020 Malian coup d'état
- 2012 Malian coup d'état
- Mali War
- Insurgency in the Maghreb (2002–present)
- Mopti attacks (Five attacks in 2020)
