= 2022 in Mali =

- Decades: 2000s; 2010s; 2020s
- See also: History of Mali; List of years in Mali

Events in the year 2022 in Mali.

== Incumbents ==
- President: Assimi Goïta
- Prime Minister: Choguel Kokalla Maïga (until August 21, starting December 5); Abdoulaye Maïga (August 21 to December 5)
- National Committee for the Salvation of the People:
  - Chairman: Colonel Assimi Goïta
  - Spokesman: Colonel-Major Ismaël Wagué

== Events ==
Ongoing — COVID-19 pandemic in Mali and Mali War

=== January to March ===
- January 2 – The United States cuts off Ethiopia, Guinea and Mali from the African Growth and Opportunity Act trade preference program citing their human rights abuses and anti-democratic actions.
- January 9 – The West African nations of the 15-member bloc ECOWAS suspend diplomatic relations with Mali and announce that they are closing their borders with and imposing economic sanctions on Mali in response to an "unacceptable delay" to the country's next general election.
- January 14 – Operation Barkhane: Sweden announces that it will withdraw its troops from a French-led special forces mission in Mali later this year, in response to Mali's ruling military junta inviting private Russian military contractors to fight Islamist rebels. The deployment was originally expected to end in 2024.
- January 23 – A French soldier is killed in a mortar attack on a military camp in Gao, northern Mali.
- January 26 – The Malian junta demands that Denmark withdraw its forces from the country, saying they were never given authorization to participate in the ongoing European-led peacekeeping operations.
- January 31 – The Malian military junta orders the French ambassador to leave the country within 72 hours in response to "outrageous comments" made by the French authorities about Mali's transitional government.
- February 8 – A joint operation by the Malian Armed Forces and the French-led Takuba Task Force kills at least 30 jihadists. A Mirage 2000 fighter jet was involved in the operation, bombing a group of militants on motorbikes.
- February 17 – France and the EU-wide Takuba Task Force announce that they will begin withdrawing from Mali, stating that the military government in place since last year's coup has placed "multiple obstructions" to their counter-terrorism operations.
- February 18 – Eight Malian soldiers and 57 Islamist militants are killed during a gunfight in the Archam region, after 40 civilians were killed there during terrorist attacks last week.
- March 7 –
  - Two United Nations peacekeepers are killed in a bomb attack north of Mopti. Shortly before that, militants kill two Malian soldiers in Gao Region.
  - French forces confirm reports that they killed Algerian-born senior al-Qaeda official Yahia Djouadi in a drone strike in February.
- March 24 – The UEMOA court orders sanctions against Mali to be suspended. The sanctions were imposed on the junta in January after elections were delayed.

=== April to July ===
- April 1 – Mali says that it has killed 203 insurgents in a major nine-day military operation from March 23 to April 1.
- April 5 – Siege of Moura: Human Rights Watch says that the Malian military and mercenaries from the Wagner Group massacred over 300 civilians in the town of Moura during a nine-day counter-insurgency operation in March.
- April 12 – The European Union suspends some of its military activities in Mali due to the alleged involvement of Russian private military companies in the conflict, especially during the Siege of Moura in March.
- April 24 – Six soldiers are killed and twenty others are injured after attacks on three military bases in Mopti and Ségou regions, Mali.
- May 21 – An elderly Italian couple and their son are kidnapped by jihadists in Southern Mali. A Togolese citizen is also reported to have been kidnapped along with the Italians, but authorities say that they are unable to confirm if this is true.
- June 1 – Two Red Cross workers are killed in an attack by unknown militants in Mali. A Jordanian member of the MINUSMA peacekeeping force is also killed and three others are injured in Kidal Region.
- June 6 – Malian junta leader Assimi Goïta declares that Mali will return to civilian rule in March 2024. It was supposed to occur this February until being delayed, prompting sanctions from its neighbors.
- June 18 – At least 20 people die in an attack in Anchawadi commune
- June 20 – 2022 Bankass massacres: Islamist insurgents kill 132 civilians over the weekend in a series of attacks on three villages in the Bankass Cercle of Mali's Mopti Region, including Segue.
- July 5 – Two Egyptian UN peacekeepers are killed and five others are injured when their vehicle hits a mine in northern Mali.
- July 14 – Three civilians and three security forces are killed in an attack by militants at a checkpoint near Bamako, Mali.
- July 15 – Three civilians, two gendarmes and one policeman are killed as gunmen attack a checkpoint in Koulikoro.
- July 22 – The Macina Liberation Front launches an attack on Mali's largest military base in Bamako. One soldier and six of the attackers are killed.

=== August to December ===
- August 7 – Forty-two soldiers and four civilians are killed during an attack near the town of Tessit by Islamic State in the Greater Sahara gunmen. Twenty-two other soldiers are wounded, and 37 of the attackers are also killed.
- August 12 – The German defence ministry suspends its military's aerial reconnaissance and transport operations in Mali after the government of Mali denied the departure of one of their flights.
- August 15 – Operation Barkhane: France formally ends its military intervention in Mali after withdrawing its last remaining troops from a military base in Gao. The base was handed over to Malian Armed Forces before the French forces crossed into neighbouring Niger.
- August 18 – Mali accuses its former ally France of arming jihadist terrorist groups to destabilize the country. Malian Foreign Minister Abdoulaye Diop tells the United Nations that French aircraft are violating the country's airspace and dropping "arms and ammunition" to terrorist groups on the ground. France denies the accusations.
- September 6 – Fights erupt in the village of Talataye between the Islamic State, Jama'at Nasr al-Islam wal Muslimin and the National Movement for the Liberation of Azawad, with the Malian Armed Forces launching airstrikes amid the fighting. At least 30 people are killed.
- October 4 – Two people are killed and 10 others injured after a plane crashes in Gao, Gao Region.
- October 13 – Eleven people are killed and 53 more injured as a bus hit a roadside bomb on a road between Bandiagara and Goundaka, in the Mopti Region.
- October 17 –
  - After killing hundreds of civilians and forcing thousands to flee, the Islamic State in the Greater Sahara is reported to have captured the town of Ansongo in eastern Mali.
  - Four Chadian United Nations peacekeepers are killed and two others are injured in a roadside bombing near Tessalit, Kidal Region.
- November 14 – Operation Newcombe: The United Kingdom announces that it is withdrawing its troops from Mali citing "political instability" and the controversial relationship between the Assimi Goïta-led military junta and Russia's Wagner Group.
- November 17 – The French foreign ministry announces the temporary suspension of development aid to Mali, citing the controversial relationship between the Assimi Goïta-led military junta and Russia's Wagner Group in the war.
- November 21 – The Assimi Goïta-led military junta prohibits the operation of France-supported NGOs in Mali to reciprocate the French government's suspension of development aid for the West African country due to its involvement with Russia's Wagner Group in the war.
- December 16 – Two MINUSMA police personnel are killed and four others are injured after a United Nations Police patrol is attacked in Timbuktu.

== Deaths ==
- January 16 – Ibrahim Boubacar Keïta, politician, president (2013–2020), prime minister (1994–2000) and president of the National Assembly (2002–2007) (born 1945)
- March 21 – Soumeylou Boubèye Maïga, politician, prime minister (2017–2019) and minister of foreign affairs (2011–2012) (born 1954)
- April 4 – Django Sissoko, civil servant, acting prime minister (2012–2013) and minister of justice (1984–1988) (born 1948)
- October 17 – Younoussi Touré, 80, politician, prime minister (1992–1993) and president of the National Assembly (2012–2013).

== See also ==
- African Continental Free Trade Area
- COVID-19 pandemic in Africa
- Organisation internationale de la Francophonie
- Economic Community of West African States
- Community of Sahel–Saharan States
