= 2024 in Mali =

- Decades: 2000s; 2010s; 2020s
- See also: History of Mali; List of years in Mali

Events in the year 2024 in Mali.

== Incumbents ==
- President: Assimi Goïta
- Prime Minister: Choguel Kokalla Maïga (until 20 November); Abdoulaye Maïga (since 21 November)
- National Committee for the Salvation of the People:
  - Chairman: Colonel Assimi Goïta
  - Spokesman: Colonel-Major Ismaël Wagué

== Events ==
=== January ===
- 19 January – At least 73 people die after an artisanal gold mine collapses in Kangaba.
- 19 January – Mali, along with Niger and Burkina Faso, announce their withdrawal from ECOWAS, accusing it of abandoning "the ideals of its founding fathers and pan-Africanism" under foreign influence and imposing "inhumane" sanctions to overthrow their military regimes.

=== February ===
- 19 February – A bus collides with a truck between Kessedougou and Ouan, killing 15 people and injuring 46.
- 26 February – ECOWAS lifts its sanctions on Mali.
- 27 February – A bus falls off a bridge in Koumantou, killing 31 people and injuring ten.

=== March ===
- 7 March – The Alliance of Sahel States, comprising Mali, Burkina Faso and Niger, announce the creation of a joint force between the three countries to combat jihadist groups in the three countries.

=== April ===
- 11 April – The ruling junta issues a decree suspending all political activities until further notice, citing concerns over public order. It also orders a media ban on covering such issues.
- 16 April – At least 110 people are abducted by suspected Islamist militants from three buses travelling near Bandiagara.
- 28 April – Abu Huzeifa, a leader of Islamic State in West Africa, is killed in a military operation in Indelimane, Ménaka Region.

=== June ===
- 8 June – At least 22 miners are killed after a tunnel collapses at a mine in Kalana.
- 20–29 June – Around 46 civilians are killed in an attack on the village of Abeibara in Kidal Region. Community leaders and civil society organisations blame the attack on the Malian military and the Wagner Group.
- 26 June – The International Criminal Court convicts Ansar Dine member al-Hassan Ag Abdoul Aziz of war crimes committed during the group's occupation of Timbuktu from 2012 to 2013. He is sentenced by the ICC to ten years' imprisonment on 20 November.

=== July ===
- 1 July – Djiguibombo massacre: Around 40 people are killed in an attack by unidentified gunmen on the village of Djiguibombo in Mopti Region.
- 2 July – Hamari Traore is suspended as captain of the Mali national football team by the Malian Football Federation for "inciting rebellion" in the national team following his June letter denouncing "poor management" and lack of professionalism in the federation.
- 10 July – The junta lifts the suspension on activities by political parties and political associations that it had imposed in April.
- 19 July – Renowned traditional musician Toumani Diabaté dies at the age of 58 due to a brief illness.
- 21 July – At least 26 people are killed in an attack on the village of Dembo in Bankass, Mopti Region.
- 27 July – Battle of Tinzaouaten (2024): The Tuareg separatist CSP-DPA coalition claims to have routed a column of Malian and Wagner Group forces following two days of clashes outside the village of Tinzaouaten, near the Algerian border, killing 84 Russians and 47 Malians. The Malian army claims that two of its soldiers were killed along with 20 rebels. The Main Directorate of Intelligence of Ukraine claims that it provided assistance to the CSP-DPA.
- 31 July – Mali announces that it carried out joint airstrikes with Burkina Faso on insurgents in and around Tinzaouaten. The CSP-PSD says that a Burkinabe drone strike killed dozens of civilians.

=== August ===
- 4 August – Mali cuts all diplomatic relations with Ukraine for providing intelligence to Tuareg rebels that enabled them to ambush and kill large numbers of Wagner Group mercenaries and Malian troops.
- 9 August – Mali expels the Swedish ambassador in response to Stockholm's decision to cut developmental aid to Bamako over its support for the Russian invasion of Ukraine.
- 15 August – Fifteen soldiers are killed in an ambush by Jama'at Nasr al-Islam wal-Muslimin (JNIM) militants near Diallassagou, Mopti Region.
- 21 August – Burkina Faso, Mali and Niger write to the United Nations Security Council complaining that Ukraine is supporting rebel groups in the Sahel region.
- 25 August – Twenty-one civilians, including 11 children, are killed in a drone strike in Tinzaouaten.
- 26 August – Denmark closes its embassy in Bamako, citing the effects of military coups on its "scope of action".

=== September ===
- 17 September – A series of attacks are held across multiple locations in Bamako, killing more than 77 people and injuring 255 others. The JNIM claims responsibility.

=== November ===
- 8 November – Terence Holohan, the CEO of the Australian firm Resolute Mining, is arrested in Bamako along with two other company employees while visiting Mali to negotiate a business dispute.
- 13 November – Issa Kaou N’Djim, a former vice president of the National Transitional Council, is arrested on charges of insulting a foreign head of state after expressing criticism of the military regime in neighbouring Burkina Faso on television. The incident also leads to the junta cutting the signal of Joliba TV News, on which the criticism occurred, on 26 November.
- 18 November – Resolute Mining agrees to pay $160 million to the Malian government to resolve a tax dispute amid the continued detention of its CEO Terence Holohan and two other employees in Bamako since 8 November.
- 20 November – The junta dismisses Choguel Kokalla Maïga as prime minister along with his cabinet following Maïga accusing the junta of postponing elections to restore civilian rule without informing him.
- 21 November –
  - The junta appoints an army officer, Abdoulaye Maïga as prime minister.
  - The JNIM claims to have killed six Wagner Group mercenaries in an ambush in the Mopti Region.

=== December ===
- 1 December – Eight Tuareg separatist leaders, including Fahad Ag Almahmoud, are killed in a drone strike by the Malian military in Tinzaouaten.
- 16 December – ECOWAS approves the withdrawal of Burkina Faso, Mali and Niger from the bloc effective January 2025 but gives them until July 2025 to reconsider.

=== Scheduled events ===
- 2024 Malian presidential election

== Holidays ==
- 1 January - New Year's Day
- 20 January - Armed Forces Day
- 26 March - Martyrs' Day
- 1 April - Easter Monday
- 10 April – Korité
- 1 May - Labour Day
- 25 May - Africa Day
- 17 June – Tabaski
- 15 September – The Prophet's Birthday
- 22 September - Independence Day
- 23 September - Prophet's Baptism
- 25 December - Christmas Day

== Deaths ==
- 23 February: Adama Samassékou, 78, politician, minister of education (1993–2000).
- 31 May: Berthé Aïssata Bengaly, 67, politician and nutrition researcher.
- 19 July: Toumani Diabaté, 58, kora player.
- 11 September: Malick Touré, 28, footballer (Club Africain, US Biskra, MO Béjaïa).
- 29 September: Doumbi Fakoly, 80, writer.
- 8 October: Mariam Sissoko, 79, socialite, first lady (1968–1991).
- 17 November: Siaka Toumani Sangaré, 69, civil servant and politician, president of the Independent National Electoral Commission of Guinea (2010–2011).
- 1 December: Fahad Ag Almahmoud, Tuareg militant, secretary-general of GATIA (2014–2023).

== See also ==
- African Continental Free Trade Area
- Organisation internationale de la Francophonie
- Economic Community of West African States
- Community of Sahel–Saharan States
