= 2023 in Mali =

- Decades: 2000s; 2010s; 2020s
- See also: History of Mali; List of years in Mali

Events in the year 2023 in Mali.

== Incumbents ==
- President: Assimi Goïta
- Prime Minister: Choguel Kokalla Maïga
- National Committee for the Salvation of the People:
  - Chairman: Colonel Assimi Goïta
  - Spokesman: Colonel-Major Ismaël Wagué

== Events ==
Ongoing — COVID-19 pandemic in Mali and Mali War

- January 2 – Two firefighters and three civilians are killed in an armed attack by Islamist insurgents along a highway between Bamako and Ségou.
- January 6 – Interim president Assimi Goïta pardons 49 Ivorian soldiers who were arrested in July and convicted of "undermining state security".
- February 24 – Twelve people are killed after gunmen attack a village in central Mali.
- June 13 – Fifteen people are killed and several others are injured when two passenger buses collide with a truck between Fana and Konobougou.
- June 18 – 2023 Malian constitutional referendum: Malians vote on a referendum that, among other things, would enhance the powers of the President.
- June 24 – Malians approve amendments to the constitution. Under the changes, the president has the right to hire and fire the prime minister. The constitutional changes also designate Mali as a secular state.
- September 7 – September 2023 Mali attacks
  - In Gourma-Rharous Cercle, jihadists fire rockets at a Comanav vessel on the Niger River.
  - Islamist militants attack a military camp in northeast Mali. The military confirms the death toll of the combined incidents to be 63 in total, including 15 troops and 49 civilians.
- September 8 – September 2023 Mali attacks: Four suicide bombers attack a Malian military base in Bamba, Gao Region, killing an unknown number of people.
- September 16: The military governments of Niger, Mali, and Burkina Faso sign a mutual defence pact named the Alliance of Sahel States in case of internal rebellion or external military aggression.
- September 23: An Ilyushin Il-76 military transport plane reportedly linked to the Wagner Group crashed in Gao International Airport after exceeding the runway.
- October 16: The United Nations peacekeeping mission in Mali, MINUSMA, initiates withdrawal from two camps in Aguelhok and Tessalit, Kidal Region.
- October 31: Tuareg rebels from Platform claim control over a camp in Kidal, northern Mali, following the evacuation of MINUSMA troops.
- November 7: The Malian Armed Forces conducts airstrikes on "terrorist targets" in Kidal, resulting in civilian casualties, amidst claims by local Tuareg groups and witnesses.
- November 14: The Malian Armed Forces recapture the town of Kidal from Tuareg separatist forces, according to junta leader Assimi Goïta.
- December 6: A Malian health director said that Dengue fever was on the rise in the country, with 21 deaths and 600 cases of the disease counted days earlier.
- December 11: MINUSMA officially departs Mali after ten years of peacekeeping in the country. The two remaining MINUSMA bases in Gao and Timbuktu are expected to end operations before MINUSMA's mandate expires on December 31.
- December 22: Mali recalls its ambassador in Algeria after accusing it of interference in its internal affairs by meeting rebel leaders, deepening diplomatic tensions over efforts to end the separatist and Islamist insurgencies in northern Mali.

== See also ==
- African Continental Free Trade Area
- COVID-19 pandemic in Africa
- Organisation internationale de la Francophonie
- Economic Community of West African States
- Community of Sahel–Saharan States
