= 2019 in Mali =

- Decades: 1990s; 2000s; 2010s; 2020s
- See also: History of Mali; List of years in Mali

Events in the year 2019 in Mali.

== Incumbents ==
- President – Ibrahim Boubacar Keïta
- Prime Minister – Soumeylou Boubèye Maïga

== Events ==
- 1 January - An attack on Koulogon village by Dogon militiamen kills 37 civilians.
- 20 January - 2019 Aguelhok attack: Ten Chadian United Nations peacekeepers are killed in and al-Qaeda attack on the MINUSMA base at Aguelhok; 26 others are injured.
- 22 February - Three Guinean peacekeepers from the United Nations Multidimensional Integrated Stabilization Mission in Mali (MINUSMA) are killed and one injured near Siby, Bamako Region.
- 17 March - Raid on Dioura (2019): JNIM raid the Malian base in Dioura, Mopti Region. Fighting lasts hours, vehicles and ammo are destroyed, and commander Mohamed Sidati Ould Cheikh is killed.
- 23 March - Gunmen attack Fulani villages in Ogossagou, central Mali, killing 157 villagers in one of the worst massacres in the country’s recent history.
- 24 March - A Dogon village in the Ogossagou region is attacked, leaving four people dead.
- 18 April - Demonstrators in Bamako protest against the government, calling for the resignation of Prime Minister Soumeylou Boubeye Maiga and withdrawal of the UN peacekeeping mission MINUSMA.
- 9 June - Sobane Da massacre: The Sobane Da village in Mopti Region is attacked by around 50 armed assailants on motorbikes and pickup trucks; the seven-hour assault kills 35 people.
- 3 September - A roadside explosion near Dallah kills 14 bus passengers.
- 3 November - Dozens of soldiers are killed in an Islamic State attack on a military post in Indelimane, Menaka region.
- 25 November - Thirteen French soldiers are killed in a mid-air collision between a Tiger attack helicopter and a Cougar transport helicopter during a combat mission against fighters in northern Mali.

== Deaths ==
- October 28 – Roman Catholic prelate
