= 2018 in Mali =

- Decades: 1990s; 2000s; 2010s; 2020s
- See also: History of Mali; List of years in Mali

Events in the year 2018 in Mali.

== Incumbents ==
- President – Ibrahim Boubacar Keïta
- Prime Minister – Soumeylou Boubèye Maïga

== Events ==
- 29 July – scheduled date for the Malian presidential election, 2018
- November or December – scheduled date for the Malian parliamentary election, 2018

== Deaths ==
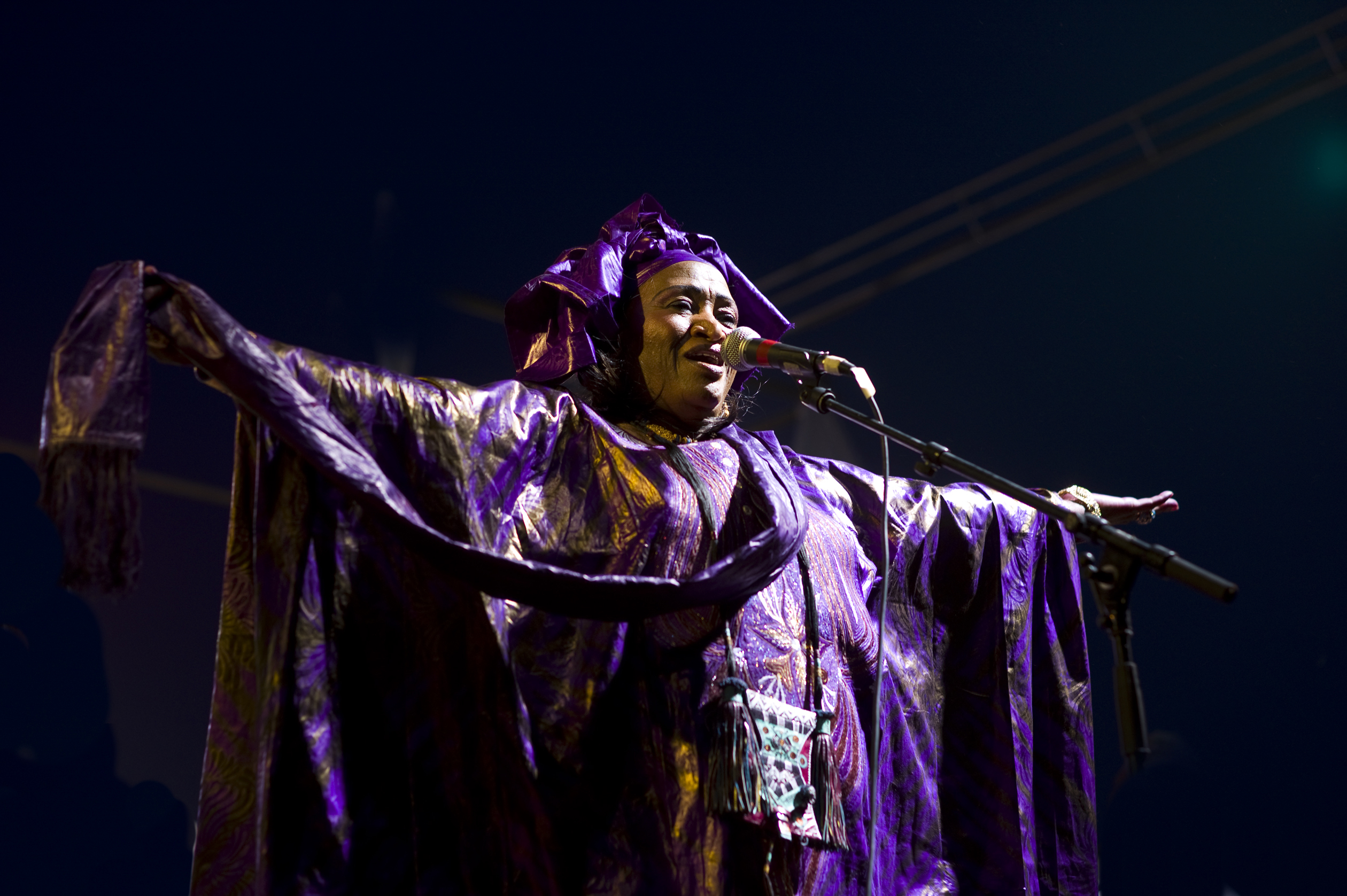
Khaira Arby

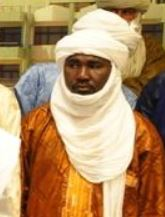
Mahamadou Djeri Maïga

- 9 June – Ogobara Doumbo, medical researcher (b. 1956).
- 19 August – Khaira Arby, singer (b. 1959).
- 22 October – Mahamadou Djeri Maïga, politician and Azawad separatist (b. 1972).
- 28 December – Seydou Badian Kouyaté, writer and politician (b. 1928).
