= 2013 in Mali =

- Decades: 1990s; 2000s; 2010s; 2020s
- See also: History of Mali; List of years in Mali

The following lists events that happened during 2013 in the Republic of Mali.

== Events ==
=== January ===
- 8 January - The Malian army used artillery on Islamist rebels in Gnimignama in the first skirmish between the two belligerents since April 2012, when Islamist and Tuareg rebels first assumed control of the region.
- 10 January - Islamists capture the town of Konna, previously held by the Malian army.
- 11 January - France commits troops to aid government forces in the Northern Mali conflict.
- 12 January - A French pilot is killed in a helicopter raid in northern Mali, according to French Minister of Defence Jean-Yves Le Drian.
- 14 January - Islamists rebels capture Diabaly after fierce fighting with government troops, as French airplanes strike targets in Gao.
- 15 January - African troops are to be deployed in Mali to fight alongside French and Malian soldiers within a week.
- 16 January - French troops are reported to be fighting rebels in Diabaly alongside Malian troops.
- 17 January - Northern Mali conflict
  - The number of French forces in the country rises to 1,400, more than half of the planned 2,500 strong force, as its troops continue to fight insurgents in Konna and Diabaly. Chad prepares to send the first 200 troops of a 2000-strong force to assist in the military operations as part of a regional mission. The European Union votes to send 450 to 500 "non-combat" troops to Mali, half of them are trainers.
  - The first West African troops enter Mali. 100 soldiers from the Togolese military enter the country with Nigerian military due to enter shortly afterward.
- 18 January - The Military of Mali recaptures the town of Konna three days after French jets drove out Islamist militants.
- 20 January - Islamists flee the town of Diabaly after repeated French airstrikes. The government of Mali now says that they control the city.
- 21 January - French and Malian troops retake Diabaly and Douentza as Islamist forces retreat.
- 24 January - The Malian army says it is investigating allegations that soldiers have carried out summary executions in the Islamist-controlled north of Mali.
- 25 January - The Malian army retakes the town of Hombori after driving Islamist forces out.
- 26 January - French-led troops in Mali take control of Gao International Airport in the northern town and Islamist stronghold of Gao.
- 27 January - French forces prepare an attack on Timbuktu to defeat Islamists, as more African troops are sent into Mali.
- 28 January - Northern Mali conflict
  - French troops take over Timbuktu Airport as they enter the city without any resistance from the Islamists. Residents report that the French now control all access to the city.
  - The fleeing Islamists set on fire the Timbuktu library containing the Timbuktu Manuscripts. The extent of the damage is still unknown.
- 29 January - Northern Mali conflict
  - The UK announces it will deploy 330 military personnel to Mali and other West African countries in support of French forces operating in the area.
  - French troops take Timbuktu while Tuareg forces of MNLA claim they control the city of Kidal.
- 30 January - French forces enter the city of Kidal after seizing its airport overnight.

=== February ===
- 8 February - The country's first reported suicide bomber blows himself up in Gao, injuring one Malian soldier. In the north, French and Chadian forces retake the city of Tessalit.
- 10 February - Firefights between Islamists and the Malian Army break out in Gao.
- 11 February - Insurgents launch an attack on the strategic city of Gao, capturing a police station and sparking a day-long firefight that included Malian troops, as well as French attack helicopters.
- 22 February - 13 Chadian soldiers and 65 Islamist insurgents are killed in heavy fighting in a remote part of northern Mali.
- 24 February - 10 Chadian soldiers and 28 Islamist insurgents are killed in heavy fighting in the Adrar des Ifoghas mountains of northern Mali.

=== March ===
- 1 March - One of Islamist organisation al-Qaeda's most feared commanders in Africa, Abdelhamid Abou Zeid, is killed by Chadian forces in Northern Mali.
- 2 March - Chadian soldiers kill Mokhtar Belmokhtar, an al-Qaeda commander in Mali responsible for a mass hostage-taking at an Algerian gas plant.
- 4 March - Northern Mali conflict
  - French officials announce that a soldier was killed in action during contact with Islamic militants over the weekend. It is France's third casualty since operations began in Operation Serval.
  - France claims that it is "probable" that al-Qaeda in the Islamic Maghreb chief Abdelhamid Abou Zeid was killed in Mali in late February.
- 23 March - France formally confirms death of Islamist commander Abdelhamid Abou Zeid, a senior al-Qaeda in the Islamic Maghreb in February, after DNA tests.
- 27 March - The government of Mali announces that 63 of their soldiers have been killed fighting jihadists since the French led intervention Operation Serval in January 2013.
- 31 March - Rebel Islamist fighters attempt to infiltrate Timbuktu, but are repelled by French and Malian forces.

=== April ===
- 6 April - Northern Mali conflict
  - Tuareg separatists in Northern Mali mark the one year anniversary since the founding of the unilaterally declared Azawad.
  - One soldier is killed when the National Guard attacked a camp occupied by police who supported the 2012 Malian coup d'état that ousted the Malian president.
- 12 April - Two suicide bombers kill three Chadian soldiers and injure dozens of civilians at a market in Kidal.
- 25 April -
  - Intercommunal clashes erupt in Anéfis between Tilemsi Arabs and Kunta Arabs, leaving 6 people dead.
  - The UN Security Council adopts Resolution 2100, establishing the United Nations Multidimensional Integrated Stabilization Mission in Mali (MINUSMA) to replace AFISMA, authorizing 11,200 military personnel and 1,440 police personnel.

=== June ===
- 1 June - Tuareg MNLA forces arbitrarily detain about 100 men, mostly darker-skinned non-Tuareg residents, in Kidal; many are robbed, threatened, or beaten.
- 5 June - The Malian Army captures the town of Anéfis after clashing with MNLA forces, with fighting lasting several hours, and around 30 MNLA fighters killed.
- 18 June - The Malian government and Tuareg rebel groups sign a preliminary peace agreement aimed at enabling presidential elections.

=== October ===
- 23 October - Katiba Salahadin militants attack Chadian MINUSMA peacekeepers in Tessalit, Kidal Region, killing three and wounding nine.

=== November ===
- 2 November - Two French journalists are abducted—and later executed—in Kidal by AQIM-linked armed jihadists.

=== December ===
- 14 December - A suicide car bomb by Katibat Salahadin in Kidal kills two Senegalese peacekeepers, injures several more, and destroys the Malian Solidarity Bank.
- 18 December - The Rally for Mali (RPM), President Ibrahim Boubacar Keita’s party, wins a majority in the parliamentary elections, securing 61 of 147 seats.
