= 2026 in Mali =

- Decades: 2000s; 2010s; 2020s
- See also: History of Mali; List of years in Mali

Events in the year 2026 in Mali.

== Incumbents ==
- President: Assimi Goïta
- Prime Minister: Abdoulaye Maïga
- National Committee for the Salvation of the People:
  - Chairman: Colonel Assimi Goïta
  - Spokesman: Colonel-Major Ismaël Wagué

== Events ==
=== January ===
- 3 January – Seven employees are taken hostage in a jihadist attack on the Morila Gold Mine in Sikasso Region; all hostages are released the following evening.
- 8 January – A ferry sinks after hitting rocks along the Niger River in Diré, Tombouctou Region, killing at least 38 people.
- 11 January – Several people are abducted in a jihadist attack on three industrial sites in Kayes Region.
- 19 January – The junta appoints Hilaire Bébien Diarra to head a new ministerial-level position in charge of the mining sector and superseding the Ministry of Mines.
- 22 January – The government announces the imposition of nationwide fuel rationing in response to the blockade of supplies by jihadists.
- 29 January – At least 15 people are killed in a JNIM attack on a fuel tanker convoy in the west of the country.

=== February ===
- 5 February – The junta arrests Youssouf Sissoko, editor-in-chief of the weekly newspaper L’Alternance, in Bamako on charges of insulting a foreign head of state after publishing an article critical of Nigerien president Abdourahamane Tiani.
- 27 February – The United States lifts sanctions on Defense Minister Sadio Camara and two senior military officials over their involvement with the Wagner Group.

=== April ===
- 10 April – Mali withdraws recognition of the Sahrawi Arab Democratic Republic and endorses the Moroccan autonomy proposal for the Western Sahara.
- 25 April – A number of coordinated attacks led by JNIM alongside the Azawad Liberation Front occur in various locations across Mali. Sadio Camara, the minister of defence, is killed during the attacks.

=== May ===
- 2 May – Former education minister and junta critic Mountaga Tall is abducted by unidentified individuals from his residence in Bamako.
- 4 May – President Goïta assumes the additional role of defence minister following the killing of Sadio Camara in the 2026 Mali offensives.
- 7 May – At least 50 people are killed in a JNIM attack on two villages in Mopti Region.

=== June ===
- 1 June – At least eight people are killed, and 42 injured, when a civilian passenger bus strikes a land mine on the Bamako–Kayes road near Bamako.
- 3 June – The government bans the usage of motorcycles with an engine capacity of 125 cc and above outside major urban centres.
- 5 June – A court sentences French national Yann Vezilier to 20 years' imprisonment, after convicting him over an alleged plot to destabilise the government of President Goïta in 2025.

=== July ===
- 2 July – The government establishes the Malian Office of Precious Substances, a new state body to regulate and centralise the country's artisanal gold trade.
- 11 July – Mali restores diplomatic relations with Algeria after a yearlong rift.
- 15 June – At least eight civilians are killed in an airstrike on the village of Kyrnia in the Mopti Region that Human Rights Watch attributes to the Russian Africa Corps.
- 18 July – More than 50 soldiers and Russian Africa Corps personnel are killed in an ambush by the Azawad Liberation Front and JNIM in the Gao Region.

=== August ===
- 9 August – JNIM militants launch an attack on an army garrison in San; 40 militants and 10 soldiers are killed.
- 13 August – President Goïta pardons French national Yann Vezilier, who had been sentenced in June to 20 years in prison over alleged involvement in a plot to destabilise Mali on behalf of the DGSE.

== Holidays ==
- 1 January – New Year's Day
- 20 January – Armed Forces Day
- 16 March – Leylatoul Qadr
- 20 March – Korité
- 26 March – Martyrs' Day
- 6 April – Easter Monday
- 1 May – Labour Day
- 25 May – Africa Day
- 27 May – Tabaski
- 21 June – June Solstice
- 26 June – Ashura
- 26 August – The Prophet's Birthday
- 1 September – Prophet's Baptism
- 22 September – Independence Day
- 23 September – September Equinox
- 21 December – December Solstice
- 25 December – Christmas Day

== Deaths ==
- 25 April – Sadio Camara, 47, minister of defence (since 2020)
- 17 July – Germain Berthé, 32, footballer (Horoya AC, Real Bamako, national team)
- 24 July – Kalilou Traoré, 38, footballer (Istra 1961, Real Bamako, national team)
