= Fooïta skirmish =

2013 battle of the Mali War

- Part of Mali War
Date	September 11, 2013
Location	Fooïta, Mali
Result	Indecisive

Belligerents
Mali	MNLA; HCUA

Casualties and losses
3 injured (per Mali); 11 killed (per MNLA)	2 injured (per MNLA); 3 killed, 10 captured (per Mali)

On September 11, 2013, clashes broke out between Malian forces and National Movement for the Liberation of Azawad (MNLA) fighters at a camp near the village of Fooïta, near the Mauritanian border. The battle was the first conflict between the Malian government and MNLA since the signing of the Ouagadougou Agreement.

== Background ==
Three months prior to the clashes, Malian and MNLA representatives signed the Ouagadougou Agreement following the Malian counteroffensive capturing Anéfis and other areas originally captured by the MNLA in the initial stages of the Mali War. The two sides agreed on an immediate ceasefire, and the MNLA and High Council for the Unity of Azawad (HCUA) agreed on seeking autonomy within Mali. Malian army spokesman Souleymane Maiga stated that in the area around Fooïta, fairground workers and civilians had been attacked by bandits, and that the population called on the Malian army for help. He stated "If individuals are sowing terror by posing as fighters of the MNLA, I think there really is a problem."

== Skirmish ==
Both the Malian army and the MNLA have differing claims of how the clashes started. Malian forces claimed to have been carrying out a security operation against bandits in the region neat Léré, and denied having confronted the MNLA. Malian captain Modibo Traoré stated that his patrol stumbled upon armed men travelling in all-terrain vehicles, and that the individuals refused to obey orders. In response, Traoré's patrol opened fire on the group.

The MNLA claimed the attack took place in the site of a newly-established cantonment in line with the Ouagadougou Agreement and approval from Malian officials. Malian officials, however, denied knowledge of this. An MNLA spokesman stated that around twenty pick-ups and eight armored vehicles from the Malian Army surrounded the camp at Fooïta before shooting. The MNLA also denounced the arrest of several civilians. The Malian military announced the arrest of twenty people for having guns in their homes, and stated that two days prior to the skirmish, eleven MNLA-aligned bandits were arrested in Tombouctou Region.

== Aftermath ==
The Malian Ministry of Defense announced that three soldiers were injured in the clash and three "bandits" were killed, and ten others taken prisoner. The MNLA claimed the deaths of eleven Malian soldiers and that only one MNLA fighter was injured. MNLA vice-president Mahamadou Djeri Maïga stated two fighters were injured, and several Malian soldiers were killed.

Bilal Ag Acherif, secretary-general of the MNLA, denounced the violation of the Ouagadougou Agreement, and lambasted MINUSMA for failing to respect the establishment of the cantonment in Fooïta. Several MNLA commanders pressured Acherif to take up arms again, but he relented. The Malian Army accused the MNLA of being involved in banditry.
