= 2016 Aguelhok ambush =

2016 militants attack on Chadian forces in Aguelhok, Mali

- Part of Mali War
Date	May 18, 2016
Location	North of Aguelhok, Mali 19.47°N 0.86°E
Result	Indecisive

Belligerents
MINUSMA: Chad	Ansar Dine

Casualties and losses
6 killed 2 wounded	Unknown
- 1 civilian killed

On May 18, 2016, militants from Ansar Dine ambushed Chadian forces north of Aguelhok, Mali.

== Background ==
Aguelhok had been the site of a massacre by Tuareg separatists in the early days of the Mali War. Afterwards, Chadian peacekeepers as part of the United Nations Multidimensional Integrated Stabilization Mission in Mali (MINUSMA) staffed a base there.

== Ambush ==
Around 5 pm, 15 kilometres (9.3 mi) north of Aguelhok, the Chadian peacekeepers hit a mine laid by Ansar Dine on the road, while they were escorting a logistics convoy. Four soldiers were killed in the initial blast, prompting jihadists on the east and west ditches to open fire on the convoy, with Chadian soldiers fighting back. The attackers stalled after a period of time, possibly fleeing. A MINUSMA plane flew over the site that night, and Chadian soldiers conducted patrols in the area the next day.

== Aftermath ==
The attack was claimed on May 19 by Ansar Dine in a press release by Noureddine Ag Mohamed. Mohamed claimed "many enemies have remained lying down forever", but did not give a toll. MINUSMA announced that same day that five Chadian soldiers were killed in the ambush, and three were injured. One of the wounded succumbed to his wounds on May 24, bringing the toll to six killed and two wounded.

Three people were arrested by Chadian forces for the attack. One, a Tuareg shepherd, died in captivity on May 19 a few hours after his arrest. Two other suspects were released, a son and a relative of the shepherd.
