= 2014 Aguelhok attack =

Suicide bombing in Mali

- Part of Mali War
- Location: 19.465°N 0.855°E; Aguelhok, Mali
- Date: 11 June 2014
- Target: MINUSMA and Malian soldiers
- Deaths: 5 (four Chadian soldiers and one suicide bomber)
- Injuries: 10 (six Chadian peacekeepers and four Malian soldiers)
- Perpetrator: Unknown jihadists

On 11 June 2014, a suicide bomber attacked the MINUSMA base in Aguelhok, Mali, killing several Chadian peacekeepers.

== Background ==
Following the Second Battle of Kidal in May, Tuareg rebels launched an incursion into the town of Aguelhok on 21 May. The 290 Malian soldiers present at the garrison in the town sought refuge at the MINUSMA base in the town staffed by Chadian peacekeepers. A few days later, eighty Imghad Tuareg militants and civilians who were sympathetic to the government also sought relief at the MINUSMA base. On the day of the attack, at least 600 soldiers were present at the base.

== Attack ==
On 11 June, a suicide bomber entered the northern part of Aguelhok in a VBIED painted white and with the UN logo. He drives around the city twice in the MINUSMA decoy truck, in order to locate the places where the peacekeepers and soldiers were gathered. Meanwhile, a small group of jihadists launched RPGs towards the MINUSMA base, attempting to spur a panic. The VBIED approached to around twenty meters from the MINUSMA camp, but was quickly detected by the Chadian soldiers who opened fire on the truck. Almost immediately, the suicide bomber blew himself up at the entrance of the camp, immediately killing and injuring several soldiers.

== Aftermath ==
According to MINUSMA, four Chadian soldiers were killed and ten were injured in the attack. Four of the ten soldiers injured were Malian soldiers, and the other six were from MINUSMA. Bert Koenders, the head of MINUSMA, called the attack "cowardly and heinous."
