= 2025 in Mali =

- Decades: 2000s; 2010s; 2020s
- See also: History of Mali; List of years in Mali

The following lists events that happened during 2025 in Mali.

== Incumbents ==
- President: Assimi Goïta
- Prime Minister: Abdoulaye Maïga
- National Committee for the Salvation of the People:
  - Chairman: Colonel Assimi Goïta
  - Spokesman: Colonel-Major Ismaël Wagué

== Events ==
=== January ===
- 13 January – A ferry strikes rocks and sinks on the Niger River in Tombouctou Region, killing at least 38 people.
- 20 January – The Azawad Liberation Front releases a Spanish national who was abducted in southern Algeria by a "transnational mafia" on 17 January and taken to Indelimane in the Ménaka Region, where he was rescued.
- 22 January – Niger announces the creation of a joint military force with Burkina Faso and Mali to combat extremist groups.
- 29 January –
  - Mali, along with Burkina Faso and Niger, formally leave ECOWAS.
  - An unspecified number of miners are killed in a landslide at a gold mine in Koulikoro Region.

=== February ===
- 7 February – At least 56 people are killed in a gun attack on a convoy in Kobe, near Gao.
- 15 February – At least 42 people are killed in the collapse of a gold mine near Kéniéba, Kayes Region.
- 17 February – The Azawad Liberation Front accuses the Malian Army and the Wagner Group of killing 24 civilians in an attack on a convoy traveling from Gao to Algeria.

=== March ===
- 5 March – The government suspends the licenses of foreign artisanal gold mining companies in response to the series of disasters in gold mines.
- 16 March – The Collective for the Defense of the Rights of the Azawad People accuses the Malian army of carrying out an airstrike on a market north of Lerneb in Tombouctou Region that killed 18 civilians. In response, the army says it had killed 11 "terrorists".
- 18 March – Mali withdraws from the Organisation internationale de la Francophonie, citing "selective application of sanctions" and "contempt for Mali’s sovereignty".

=== April ===
- 6 April – Burkina Faso, Niger and Mali withdraw their ambassadors from Algeria as part of protests against claims by Algiers that it had shot down a drone near the Malian border on 31 March.

=== May ===
- 3 May – The first pro-democracy demonstrations in Mali since the 2021 coup are held in Bamako in protest against proposals by the transitional government to dissolve all political parties.
- 4 May – A convoy transporting mining equipment from Bamako to Sadiola is attacked between Diema and Sandare in the Kayes Region.
- 7 May – The junta orders an indefinite suspension of activity by political parties.
- 8 May – Two prodemocracy activists are abducted by suspected soldiers in separate incidents in Bamako and Kati.
- 12 May –
  - Three people are killed while two others are abducted in attacks by gunmen on Narena.
  - The army is accused of killing 27 people in the village of Diafarabé.
- 13 May – President Goita signs a decree dissolving all political parties in the country.
- 14 May – The High Authority for Communication issues a broadcasting ban on the French TV channel TV5 Monde for its coverage of the 2025 Malian protests.
- 24 May – The JNIM claims to have killed 40 soldiers in an attack on an army garrison in Dioura.

=== June ===
- 2 June – At least 60 soldiers are killed in attacks on Timbuktu Airport and army garrisons at Timbuktu and Boulkessi.
- 6 June – The Wagner Group announces its withdrawal from Mali.
- 12 June – Dozens are reported killed in clashes between Azawad separatists against the Malian Army and the Russian Africa Corps in Kidal Region.

=== July ===
- 1 July –
  - The JNIM launches a series of coordinated attacks on military positions in seven towns across western and central Mali. The army reports that it had killed 80 militants, and confirms that several barracks and dozens of military positions were taken over temporarily during the assaults.
  - Three Indian nationals are abducted by gunmen from a cement factory in Kayes.
- 3 July – The transitional parliament allows President Assimi Goita to stay in office for a renewable five-year term.

=== August ===
- 1 August – Former prime minister Moussa Mara is arrested on charges of "damaging the state’s credibility" after expressing support on social media for imprisoned critics of the junta. He is convicted and sentenced to two years' imprisonment on 27 October.
- 3 August – Four Moroccan truck drivers taken hostage by Islamic State – Sahel Province in Burkina Faso while driving from Morocco to Niger in January are released in Mali.
- 10 August – Generals Abass Dembele, a former governor of Mopti Region, and Nema Sagara, are arrested along with at least 19 soldiers, several civilians and a French national on suspicion of plotting a coup against the junta. On 14 August, the junta accuses French intelligence services of involvement.
- 12 August – Former prime minister Choguel Kokalla Maïga is arrested amid an investigation into corruption allegations.
- 19 August – At least 21 soldiers are reported killed in a JNIM attack on Farabougou and Biriki-Wèrè.
- 24 August – Mali finishes second at FIBA AfroBasket 2025 in Angola after losing to the home team 70-43 in the final in Luanda.
- 30 August – The mayor of Dogofry in Ségou Region is shot dead by suspected Dozo hunters.

=== September ===
- 4 September – Mali files a case in the International Court of Justice against Algeria over the latter's shootdown of a Malian military drone in the Tinzaouaten area on 31 March.
- 6 September – JNIM militants set fire to several fuel trucks in Sikasso Region.
- 9 September – The military launches airstrikes against the JNIM in Kayes Region.
- 19 September – The French government suspends counterterrorism cooperation with Mali and expels two Malian diplomats; Mali then expels five French embassy staff.
- 22 September – Mali, Burkina Faso and Niger jointly announce their withdrawal from the International Criminal Court, accusing it of selective justice.

=== October ===
- 12 October – Mali imposes a bond of up to $10,000 for US nationals seeking business and tourist visas in retaliation for similar requirements imposed by the United States on would-be visitors from Mali on 10 October.
- 27 October – Mali announces the nationwide closure of schools and universities until 9 November due to severe fuel shortages caused by the jihadist blockade on fuel imports.

=== November ===
- 7 November – Mariam Cissé, a TikTok user known for praising the Malian Armed Forces, is abducted by armed men in Tonka, Tombouctou Region and executed in public.
- 14 November – The government suspends French television channels TF1 and La Chaîne Info from airing in the country, accusing them of unverified claims and falsehoods in broadcasts about the ongoing fuel blockades by JNIM.
- 18 November – The Malian army and allied militias attack two villages in Ségou Region, killing at least 31 civilians.
- 24 November – The government and Barrick Mining announce an agreement to end a two-year dispute over revenues from the 2023 mining code and restore control over the Loulo-Gounkoto mine to Barrick.

=== December ===
- 16 December – US President Donald Trump issues a proclamation barring Malian nationals from entering the United States.
- 21 December – Burkina Faso, Mali and Niger launch a joint security force under the auspices of the Alliance of Sahel States following a ceremony in Bamako.
- 30 December – Mali announces a reciprocal travel ban on U.S. citizens in response to the ban issued by the Trump administration on Malian nationals.

== Holidays ==
- 1 January – New Year's Day
- 20 January – Armed Forces Day
- 26 March – Martyrs' Day
- 30 March – Korité
- 21 April – Easter Monday
- 1 May – Labour Day
- 25 May – Africa Day
- 7 June – Tabaski
- 5 September – The Prophet's Birthday
- 12 September – Prophet's Baptism
- 22 September – Independence Day
- 25 December – Christmas Day

== Deaths ==
- 19 February – Souleymane Cissé, 84, film director (Yeelen, The Young Girl, Waati).
- 4 April – Amadou Bagayoko, 70, guitarist and singer.
- 4 April – Keïta Fatoumata Diallo, 82, archivist, first lady (1962–1968).
- 15 October – Soumana Sacko, 74, acting prime minister (1991–1992).

== See also ==
- African Continental Free Trade Area
- Organisation internationale de la Francophonie
- Economic Community of West African States
- Community of Sahel–Saharan States
