= 2019 Aguelhok attack =

Attack by Jama'at Nasr al-Islam wal Muslimin against the MINUSMA

- Part of Mali War
| Date | January 20, 2019 |
| Location | MINUSMA camp, Aguelhok, Mali 19°28′N 0°52′E |
| Result | MINUSMA victory |

Belligerents
| MINUSMA: Chad; Bangladesh; France | Jama'at Nasr al-Islam wal Muslimin |

Strength
| ~200 men 20-40 men Unknown | ~150 |

Casualties and losses
| 11 killed, 26 injured None; None | 3 killed 1 injured |

The 2019 Aguelhok attack was an attack by Jama'at Nasr al-Islam wal Muslimin against the MINUSMA base in Aguelhok, Mali on January 20, 2019. At the time of the attack, the base was defended by Chadian and Bangladeshi peacekeepers and was later aided by French forces as part of Operation Barkhane.

== Prelude ==
In 2012, Tuareg militants rebelled against the Malian government due to a lack of autonomy. The rebellion grew quickly, with the MNLA capturing key northern Malian towns like Kidal, Gao, and Aguelhok. However, jihadist rebels from groups like Al-Mourabitoun and Ansar Dine also rebelled against the Malian government, sparking French forces to launch Operation Barkhane to kick all rebels out, and MINUSMA to launch bases in northern and eastern Mali. In 2017, all jihadist rebels merged into the al-Qaeda-aligned Jama'at Nasr al-Islam wal Muslimin, which grew in power and influence in 2018 and 2019.

The Aguelhok camp in particular was established in 2013, and had been the subject of several jihadist attacks. In an April 2018 attack against the camp, two Chadian soldiers were killed. By late 2018, the MINUSMA camp at Aguelhok was defended by a special forces company and an infantry company from Chad as well as an engineering platoon from Bangladesh. On January 6, 2019, several days before the battle, soldiers from the 6th Chadian contingent of MINUSMA arrived at the base.

== Battle ==
At dawn on January 20, around 150 men with 15 pickups attacked the Aguelhok camp along with one of its security posts. The attackers divided into three groups, and converged on the camp from three separate directions. The first two groups of jihadists were able to storm the checkpoints, and the third checkpoint was able to hold off the jihadists and prepare for reinforcements. A suicide bomber exploded at one of the checkpoints. At the time of the attack, MINUSMA released a statement about "a complex attack" with "numerous armed vehicles." Chadian forces sent reinforcements to the camp, leading three counterattacks. MINUSMA helicopters from Tessalit also aided the reinforcements, along with French troops and drones from Kidal. After twenty-two hours, MINUSMA peacekeepers were able to "neutralize a number of enemies" and force the jihadists to disperse. Canadian peacekeepers later set aircraft from Gao to evacuate the wounded.

JNIM later claimed responsibility for the attack, stating that it was a response to Israeli prime minister Benjamin Netanyahu's recent trip to Chad.

== Aftermath ==
On the evening on January 20, UN secretary-general António Guterres announced that ten Chadian peacekeepers had been killed in the attack, along with 25 others injured. Another Chadian soldier succumbed to his injuries on February 15. The UN gave a death toll of 11 peacekeepers killed and 26 injured, including 14 seriously, in the attack. Three jihadists were killed, and another was injured and taken prisoner.

The bodies of the slain Chadian soldiers received a funeral in Bamako, and were repatriated in N'Djamena on January 27. The head of MINUSMA, Mahamat Saleh Annadif, of Chadian nationality, denounced the attack.

The battle of Aguelhok was the deadliest attack on a MINUSMA camp since 2013.
