= 2015 in Mali =

- Decades: 1990s; 2000s; 2010s; 2020s
- See also: History of Mali; List of years in Mali

The following is a list of events that occurred in 2015 in Mali.

== Events ==
=== January ===
- January 4 – A vehicle carrying United Nations peacekeepers hits a roadside bomb in northern Mali injuring six soldiers.

=== March ===
- March 7 – A suspected terrorist attack in Bamako kills five people.
- March 8 – A rocket and shelling attack in Kidal, northern Mali kills three people, including a UN peacekeeper.

=== August ===
- August 7 – Gunmen storm the Hotel Byblos in Sévaré and take hostages. Three hostages were killed as well as five soldiers and the four suspected Islamist militants. according to government spokesman Choguel Kokala Maiga.
