= Timtaghène =

- Commune
- Location of Inabag in Mali
- Coordinates: 19°28′N 1°10′W
- Country: Mali
- Region: Kidal Region
- Cercle: Tessalit Cercle

Area
  - Total: 30,000 km^{2} (12,000 sq mi)

Population (2009)
  - Total: 2,470
  - Density: 0.082/km^{2} (0.21/sq mi)
- Time zone: UTC+0 (GMT)

Timtaghène is a rural commune in the Cercle of Tessalit in the Kidal Region of north-eastern Mali. The main village (chef-lieu) of the commune is Inabag which is 212 km (132 mi) due west of Aguelhok, 242 km (150 mi) southwest of Tessalit and 357 km (222 mi) northeast of Timbuktu. In the census of 2009 the commune had a population of 2,470. The commune is entirely desert and covers an area of approximately 30,000 km^{2}, but it includes the settlements of Alybadine, Darassal, Tadjoudjoult, Tachrak, Tawhoutène, Tin Kar (Timétrine) and Teghaw-Ghawen.

The village of Inabag is located near the well marked as Mabroûk on maps published by Institute Géographique National in Paris.
