= Tessalit Cercle =

Coordinates: 20°00′N 0°10′E

Tessalit
- Cercle
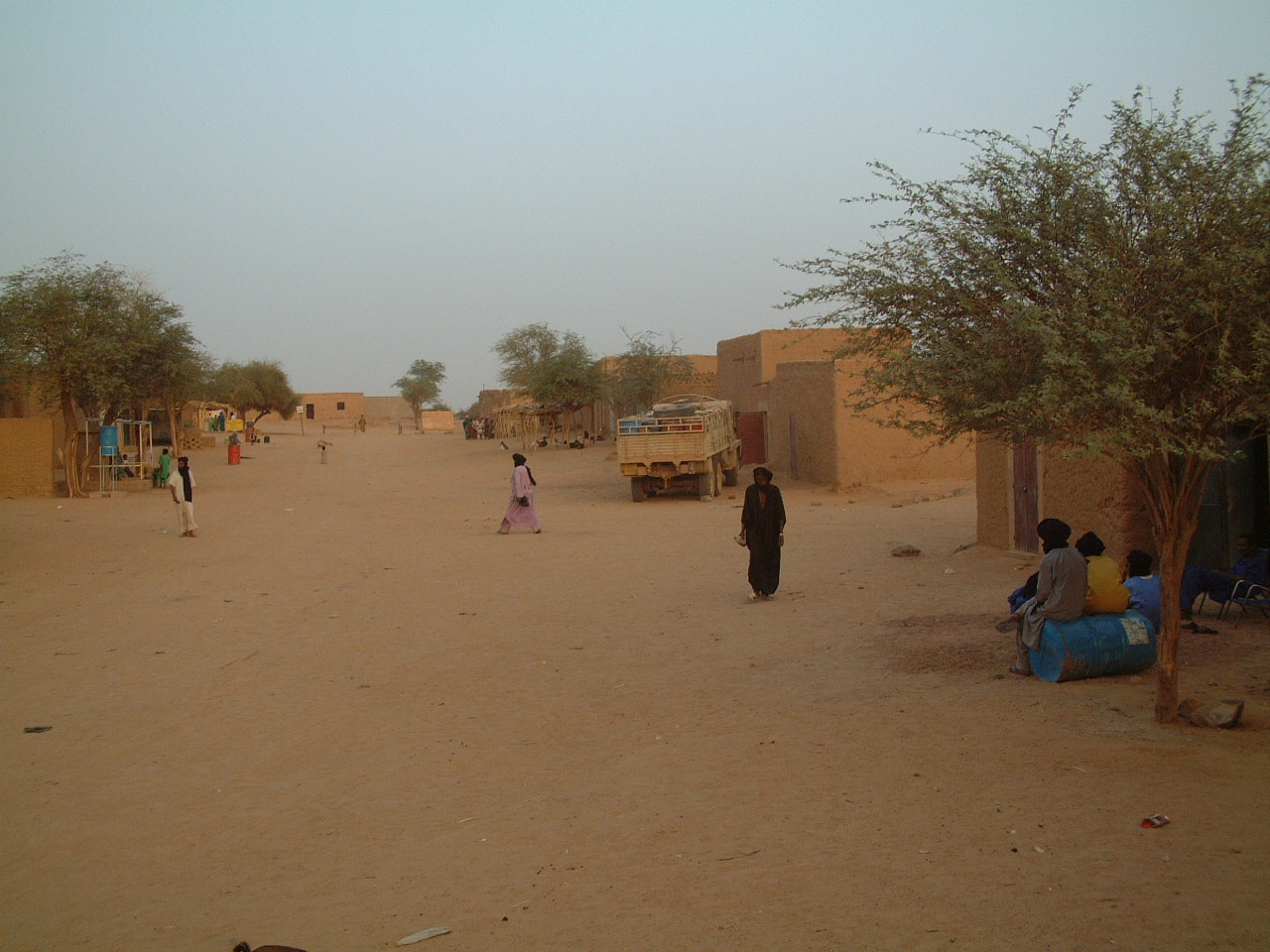
- Commune of Aguelhok in Tessalit Cercle

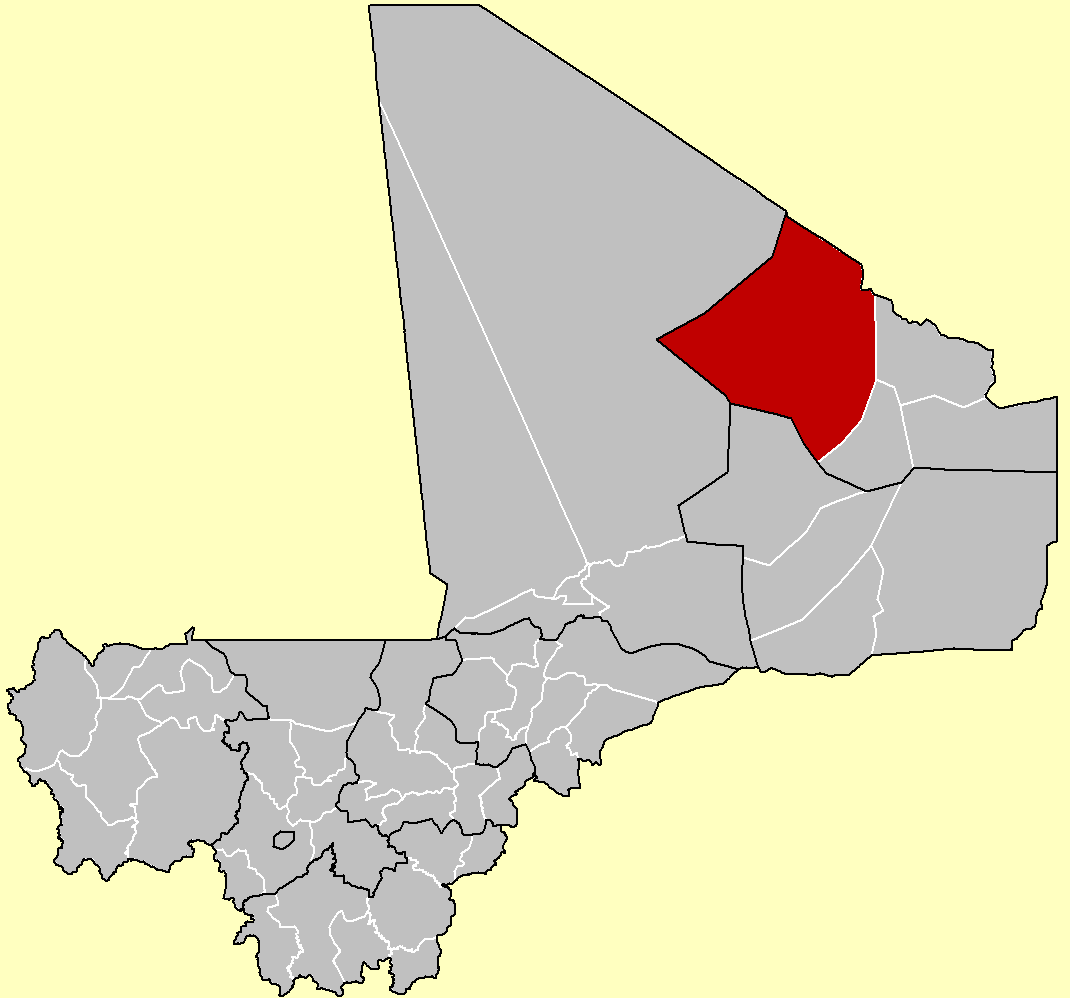
- Tessalit Cercle in Mali
- Country: Mali
- Region: Kidal Region
- Capital: Tessalit

Population (2009)
  - Total: 16,289
- Time zone: UTC+0 (GMT)

Tessalit Cercle is an administrative subdivision of the Kidal Region of Mali. The administrative centre is the village of Tessalit. The cercle is divided into communes, and below this, quarters/villages. As of 2009 the cercle had a population of 16,289.

== Communes ==
The Tessalit Cercle contains the following rural communes:

- Adjelhoc (Aguelhok)
- Tessalit
- Timtaghene
