= Souéloum Diagho =

Souéloum Diagho, the contemporary Tuareg poet, comes from Tessalit in the North of Mali. His father is a Tuareg and his mother a Fula. He is married and lived for a time in Belgium. He is author and editor of the 2001 work Poésies touareg : le chant des saisons (Tuareg poetry: Song of the seasons), a collection of some 175 traditional poems.

Although primarily writing in French, he is in the tradition of Ghaylan ibn 'Uqbah, seeing the Tuareg as quintessentially Keltamacheq (speakers of Tamasheq), nomads of the desert. His poems speak of the desert, a space swarming with life, palpitating like the heart of planet, the richness of its silence and the force of its people. He comments on our Western world and on our fears.
