= 2017 in Mali =

- Decades: 1990s; 2000s; 2010s; 2020s
- See also: History of Mali; List of years in Mali

This article lists events from the year 2017 in Mali

== Incumbents ==
- President – Ibrahim Boubacar Keïta
- Prime Minister – Modibo Keita (until April 9); Abdoulaye Idrissa Maïga (from April 10)

== Events ==
- 18 January – 77 people were killed in the 2017 Gao bombing, the deadliest terrorist attack in Malian history.
- 18 June – June 2017 Bamako attack
- Date unknown – Two U.S. Navy SEALs and two Marines are accused of murdering U.S. Army Green Beret Logan Melgar while serving on an undisclosed mission in Mali.

== Links ==
Media related to 2017 in Mali at Wikimedia Commons
