= Siaka Toumani Sangaré =

Malian civil servant and politician (1955–2024)

President of the Independent National Electoral Commission of Guinea
- In office 19 October 2010 – 3 August 2011
- Preceded by: Ben Sékou Sylla
- Succeeded by: Louncény Camara

Personal details
- Born: 1955 Sikasso, French Sudan, French West Africa
- Died: 17 November 2024 (aged 69) Bamako, Mali
- Education: École des commissaires de l'air
- Occupation: Civil servant

Siaka Toumani Sangaré (1955 – 17 November 2024) was a Malian civil servant and politician. He notably served as president of the Independent National Electoral Commissions of Guinea and Togo.

== Life and career ==
Born in Sikasso in 1955, Sangaré studied at the École nationale d’Administration in Bamako and the École des commissaires de l'air. He became an administrator in the Malian Air Force and served as a chief quartermaster during wars in Mali and Burkina Faso. He then served as a general delegate during the July 1997 Malian parliamentary election and joined the nation's General Directorate for Elections. He often worked as an election observer for various ECOWAS states such as Benin, the Democratic Republic of the Congo, Mauritania, and Togo. He gained attention from the international community for his work during the 2010 Guinean presidential election as president of the Independent National Electoral Commission. In 2015, he was appointed President of the Independent National Electoral Commission of Togo under the banner of the Organisation internationale de la Francophonie. He participated in the preparations for the 2018 Malagasy presidential election and led an audit of the voter rolls in the Democratic Republic of the Congo.

Sangaré died in Bamako on 17 November 2024, at the age of 69.

== Work ==
- Du fusil aux urnes
