= Sophie Pétronin =

French-Swiss humanitarian worker

Maryam Pétronin
- Born: 7 July 1945 (age 81); Bordeaux, France
- Occupations: humanitarian aid worker, nutritionist

Maryam Pétronin (born Sophie Pétronin; 7 July 1945) is a French-Swiss humanitarian aid worker and nutritionist. She is the founder and director of "Aide à Gao" (Help for Gao), a Swiss non-governmental relief organization that assists children suffering from malnutrition. While working in Gao in 2016, she was abducted by Jama'at Nasr al-Islam wal Muslimin, the official branch of Al-Qaeda in Mali. Following her disappearance, the Ministère Public and the General Directorate for Internal Security opened an investigation. She appeared in multiple videos released by her captors, pleading her son and French government for help. She was released in October 2020, alongside Malian opposition leader Soumaila Cisse and two Italian citizens, after being held hostage for 1,381 days. She converted to Islam in 2002, year when she adopted a local girl, Zeinabou and returned to Mali in March 2021 for which she was heavily criticised given the efforts made for her release.

Pétronin revealed that Béatrice Stöckli, a Swiss Christian missionary who had been held hostage alongside her, was killed earlier that year by the terrorist organization.

== Early life ==
Pétronin was born on 7 July 1945 in Bordeaux, France. She trained as a laboratory assistant and completed medical training in specialized issues including malnutrition and tropical medicine.

== Career ==
She settled in Gao, Mali, in 2001, and opened Aide a Gao, a Swiss non-governmental organization who helps children suffering from malnutrition, in 2004. She serves as the director of Aide à Gao. Through her charity, she founded an orphanage. In 2013, she wrote a book titled Le fil de lumière, which details her experiences working in Africa.

== Abduction ==
In 2012, members of the National Movement for the Liberation of Azawad attacked towns throughout Mali, including Gao, following the 2012 Malian coup d'état and Tuareg Rebellion that overthrew President Amadou Toumani Touré. Pétronin took refuge in the Algerian consulate, and escaped through a back door when the Tuareg rebels captured the Algerian diplomats. She left the country and returned the following year.

Pétronin was abducted on 24 December 2016 while working in the Gao region in Mali. Three heavily armed men in a pickup truck reportedly took her from the orphanage she founded. An investigation was opened by the Ministère Public in Paris and entrusted to the General Directorate for Internal Security. Seven months after her disappearance, in July 2017, she appeared in a video posted by al-Qaeda in the Islamic Maghreb alongside five other hostages: Sister Gloria Cecilia Narváez Argoti from Colombia (who was released on 9 October 2021 and met with Pope Francis), Béatrice Stöckli from Switzerland, Arthur Kenneth Elliott from Australia, Stephen McGown from South Africa, and Iulian Ghergut from Romania. Jama'at Nasr al-Islam wal Muslimin, a jihadist militant group and the official Mali branch of Al-Qaeda, claimed responsibility for the kidnapping. Pétronin appeared in a second video released in March 2018. In a third video, released in June 2018, Pétronin addressed her son directly, and the French government. In November 2018 another video was sent to her family in which she did not appear directly but a photograph of her was shown. She was reportedly being held near Tessalit. Her kidnappers had accused her of "religious proselytism".

Pétronin's son, Sébastien Chadaud-Pétronin, travelled to Mali in November 2018 to try and hasten the release of his mother, and called on French president Emmanuel Macron to negotiate for her release. He expressed concerns for his mother's health, who was suffering from cancer and malaria at the time of her abduction. Macron responded to Chadaud-Pétronin in December 2018, releasing a statement that read, "The State continues to act relentlessly to find our compatriot. Such an approach to be successful requires professionalism and discretion". Chadaud-Pétronin was supported in his campaign to free his mother by his cousin, Arnaud Granouillac, and Colombian politician Íngrid Betancourt, who had been held hostage in Colombia from 2002 to 2008.

=== Conversion to Islam ===
She was eventually released in exchange for 200 Malian hostages. France thought it was a good deal, but it was because it did not know about Pétronin's situation, who had secretly become a Muslim; her new name is Maryam. The news spread when she arrived at the airport in Paris, and Macron rapidly canceled his speech. It was the first time in French Republic’s History that the president did not pronounce his speech after such event. He left silently, ashamed of the scandal he had provoked. "While traditionally the head of state speaks after a hostage release, Emmanuel Macron canceled his speech before leaving Villacoublay." Sophie had left behind an adopted daughter in Mali.

At the surprise of the media, during interviews, Pétronin seemed fine and at peace with herself. She even declared that she has only returned to France to visit her son, take a trip to Switzerland, and then she will soon return to Mali to “see if everything is okay.” She said of her Al-Qaeda kidnappers "I was always respected, they took care of me. They brought me a doctor when I was sick. He came back to see me several times."

Pétronin finally managed to return to Mali, though clandestinely. She had tried numerous times to obtain a visa to return, but the French authorities strongly opposed it to avoid any controversy.

=== Release ===
Pétronin was released in October 2020, after 1,381 days in captivity, alongside Malian opposition leader Soumaila Cisse and two Italians citizens, a Catholic priest named Father Pierluigi Maccalli, and Nicola Chiacchio. Pétronin's release was part of an exchange with the militant group, in which Mali freed more than 100 suspected or convicted jihadists as part of the negotiations for her freedom. At the time of her release, she had been the last French citizen to be held hostage in the world. The Malian president released a statement stating, "The presidency of the Republic confirms the liberation of Mr. Soumaïla Cissé and Ms. Sophie Pétronin. The former hostages are en route for Bamako". The French president released a statement voicing "immense relief" at Pétronin's release.

She was taken to the French Embassy in Bamako, where she told reporters that she had "transformed detention into a spiritual retreat" and "prayed a lot". She arrived back in France in October 2020 and was greeted at Vélizy – Villacoublay Air Base by President Macron. She revealed that one of her fellow hostages, Swiss Christian missionary Béatrice Stöckli, was killed during their captivity. Despite being abducted and held hostage, Pétronin stated that she wished to return to Mali to continue her charity work after spending time back home in France and Switzerland.

== Personal life ==
Pétronin is a dual citizen of France and Switzerland. She is married to Jean-Pierre Chadaud and they have two children. She converted to Islam in 2002, year she adopted a local girl, Zeinabou. In a press conference she stated, "For Mali, I will pray, to implore Allah's blessings and mercy, because I am a Muslim. You say Sophie, but you have Mariam in front of you".

== Return to Mali ==
In 2021, Pétronin returned to Mali via Senegal without following standard formalities, thus avoiding the pressure being exercised by French authorities who attempted to stop her from getting a visa. She lived in Bamako for seven months, before local officials launched a search for her. Pétronin went back to Mali in March 2021 to be with her adopted daughter. After her repeated visa requests were refused by Mali, she went to Senegal, and then overland to Mali. Government Spokesman Gabriel Attal deplored her "irresponsibility" in returning to Mali, given that French soldiers had been killed in rescue operations. Malian officials are searching for her and under orders to escort her to the national police.

== See also ==
- List of kidnappings
- List of solved missing person cases (post-2000)
