= Adama Kouyaté =

Malian photographer (1928–2020)

- Born: 1928; Bougouni, French West Africa
- Died: 14 February 2020 (aged 92)
- Occupation: Photographer

Adama Kouyaté (1928 – 14 February 2020) was a Malian photographer.

== Biography ==
In 1944, Kouyaté went to Bamako to look for a job. He entered the Photo Hall Soudanais, the first photographic studio in Mali, and subsequently founded the Photo Hall Kati, near Bamako. In 1964, he went to Ouagadougou and opened the Photo Hall Voltaïque before returning to Mali four years later, to the city of Ségou. Throughout his career, Kouyaté captured the atmosphere of Malian society shortly after independence.

Kouyaté died on 14 February 2020 at the age of 92.

== Exhibitions ==
- La Librairie Photographique, Paris (2011)
- "Photographing the Social Body: Malian Portraiture from the Studio to the Street", Perlman Teaching Museum, Northfield, Minnesota
