= Independent National Electoral Commission (Guinea) =

The Independent National Electoral Commission (French: Commission Electorale Nationale Indépendante, CENI) was the election commission in Guinea. The body was established in November 2007. It was replaced by the General Directorate of Elections in June 2025 by the dictator Mamady Doumbouya.
