= Béatrice Stöckli =

Swiss Christian missionary (died 2020)

Béatrice Stöckli (died 9 October 2020) was a Swiss Christian missionary. She was killed in 2020 after having been taken hostage by the Islamic militant group Jama'at Nasr al-Islam wal Muslimin, a branch of Al-Qaeda in Mali.

== Biography ==
Stöckli was from Basel. She worked as an Evangelical Christian missionary in Mali. Stöckli was kidnapped in April 2012, after being in Mali for ten years, by an Islamic extremist group. She was later released under the terms that she not return to Mali. She returned, and was kidnapped again in 2016 by Jama'at Nasr al-Islam wal Muslimin, the official branch of Al-Qaeda in Mali, while working in Timbuktu. In July 2017 she appeared in a video released by the terrorist group, wearing a black headscarf, and was identified as "Beatrice S."

On 9 October 2020 French authorities notified the Swiss Federal Government that a Swiss hostage in Mali was killed by Jama'at Nasr al-Islam wal Muslimin, after her death was confirmed by fellow hostage Sophie Pétronin. Her death was confirmed by the Federal Department of Foreign Affairs. Ignazio Cassis, the Head of the Federal Department of Foreign Affairs, released a statement saying "It was with great sadness that I learned of the death of our fellow citizen. I condemn this cruel act and express my deepest sympathy to the relatives."

Stöckli's remains were recovered in March 2021.

== See also ==
- List of kidnappings
- List of solved missing person cases (post-2000)
