= Mahamadou Djeri Maïga =

Malian politician

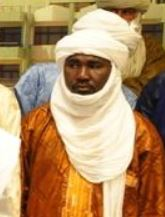
- Maïga in Ouagadougou in 2012

Vice-President of the Transitional Council of the State of Azawad
- In office 6 April 2012 – 12 July 2012
- President: Bilal Ag Acherif
- Preceded by: Position Established
- Succeeded by: Position Abolished

Personal details
- Born: c. 1972
- Died: 22 October 2018 (aged 45–46)

Mahamadou Djeri Maïga (alias Mohamed Jerry Maïga or Mahamadou Maiga Djeri; c. 1972 – 22 October 2018) was a Malian politician. He was the Vice-President of the Transitional Council of the State of Azawad, established by the National Movement for the Liberation of Azawad (MNLA). After the MNLA lost the control of Northern Mali to Islamist groups, he fled to Niger. Mr Djeri Mahamadou Maïga belonged to the Songhai ethnic group, one of the dominant ethnic groups in northern Mali. Mr. Djeri's position in the movement symbolized the inclusion of other ethnic groups in the fight for self-determination hitherto the reserve of the Tuaregs.
