= COVID-19 pandemic in Mali =

- Disease: COVID-19
- Pathogen: SARS-CoV-2
- Location: Mali
- First outbreak: Wuhan, China
- Index case: Bamako, Kayes
- Arrival date: 25 March 2020 (6 years, 7 months and 3 days)
- Confirmed cases: 33,236 (updated 18 September 2026)
- Deaths: 743 (updated 18 September 2026)

The COVID-19 pandemic in Mali is part of the worldwide pandemic of coronavirus disease 2019 (COVID-19) caused by severe acute respiratory syndrome coronavirus 2 (SARS-CoV-2). The virus was confirmed to have reached Mali in March 2020.

== Background ==
On 12 January 2020, the World Health Organization (WHO) confirmed that a novel coronavirus was the cause of a respiratory illness in a cluster of people in Wuhan, Hubei, China, which was reported to the WHO on 31 December 2019.

The case fatality ratio for COVID-19 has been much lower than SARS of 2003, but the transmission has been significantly greater, with a significant total death toll. Model-based simulations for Mali suggest that the 95% confidence interval for the time-varying reproduction number R_{t} has been stable below 1.0 since December 2020.

== Timeline ==
=== March 2020 ===
- On 25 March, Mali confirmed its first two COVID-19 cases.
- On 26 March, two new cases were registered by the Ministry of Health and Social Affairs. To address the epidemic which had so far spared the country, in an address to the nation, Ibrahim Boubacar Kéïta, the President of the Republic of Mali declared a state of emergency and instituted a curfew from 9.00 p.m. to 5:00 a.m.
- On 27 March, 7 new positive tests for Coronavirus: Mali rose to 11 cases.
- On 28 March, 7 new cases were confirmed, the total rose to 18. The first COVID-19 death occurred.
- On 31 March, 25 persons had tested positive and there had been 2 deaths according to health authorities.

=== Subsequent cases ===
- 2020 cases

There were 7,029 confirmed cases in 2020. 4,548 patients recovered while 269 persons died. At the end of 2020 there were 2,212 active cases.

- 2021 cases

Mass vaccination started on 31 March, initially with 396,000 doses of the Covishield vaccine provided through the COVAX facility.

There were 13,979 confirmed cases in 2021, bringing the total number of cases to 21,008. 14,187 patients recovered in 2021 while 391 persons died, bringing the total death toll to 660. At the end of 2021 there were 1,031 active cases.

Modeling carried out by WHO’s Regional Office for Africa suggests that due to under-reporting, the true cumulative number of infections by the end of 2021 was around 9 million while the true number of COVID-19 deaths was around 10,650.

- 2022 cases

There were 11,762 confirmed cases in 2022, bringing the total number of cases to 32,770. 13,215 patients recovered in 2022 while 83 persons died, bringing the total death toll to 743. At the end of 2022 there were 77 active cases.

- 2023 cases

There were 394 confirmed cases in 2023, bringing the total number of cases to 33,164. 382 patients recovered in 2023. The death toll remained unchanged. At the end of 2023 there were 89 active cases.

== Statistics ==
=== Confirmed new cases per day ===
View source data.

=== Confirmed deaths per day ===
View source data.

== Preventive measures ==
On 18 March, President Ibrahim Boubacar Keita suspended flights from affected countries, closed schools and banned large public gatherings. However planned elections in March–April, which had already been postponed several times for the poor security situation in the country, went ahead as planned.

== See also ==
- COVID-19 pandemic in Africa
- COVID-19 pandemic by country and territory
- 2020 in Mali
- 2020 in West Africa
