= Tessalit =

- Commune and village
- Location in Mali
- Coordinates: 20°12′04″N 1°0′45″E
- Country: Mali
- Region: Kidal Region
- Cercle: Tessalit Cercle

Government
  - Control: Azawad Liberation Front; Jama'at Nusrat al-Islam wal-Muslimin

Area
  - Total: 30,000 km^{2} (12,000 sq mi)

Population (2009)
  - Total: 5,739
- Time zone: UTC+0 (GMT)

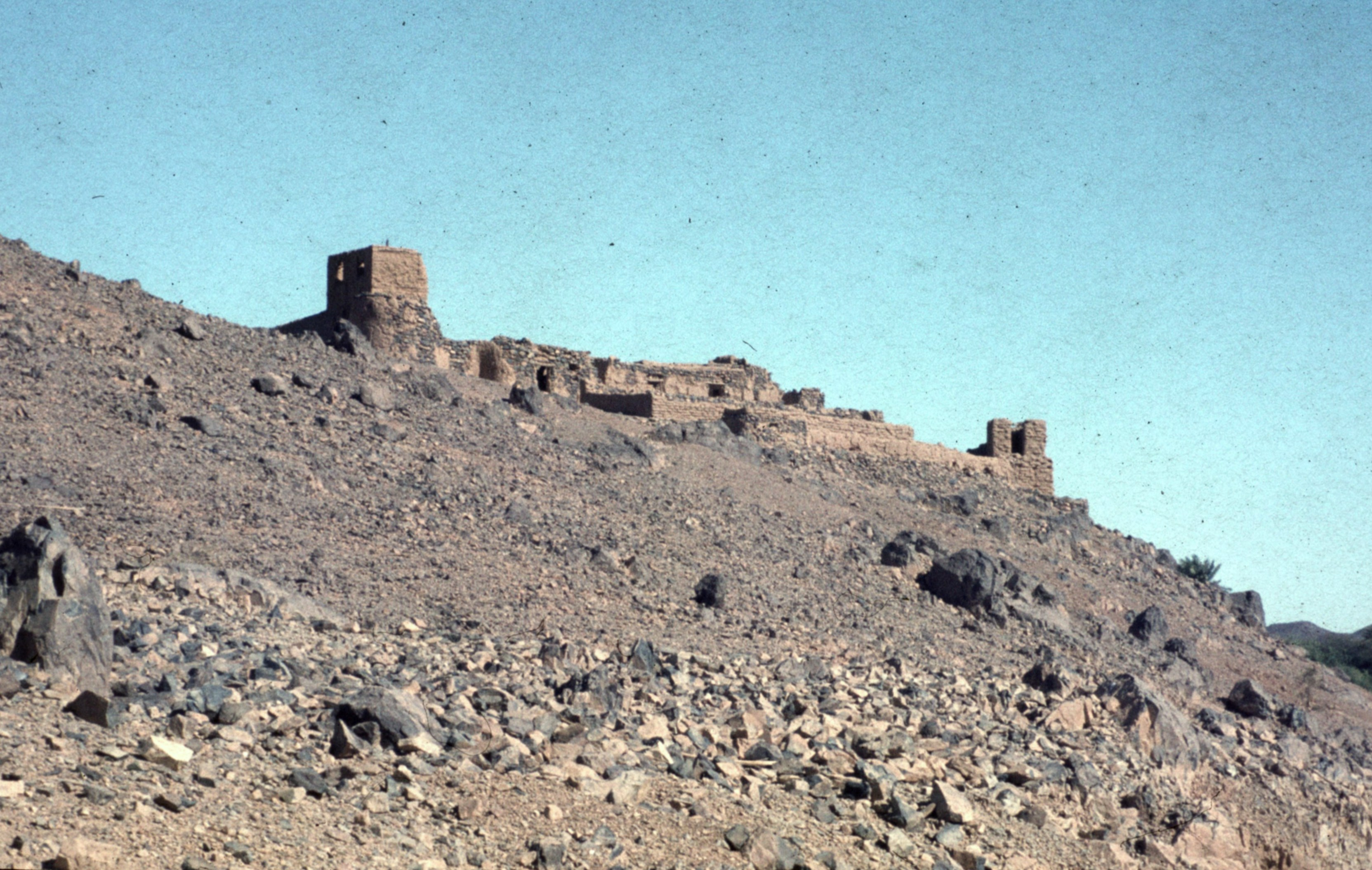
Fortress

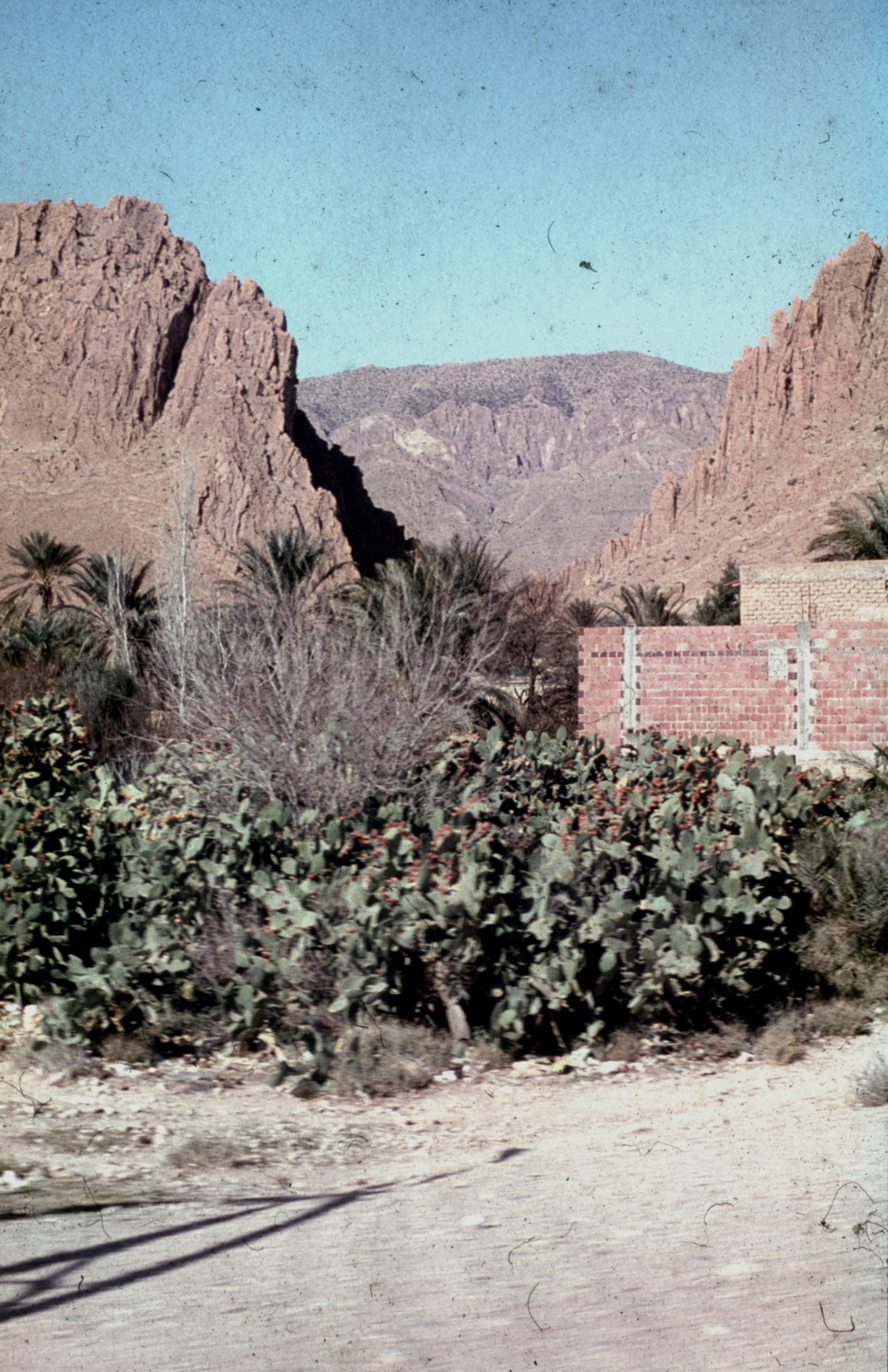
Well

Tessalit is a rural commune and village in the Kidal Region of Mali. The village is the administrative centre of Tessalit Cercle (district). The village lies 85 kilometres (53 mi) north of Adjelhoc and about 70 kilometres (43 mi) from the Algerian border. The commune extends over an area of 30,000 square kilometres (12,000 sq mi) that is almost entirely desert. In the 2009 census the commune had a population of 5,739. It is currently under FLA and JNIM control, following the 2026 Mali offensives.

It is served by Tessalit Airport.

Tessalit is an oasis in the Sahara desert and a stop for trans-Saharan travellers. A gypsum deposit and a plaster factory also contribute to the local economy, though these activities have been disrupted in recent decades by the Tuareg Rebellions and terrorism in neighboring Algeria.

The Malian government have a military base at the village of Tessalit. Which was captured by JNIM and the FLA on May 1, 2026.

Tessalit is situated in the mountain range of Adrar des Ifoghas. It is primarily populated by Tuaregs and is the home of the musical group Tinariwen as well as the poet Souéloum Diagho. The village is twinned with Saint-Jean-de-Maurienne, France.

The cercle of Tessalit contains the communes of Tessalit, Adjelhoc, and Timtaghene.

== During the Mali War ==
2010s

Tuareg rebels defeated Malian government forces to take the village in 2012. Attempts by the Malian Air Force, using Ukrainian mercenaries, were unable to prevent the defeat.

French paratroopers took the local airport and then were joined by French and African Forces landing at the airport. They recaptured Tessalit on Feb. 8, 2013, according to General Staff spokesman Colonel Thierry Burkhard.

=== 2020s ===
French forces killed the head of Al-Qaeda in the Islamic Maghreb (AQIM), Abdelmalek Droukdel on June 5, 2020, near Tessalit. While France is concentrating its anti-terrorist efforts on the Islamic State in the Greater Sahara (IS-GS), a spokesperson indicated that does not preclude other activities. Droukdel was buried at the scene.

On May 1, 2026, the village was captured by the FLA and JNIM as part of the 2026 Mali offensives.

== Climate ==
Climate data for Tessalit, Mali (1961-1990 normals, extremes 1948-1994)
Month	Jan	Feb	Mar	Apr	May	Jun	Jul	Aug	Sep	Oct	Nov	Dec	Year
Record high °C (°F)	36.0 (96.8)	39.0 (102.2)	42.5 (108.5)	44.0 (111.2)	46.4 (115.5)	46.3 (115.3)	49.0 (120.2)	45.0 (113.0)	44.5 (112.1)	43.4 (110.1)	39.0 (102.2)	35.6 (96.1)	49.0 (120.2)
Mean daily maximum °C (°F)	26.8 (80.2)	29.9 (85.8)	33.3 (91.9)	37.0 (98.6)	40.7 (105.3)	42.7 (108.9)	41.6 (106.9)	40.6 (105.1)	40.3 (104.5)	37.3 (99.1)	31.9 (89.4)	27.1 (80.8)	35.8 (96.4)
Daily mean °C (°F)	19.7 (67.5)	22.5 (72.5)	25.7 (78.3)	29.4 (84.9)	33.3 (91.9)	35.8 (96.4)	34.9 (94.8)	33.9 (93.0)	33.5 (92.3)	30.5 (86.9)	25.1 (77.2)	20.3 (68.5)	28.7 (83.7)
Mean daily minimum °C (°F)	12.6 (54.7)	15.0 (59.0)	18.0 (64.4)	21.8 (71.2)	25.8 (78.4)	28.9 (84.0)	28.1 (82.6)	27.1 (80.8)	26.7 (80.1)	23.6 (74.5)	18.2 (64.8)	13.5 (56.3)	21.6 (70.9)
Record low °C (°F)	3.3 (37.9)	4.4 (39.9)	7.0 (44.6)	8.7 (47.7)	12.1 (53.8)	18.4 (65.1)	16.0 (60.8)	14.0 (57.2)	12.9 (55.2)	9.0 (48.2)	6.3 (43.3)	3.3 (37.9)	3.3 (37.9)
Average precipitation mm (inches)	0.4 (0.02)	0.1 (0.00)	0.7 (0.03)	0.5 (0.02)	4.6 (0.18)	6.1 (0.24)	16.6 (0.65)	26.1 (1.03)	11.6 (0.46)	1.1 (0.04)	0.3 (0.01)	0.4 (0.02)	68.5 (2.7)
Average rainy days	0.2	0.1	0.2	0.2	0.7	1.2	3.3	5.1	2.5	0.4	0.2	0.2	14.3
Average relative humidity (%)	23	19	17	14	15	18	26	33	24	19	22	21	21
Mean monthly sunshine hours	253.4	248.6	259.3	255.1	271.3	166.2	139.5	154.0	148.6	264.7	262.3	238.8	2,661.8
Percentage possible sunshine	75	78	70	68	68	42	34	39	41	74	79	71	61
Source 1: NOAA
Source 2: DWD (extremes, humidity 1973-1994)

== Notable people ==
- Mohamed Ag Erlaf (born 1956) - politician
