= Aguelhok =

- Commune and town
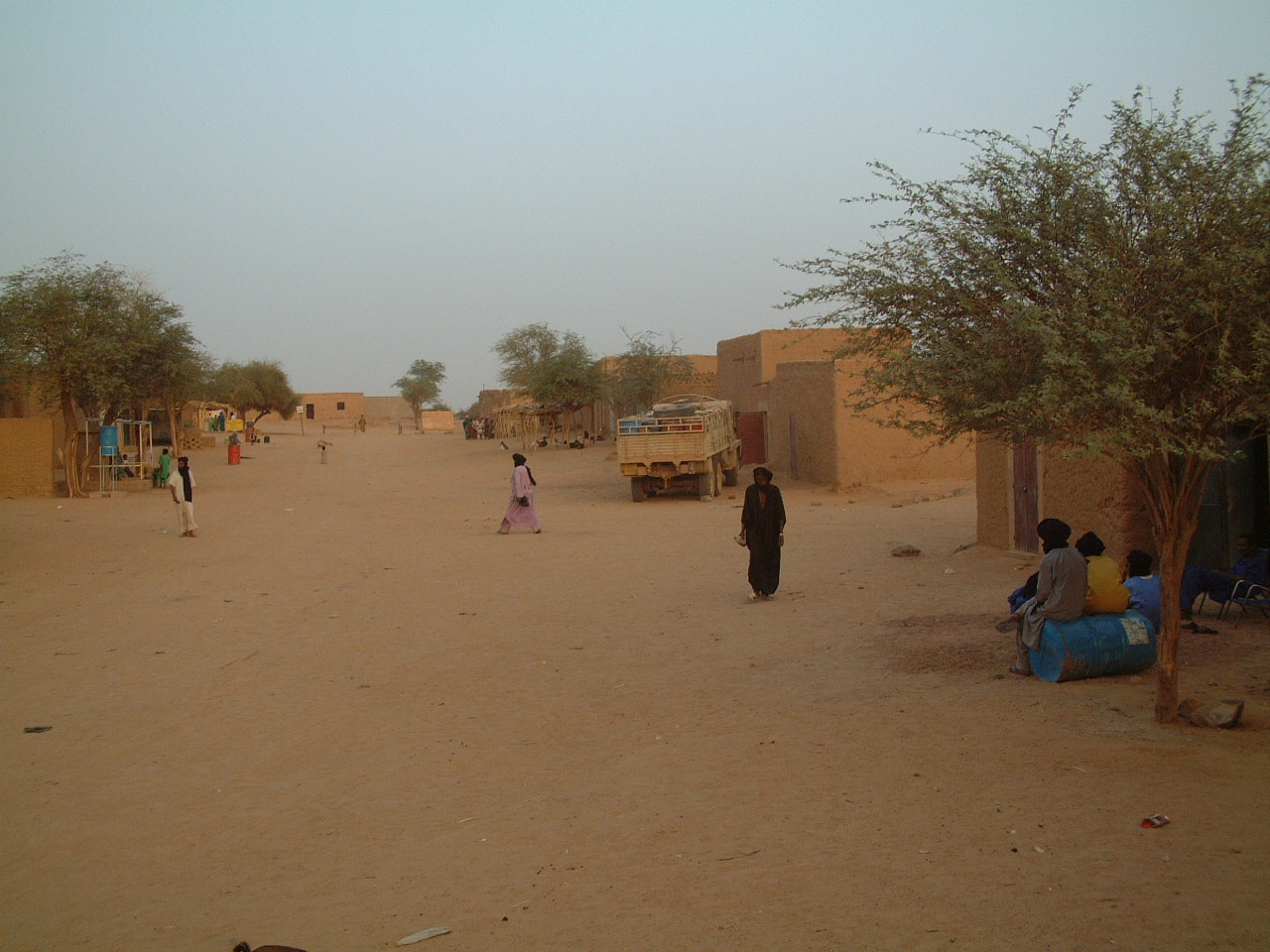
- A road in Aguelhok

- Location in Mali
- Coordinates: 19.465°N 0.856°E
- Country: Mali
- County: Kidal Region

Area
  - Total: 22,000 km^{2} (8,500 sq mi)

Population (2009)
  - Total: 8,080
  - Density: 0.37/km^{2} (0.95/sq mi)

Aguelhok, also known as Adjelhoc (the official name), is a rural commune and village in the Kidal Region of eastern Mali in the Tessalit Cercle. In the census of 2009 the commune had a population of 8,080.

== Geography ==
Adjelhoc is situated in the north of the Tilemsi Valley. Located in the sandstone massif of the Adrar des Ifoghas, Adjelhoc lies 430 km north of Gao and 150 km south of the Algerian border, in open desert.

The area of the commune is approximately 22,000 km^{2}, about the size of Belize.

The population is 95% Tuareg. The majority have a nomadic lifestyle.

== History ==
In January 2012, the Islamist group Ansar Dine captured a military base at Aguelhok from Malian government forces. France accused the group of summarily executing 82 soldiers and following the capture, describing the group's tactics as "Al-Qaeda-style". In all 128-153 soldiers were killed.

On 29 July 2012, Islamists stoned a couple to death for having children outside of marriage. An official reported that many people left the town for Algeria following the incident.

During the 2026 Mali offensives, the commune was attacked and captured by the Azawad Liberation Front, with Africa Corps withdrawing from the area.
