= Women in Mali =

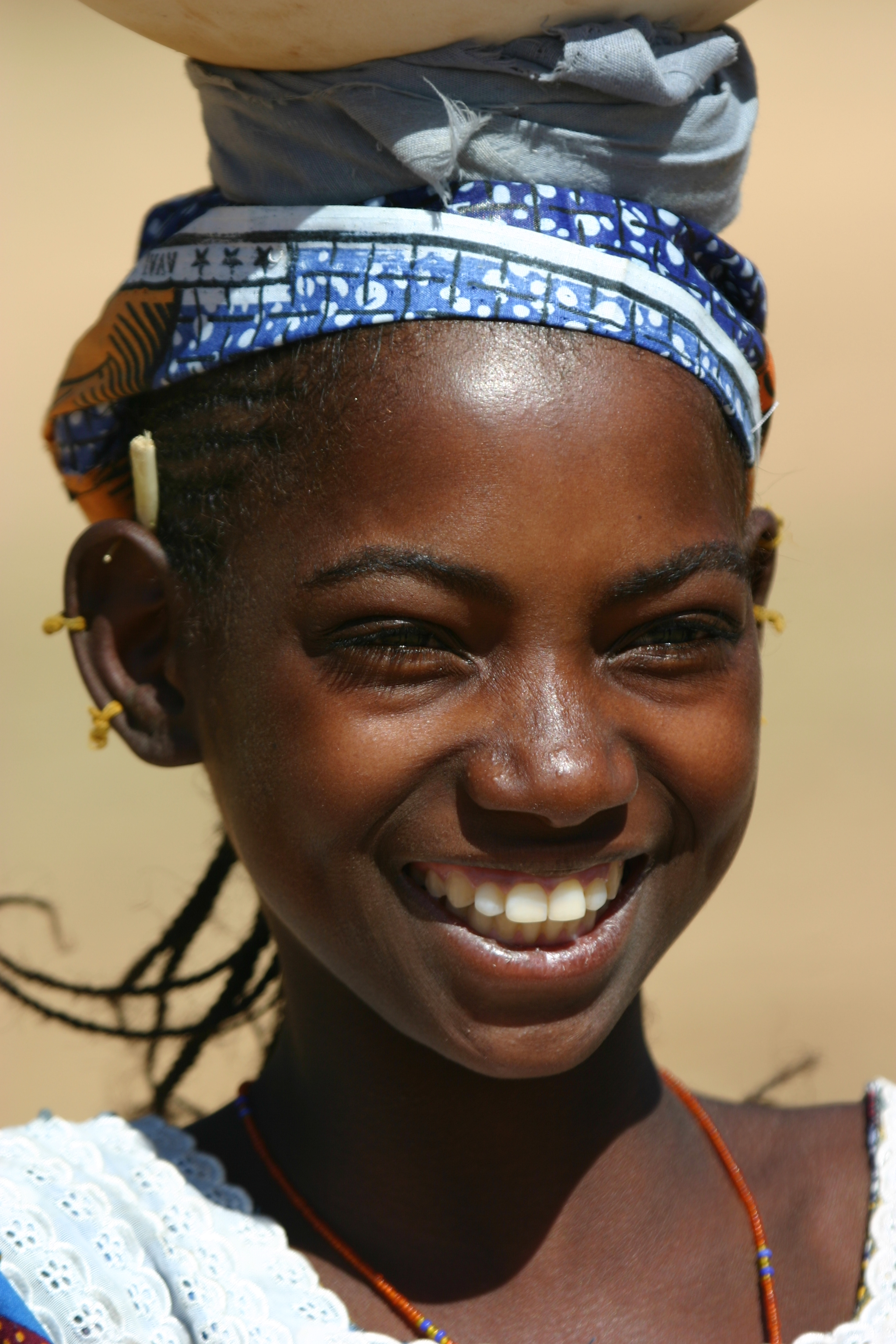
- A Fula girl in Mali

General statistics
- Maternal mortality (per 100,000): 540 (2010)
- Women in parliament: 10.2% (2012)
- Women over 25 with secondary education: 11.3% (2010)
- Women in labour force: 63% (2017)

Gender Inequality Index
- Value: 0.613 (2021)
- Rank: 155th out of 191

Global Gender Gap Index
- Value: 0.601 (2022)
- Rank: 141st out of 146

The status and social roles of women in Mali have been formed by the complex interplay of a variety of traditions in ethnic communities, the rise and fall of the great Sahelien states, French colonial rule, independence, urbanisation, and postcolonial conflict and progress. Forming just less than half Mali's population, Malian women have sometimes been the center of matrilineal societies, but have always been crucial to the economic and social structure of this largely rural, agricultural society.

In addition, their role has been shaped by the conflicts over religion, as animist societies gave way gradually to Islam in the 1100–1900 period. In recent years, the rise of religious fundamentalism has posed a threat to women's wellbeing.

"One of the best things in [the Kingdom of Mali] is, the regard they pay to justice; for, in this respect, the Sultan regards neither little nor much. The safety, too, is very great; so that a traveler may proceed alone among them, without the least fear of a thief or robber. Another of their good properties is, that when a merchant happens to die among them, they will make no effort to get possession of his property, but will allow the lawful successors to it to take it. Another is, their constant custom of attending prayers with the congregation; for, unless one makes haste, he will find no place left to say his prayers in. Another is, their insisting on the Koran's being committed to memory: for if a man finds his son defective in this, he will confine him till he is quite perfect, nor will he allow him his liberty until he is so. As to their bad practices, they will exhibit their little daughters, as well as their male and female slaves, quite naked. In the same manner will the women enter into the presence of the King, which his own daughters will also do. Nor do the free women ever clothe themselves till after marriage. The greatest part of them will eat stinking dead bodies, dogs and donkeys."

—The Travels of Ibn Battuta, c. 1320s, translated by Samuel Lee, 1829

Contemporary problems faced by women in Mali include high rate of violence against women, child marriage and female genital mutilation.

== Cultural background ==
Mali is a landlocked country in West Africa. It obtained independence from France in 1960. The Northern Mali conflict has destabilized the country. Mali has more than 24 million inhabitants, and it is ethnically diverse being formed of the following groups: Bambara 34.1%, Fulani (Peul) 14.7%, Sarakole 10.8%, Senufo 10.5%, Dogon 8.9%, Malinke 8.7%, Bobo 2.9%, Songhai 1.6%, Tuareg 0.9%, other Malian 6.1%, from member of Economic Community of West African States 0.3%, other 0.4%. The vast majority of the population follows Islam. The urbanization is 42.4%. The fertility rate is almost 6 children born/woman, one of the highest in the world.

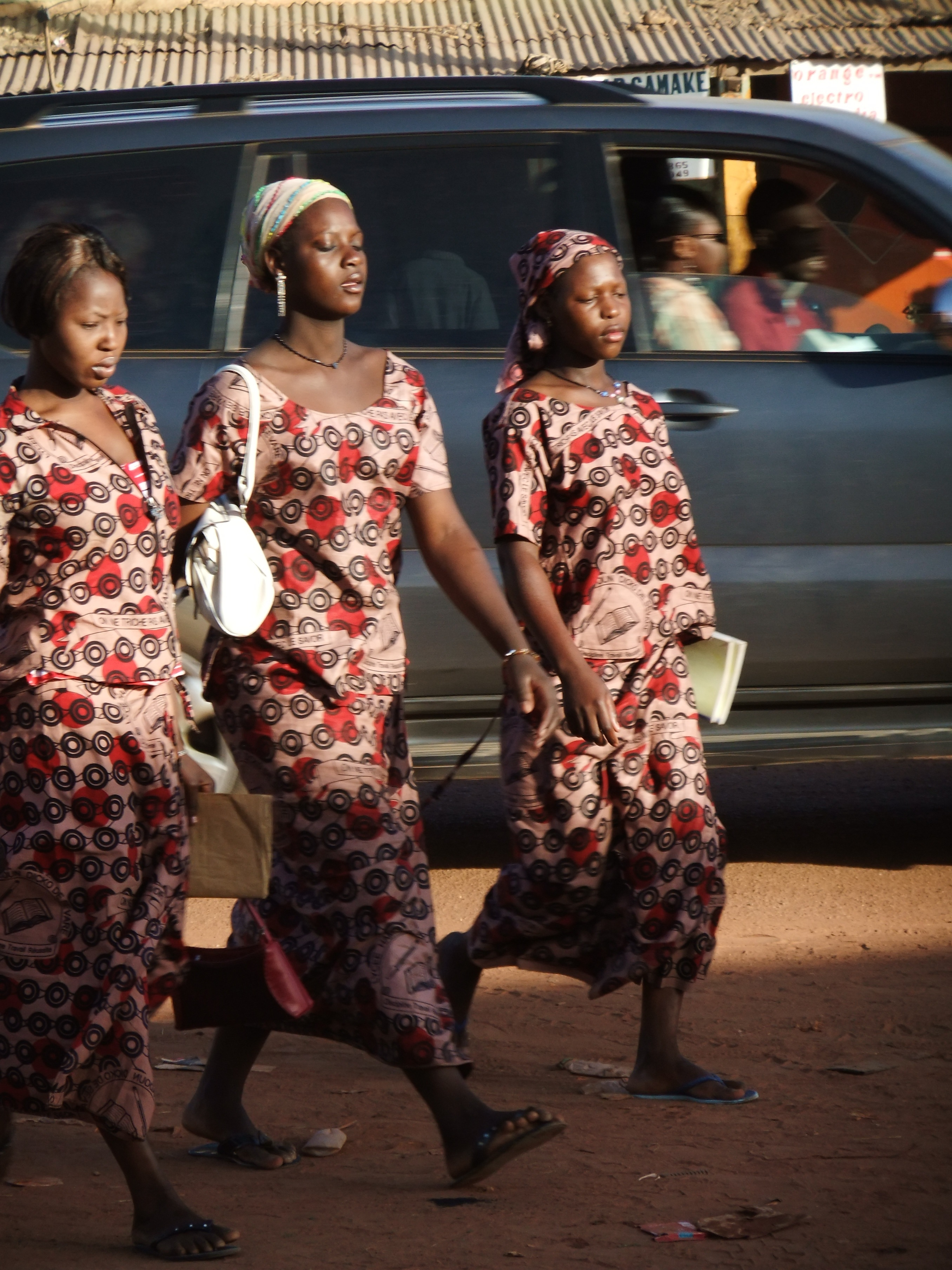
Malian girls going to school

== Education ==
Education is compulsory from ages six to 15. However, many children do not attend school, and girls' enrollment is lower than that of boys at all levels due to factors such as poverty, societal preference to educate boys, child marriage and sexual harassment. In Malian households, the sons help with family farms, enterprises, and market purchases. They are in charge of all the major decision-making. Malian men are expected to acquire resources and earn the family income. The daughters quickly begin doing domestic chores and caring for younger siblings. Women are expected to handle the household chores and tend to garden plots. In polygamous households, women share and split up their tasks.

It is common for Malian parents to take their daughters out of school for early marriage and fear of pregnancy. There is a prevailing notion that women in Mali will engage in adultery. Farming households typically keep their daughters out of schools to help with agricultural labor. Some families also fear that educated women are less likely to participate in arranged marriages and worry those women will know how to file for divorce. Additionally, women are not expected to send money back to their parents. Therefore, education is not viewed as equally important for women as it is for men in Mali. Once married, women are seen as the 'property' of their husbands. In 1949, Malian girls only made up 21% of students enrolled in primary school.

Mali's democratization in 1991 improved access to education. Following the transition, girls in Mali's net enrollment in educational institutions increased by 27% by 2004 (16% to 43%). However, primary school completion rates for girls and boys are 40% and 60% respectively. Only 6% of girls enroll in secondary education. Women's literacy rate (aged 15 and over) is significantly lower than that of men: female 22.2%, compared to male 45.1% (2015 est.).

== Health care ==
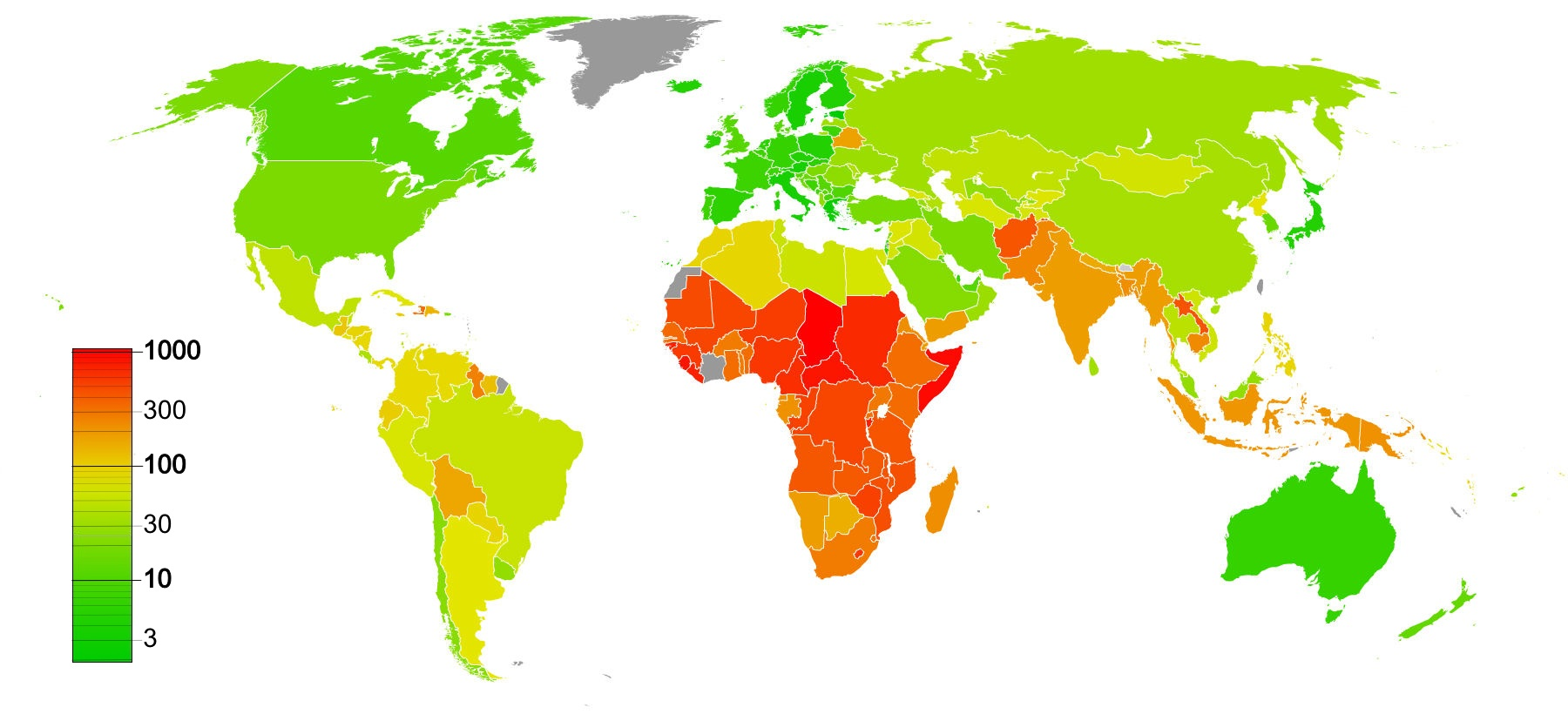
Maternal mortality map, 2012

Infant mortality rates, under age 1, in 2013

Mali is one of the world's poorest nations and is severely affected by poor health and sanitation. Women's health is negatively impacted, although the government provides subsidised medical care to children as well as adults of both sexes. The Constitution of Mali guarantees the right to health. Healthcare is free for pregnant women and children up to the age of 12. The healthcare policy is based on community involvement, cost recovery and the availability of essential medicines, and it is developed by the Ministry of Health and implemented by the National Health Directorate. In Mali, maternal mortality and infant mortality are very high. Studies conducted by UNICEF have shown that out of 1200 women who get pregnant each day, 230 experience complications and 20 die. Early marriage, lack of family planning, very high fertility, and female genital mutilation contribute to women's ill health.

Malian healthcare has improved drastically over the last fifteen years. This conclusion is drawn from improvements in child mortality rate (237% to 191%) and maternal mortality rate (582 per 100000 to 464 per 100000) between 1996 and 2006. However, life expectancy remains at 48 years old and approximately 1 in 5 children die before the age of five.

There are discrepancies between rural and urban physicians. Less than 10% of Malian physicians are based in rural areas. Rural physicians have less access to technology like echographs and laboratories. These physicians typically work in community health centres and the family physicians are employed by religious/associative providers. Families living in urban areas have taken up more family planning methods whereas rural families are reluctant. In such spaces children are regarded as gifts of Allah. The healthcare providers in rural areas do not give women contraceptives without their husband's permission. The village centers are generally cheap and most Malian babies are delivered there. Urban areas have private practices and hospitals that are their main medical providers. The practices usually have two full-time physicians and hospitals have five. There is a prevailing issue of weak cooperation between the private and public medical sectors in Mali.

== Marriage ==
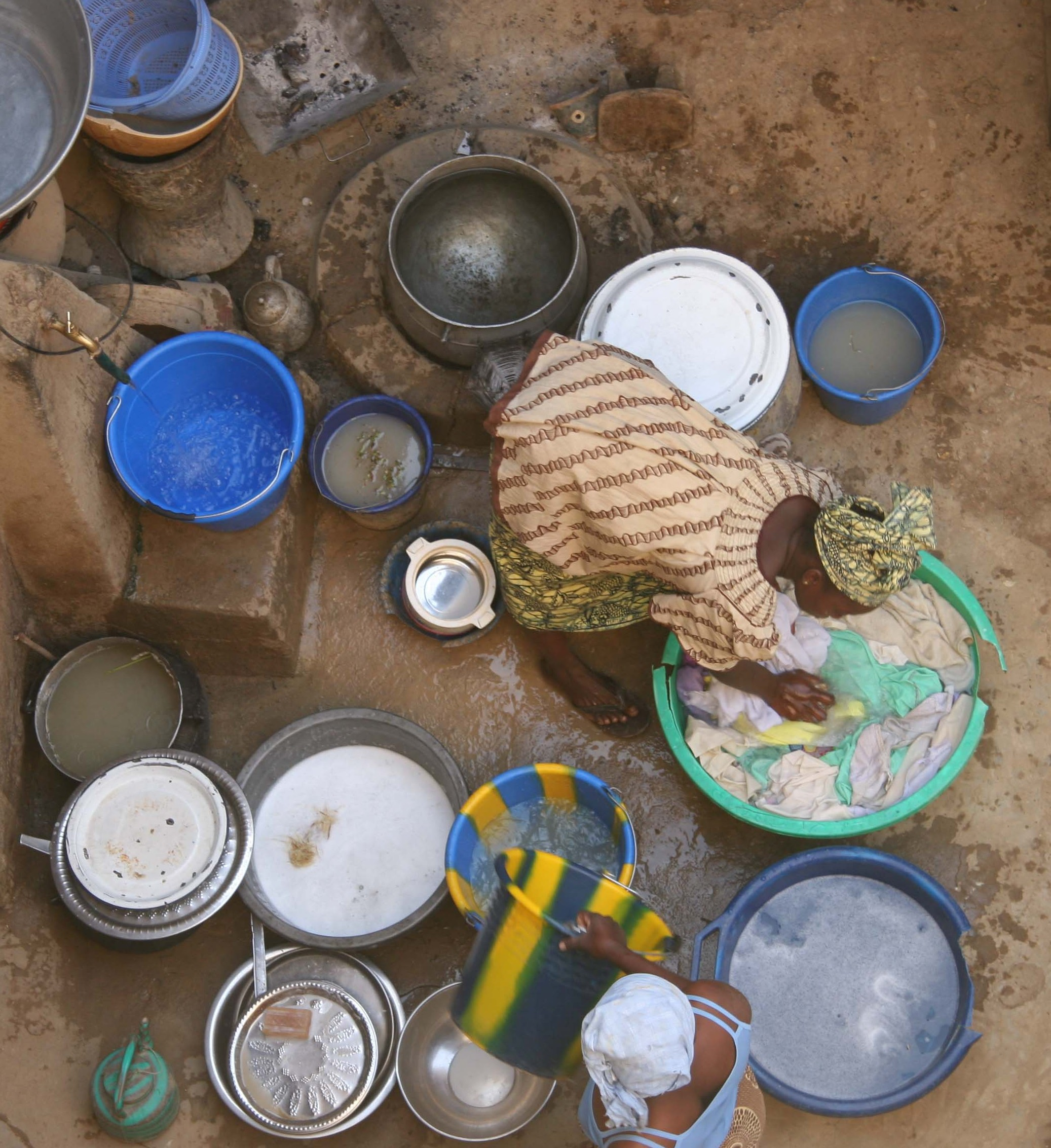
Women washing clothes in Djenné, Mali. Marriage in Mali often includes the acceptance of traditional labour roles, in this case, caring for the home.

Child marriage is common in Mali, fueled by lax laws, and lack of enforcement of even the existing laws. The minimum age to marry without parental consent is 16 for girls and 18 for boys. However, this law is not enforced and earlier marriage is typical, especially in rural areas. A 15-year-old girl may marry with parental consent if a civil judge approves. The mean age of marriage for men and women is roughly 26 and 18, respectively. The age gap is attributed to inequalities in bargaining and decision-making power. Men are regarded as the head of the household and women are required by law to obey their husbands. These customs have led to many Malian women experiencing controlling behaviors from their partners (38.18%).

The culture of early marriage in Mali contributes to lesser opportunities for women. The women experience reduced access to education, employment, and independence.

A Malian NGO reported that at least 10 girls-—some below the age of 13—-lost their lives between 2005 and May 2007 because of medical complications resulting from early marriage. In Mali, about 75% of girls up to age 14 and 89% of women age 15-49 are estimated to have undergone female genital mutilation (FGM), a practice which endangers their health.

=== Interpersonal violence (IPV) in Mali ===
Mali's geographical location has some of the highest rates of interpersonal violence (IPV). 49% of Malian women have experienced emotional, physical, or sexual IPV. Mali does not have laws against IPV. Mali has laws that legally bind Malian women to obey their husbands. Interpersonal violence is condoned in Malian society, with 76% of Malian women claiming it is justified in one or more situations.

Generally, polygamous marriages increase the likelihood that women in Mali experience more than one form of interpersonal violence. Polygamous marriages in Mali are reported to have weaker communication where women often experience jealousy and neglect. The need to split resources evenly induces more conflict. The risk factors for IPV are substantially higher in polygamous child marriages and monogamous marriages of older women. The monogamous marriages of older women exacerbate IPV risks because those marriages deviate from cultural norms. A study conducted in 2022 shows that 37.22% of Malian women experienced physical abuse, a 10% increase since 2013. Most women in the study were under 18, middle class, and had no education.

Studies have shown varying results regarding the relationship between women's level of decision making, education, employment, and IPV. Some results show it increases the likelihood of IPV, specifically in women working outside the home, as accomplished women challenge Mali's traditional gender roles. Whereas some studies show decreased IPV as women pursue education and employment.

=== Family law ===
Women do not have equal status and rights, particularly concerning divorce and inheritance. The law allows polygamy. Women are legally obligated to obey their husbands and are particularly vulnerable in cases of divorce, child custody, and inheritance. Even the limited rights that women have are often unenforced, due to lack of education and information, as well as cultural views which consider women as inferior. According to the law, the Ministry for the Promotion of Women, the Family, and Children is responsible for ensuring the legal rights of women.

== Rights of women under law ==
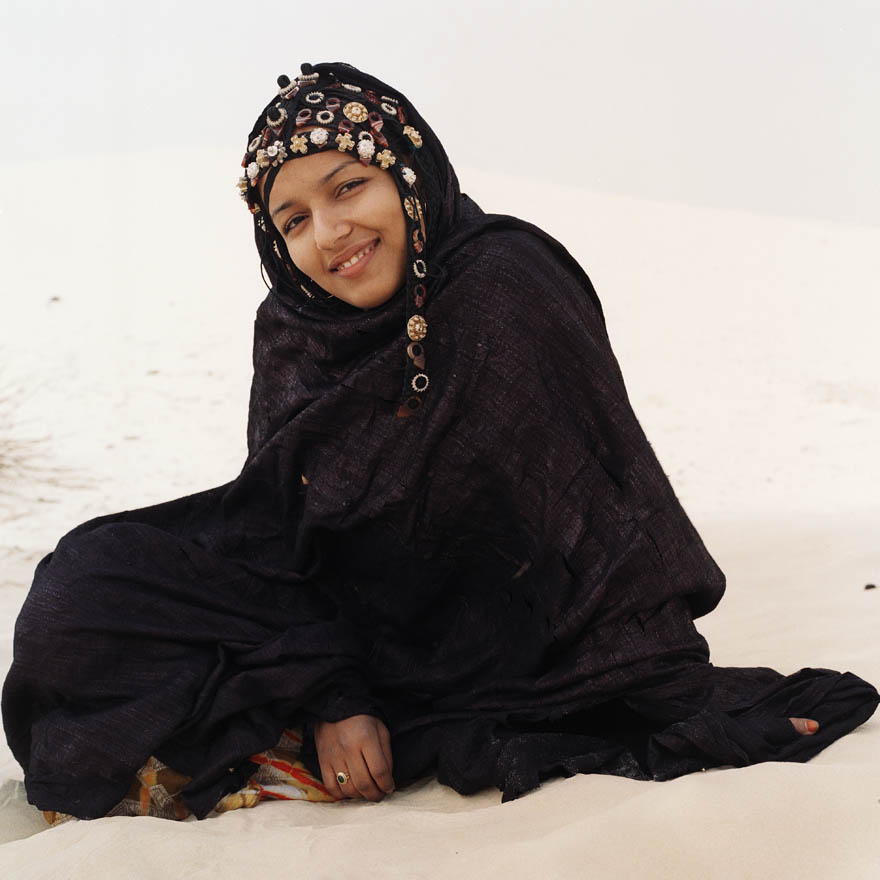
A Tuareg women in northern Mali, 2007.

Article 2 of the Constitution of Mali states that "All Malians are born and live free and equal in their rights and duties. Any discrimination based on social origin, color, language, race, sex, religion, or political opinion is prohibited", while Article 3 states that "No one will be put to torture, nor to inhumane, cruel, degrading, or humiliating treatment".

=== Abuse and exploitation of girls ===
Abuse of girls includes child marriage and female genital mutilation. There are no comprehensive government statistics on child abuse, and the problem is widespread. Child abuse is usually unreported. The police and the social services department in the Ministry of Solidarity and Humanitarian Action have investigated and intervened in some reported cases of child abuse or neglect.

Child marriage is very prevalent in Mali, with a majority of girls being married before 18. There is a very strong link between child marriage and lack of education, as well as polygamy, with child brides being more likely to be a 2nd, 3rd or 4th wife.

A 2004 governmental study, which involved 450 interviews, found that the children most at risk for sexual exploitation were girls between the ages of 12 and 18 who worked as street vendors or domestic servants, or who were homeless children or the victims of child trafficking. Such exploitation was most prevalent in areas in which the population and economy were in flux, such as border zones or towns on transportation routes or in mining areas. The study noted that most cases of sexual exploitation went unreported and recommended that the country strengthen its laws to protect children.

=== Female genital mutilation ===
This map shows the % of women and girls aged 15–49 years who have undergone FGM/C. Source: UNICEF (2013). Grey countries were not surveyed.

Female genital mutilation (FGM) is common, particularly in rural areas, and is performed on girls between the ages of six months to six years. About 75% of girls up to age 14 and 89% of women age 15-49 are estimated to have undergone FGM. Girls are often married at age 13–15, so FGM is performed before this age.

The government has launched a two-phase plan to eliminate FGM, originally by 2008. According to the local human rights organisations fighting FGM, the educational phase (workshops, videos, and theatre) continues in cities, and FGM reportedly has decreased substantially among children of educated parents. In many instances, FGM practitioners have agreed to stop the practice in exchange for other income-generating activity. The National Committee Against Violence Towards Women linked all the NGOs combating FGM, and high-profile work by Former Teachers' Union leader Fatoumata Sire Diakite, president of the Association for the Progress and Defense of Women (APDF) have led efforts to educate rural women and community leaders about the danger FGM poses.

Mali has one of the highest rates of FGM in the world, partly due to the fact that there is a very high ongoing support for the practice among the population: only 20% of Malian women and 21% of men think the practice should end.

=== Rape and violence ===
The law criminalises rape. The 2011 US Country Report on Human Rights Practices in Mali states that "There is no law specifically prohibiting spousal rape, but law enforcement officials stated the criminal laws against rape apply to spousal rape." Rape is a widespread problem. Most cases are not reported because of societal pressure, particularly due to the fact that the attackers are frequently close relatives and victims fear retaliation. A report concluded that while 300 women came forward to report sexual abuse every year in Bamako alone, in 2007 only two men were convicted of the crime. Malian organisations like Bamako's Women and Law and Development in Africa, led by lawyer Sidibe Djenba Diop, push for education, strengthening laws, and forcing their application.

Domestic violence against women, including spousal abuse, was tolerated and common. Spousal abuse is a crime, but police were reluctant to enforce laws against or intervene in cases of domestic violence. Assault is punishable by prison terms of one to five years and fines of up to $1,000 (465,000 CFA francs) or, if premeditated, up to 10 years' imprisonment. Many women were reluctant to file complaints against their husbands because they were unable to support themselves financially.

The Ministry for the Promotion of Women, Children, and the Family produced a guide on violence against women for use by healthcare providers, police, lawyers, and judges. The guide provides definitions of the types of violence and guidelines on how each should be handled. NGOs Action for the Defense and Promotion of Women Rights and Action for the Promotion of Household Maids operated shelters.

Sexual harassment occurs routinely, including in schools, without any government efforts to prevent it, and the law does not prohibit it.

== Economic rights and access ==
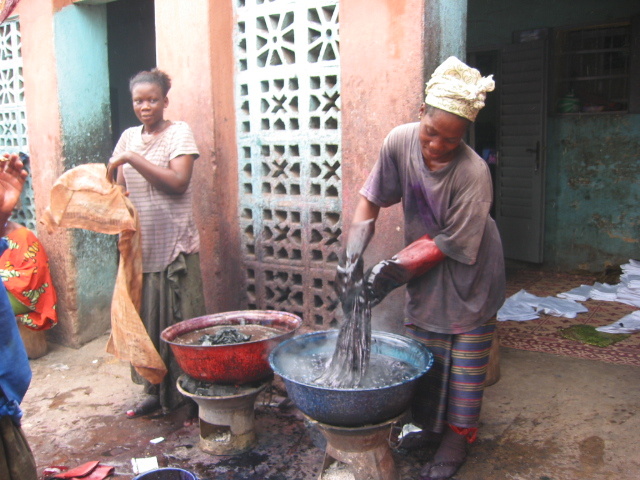
Women dyeing bezin cloth, Bamako. Women, while often doing farm work and childrearing, form 15% of the paid workforce in Mali.

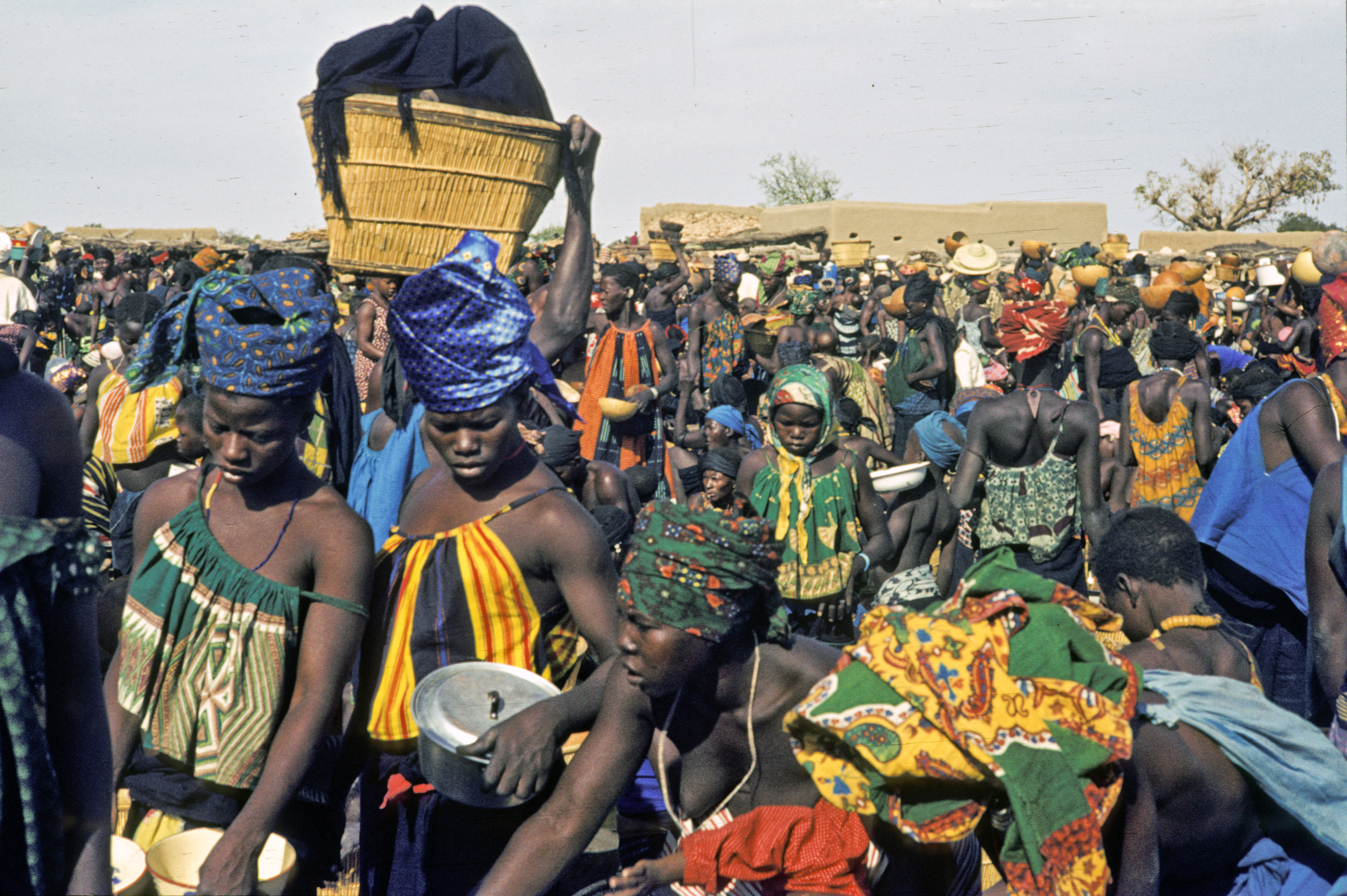
Women at a rural market in Mali.

While the law gives women equal property rights, traditional practice and ignorance of the law prevents women—even educated women—from taking full advantage of their rights. A community property marriage must be specified in the marriage contract. In addition, if the type of marriage was not specified on the marriage certificate, judges presume the marriage was polygynous. While 48% of Malian women are engaged in agriculture, the vast majority may only access land to which men hold the primary rights. While the Constitution and some laws in Mali support equality between men and women, in practice Malian women do not enjoy equal status with men with respect to property rights and inheritance.

Women's access to employment and to economic and educational opportunities is limited. The labor law prohibits discrimination in employment and occupation based on race, gender, religion, political opinion, nationality, or ethnicity; but this is not effectively enforced, and discrimination is common. Most women in Mali work in the informal sector and in agriculture. The government, which is the major formal sector employer, ostensibly pays women the same as men for similar work, but differences in job descriptions result in pay inequality.

Under a 2004–8 national plan of action to promote the status of women, the government continued efforts to reduce inequalities between men and women and to create links between women within the Economic Community of West African States and throughout Africa.

=== Prostitution and trafficking in persons ===
Prostitution is legal, but third party activities (procuring) are illegal. Prostitution is common in Malian cities, and has increased due to the armed conflict.

Mali is a source, transit, and destination country for adults and children subjected to forced labor and sex trafficking. Internal trafficking is more common than transnational trafficking. There are also women and girls from other West African countries, particularly Nigeria and Benin, who are exploited in prostitution and sex trafficking in Mali. These women are often recruited with promises of legitimate jobs in Bamako but then exploited in sex trafficking throughout Mali, including in Chinese-run hotels, and especially in small mining communities. There are reports of corruption and complicity among local police and gendarmes.

The legislative framework was strengthened: Law 2012-023 Relating to the Combat against Trafficking in Persons and Similar Practices, as amended, criminalizes forced labor and sex trafficking. The law prescribes penalties of five to 10 years imprisonment for sex and labor trafficking—except forced begging—and separately criminalizes forced begging with lesser penalties of two to five years imprisonment and a fine.

The Ministry of Justice and the Ministry for the Advancement of Women, Children, and the Family have created programs meant to curb such abuses.

=== Contemporary slavery ===
In 2008, the Tuareg-based human rights group Temedt, along with Anti-Slavery International, reported that "several thousand" members of the Tuareg Bella caste remain enslaved in the Gao Region and especially around the towns of Ménaka and Ansongo. They complain that while laws provide redress, cases are rarely resolved by Malian courts.

=== Employment ===
Malian women with more resources experience less employment security. Factors such as higher fertility and education levels contribute to a lack of opportunities for a steady job. In Mali, increasing age, job stability of one's partner, and occupation in the agricultural sector raise women's employment security. The increase in job stability is especially true for Malian women who participate in more social situations. Generally, regardless of the factors mentioned, women of childbearing age are discouraged from working and are expected to begin tending to family responsibilities.

Women are greatly discriminated against in Malian workspaces. They have a low compensation, showing a difference of over 30 percent in pay packages compared to their public sector male counterparts in 2001. In the private sector, the difference was approximately 15 percent in 2001.

Rural women typically take up work in the farming industry. However, their lack of resources limits their ability to store, process, and market their products. Additionally, their lack of education on proper conservation and processing leads to spoilage in seasons of high yield. These limitations result in poor economic returns. Child labor is also a significant component of Malian employment. Girls typically work with women, and boys with men. Girls in rural areas tend to have larger workloads than boys and men. They are expected to do household chores in addition to their fieldwork. These chores include cooking for the family, doing laundry, and shopping on 'market days.' Their farm work involves plowing fields with cows and picking plant seeds. The overworking of young girls affects their education; they lack attendance and struggle with academic performance.

Work in the formal sector is typically given to women in urban areas. Examples of such work include governmental careers, state-owned companies, and private enterprises.

== Women's pressure groups ==
Several women's rights groups, such as the Association of Malian Women Lawyers, the Association of Women in Law and Development, the Collective of Women's Associations, and the Association for the Defense of Women's Rights (Association pour le Progres et la Defense des Droits des Femmes Maliennes – APDF), worked to highlight legal inequities, primarily in the family code, through debates, conferences, and women's rights training. These groups also provided legal assistance to women and targeted magistrates, police officers, and religious and traditional leaders in educational outreach to promote women's rights.

Malian women's rights NGOs, such as Action for the Promotion and Development of Women, the Committee for the Defense of Women's Rights, and the Women's and Children's Rights Watch (CADEF), educated local populations about the negative consequences of underage marriage. The government also helped to enable girls married at an early age to continue in school.

== Women in politics ==
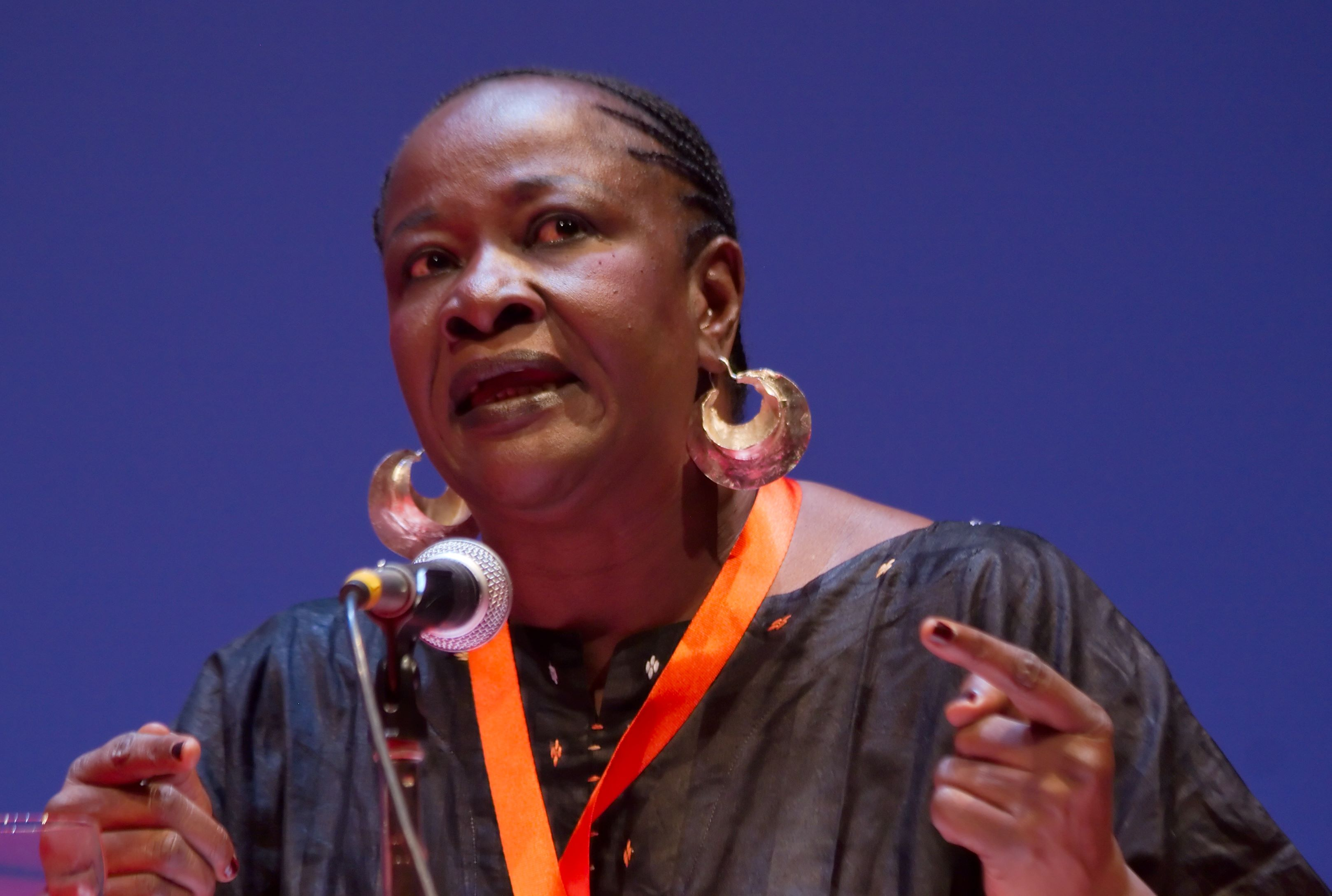
Aminata Traoré, a prominent Malian politician, writer, and activist. A small number of women in Mali have risen to the highest levels of society.

A small number of Malian women have reached the highest level of business, academia and government, with women holding several government Ministerial posts and seats in the National Assembly of Mali. Aminata Dramane Traoré, author and political activist has served as the Minister of Culture and Tourism of Mali, coordinator of the United Nations Development Programme, and board member of the International Press Service.

Sidibé Aminata Diallo, a professor at the University of Bamako, is leader of the Movement for Environmental Education and Sustainable Development political party, and in 2007 became the first woman to stand for President of Mali as one of eight candidates in the April 2007 presidential election. Diallo received over 12,000 votes in the election, 0.55% of the total.

== See also ==
- Human rights in Mali
- Children's rights in Mali
- Education in Mali
- Culture of Mali
- Education in Africa
- Women's rights
- Human rights
