= Ahmadou =

Ahmadou is a given name. Notable people with the name include:

- Ahmadou Ahidjo (1924–1989), Cameroonian politician
- Ahmadou Camara (born 2003), Guinean footballer
- Ahmadou Kourouma (1927–2003), Ivorian novelist
- Ahmadou Lamine Ndiaye (born 1937), Senegalese scientist
- Ahmadou Eboa Ngomna (born 1983), Cameroonian footballer
- Ahmadou Touré, Malian politician
- Ahmadou Wagué, Senegalese physicist
- Almamy Ahmadou of Timbo, Guinean politician
