= Post-literacy =

Education programs for recently literate adults

Post-literacy or post-literacy education is a concept used in continuing education and adult education programs aimed at recently literate or "neo-literate" adults and communities, largely in the developing world. Unlike continuing education or further education, which covers secondary or vocational topics for adult learners, post-literacy programs provide skills which might otherwise be provided in primary education settings. Post-literacy education aims to solidify literacy education, provide resources and media aimed at the newly literate, and also may create systems of non-formal education to serve these communities. Projects include providing formal continuing education, providing written materials (the literate environment) relevant to economic development to newly literate members of developing societies, and leveraging radio and other non-written media to increase access to educational material in informal settings. Rather than viewing post-literacy as a period that begins once reading skills are mastered, it is better understood as the surrounding context of a "literate environment." In this view, post-literacy represents the ongoing process of applying and maintaining those skills through regular daily use.

The concept of a post-literate society is often defined by a shift in how information is prioritized rather than a total loss of reading ability. According to the Dictionary of the Social Sciences, post-literacy occurs when the written word is superseded by interactive and visual media as the dominant mode of communication, even within technically literate populations. This transition is viewed by media historians not as the end of the printed book, but as the end of its "monopoly" on the cultural map, similar to how manuscripts survived the invention of the printing press. From a linguistic perspective, this shift is characterized by a "new orality" on the internet, where the boundaries between speech and writing blur and speed is favored over traditional syntax. In the field of international development, organizations like UNESCO emphasize that post-literacy is a functional environment—a "literate environment" that provides the necessary social and material infrastructure to prevent the regression of basic reading skills. Ultimately, this results in a change in the hierarchy of the senses, where auditory and visual processing begin to dominate the linear-logical processing traditionally associated with print culture.

The emergence of generative AI (GenAI) has introduced a new dimension to post-literacy, where the primary challenge shifts from producing text to curating and verifying it. In a post-literate environment, "AI literacy" is defined as the ability to critically evaluate machine-generated outputs, understand their underlying mechanisms, and navigate the ethical implications of automated content. This transition is disrupting traditional literacy strategies such as reading comprehension and syntax mastery; as students increasingly rely on AI for editing and summarization, there is a noted risk of "regression" in fundamental grammar and spelling skills.

Post-literacy in the digital age is increasingly governed by "algorithmic literacy," which involves understanding how algorithms influence the information individuals consume and positioning them as active agents rather than passive recipients. Contemporary digital literacy models, such as the South Pacific Digital Literacy Framework (SPDLF), categorize literacy into six distinct domains—media, information, visual, communication, technology, and computer literacy—suggesting that "reading" now requires an intuitive ability to decipher visual messages embedded in graphic interfaces and search engine results.

== See also ==
- Education in Mali
- History of education in the United States
- International Literacy Day
- Literacy
- Literacy in India
  - National literacy mission (India)
- Nicaraguan Literacy Campaign
- UNESCO Confucius Prize for Literacy
- United Nations Literacy Decade

== Bibliography ==
- Dave, R. H.; And Others. Learning Strategies for Post-Literacy and Continuing Education: A Cross-National Perspective. Second Edition. Outcomes of an International Research Project. Studies on Post-Literacy and Continuing Education 1. (1988)
- Manandhar, Udaya; And Others. Empowering Women and Families through Literacy in Nepal. [and] Participatory Video as a Post-Literacy Activity for Women in Rural Nepal. Convergence v27 n2-3 p102-118 1994
- Muller, Josef, (Ed.). Learning Strategies for Post-Literacy. The Tanzanian Approach. A Reader. German Foundation for International Development, Tanzania Ministry of Education, (1986)
- Kothari, B. Same language subtitling: Integrating post literacy development and popular culture on television. Media and Technology for Human Resource Development, 1999
- Lasway, Rest B. The Impact of Post-Literacy: A Tanzanian Case Study. International Review of Education, Vol. 35, No. 4, Post-Literacy (1989), pp. 479–489
- Ouane, Adama . Rural Newspapers and Radio of Post-Literacy in Mali. Prospects: Quarterly Review of Education v12 n2 p243-53 1982
- Ouane, Adama (ed), R. H. Dave (Author), D. A. Perera (Author). Learning Strategies for Post-Literacy and Continuing Education in Mali, Niger, Senegal and Upper Volta/U1475 (UIE studies on post-literacy and continuing education)Unesco Inst of Education (July 1986) ISBN 978-92-820-1039-6
- Ranaweera, A. M.(Ed.), R. H. Dave (Author), A. Ouane (Author). Learning Strategies for Post-Literacy and Continuing Education in Brazil, Colombia, Jamaica and Venezuela (Uie Studies on Post-Literacy and Continuin). Unesco Inst of Education (August 1987) ISBN 92-820-1042-2
- Rogers, Alan (ed), Bryan Maddox, Juliet Milligan, Katy Newell Jones, Uta Papen, Anna Robinson-Pant. Re-defining Post-Literacy in a Changing World. Department for International Development, Education Research Report No. 29, London. (1999) ISBN 1-86192-069-5
- Srivastava, Hari S. Some Innovative Initiatives in Literacy, Post-Literacy and Continuing Education in Asia. International Review of Education, Vol. 30, No. 3, Adult Education in a Rapidly Changing World (1984), pp. 369–375
- Zhu, Qing-Ping and Rong-Guang Dai. Institutions of post-literacy in China. International Review of Education/Internationale Zeitschrift für Erziehungswissenschaft/Revue internationale l'éducation. Volume 35, Number 4 / December, 1989
