= IUG =

IUG may stand for:

- the International University in Geneva, a private University in Switzerland
- the Islamic University of Gaza
- an institute of the University of Bamako
- an institute of the University of Grenoble-Alpes in France
