= Convergences 2007 =

Political party in Mali

The Convergences 2007 is a political party in Mali. In the 2007 Malian presidential elections, the party's candidate, Soumeylou Boubèye Maïga, won 1.46% of the popular vote.
