= University of Legal and Political Sciences of Bamako =

- Université des sciences juridiques et politiques de Bamako
- Type: Public university
- Rector: Bouréma Kansaye
- Dean: 3
- Faculty: 400
- Students: 15,000
- Postgraduates: (LDPSC)
- Location: Bamako, Bamako, Mali; 12.6115373°N 7.9912274°W
- Campus: 4
- Language: French
- Website: usjpb.edu.ml

The University of Legal and Political Sciences of Bamako is a public university located in Bamako, Mali.

== History ==
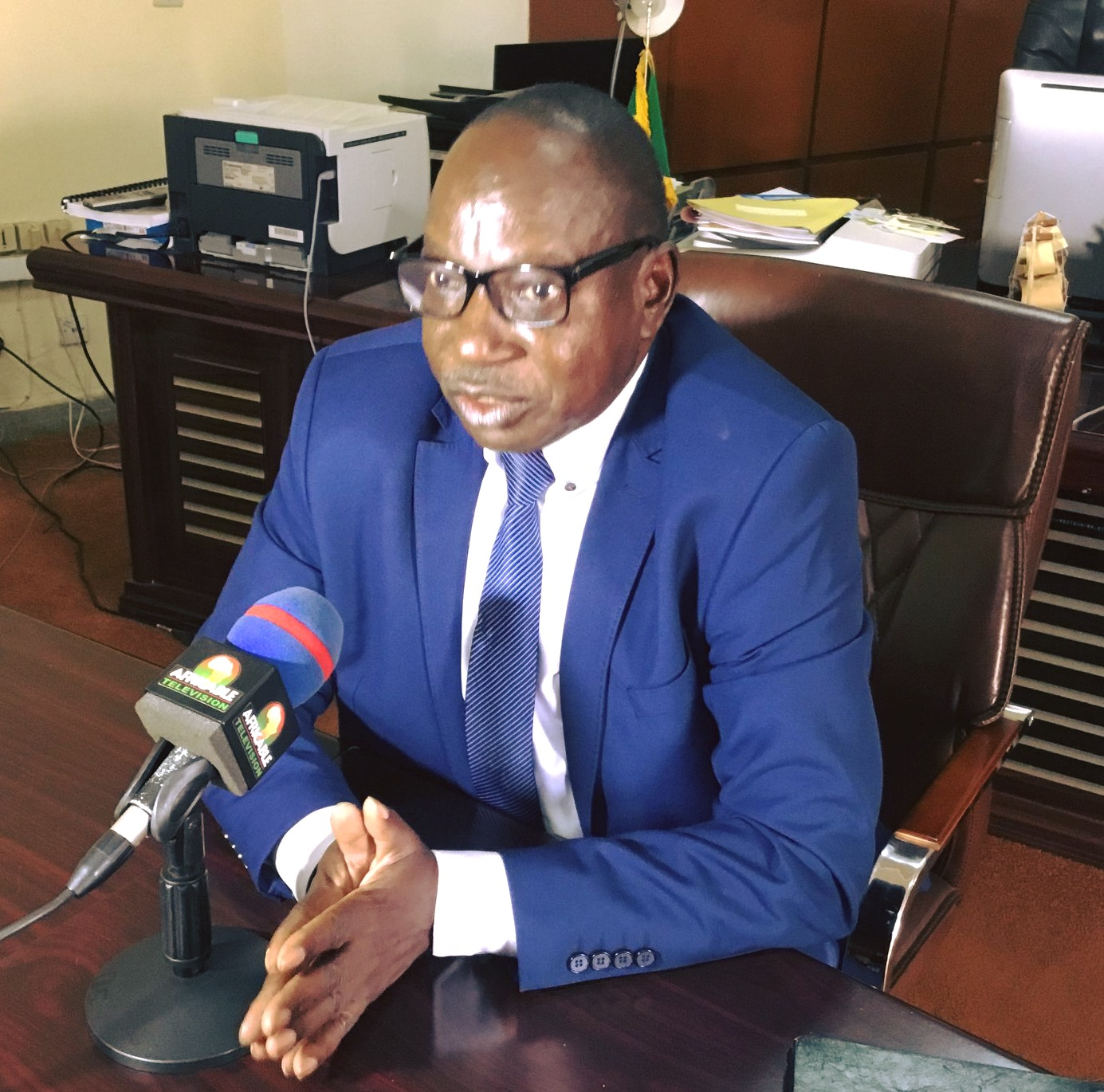
Professor Moussa Djire, former rector.

In 2006, it contributed to creating the Network for Excellence in Higher Education in West Africa.

On 28, the Malian government, under the Government of Cissé Mariam Kaïdama Sidibé, adopted in the Council of Ministers four ordinance projects creating the "Universities of Bamako" to replace the University of Bamako, whose numbers had become too large.

The creation of the University of Legal and Political Sciences of Bamako was approved by the Malian National Assembly on 8.

On 11, Professor Moussa Djire was appointed by the government, gathered in the Council of Ministers, as the rector of the University of Legal and Political Sciences of Bamako, one of the four universities created from the division of the University of Bamako. He handed over in July 2022 to Professor Bouréma Kansaye.

== Education and research ==
The university has partnerships in Europe, America, Asia, and Africa.

== See also ==
- University of Legal and Political Sciences of Bamako (USJPB)
- Faculty of Private Law (FDPri)
- Faculty of Public Law (FDPU)
- Faculty of Administrative and Political Sciences (FSAP)
- University of Letters and Human Sciences of Bamako (ULSHB)
- University of Social Sciences and Management of Bamako (USGB)
- University of Science, Technology, and Techniques of Bamako (USTTB)
