= Culture of Mali =

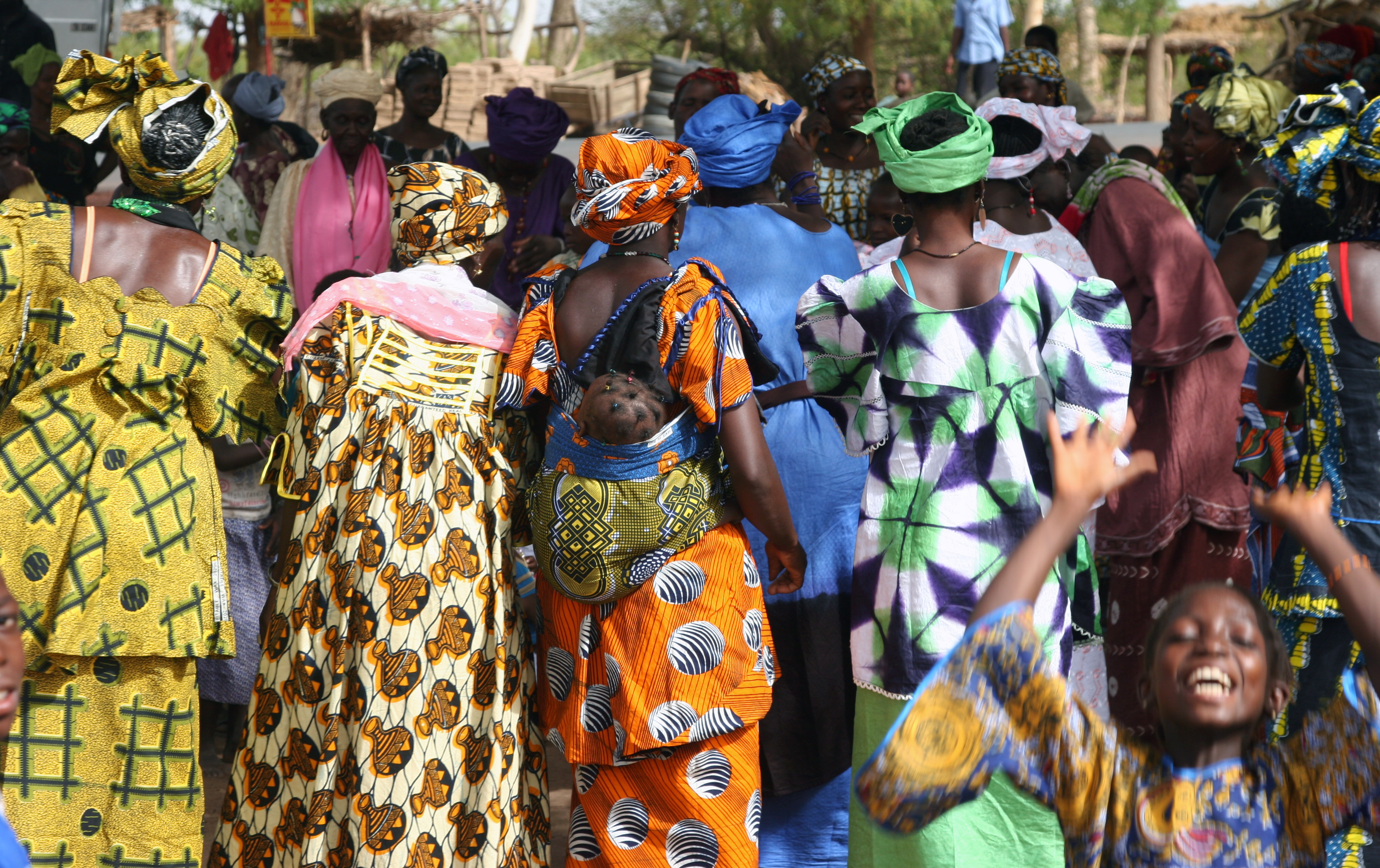
A crowd of women in Mali.

The culture of Mali is shaped by its shared history as a colonial and post-colonial nation, along with the interactions between the many ethnic groups that make up its people. What is now the nation of Mali was first unified during the medieval period under the Mali Empire. Although the modern state does not include some areas in the southwest and extends further east and northeast, the dominant role of the Mandé people, who gave their name to the empire, remains a key aspect of Mali’s identity today.

Songhay, Bozo, and Dogon people predominate, while the Fula people, formerly nomadic, have settled in various parts of the nation. Tuareg and Maure people continue to practice a largely nomadic desert culture in the north. The interaction of these communities (along with dozens of other smaller ethnicities) has given rise to a Malian culture marked by both heterogeneity and the blending of traditions.

== Ethnic patchwork and intermixing ==
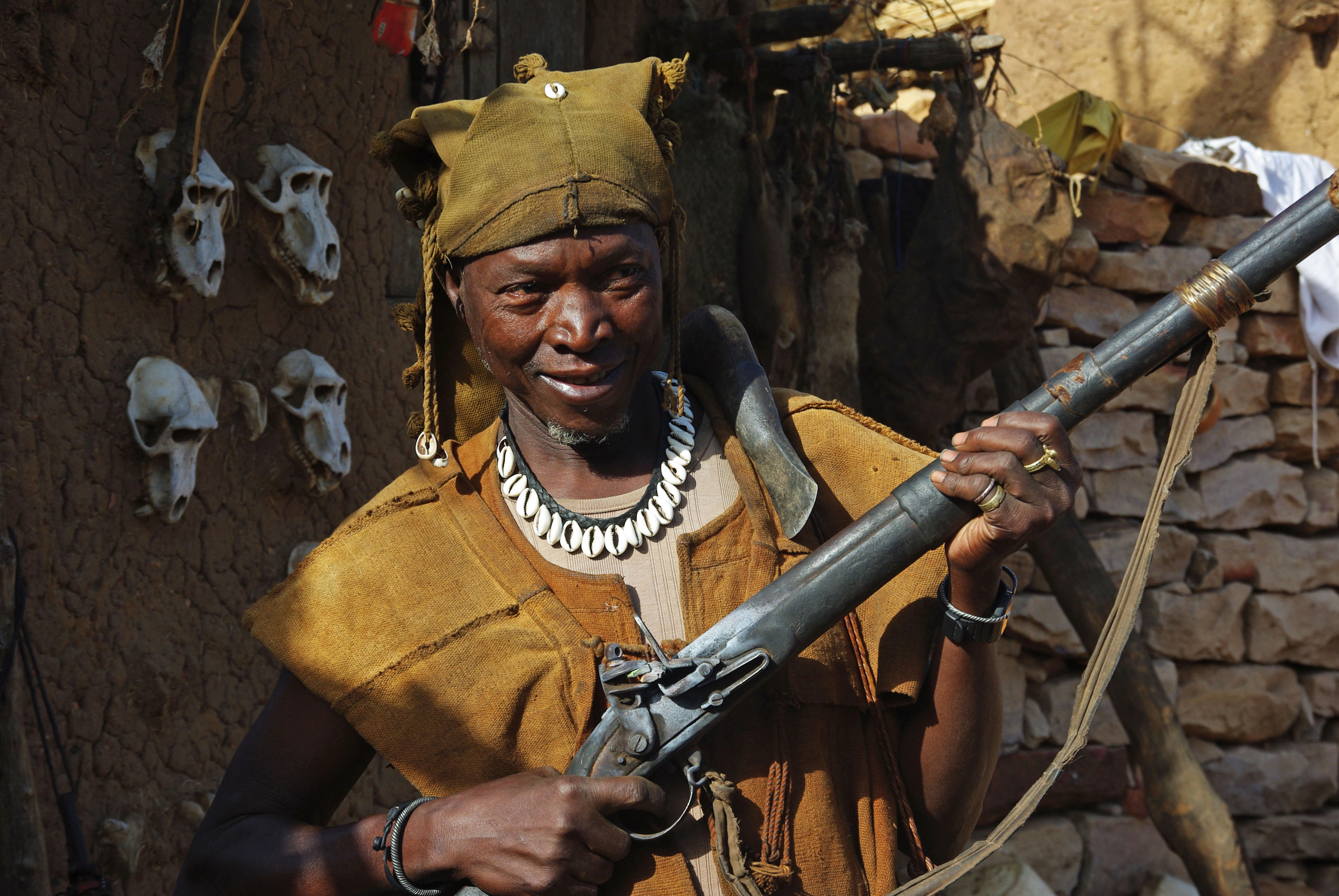
A Dogon hunter with an old flintlock rifle still in use.

Mande people share a caste system in which certain skills (metalworking, fishing, history-keeping) are passed down through families. The rituals and cultural associations of these activities have spread far beyond the Mande communities themselves.

While the Malinké–Dyula, and Bambara people form a Mande core (at around 50%) of Malian culture in the densely populated regions of the south and east, a mosaic of other cultures also contribute to Malian society.

The Fula people, originally nomadic but now as often village and city dwelling, are scattered in communities across the nation as they are over much of West Africa. Fula peoples were amongst the first and most fervent believers in Islam, which orders the lives of the vast majority of Malians. The Fula traditions of nomadic cattle herding has bequeathed values of mobility and independence, and at the same time created networks of mutual dependence between certain communities and cultures. The Fula transhumance cycle meant that entire Fula tribes would spend seasons living in Bambara communities, creating formalized relationships called Cousinage. This survives to this day as the Malian cultural institution known as sanankuya, or the "joking relationship". In Mali, the state of Macina, in the midst of the Inner Niger Delta was dominated by Fula people and culture.

Dogon and Songhay people are dominant in the east of the country, with the Songhay Empire pushing traditionally animist Dogon deep into the isolating hill country of the southeast. Here the Dogon have maintained a unique culture, art, and lifestyle which has become a source of pride for all Malians.

All along the edge of the Sahara, and far into the dry land of isolated oases live the nomadic Berber Tuareg and the (in the northwest) Maures (or Moors), of Arab-o-Berber origins. While making up only 10% of the population, these groups bring a distinct culture to modern Mali.

== Music ==
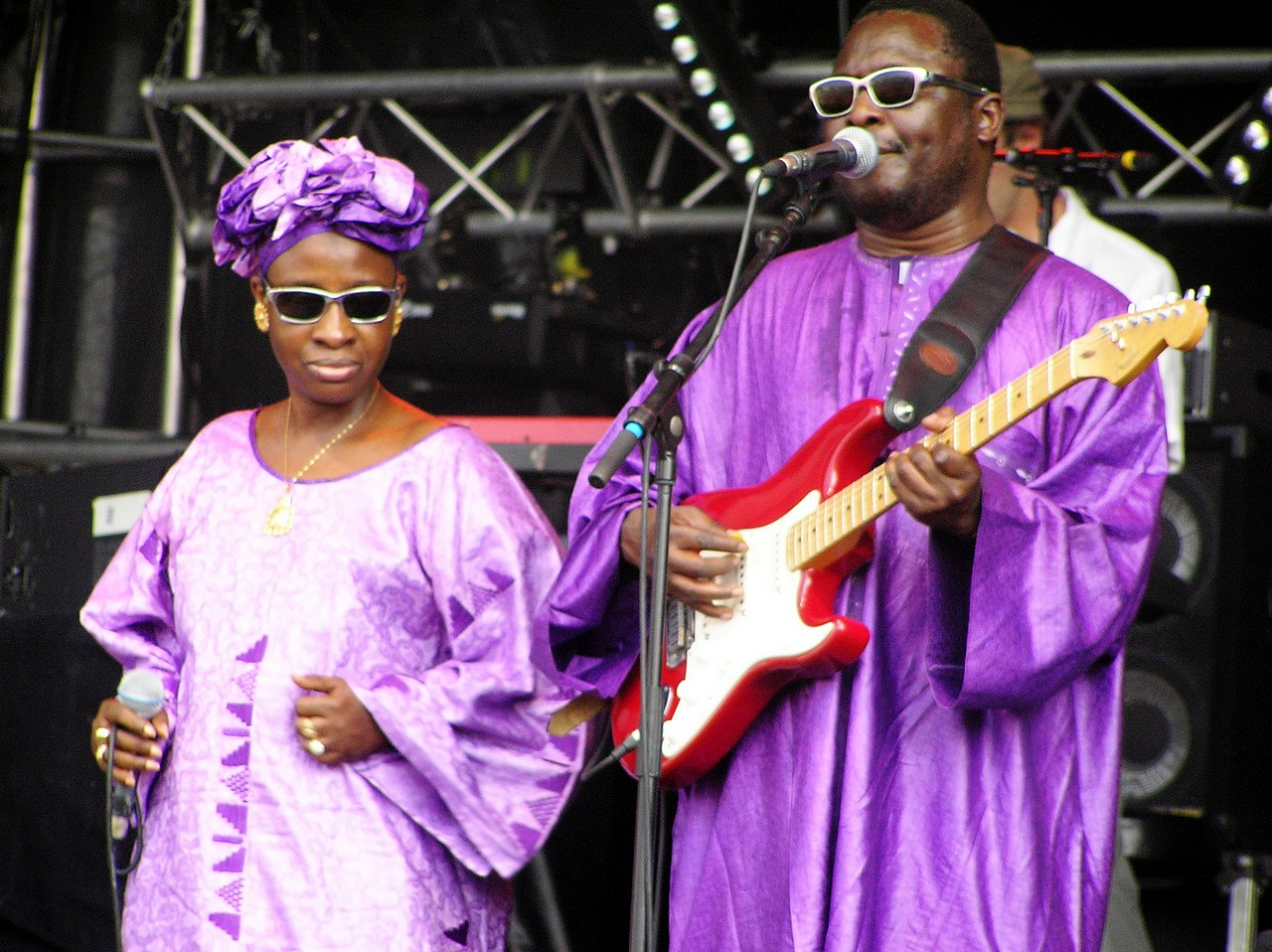
Malian musical duo Amadou et Mariam are known internationally for their music, combining Malian and international influences.

Malian musical traditions are often derived from Mande griots or jalis, a family-based caste of performing poets. While today, griots are often seen as praise singers at local weddings or civic events, where historically they served as court historians, advisors, and diplomats.

The music of Mali is best known outside of Africa for the kora virtuosos Toumani Diabaté and Ballaké Sissoko, the late roots and blues guitarist Ali Farka Touré, and his successors Afel Bocoum and Vieux Farka Touré, the Tuareg band Tinariwen, and several Afro-pop artists such as Salif Keita, the duo Amadou et Mariam, and Oumou Sangaré.

== Literature ==
Though Mali's literature is less famous than its music, Mali has always been one of Africa's liveliest intellectual centers. Mali's literary tradition is largely oral, with jalis reciting or singing histories and stories from memory. Amadou Hampâté Bâ, Mali's best-known historian, spent much of his life recording the oral traditions of his own Fula teachers, as well as those of Bambara and other Mande neighbors.

The best-known novel by a Malian writer is Yambo Ouologuem's Le devoir de violence, which won the 1968 Prix Renaudot but whose legacy was marred by accusations of plagiarism. It is a dark history of a loosely disguised Bambara Empire, focused on slavery, injustice and suffering.

Massa Makan Diabaté, a descendant of griots, is known in the Francophone world for his work on The Epic of Sundiata as well as his "Kouta trilogy," a series of realist novels loosely based on contemporary life in his hometown of Kita. Other well-known Malian writers include Baba Traoré, Modibo Sounkalo Keita, Maryse Condé (a native of the French Antilles, has made a career writing about the Bamabara people from whom she descends), Moussa Konaté, and Fily Dabo Sissoko. Ousmane Sembène, a Wolof Senegalese novelist, set half of his novel God's Bits of Wood in Bamako.

== Festivals, food, and clothing ==
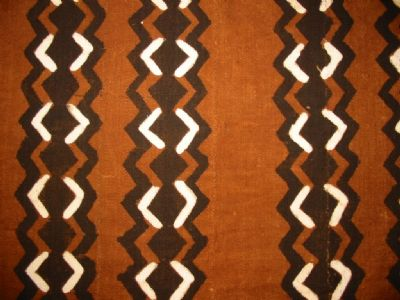
Bògòlanfini fabric.

The varied everyday culture of Malians reflects the country's ethnic and geographic diversity. Most Malians wear flowing, colorful robes called boubloveous, that are typical of West Africa. Malians frequently participate in traditional festivals, dances, and ceremonies.

=== Public holidays ===
Friday and Sunday are half days at most businesses, while Saturday is usually a day of rest. Friday afternoon is the time of Muslim weekly prayers, while the half day on the Christian sabbath is a tradition from the time of French colonial rule. Muslim, Christian, and National celebrations are marked as public holidays in Mali.

==== Christmas ====
Mainly a Muslim nation, Christmas is a public holiday celebrated by a significant proportion of Christians who make up less than 3% of the population. Some traditional festivities in big focus involve church services where worshippers spend over 30 hours in church during the Christmas period. They also speak different languages during services and every language group takes turn to sing a Christmas carol.

=== Food ===
Rice and millet are the staples of Malian cuisine, which is heavily based on cereal grains. Grains are generally prepared with sauces made from a variety of edible leaves, such as spinach or baobab, with tomato peanut sauce, and may be accompanied by pieces of grilled meat (typically chicken, mutton, beef, pork, or goat).

Malian cuisine varies regionally. Other popular dishes include fufu, jollof rice, and maafe.

New ways of promoting Malian gastronomy are emerging through activities such as the "DIBI festival". Which is a gastronomic, artistic and cultural meeting in Bamako, which is held over 3 days with good "Dibi" and show for a pleasant moment.

=== Textiles ===
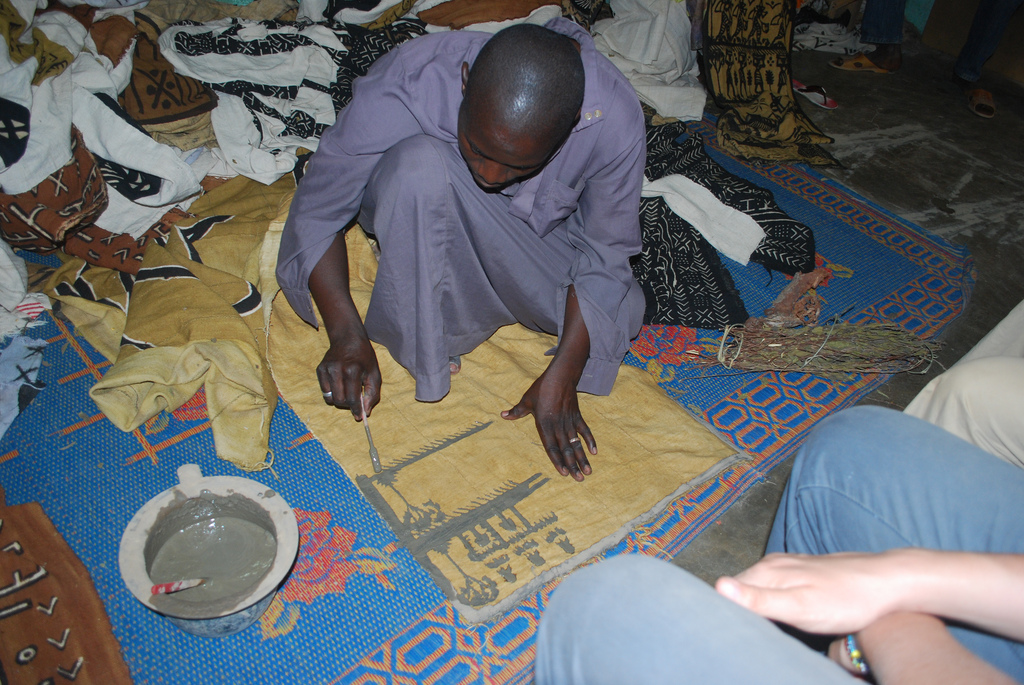
A textile artisan at work in Djenne, Mali.

Bògòlanfini ("mud cloth"), a handmade cotton fabric, traditionally dyed with fermented mud, has an important place in traditional Malian culture, and has more recently, become a symbol of Malian cultural identity. The cloth is being exported worldwide for use in fashion, fine art, and decoration.

== Sports ==
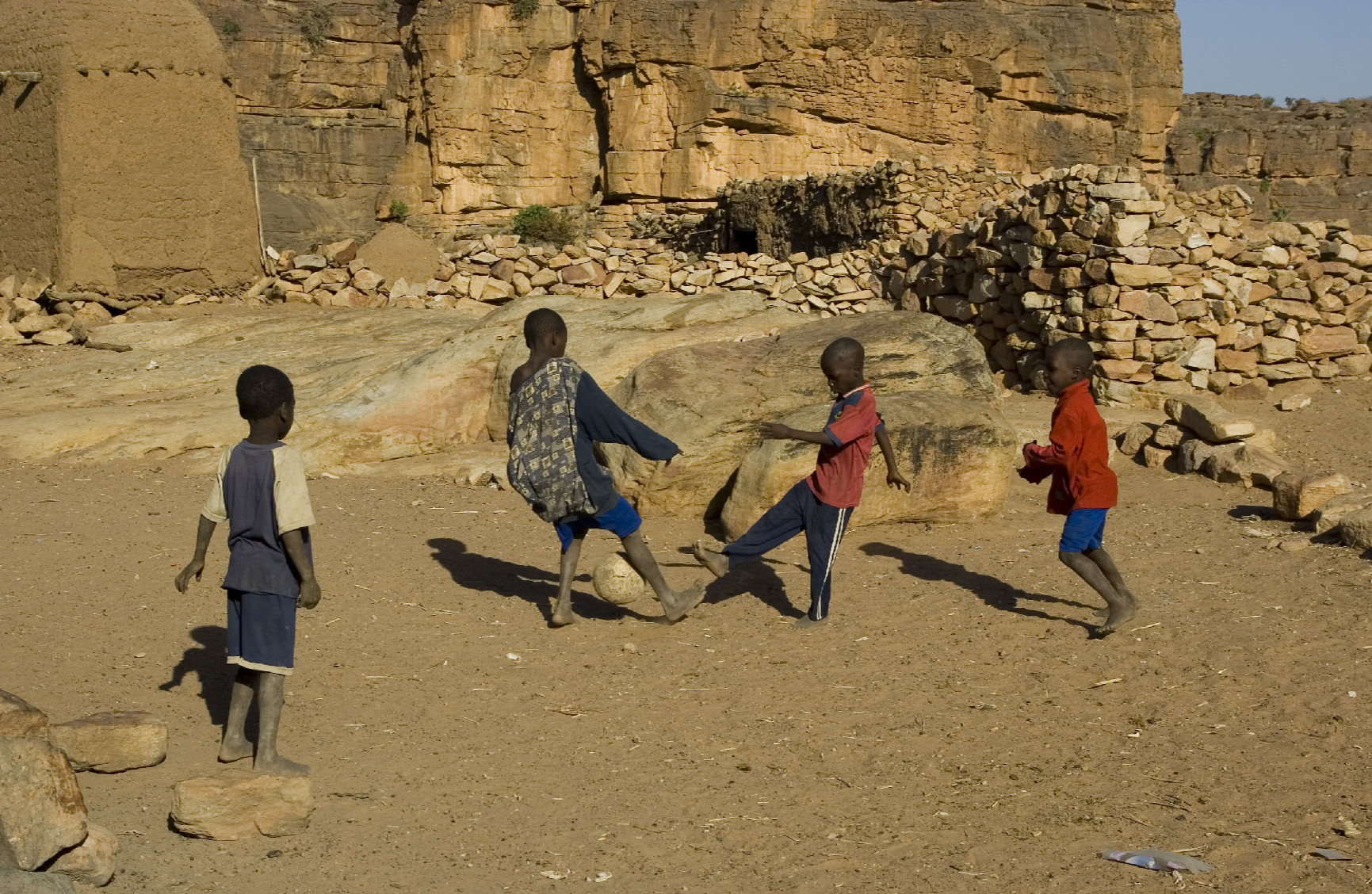
Malian children playing football

Football is the most popular sport in Mali. Mali's national team became more prominent, after hosting the 2002 African Cup of Nations but has never qualified for the World Cup despite making it to the final round of the 2018 World Cup Qualifiers. Most towns and cities have regular games; the most popular national teams are Djoliba, Stad, and Real. Informal games are often played by youths, using a bundle of rags as a ball.

Mali has produced several notable players namely Seydou Keita, Adama Traore, and Moussa Marega Basketball is another major sport; the Mali women's national basketball team is the only African basketball team that competed at the 2008 Beijing Olympics. Traditional wrestling (la lutte) is also somewhat common, though its popularity has declined in recent years. The game wari, a mancala variant, is a common pastime.

== See also ==
- Architecture of Mali
- National Museum of Mali
