= Sidibé Aminata Diallo =

Malian politician

- Born: 1950; Mali
- Education: University of Toulouse; University of Bamako
- Occupation: Politician
- Notable work: Professor at the University of Bamako; Previously worked for UNESCO

Sidibé Aminata Diallo (born 1950) is a Malian academic and politician. She is a professor in town planning at the University of Bamako and has previously worked for UNESCO.

== Academia ==
Diallo gained her doctorate in development and urban studies from the University of Toulouse in 1984. She is a member of the faculty of Economic Sciences and Management at the University of Bamako, where she specializes in land management.

== Politics ==
On 12 March 2007, Diallo declared her candidacy for the position of President. She was one of 8 candidates contesting the April 2007 presidential election. She was also the first female presidential candidate ever in Mali, and was running as the candidate of the 'Movement for Environmental Education and Sustainable Development'. Her primary interest is sustainability and environmental protection. Diallo received over 12,000 votes in the election, 0.55% of the total.

Following the election, Diallo was appointed as Minister of Basic Education, Literacy, and the National Languages on 3 October 2007. She held that position until being replaced by Salikou Sanogo on 9 April 2009.
