= Ahmadou Wagué =

Physicist and academic

- Education: Toulouse III - Paul Sabatier University
- Scientific career
- Workplaces: Cheikh Anta Diop University
- Thesis: Etude theorique des processus de photoabsorption des systemes atomiques a deux electrons (1984)

Ahmadou Wagué is a Senegalese physicist who is a professor of physics at the Cheikh Anta Diop University. He has served as Vice President of the African Physical Society, President of the African Laser, Atomic Molecular, and Optical Sciences Network, member of the Senegalese National Academy of Science and Technology and founding member of the African Laser Centre.

== Early life and education ==
Wagué is from Senegal. He was a doctoral student at the Moscow State University and the Toulouse III - Paul Sabatier University, where he investigated two electron atomic systems.

== Research and career ==
Wagué has been involved in building interest and capacity in photonics sciences in Africa. In 1991 he became the founding Director of LAM, the African Laser, Atomic Molecular, and Optical Sciences Network. In 2002, Wagué was a founding member of the African Laser Centre. The centre was formed to provide African researchers with access to world-class laser facilities.

The International Centre for Theoretical Physics reviewed the effectiveness of campaigns to support physics in Africa, and questioned whether the African Physical Society was "the society Africa wanted and needed,". After the report was released, Wagué called for the need to reform the African Physical Society. He was appointed their President, and oversaw a special Journal of the Optical Society of America focused on research in optics in Africa.

Wagué was elected to the International Council for the American Physical Society in 2017. He was elected a Fellow of the Society in 2022.

== Personal life ==
Wagué can speak several African languages, as well as English, French and Russian.

== Selected publications ==
- Mbaye Diouf; Amine Ben Salem; Rim Cherif; Hamed Saghaei; Ahmadou Wague (2017). "Super-flat coherent supercontinuum source in As_{38.8}Se_{61.2} chalcogenide photonic crystal fiber with all-normal dispersion engineering at a very low input energy". Applied Optics. 56 (2): 163–169. Bibcode:2017ApOpt..56..163D. doi:10.1364/ao.56.000163. PMID 28085846. Wikidata Q51045749.
- Salem, Amine Ben; Diouf, Mbaye; Cherif, Rim; Wague, Ahmadou; Zghal, Mourad (June 2016). "Ultraflat-top midinfrared coherent broadband supercontinuum using all normal As2S5-borosilicate hybrid photonic crystal fiber". Optical Engineering. 55 (6) 066109. Bibcode:2016OptEn..55f6109B. doi:10.1117/1.OE.55.6.066109. ISSN 0091-3286.
- Alassane, Traore; Mouhamadou, Diallo; Omar, Gueye Papa El Hadji; Ahmadou, Wague; Pierre, Lutgen; Ousmane, Sarr; Souleymane, Mboup (2013). "Characterization of element and mineral content in Artemisia annua and Camellia sinensis leaves by handheld X-ray fluorescence". African Journal of Biotechnology. 12 (26). doi:10.4314/ajb.v12i26 (inactive 11 July 2025). ISSN 1684-5315.
