= 2007 Malian presidential election =

- 29 April 2007
- Turnout: 36.24%
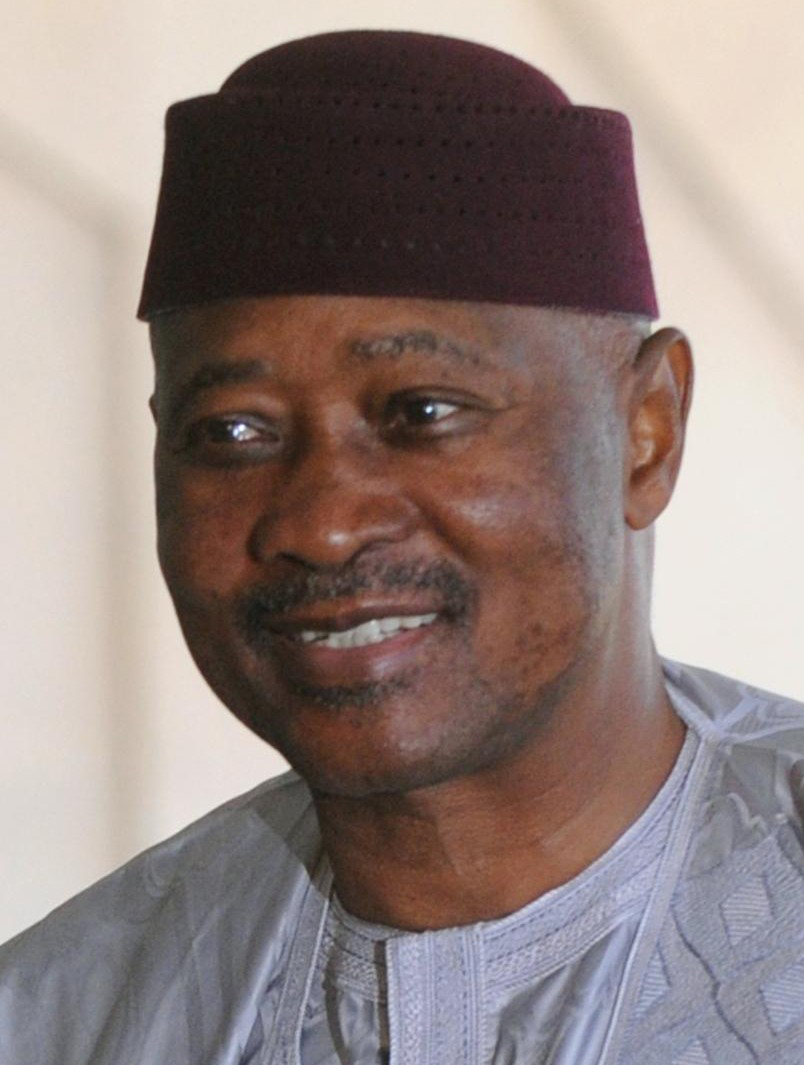

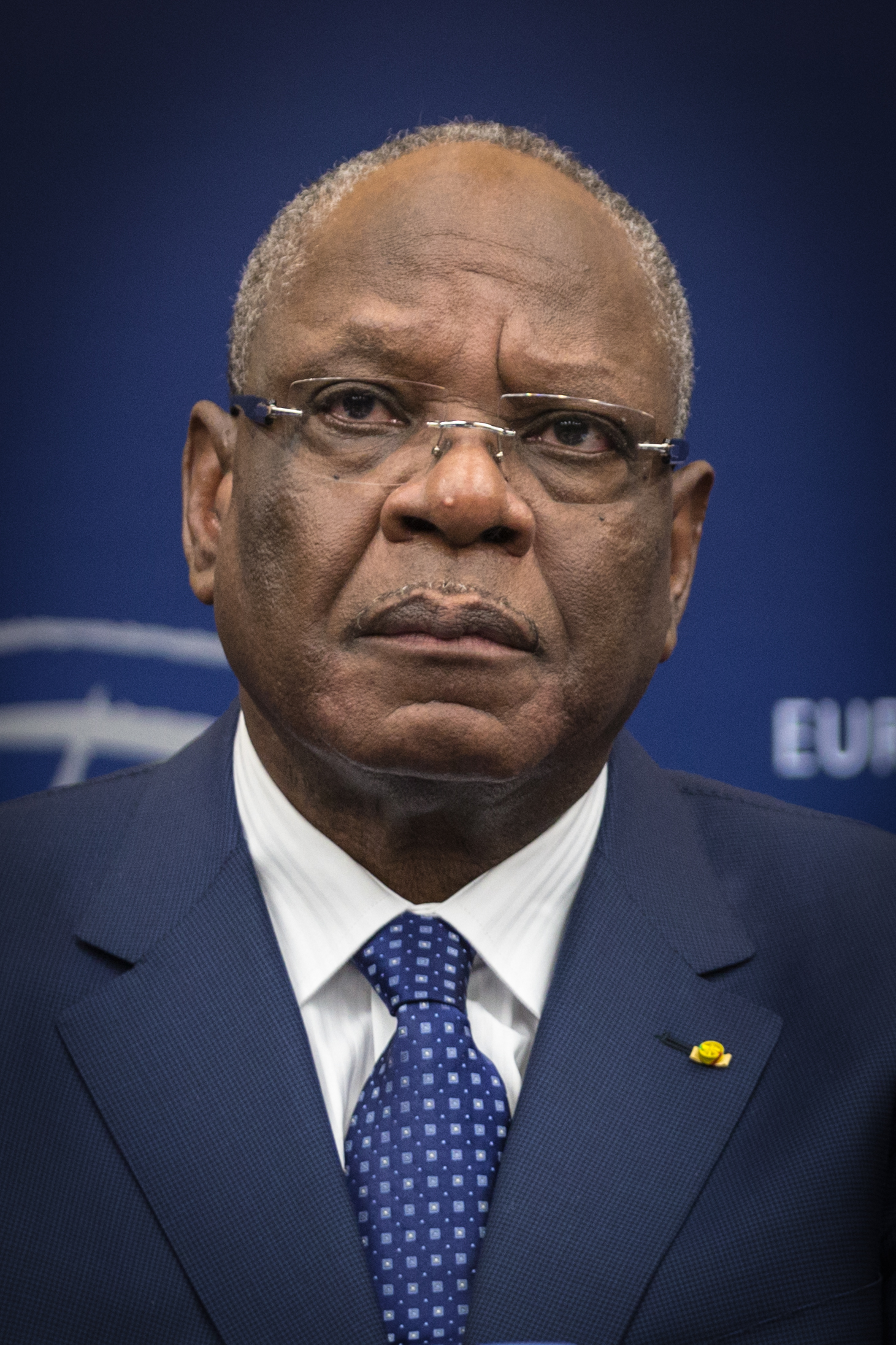
Nominee	Amadou Toumani Touré	Ibrahim Boubacar Keïta
Party	Independent	RPM
Popular vote	1,612,912	433,897
Percentage	71.20%	19.15%
- Results by region
President before election
Amadou Toumani Touré
Independent
President-elect
Amadou Toumani Touré
Independent

Presidential elections were held in Mali on 29 April 2007. Incumbent president Amadou Toumani Touré ran for re-election against seven other candidates and won in the first round with about 71% of the vote.

== Background ==
=== Nominations ===
Ibrahim Boubacar Keïta, the President of the National Assembly, was nominated as the presidential candidate of the Rally for Mali on 28 January 2007. On 18 February former Foreign Minister Tiébilé Dramé was nominated as the candidate of the Party for National Rebirth (PARENA), and on 24 February Oumar Mariko was nominated as the candidate of African Solidarity for Democracy and Independence. Sidibé Aminata Diallo, a female professor, announced on 12 March that she intended to stand as the candidate of the Rally for Sustainable Education and Development. The former ruling party, the Alliance for Democracy in Mali (ADEMA), opted to support the incumbent president, Amadou Toumani Touré. Former Defense Minister Soumeylou Boubèye Maiga, the Vice-President of ADEMA, was expelled from the party for opposing the decision as he intended to run for president himself. He was subsequently designated as the candidate of his movement, Convergences 2007, on 24 March. The National Union for the Republic (UNPR) nominated Modibo Sangaré as its candidate on 26 March. President Touré announced he would run for re-election in the town of Nioro du Sahel on 27 March. On the same day, the Social Democratic Convention nominated Mamadou Blaise Sangaré as its candidate.

On 1 April the Constitutional Court issued a provisional list of eight candidates who would contest the election; Touré, Ibrahim Boubacar Keïta, Mamadou Blaise Sangaré, Tiébilé Dramé, Soumeylou Boubèye Maiga, Oumar Mariko, Sidibe Aminata Diallo, and Madiassa Maguiraga. Modibo Sangaré's candidacy was rejected by the court on the grounds that he had not paid the required bond of 10 million CFA francs. No requests were filed for the invalidation of any of the eight candidates on the provisional list, and therefore the Court confirmed the list as final on 3 April. Six of the eight approved candidates had contested the 2002 presidential elections, Maiga and Diallo being the exceptions. Diallo was also the first-ever woman to run for president in Mali; a woman had attempted to run in 2002, but her candidacy had been rejected.

In order to have their candidacies accepted by the court, candidates were required to be sponsored by at least ten members of the National Assembly or at least five communal advisors from each of the country's regions, as well as Bamako, the capital (a minimum of 45 combined). Touré was sponsored by 414 communal advisors, Keïta by 17 members of parliament, Mamadou Blaise Sangaré by 11 members of parliament, Dramé by 87 communal advisors, Maiga by 114 communal advisors, Mariko by 71 communal advisors, Diallo by 14 members of parliament and Maguiraga by 55 communal advisors. The introduction of sponsors, in addition to an increase in the guarantee that had to be paid, was considered responsible for the significant reduction in the number of candidates from the 2002 elections, when there were 24 candidates.

=== Voter registration ===
Voter registration cards began to be distributed in Bamako on 30 March. However, by 7 April less than 3% of the voter cards had been distributed. On 14 April the cards were made easier to obtain, but by 25 April fewer than 50% were thought to have been distributed. The latter date had been made a public holiday in order to encourage voters to get the cards prior to the deadline at midnight, after which it was reported that about 63.78% had been distributed. The best rate of distribution was in Mopti Region with 71.7%; it was worst in Bamako, with 30.6%. The total distribution percentage was subsequently raised to about 66.7%, apparently due to Malians abroad obtaining the cards.

== Campaign ==
The campaign for the election began on 8 April and continued until midnight on 27 April, two days before the elections. Fodié Touré, the head of the electoral commission, said on 16 April that more than a thousand foreign observers had sought permission to monitor the election. He said later that 900 observers, from Mali and abroad, had been accredited.

On 24 April the Front for Democracy and the Republic (FDR), a coalition that included four of the opposition candidates (Keïta, Dramé, Maiga, and Sangaré) and 16 parties sharply criticized the way the election was being prepared. It alleged serious problems with the electoral list, which it said had been manipulated, and criticized the use of fingerprints on ballot papers and the failure to allow the presence of its representatives when the military votes. The coalition said that the election would not be transparent or credible. On 28 April local government minister Kafougouna Koné denied the accusation that the government manipulated the electoral list, saying that its problems were due to the lack of information available to the government.

Prior to the election, Touré was considered likely to win; he ran as an independent but was backed by a coalition, the Alliance for Democracy and Progress, composed of 43 parties. Keïta was considered the strongest opposition candidate. If no candidate won the election on 29 April, a second round was scheduled for 13 May.

== Results ==
A day after the elections, a presidential spokesman claimed victory for Touré, while Keïta's campaign director alleged fraud and the FDR claimed there were widespread irregularities. Results accounting for 18.2% of registered voters (including many who did not vote) showed Touré with 61.3% of the vote and Keïta as a distant second with 29.8%. In Bamako, Touré won 54.2% and Keïta won 38.8%; Touré's lead was bigger in rural areas, where he won about 71% against 18% for Keïta. Voter turnout was placed at 24% in Bamako and 38% in the countryside.

On 1 May the four FDR candidates, rejecting the official results, said that they would try to have the election annulled. In a statement, Keïta's campaign said that it would release different results. The FDR withdrew from participation in the national commission for the centralization of the results; it objected to the handling of Bamako's results, saying that it had not been included in part of the validation process and that the results had been released without its approval. Foreign observers, however, endorsed the election as free and fair. Results reported from 28 out of 49 areas showed Touré with 72% of the vote, while Keïta had 15%. On 2 May results accounting for 51% of registered voters (including many who did not vote) showed Touré still holding a large lead with 58.3% of the vote against 25% for Keïta.

According to full provisional results announced on 3 May Touré won the election with 68.31% of the vote (1,563,640 out of 2,288,993 votes) and Keïta took second place with 18.59% (425,609 votes). Dramé was in third place with 2.9% of the vote and Mariko was in fourth with 2.7%. Voter turnout was placed at 36.17%, with 2.3 million out of 6.9 million registered voters participating. On 4 May slightly different results were announced: 70.89% for Touré (1,622,579 votes), 19.08% for Keïta (436,781 votes), 3.04% for Dramé (69,584 votes) 2.74% for Mariko (62,709 votes), 1.57% for Sangaré (35,951 votes), 1.46% for Maïga (33,366 votes), 0.54% for Diallo (12,326 votes), and 0.30% for Maguiraga (6,857 votes).

Diallo and Maguiraga accepted Touré's victory on 4 May. The FDR, however, continued to call on the Constitutional Court to annul the election, describing it as a farce and rejecting the results.

Final results were announced by the Constitutional Court on 12 May, confirming Touré's victory and slightly raising his vote share to 71.20%. On 19 May Keïta said that the FDR would abide by the court's decision and would focus on the July 2007 parliamentary elections. Some observers argued that this concession by the FDR was due to the massive scale of the victory attributed to Touré, which made its own claims appear untenable. In a press conference on 29 May, Mariko denounced the electoral commission and the Constitutional Court for their handling of the election, saying that the former should be dissolved. He was also sharply critical of the FDR, in which he did not participate.

Candidate	Party	Votes	%
Amadou Toumani Touré	Independent	1,612,912	71.20
Ibrahim Boubacar Keïta	Rally for Mali	433,897	19.15
Tiébilé Dramé	Party for National Rebirth	68,956	3.04
Oumar Mariko	African Solidarity for Democracy and Independence	61,670	2.72
Mamadou Blaise Sangaré	Social Democratic Convention	35,776	1.58
Soumeylou Boubèye Maïga	Convergences 2007	32,973	1.46
Sidibé Aminata Diallo	Rally for Education about Sustainable Development	12,443	0.55
Madiassa Maguiraga	Popular Party for Progress	6,856	0.30
Total		2,265,483	100.00
Valid votes		2,265,483	90.81
Invalid/blank votes		229,363	9.19
Total votes		2,494,846	100.00
Registered voters/turnout		6,884,352	36.24
Source: African Elections Database

== Aftermath ==
Touré was sworn in for his second term on 8 June 2007.
