= Child Aid =

Non-profit organization in the US

Child Aid is a 501(c)(3) non-profit based in Portland, Oregon, working to promote literacy in Latin America. According to Child Aid's mission statement, the organization works to "create opportunity for Latin America's rural and indigenous poor through childhood literacy and education programs."

Child Aid works primarily in Guatemala, as it is the country with the lowest literacy rate in Latin America. Child Aid also founded and oversees a speech and hearing center for poor children who are deaf or hard of hearing in Oaxaca, Mexico.

Child Aid again received a four-star rating (the highest given) from Charity Navigator in 2011. Charity Navigator awards four stars to organizations that use their money most efficiently. At Child Aid, over 90% of donations go directly to programs in Latin America.

== History ==
In 1987, founders Rick Carroll and Nancy Press spent time in southern Mexico where they discovered an absence of services for deaf and hard-of-hearing children. They began bringing extra hearing aids to a local doctor in Oaxaca, and over time, CORAL developed. CORAL is now a full service speech and hearing clinic for which Child Aid provides oversight and assistance. Child Aid has since expanded its work to focus on Guatemala where the organization has conducted library and literacy work for over 15 years.

== Reading for Life ==
Child Aid has helped create 35 community libraries and conducts reading programs in more than 50 communities in Guatemala. In those areas, the organization works to improve libraries, train teachers and librarians, and bring reading programs to children who face the highest rate of illiteracy in Latin America. Child Aid's work relies heavily on book donations, as many books in Guatemalan libraries are out of date and irrelevant. They also depend on volunteers who travel to Guatemala to work in libraries, make physical improvements to schools and libraries, or, in some cases, participate directly in training of librarians and teachers.

The flagship program, Reading for Life, consists of three main components. First, Child Aid works to improve libraries in rural Guatemalan communities. The organization has now helped create over 35 libraries. Child Aid connects the libraries with schools and provides training for librarians. The work in libraries is key to creating sustainable learning programs. Another critical element of Child Aid's work is teacher training. Most rural teachers lack the education and training to teach children to read, as many have only the equivalent of a high school diploma. Child Aid provides training and classroom follow-up for hundreds of teachers in rural Guatemala. Books constitute the third component of Reading for Life. Most schools in rural Guatemala lack books altogether, and often the books in libraries are out of date or irrelevant. Child Aid supplies libraries and schools with tens of thousands of Spanish-language books each year.

== Partners ==
=== CORAL ===
In Oaxaca, Child Aid funds an organization called CORAL. CORAL provides early testing, treatment and other services for deaf children so that they may participate fully in their communities.

=== FUNDIT ===
Child Aid also partners with an organization called FUNDIT in Guatemala. FUNDIT provides children with scholarships and supplies so that they may attend school. In 2010 FUNDIT was renamed the Ethical Bean Scholarship Fund.
