= Rally for Education about Sustainable Development =

Political party in Mali

The Rally for Education about Sustainable Development (French: Rassemblement pour l'éducation au développement durable, REDD) is a political party in Mali. Its candidate Sidibé Aminata Diallo contested the presidential election on 29 April 2007, taking seventh place with 0.55% of the vote. Diallo is the first woman to ever contest a presidential election in the country.

The party contested the 2013 parliamentary elections, but failed to win a seat.

== See also ==
- Environmental issues in Mali
