= Jaimie Bleck =

American sociologist

Jaime Bleck

Scholarly work
- Discipline: Sociology
- Institutions: University of Notre Dame

Jaime Bleck is an American sociologist. In 2014–2015, she was an American Council of Learned Societies (ACLS) Fellow.

She is Ford Family Assistant Professor of Political Science at University of Notre Dame.

She spoke at Africa Symposium 2020, of The Wilson Center.

== Works ==
- Education and Empowered Citizenship in Mali, Johns Hopkins University Press, 2015. ISBN 9781421417813
- Nicolas van de Walle, Continuity in Change: Electoral Politics in Africa 1990-2015, Cambridge University Press, 2018.
- Bleck, Jaimie; Michelitch, Kristin (July 2017). "Capturing the Airwaves, Capturing the Nation? A Field Experiment on State-Run Media Effects in the Wake of a Coup". The Journal of Politics. 79 (3): 873–889. doi:10.1086/690616. ISSN 0022-3816.
- "Women's voices in civil society organizations: Evidence from a civil society mapping project in Mali". ebrary.ifpri.org. doi:10.2499/9780896294141.
- Honig, Lauren; Smith, Amy; Bleck, Jamie (2021), Replication Data for: What Stymies Action on Climate Change? Religious Institutions, Marginalization, and Efficacy in Kenya, Amy Smith, Harvard Dataverse, doi:10.7910/dvn/r7xt2d
- Friesen, Paul; Bleck, Jaimie; Fridy, Kevin (April 29, 2022). "Personality, community, and politics: relating the five factor model to political behaviour in an African setting". Commonwealth & Comparative Politics. 60 (2): 190–211. doi:10.1080/14662043.2022.2044653. ISSN 1466-2043.
