= Literate environment =

A literate environment may include written materials (newspapers, books and posters), electronic and broadcast media (radios and TVs) and information and communications technology (phones, computers and Internet access), which encourage literacy acquisition, a reading culture, improved literacy retention and access to information.

Literate environments can be found in both public and private spheres, including home, school, workplace, local community, and the nation as a whole. Developing rich literate environments therefore includes language policies, book publishing, media, and access to information and reading materials.

A rich literate environment is essential for encouraging individuals to become literate and sustain and integrate their newly acquired skills in their everyday lives. The social and cultural environments in which people live and work can be characterized as being either more or less supportive of the acquisition and practice of literacy. In certain developing country contexts, the lack of written material in whatever form is a serious constraint on the practice of literacy.

== Self-directed learning ==
=== Sudbury schools ===
Sudbury Valley School claims that in their school there are plentiful ways to learn to read, and that students rarely ask staff for help.

=== Unschooling ===
Carlo Ricci, Professor of Education and editor of the Journal of Unschooling and Alternative Learning, asserts that kids will become motivated to read because they live in a literate environment.
