= Ahmadou Touré =

Malian politician

To be distinguished from former president of Mali Amadou Toumani Touré Ahmadou Touré is the Minister of Commerce, Mines and Industry of Mali since 24 April 2012.
