= University of Bamako =

Public university in Mali

- Université de Bamako (French)
- Type: public university
- Active: 1996–2011
- Location: Bamako, Bamako Capital District, Mali

The University of Bamako (French: Université de Bamako) was the flagship public university in Bamako, the capital of Mali between 1996 and 2011. It was legally established in 1993 by the merger of existing higher education institutions and became operational in 1996. It was closed in 2011.

The University of Bamako, whose enrollment reached 80,000 students in 2010–2011, was replaced by 4 new independent universities: the University of Social Sciences and Management of Bamako (USSGB), the University of Letters and Human Sciences of Bamako (ULSHB), the University of Sciences, Techniques and Technologies of Bamako (USTTB) and the University of Legal and Political Sciences of Bamako (USJPB) as well as the new school called École Normale d'Enseignement Technique et Professional.

== History ==
Opened in 1996, the university has brought together nine campuses across the city. The institution was created by Law 93-060 of September 1993, but did not launch until November 1996. It was 2000 until the first campus-wide structures were in place. Professor Ginette B. Siby is Recteur, the chief executive officer of the university. In 2000 there were 19,714 students and 538 instructors on all nine campuses. By 2007, the University of Bamako had more than 60,000 students and about 600 instructors.

== Main faculties ==
As of 2007, the university is divided into five faculties and two institutes: The Science and Technology faculty (Faculté des sciences et techniques or FAST), The Medical faculty (Faculté de Médecine, de Pharmacie et d’Odento-Stamologie or FMPOS), the Humanities, Arts, and Social Science faculty (Faculté des Lettres, Langues, Arts et Sciences Humaines or FLASH), the Law and Public Service faculty (Faculté des Sciences Juridiques et Politiques FSJP), the Science of Economy and Management Faculty ("Faculté des Sciences Economiques et de Gestion" or FSEG, the Institute of Management ( "Institut Universitaire de Management" or IUG), and the Higher Training and Applied Research ("Institut Supérieur de Formation et de Recherche Appliquée" or ISFRA).

== Foreign exchange ==
The university has developed an educational network with foreign universities, especially those in Francophone nations. One example is its cosponsorship with the University of Paris VIII of the Five Continents Open University project in 2005.

== See also ==
- List of split up universities
- Education in Mali
