= Outline of Colombia =

Equatorial country in South America

The Flag of Colombia

The Coat of arms of Colombia

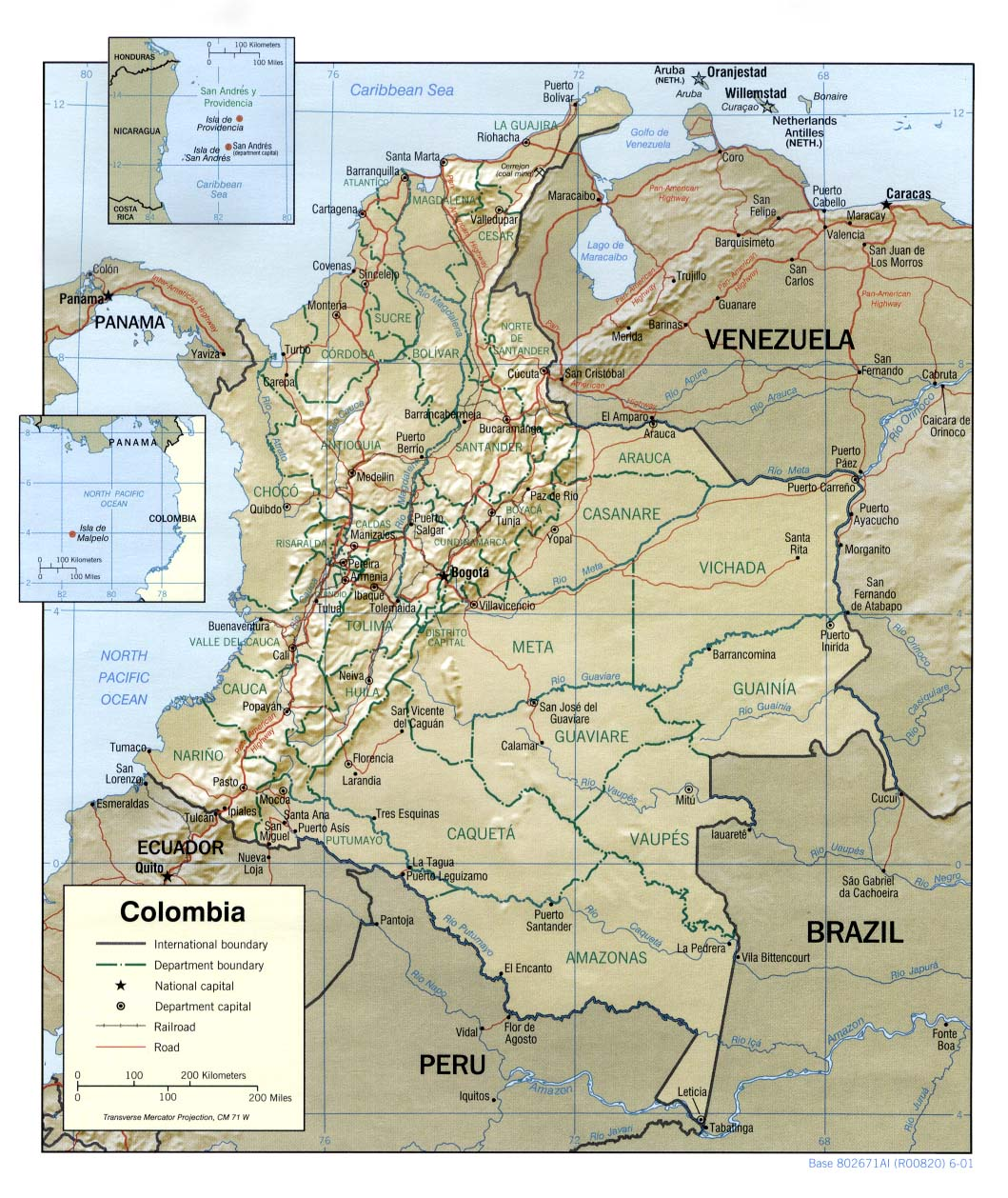
An enlargeable relief map of Colombia

The following outline is provided as an overview of and topical guide to Colombia:

Colombia – tropical equatorial country located in northern South America. It is the most megadiverse country in the world (per square kilometer). The majority of its urban centres are located in the highlands of the Andes mountains, but Colombian territory also encompasses Amazon rainforest, tropical grassland and both Caribbean and Pacific coastlines. Colombia is a middle power, and is the third largest economy in Latin America, and the second largest in South America.

== General reference ==
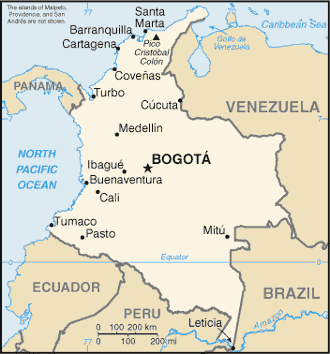
An enlargeable basic map of Colombia

- Pronunciation: /kəˈlʌm.biə/
  - Spanish: [koˈlom.bja]
- Common English country name: Colombia
- Official English country name: The Republic of Colombia
- Common endonym(s): Colombia
- Official endonym(s): República de Colombia
- Adjectival(s): Colombian
- Demonym(s): Colombian
- Etymology: Name of Colombia
- International rankings of Colombia
- ISO country codes: CO, COL, 170
- ISO region codes: See ISO 3166-2:CO
- Internet country code top-level domain: .co

== Geography of Colombia ==
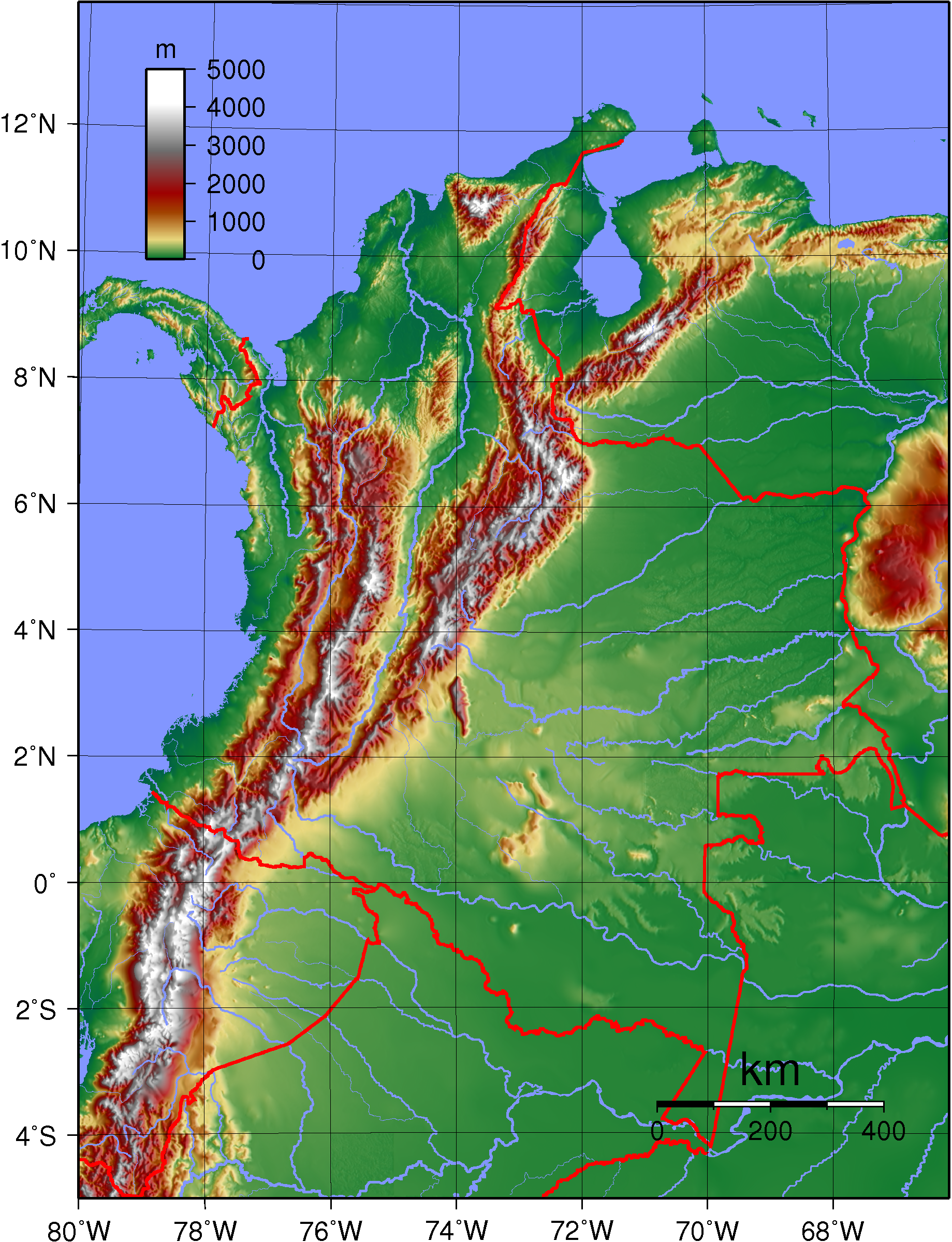
An enlargeable topographic map of Colombia

Geography of Colombia

- Colombia is: a megadiverse country
- Location:
  - Western Hemisphere, on the Equator
    - South America
  - Time in Colombia
    - Time zone: UTC-05
  - Extreme points of Colombia
    - High: Pico Cristóbal Colón 5,700 m (18,701 ft) or Pico Simón Bolívar 5,700 m (18,701 ft)
    - Low: North Pacific Ocean and Caribbean Sea 0 m
  - Land boundaries: 6,309 km

Venezuela 2,050 km
Peru 1,800 km
Brazil 1,644 km
Ecuador 590 km
Panama 225 km

- Coastline: 3,208 km
  - Caribbean Sea 1,760 km
  - North Pacific Ocean 1,448 km

- Population of Colombia: 44,603,000 (October 13, 2008) - 29th most populous country
- Area of Colombia: 1,141,748 km^{2}
- Atlas of Colombia

=== Environment of Colombia ===
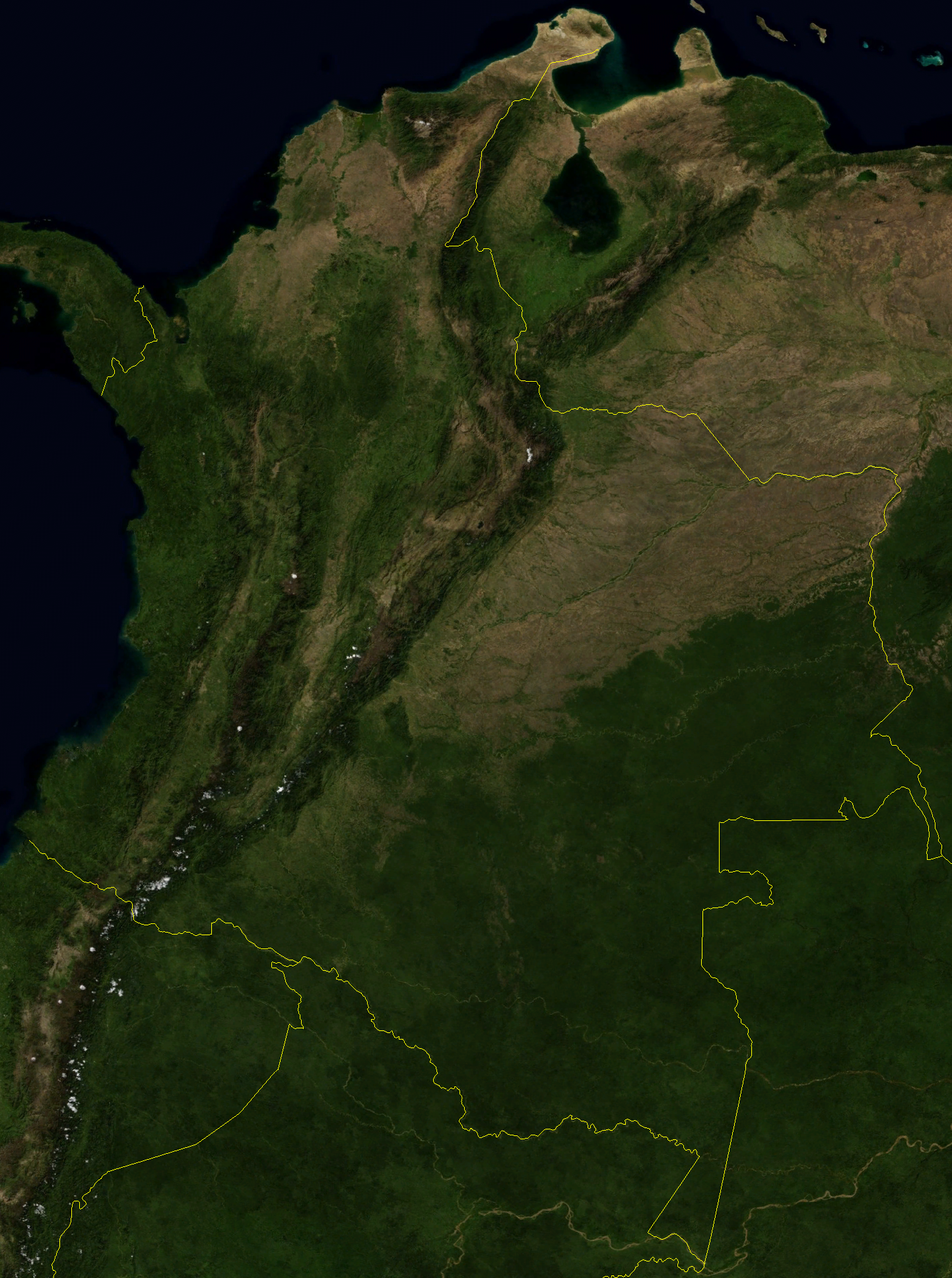
An enlargeable satellite image of Colombia

Environment of Colombia

- Climate of Colombia
- Environmental issues in Colombia
  - Deforestation in Colombia
  - Natural hazards in Colombia
- Ecoregions in Colombia
- Renewable energy in Colombia
- Geology of Colombia
- Protected areas of Colombia
  - Archaeological sites in Colombia
  - Biosphere reserves in Colombia
  - National parks of Colombia
- Wildlife of Colombia
  - Flora of Colombia
  - Fauna of Colombia
    - Birds of Colombia
    - Mammals of Colombia

==== Natural geographic features of Colombia ====
- Glaciers of Colombia
- Islands of Colombia
- Mountains of Colombia
  - Volcanoes in Colombia
- Rivers of Colombia
- World Heritage Sites in Colombia
- Valleys and Plateaus of Colombia

=== Regions of Colombia ===
Natural Regions of Colombia

- Caribbean Region of Colombia

==== Administrative divisions of Colombia ====
===== Departments of Colombia =====

| # | Department Name |
|---|---|
| 1 | Amazonas |
| 2 | Antioquia |
| 3 | Arauca |
| 4 | Atlántico |
| 5 | Bogotá (Capital District) (Note: Bogotá acts as a Capital District and is administratively independent) |
| 6 | Bolívar |
| 7 | Boyacá |
| 8 | Caldas |
| 9 | Caquetá |
| 10 | Casanare |
| 11 | Cauca |
| 12 | Cesar |
| 13 | Chocó |
| 14 | Córdoba |
| 15 | Cundinamarca |
| 16 | Guainía |
| 17 | Guaviare |
| 18 | Huila |
| 19 | La Guajira |
| 20 | Magdalena |
| 21 | Meta |
| 22 | Nariño |
| 23 | Norte de Santander |
| 24 | Putumayo |
| 25 | Quindío |
| 26 | Risaralda |
| 27 | San Andrés, Providencia y Santa Catalina |
| 28 | Santander |
| 29 | Sucre |
| 30 | Tolima |
| 31 | Valle del Cauca |
| 32 | Vaupés |
| 33 | Vichada |

===== Municipalities of Colombia =====

- Capital of Colombia: Bogotá
- Cities of Colombia

=== Demography of Colombia ===
Demographics of Colombia

== Government and politics of Colombia ==
Politics of Colombia

- Form of government: unitary presidential welfare state
- Elections in Colombia
- Political parties in Colombia
- Political scandals of Colombia
- Security issues in Colombia
- Taxation in Colombia
- Trade unions in Colombia

=== Branches of government ===
Government of Colombia

==== Executive branch of the government of Colombia ====
Executive Branch of Colombia

- Head of state and Head of government: President of Colombia
- Vice President of Colombia
- Entities in the executive branch of Colombia
  - Cabinet of Colombia
  - Control Institutions in Colombia
    - Office of the Comptroller General of Colombia
    - Office of the Inspector General of Colombia
    - Ombudsman's Office of Colombia

==== Legislative branch of the government of Colombia ====
Legislative Branch of Colombia

- Congress of Colombia (bicameral)
  - Upper house: Senate of Colombia
  - Lower house: Chamber of Representatives of Colombia

==== Judicial branch of the government of Colombia ====
Judicial Branch of Colombia

- Supreme Court of Colombia
- Constitutional Court of Colombia
- Superior Council of Judicature
- Attorney General of Colombia

=== Foreign relations of Colombia ===
Foreign relations of Colombia

- Diplomatic missions in Colombia
- Diplomatic missions of Colombia
  - Ambassador of Colombia to the United States

==== International organization membership ====
The Republic of Colombia is a member of:

- Agency for the Prohibition of Nuclear Weapons in Latin America and the Caribbean (OPANAL)
- Andean Community of Nations (CAN)
- Caribbean Community and Common Market (Caricom) (observer)
- Caribbean Development Bank (CDB)
- Central American Bank for Economic Integration (BCIE)
- Food and Agriculture Organization (FAO)
- Group of Three (G3)
- Group of 24 (G24)
- Group of 77 (G77)
- Inter-American Development Bank (IADB)
- International Atomic Energy Agency (IAEA)
- International Bank for Reconstruction and Development (IBRD)
- International Chamber of Commerce (ICC)
- International Civil Aviation Organization (ICAO)
- International Criminal Court (ICCt)
- International Criminal Police Organization (Interpol)
- International Development Association (IDA)
- International Federation of Red Cross and Red Crescent Societies (IFRCS)
- International Finance Corporation (IFC)
- International Fund for Agricultural Development (IFAD)
- International Hydrographic Organization (IHO)
- International Labour Organization (ILO)
- International Maritime Organization (IMO)
- International Mobile Satellite Organization (IMSO)
- International Monetary Fund (IMF)
- International Olympic Committee (IOC)
- International Organization for Migration (IOM)
- International Organization for Standardization (ISO)
- International Red Cross and Red Crescent Movement (ICRM)
- International Telecommunication Union (ITU)
- International Telecommunications Satellite Organization (ITSO)
- International Trade Union Confederation (ITUC)
- Inter-Parliamentary Union (IPU)
- Latin American Economic System (LAES)
- Latin American Integration Association (LAIA)
- Multilateral Investment Guarantee Agency (MIGA)
- Nonaligned Movement (NAM)
- Organisation for the Prohibition of Chemical Weapons (OPCW)
- Organization of American States (OAS)
- Permanent Court of Arbitration (PCA)
- Rio Group (RG)
- Southern Cone Common Market (Mercosur) (associate)
- Unión Latina
- United Nations (UN)
- United Nations Conference on Trade and Development (UNCTAD)
- United Nations Educational, Scientific, and Cultural Organization (UNESCO)
- United Nations High Commissioner for Refugees (UNHCR)
- United Nations Industrial Development Organization (UNIDO)
- United Nations Security Council
- Universal Postal Union (UPU)
- World Confederation of Labour (WCL)
- World Customs Organization (WCO)
- World Federation of Trade Unions (WFTU)
- World Health Organization (WHO)
- World Intellectual Property Organization (WIPO)
- World Meteorological Organization (WMO)
- World Tourism Organization (UNWTO)
- World Trade Organization (WTO)

=== Law and order in Colombia ===
Law of Colombia

- Animal rights in Colombia
- Constitution of Colombia
- Crime in Colombia
  - Abortion in Colombia
  - Cannabis in Colombia
  - Domestic violence in Colombia
  - Illegal drug trade in Colombia
  - Kidnappings in Colombia
- Human rights in Colombia
  - Children's rights in Colombia
  - LGBT rights in Colombia
    - Same-sex marriage in Colombia
  - Office of the Inspector General of Colombia
  - Freedom of religion in Colombia
  - Ombudsman's Office of Colombia
  - Prostitution in Colombia
  - Women's rights in Colombia
- Law Enforcement in Colombia

=== Military of Colombia ===
Military of Colombia

- Command
  - Commander-in-chief:
    - Ministry of Defence of Colombia
- Forces
  - Army of Colombia
  - Navy of Colombia
  - Air Force of Colombia
- Military ranks of Colombia

=== Local government in Colombia ===
Local government in Colombia

== History of Colombia ==
=== By period ===
- Armero tragedy

=== By region ===
- History of Cartagena, Colombia

=== By subject ===
- CIA activities in Colombia
- Constitutional history of Colombia
- History of the Colombian National Police
- History of Internet in Colombia
- Postage stamps and postal history of Colombia
- Massacres in Colombia
- Military history of Colombia
  - History of the Revolutionary Armed Forces of Colombia
  - Paramilitarism in Colombia
  - Guerrilla movements in Colombia
  - Timeline of Colombian armed conflict

== Culture of Colombia ==

- Architecture of Colombia
  - Tallest buildings in Colombia
- Carnival in Colombia
- Cuisine of Colombia
  - Colombian cuisine dishes
- Festivals in Colombia
- Humor in Colombia
- Languages of Colombia
- Media in Colombia
  - Television in Colombia
- National symbols of Colombia
  - Coat of arms of Colombia
  - Flag of Colombia
  - National anthem of Colombia
- People of Colombia
  - Colombian diaspora
  - Indigenous peoples in Colombia
  - Minorities in Colombia
    - LGBT in Colombia
    - Arab diaspora in Colombia
- Prostitution in Colombia
- Public holidays in Colombia
- Scouting and guiding in Colombia
- Smoking in Colombia
- World Heritage Sites in Colombia

=== Art in Colombia ===
Art of Colombia

- Artists of Colombia
- Cinema of Colombia
  - Films of Colombia
    - Colombian Academy Award winners and nominees
- Literature of Colombia
  - Writers of Colombia
- Music of Colombia
  - Glossary of Colombian music
- Television in Colombia
  - Television series of Colombia
- Video gaming in Colombia

=== Religion in Colombia ===
- Religion in Colombia
  - Bahá'í Faith in Colombia
  - Christianity in Colombia
    - Roman Catholicism in Colombia
      - Roman Catholic dioceses in Colombia
  - Hinduism in Colombia
  - Islam in Colombia

=== Sports in Colombia ===
Sports in Colombia

- Football in Colombia
  - Football clubs in Colombia
  - Football stadiums in Colombia
- Colombia at the Olympics
- Rugby union in Colombia
  - Underwater rugby in Colombia

== Economy and infrastructure of Colombia ==
Economy of Colombia

- Economic rank, by nominal GDP (2007): 40th (fortieth)
- Agriculture in Colombia
  - Coca production in Colombia
  - Coffee production in Colombia
  - Irrigation in Colombia
- Banking in Colombia
  - Bank of the Republic
- Communications in Colombia
  - Internet in Colombia
    - Latin America and Caribbean Network Information Centre
  - Postal codes in Colombia
  - Telephone numbers in Colombia
- Companies of Colombia
- Currency of Colombia: Peso
  - ISO 4217: COP
- Energy in Colombia
  - Hydroelectric power in Colombia
  - Power stations in Colombia
- Health in Colombia
  - Health care in Colombia
  - Hospitals in Colombia
  - Medicine in Colombia
- Industry of Colombia
- Mining in Colombia
- Poverty in Colombia
- Science and technology in Colombia
- Tourism in Colombia
- Transport in Colombia
  - Rapid transit in Colombia
  - Airports in Colombia
  - Rail transport in Colombia
    - Railway stations in Colombia
  - Roads in Colombia
    - Highways in Colombia
- Colombian Stock Exchange
- Water supply and sanitation in Colombia
  - Water privatization in Colombia
  - Water resources management in Colombia

== Education in Colombia ==
Education in Colombia

- Schools in Colombia
- Universities in Colombia

== See also ==
Colombia

- List of Colombia-related topics
- Member state of the United Nations
- Outline of South America
