= Abortion in Colombia =

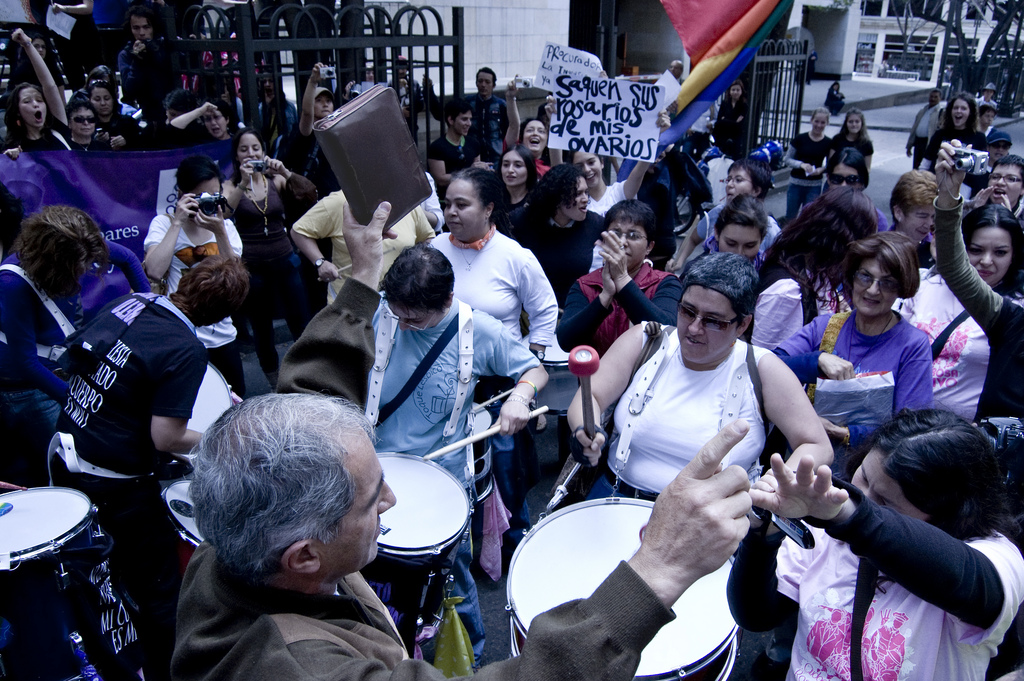
Pro-choice protest in Colombia, 2009

Abortion in Colombia is legal and available upon request, without needing to provide a reason, up to the 24th week of pregnancy, due to a ruling by the Constitutional Court on February 21, 2022. Later in pregnancy, it is only allowed in cases of risk of death to the pregnant woman, fetal malformation, or rape, according to a Constitutional Court ruling in 2006.

== History ==
The 1837 and 1936 penal legislation authorized therapeutic abortion while banning all other forms of abortion, regardless of whether the abortion was consented to or not. The 1890 Penal Code, in article 640, allowed for abortion when it was absolutely necessary to save the mother's life, but stated that the law did not recommend such means, which were "generally condemned" by the Catholic Church, the official religion at the time. In all other cases, a third party who attempted to abort a fetus without the woman's consent faced three to six years' imprisonment (five to ten years if the abortion was successful) or one to three years imprisonment if the woman consented (four to eight years if the abortion was successful). If a medical professional, midwife, or apothecary was found guilty of the above crimes, the sentence would be increased by six months to a year. The law also provided for reduced sentences, of 3–6 months (5–10 months if the abortion was successful), in the case of "honest women of good reputation" who received an abortion to "conceal their frailty" (aborto honoris causa).

A very conservative 1922 law to reform the penal code would have eliminated therapeutic abortion and punished women who sought an abortion but maintained the aborto honoris causa, but the law never entered into force. The aborto honoris causa, a legal concept inherited from Spain and Italy, was based on the opinion that a single mother had lost her honour. The 1936 Penal Code differentiated between consented abortion (one to four years imprisonment for the woman and practitioner) and abortion not consented to (one to six years for the practitioner), maintaining provisions for a reduced sentence (reduced by one-half to two-thirds) or full pardon for an abortion to save one's honour or that of the mother, sister, woman, her descendants, or adopted girl.

The 1980 Penal Code, in articles 343 to 345, removed the aborto honoris causa and adopted penalties and attenuating circumstances which would be largely retained by the current penal code, adopted in 2000.

Decree 100 of 1980. (Penal Code)

"ARTICLE 343. ABORTION. The woman who causes her abortion or allows another to cause it, shall be in prison for one to three years.

The same sanction shall be subject to who, with the consent of the woman, performs the act provided for in the preceding paragraph."

=== Sentence C-133 of 1994 ===
The constitutionality of Article 343 of the 1980 Penal Code was challenged before the Constitutional Court in 1994, which ruled in favour of the article criminalizing abortion in sentence C-133 of March 17, 1994. The majority opinion of the court contended the 1991 Constitution, which recognizes life as a fundamental right (in article 11) and cites it as one of the founding principles in the constitutional preamble and article 2, recognized the "primacy and inviolability of life", excluding any possibility for abortion and allowing the legislator to penalize such acts. Furthermore, it opined that "the life of the unborn embodies a fundamental value, for the hope of its existence as a person, and its apparent helplessness requires special attention from the State." Thus, Colombia's abortion legislation was constitutional under the State's obligation to protect the life of "all persons", which, at the time, the Court claimed "obviously" protected life during its formation and development given that these stages were condition for the viability of birth, the origin of the legal existence of a person. In addition, the Court said, if the Constitution gives couples the right to decide their number of children, this right could only be exercised prior to conception since conception creates a being which is existentially distinct from the mother.

=== Legal situation prior to 2006 ===
Abortion was legally regulated by articles 122 through 124 of the Colombian Penal Code (law 599 of 2000). Article 122 of the Penal Code punished women who self-induced or consented to someone else inducing her abortion to imprisonment for a period of one to three years, increased to a term of 16 to 54 months by law 890 of 2004. Article 123 punished those who practised an abortion without the woman's consent or on a girl under fourteen years of age to a period of imprisonment of 4 to 10 years, increased to 64 to 180 months by the 2004 law. Article 124, finally, allowed for attenuating circumstances: the prescribed penalty for abortion would be reduced by three quarters when the pregnancy was the result of rape or non-consensual artificial insemination.

In 2006, Colombia decriminalized abortion in cases where "a pregnancy threatens a woman's physical, mental, emotional, or social health, involves severe fetal malformations, or is the result of rape, incest, or unwanted insemination." However, there was inconsistent implementation of the right to an abortion under these conditions. To attain an abortion, women filed a tutela, a constitutional writ, which was subsequently reviewed by a judge who could allow or deny the abortion.

=== Legislation (2015–current) ===
In November 2015, Attorney General Eduardo Montealegre announced that he would send a bill to Congress legalizing abortion on request in the first 12 weeks of pregnancy. The Minister of Health, Alejandro Gaviria, supported legalizing abortion but said that Montealegre's bill was not the most suitable mechanism to do so, claiming instead that the obstacles were not legal but rather disinformation and cultural factors.

On March 14, 2020 the Colombian Constitutional Court issued a decision regarding a claim received against the current law which requested a complete ban on abortions. The claim argued that abortion was unconstitutional and limited the rights of the unborn. The Court ruled against banning all abortions, upholding the current requirements for the procedure.

Abortion in Colombia has been historically severely restricted, with the laws being loosened in 2006 and 2009 (before 2006 Colombia was one of few countries in the world to have a complete ban on abortion); and in 2022 abortion on request was legalized to the 24th week of pregnancy, by a ruling of the Constitutional Court on February 21, 2022. Up until that point, women who had abortions in this largely Catholic nation faced sentences ranging from 16 to 54 months in prison. According to this decision, women may obtain an abortion up until the sixth month of pregnancy for any reason. A 2006 court decision that also allowed doctors to refuse to perform abortions based on personal beliefs stated that this was previously only permitted in cases of rape, if the mother's health was in danger, or if the fetus had an untreatable malformation.

== Martha Sulay González's case ==
In 2006, the case of Pereira woman Martha Sulay González brought national attention to the issue of abortion in the country. González, already a mother of three, was diagnosed with cervical cancer while pregnant with her fourth child in 2004 (despite prior tubal ligation). Her requests for chemotherapy and radiotherapy were denied, as they would entail the termination of her pregnancy, which was illegal. Her doctors said that they decided to continue her pregnancy because, although medical literature indicated that in such cases the pregnancy should be ignored and radiotherapy started, therapeutic abortion is illegal in Colombia and they would be committing a crime. Her cancer metastasized in 2006. However, experts in medical law argued that an abortion in her case would not have been penalized, as one would not be seeking the death of the fetus but rather to save the mother's life.

== Court challenges ==
Martha Sulay González, supported by local and national groups, continued to demand the decriminalization of abortion in Colombia. Beginning in April 2005, several lawyers, led by Mónica Roa of the Women's Link Worldwide NGO, challenged the constitutionality of the abortion-related articles of the Penal Code to the Constitutional Court. The court consolidated three separate challenges into a single case. Mónica Roa's brief claimed that the ban on abortion violated a woman's constitutional right to the free development of her personality (libre desarrollo de la personalidad) and autonomy, because the State was preventing her from deciding freely on issues which pertained solely to her. She further suggested that the legislation was disproportional, violated a woman's right to equality (by criminalizing a medical practice only needed by women, while the denial of an abortion was a clear example of discrimination against women violating their constitutional rights to health and life). Besides article 122 of the Penal Code, Roa also challenged the phrase in article 123 which subjected those who practised abortions on minors under fourteen to a higher prison sentence, as she said it violated a young girl's constitutionally-recognized autonomy. Finally, Roa challenged the entirety of article 124, because merely initiating criminal proceedings for an abortion in the face of sexual violence was violation of a woman's dignity, freedom and autonomy.

Supporting her arguments, Roa also argued that clandestine abortions threatened a woman's life and cited several opinions from international organizations and international human rights instruments (which are of constitutional value and legally binding in Colombian constitutional law). Other constitutional arguments presented in favour of decriminalization included the secularism of the State, gender equality, human dignity, the right to intimacy and the freedom of conscience.

Religious opposition to abortion was particularly intense during the court challenge, particularly from the Catholic Church and Opus Dei, as well their allies in Congress. During the 2006 presidential campaign, incumbent President Álvaro Uribe said that he opposed abortion, but most of his rivals, including eventual second-place finisher Carlos Gaviria, a former Constitutional Court magistrate, supported abortion rights and the legal challenge to the Penal Code.

The Colombian Institute of Family Welfare (ICBF) opposed abortion as a family planning measure, but gave a favourable opinion to the decriminalization of abortion in certain cases. In its intervention before the Court, the Ombudsman (Defensor del Pueblo), an autonomous constitutional control organization, supported the legal challenge against the ban on abortion. Like other contributors, the Ombudsman claimed that the law was based on a retrograde view of women as "merely biological", ignoring modern constitutional provisions for gender equality. The Ministry of Social Protection primarily mentioned the public health risks associated with clandestine abortions to support its opinion that restrictive laws like those in Colombia were not efficient in any way in reducing unwanted pregnancies.

The Episcopal Conference of Colombia opposed the decriminalization of abortion, arguing that the impugned articles of the Penal Code protected the life, health and integrity of the unborn but also of the mother. The Magisterium assailed modern notions of liberty where people take as their sole and indisputable reference for their own choices, "not the truth about good and evil, but only their subjective and changeable opinion or even their selfish and whimsical interest", leading to the loss of any reference to common values and to a state where everything is negotiable, "even the first of the fundamental rights, the right to life." The Episcopal Conference argued that the "original and inalienable right to life" could not be subject to political debate, and stated that to "claim the right to abortion, to infanticide ..., means attributing to human freedom a perverse and evil significance: absolute power over and against others." Notably, opponents of the challenge to the law brought attention to the American Convention on Human Rights, which states in article 4.1 that "Every person has the right to have his life respected. This right shall be protected by law and, in general, from the moment of conception." In addition to this formal intervention, the Constitutional Court received a written contribution signed by all the Archbishops in Colombia, including Pedro Rubiano Sáenz, Archbishop of Bogotá, urging the Court to rule the articles constitutional.

The Inspector General of Colombia, Edgardo Maya Villazón, asked the Court to decriminalize abortion in the cases of maternal health, life-threatening foetal defects and conception without the woman's consent (in legal terms, ruling article 122 conditionally constitutional). Constitutionally, the Inspector General held that the right to life must be balanced with and interpreted alongside the principle of human dignity. The Inspector General concluded that criminalizing abortion in the aforementioned cases constituted an unreasonable and disproportionate sanction, interfering with a woman's fundamental rights.

== Sentence C-355 of 2006 ==
On May 10, 2006, the Constitutional Court reached a 5–3 decision which partially decriminalized abortion in Colombia under certain circumstances.

The majority opinion examined several constitutional and legal issues pertaining to life and fundamental rights, including:

- Life and the right to live: The Court held that the Colombian Constitution not only protected the right to life but also recognized life as a value, which implied a duty for the State to protect life. However, if the legislators are allowed to adopt appropriate measures to comply with this duty, this does not mean that all measures adopted in this sense are necessarily justified, because life does not have the character of an absolute value or right and must be weighted with other constitutional values, principles and rights. The right to life (article 11 of the Constitution) is limited to human beings, while the protection of life as a value extends to the unborn.
- Life in international human rights law: The Court considered the protection of the right to life in several international human rights treaties which hold constitutional status in Colombia as part of the 'constitutional bloc'. The International Covenant on Civil and Political Rights and the Convention on the Rights of the Child explicitly state that the right to life is held by the human person. The aforementioned American Convention on Human Rights states that the right to life must be protected by life, "in general" from the moment of conception; but the Court held that this was not of an absolute nature, notably because the terms "in general" contemplates possibilities in which the law does not protect life from the moment of conception.
- Women's rights in the Colombian Constitution and international law: Gender equality and women's rights were constitutionally recognized in 1991, while international human rights conventions and legal instruments have protected women's reproductive rights and recognized violence against women as one of the most serious crimes.
- Limits to the legislator's powers in criminal matters: While the Colombian legislator enjoys a wide margin of freedom in determining criminal law, this power is not unlimited. Criminal legislation must respect fundamental rights, constitutional principles and the legal principles of proportionality and reasonableness. Some of the constitutional limits to the legislator's power to legislate include human dignity (which, for women, includes the right to freely determine her life), the free development of personality (libre desarrollo de la personalidad, individual autonomy) the right to health (which, for women, includes reproductive health) and international law.

Concretely, the Court ruled that the total ban on abortion in Article 122 of the Penal Code was unconstitutional. While the life of the unborn is protected by the constitutional order, the Court considered that the legislator is not obligated to adopt criminal laws to protect the life of the unborn, although it also stated that such measures were not disproportionate. However, a complete ban on abortion meant the complete dominance of one legal interest (the life of the unborn) over all others, specifically the fundamental rights of the mother. The Colombian Constitution, in the Court's opinion, is characterized by the coexistence of several values, principles and rights – none of which have an absolute value against the others. Therefore, the ban on abortion was therefore unconstitutional, as it completely ignored the dignity of the mother and reduced her to "a mere receptacle of unborn life, lacking rights or constitutionally relevant interests meriting protection." Article 124, which imposed a reduced sentence on the mother in cases of rape, was also ruled to be unconstitutional because it was disproportionate. As a result, the Court ruled that abortion should be permitted in cases where the pregnancy is the result of rape, artificial insemination without consent, incest, if the pregnancy threatens the life and health (physical and mental) of the woman and in cases of foetal malformations rendering the fetus inviable.

The Court also struck down the phrase "or in women younger than fourteen" in Article 123, which subjected those who practised an abortion on a woman younger than fourteen to a longer jail sentence. Prior constitutional jurisprudence had recognized that minors had the right, depending on their maturity, to consent to medical interventions or treatments.

The Court concluded by stating that it had limited itself to noting the three 'extreme scenarios' which violated the Constitution, and that nothing prevents the legislator from decriminalizing abortion in other circumstances.

== Barriers and obstacles to abortion ==
Despite the decriminalization of abortion in several women's groups and the Constitutional Court have identified a number of barriers imposed on women seeking a legal abortion. These include requests for additional requirements to those set forth by sentence C-355/06, unfounded conscientious objections and medical boards unjustifiably delaying the procedure by more than 5 days (the limit estimated by the Court to respond to a woman's request).

In October 2009, the Constitutional Court heard the case of a woman who was diagnosed with a severe fetal malformation that was incompatible with life, but her healthcare provider would only authorize an abortion if a judge granted a judicial order to do so (a condition not required under the law), which the judge did not grant because of conscientious objections. The court's ruling reiterated that neither institutions nor judicial authorities can refuse a woman an abortion based on conscience claims, and stated that, under the circumstances where an abortion is legal, women "enjoy a right to decide, free from any pressure, coercion, urging, manipulation and, in general, any sort of inadmissible intervention, to terminate a pregnancy … it is forbidden to raise any obstacles, requirements or additional barriers."

== Statistics ==
In October 2013 the Guttmacher Institute reported an estimated 400,400 induced abortions were performed in Colombia in 2008, of which only 322 were reported as legal procedures. These numbers are much higher than the official statistics reported by the Ministry of Health, which indicated that 15,000 abortions were performed in Colombia between 2009 and 2012. In Bogotá, according to the District Department of Health, there were 16,947 legal abortions carried out in the city between 2006 and 2013. The most commonly cited reasons for legal abortion procedures in Bogotá were mental health (52.8%) and physical health (27.8%).

According to the Prosecutor's Office, 2,290 women were criminalized for abortion between 2005 and 2017. Of these, 502 are minors and in addition to the three girls aged 11 and 12, there are 499 between the ages of 14 and 18 who have had to answer to justice. Approximately 25.2% of women penalized for abortion in Colombia are minors.

== Supreme court decision on a lawsuit ==
On March 2, 2020, the Constitutional Court of Colombia declared itself inhibited and incompetent to issue a ruling regarding a lawsuit against the current decree that authorizes abortion only in three specific cases and that the lives of the mother and baby are endangered. The lawsuit asked to allow abortion without restrictions. The court said it did not have enough arguments to issue the Judgment.

On February 21, 2022, the Constitutional Court of Colombia declared that abortion cannot be a crime under Colombian law, if the abortion takes place within the first 24 weeks of pregnancy.

== See also ==
- Abortion by country
- Abortion law
