= Institute of Hydrology, Meteorology and Environmental Studies (Colombia) =

Colombian government agency

- Instituto de Hidrología, Meteorología y Estudios Ambientales
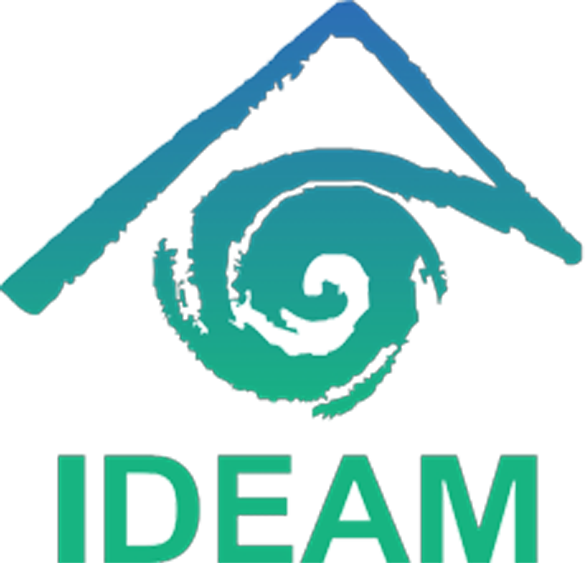

Agency overview
- Formed: 22 December 1993; 32 years ago
- Preceding agency: Instituto Colombiano de Hidrología, Meteorología y Adecuación de Tierras
- Headquarters: Carrera 10 № 20-30 Bogotá, Colombia
- Annual budget: COP$50,689,400,000 (2012); COP$60,814,100,000 (2013); COP$72,937,566,000 (2014)
- Agency executive: Minister; General Director
- Parent agency: Ministry of Environment and Sustainable Development
- Website: www.ideam.gov.co

The Institute of Hydrology, Meteorology and Environmental Studies (Spanish: Instituto de Hidrología, Meteorología y Estudios Ambientales), also known by its acronym in Spanish, IDEAM, is a government agency of the Ministry of Environment and Sustainable Development of Colombia. It is in charge of producing and managing the scientific and technical information on the environment of Colombia, and its territorial composition. The IDEAM also serves as the Colombian institute of meteorology and studies the climate of Colombia. The agency is currently led by the Director General, forestry engineer Yolanda González Hernandez. González Hernández is a specialist in Geographic Information Systems with a Masters in Meteorology Sciences from the National University of Colombia, and is the first woman to lead the agency.

== Creation ==
It was created on December 22, 1993, when Congress passed Law 99 of 1993, replacing the Colombian Institute of Hydrology, Meteorology, and Land Management (Instituto Colombiano de Hidrología, Meteorología y Adecuación de Tierras - HIMAT), and it officially started functioning on March 1, 1995.

== Role ==
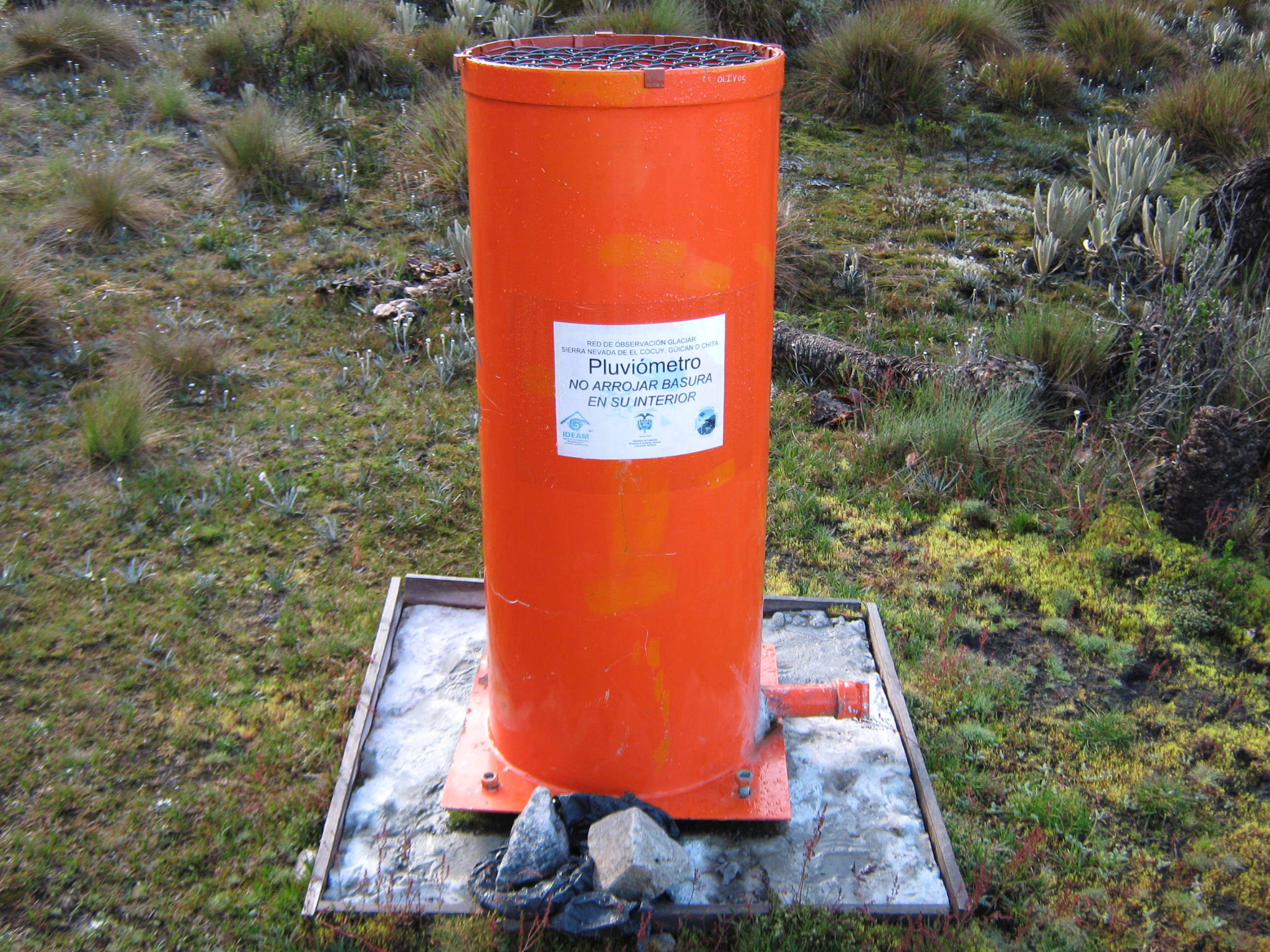
IDEAM Pluviometer, located at the Sierra Nevada del Cocuy natural park.

The IDEAM is in charge of gathering and handling specialized information about the different ecosystems found in Colombia; it also establishes technical parameters to promote an adequate use of land use and planning

The institute is charged with obtaining, analyzing, processing and divulging information pertaining to hydrology, hydrogeology, meteorology, and geography of biophysical, geomorphological aspects, and the vegetation and land area to improve the use and care of the biophysical resources or the country.

The IDEAM also manages the operation and location of the meteorological and hydrological bases within the country, in order to collect information, forecasts, alerts and advice on the behavior of the climate to the population. It is in charge of monitoring the country's biophysical resources on issues related to their contamination and degradation, crucial for decisions made by environmental authorities. It also functions as the entity that fulfills the task of the Institute of Meteorology for the study of climate.
