= Domestic violence in Colombia =

Domestic violence in Colombia, although prohibited by law, remains a serious problem. Since the 1990s, Colombia has started to tackle this problem. Article 42 of the Constitution of Colombia provides that “Family relations are based on the equality of rights and duties of the couple and on the mutual respect of all its members. Any form of violence in the family is considered destructive of its harmony and unity, and will be sanctioned according to law.” Acts of domestic violence can be charged under a variety of laws, and victims can obtain protection orders. Despite this, the prevailing view continues to be that domestic violence should be treated as a "private" matter; and the laws are often unenforced.

== Laws ==
In the 1990s, Colombia enacted Ley 294 de 1996, in order to fight domestic violence. In 2008, Ley 1257 de 2008, a comprehensive law against violence against women was enacted. Marital rape was criminalized in 1996.

Although Colombia has many laws against domestic violence, under specific legislation, and also under the Penal Code, public opinion continues to see domestic violence as something private, that must be solved without legal punishment: a study found that 64% of public officials in Colombia said that if it were in their hands to solve a case of intimate partner violence, the action they would take would be to encourage the parties to reconcile.

== Extent ==
The Institute for Legal Medicine and Forensic Science reported approximately 33,000 cases of domestic violence against women during 2006. It noted that only a small percentage of cases were brought to its attention. The law stipulates that the government must provide victims of domestic violence with immediate protection from physical or psychological abuse. The ICBF provided safe houses and counseling for victims, but its services were dwarfed by the magnitude of the problem.

In addition to fulfilling traditional family counseling functions, ICBF family ombudsmen handled domestic violence cases. The Colombia Ombudsman's Office of Human Rights conducted regional training workshops to promote the application of domestic violence statutes.

== See also ==
- Crime in Colombia
- Women's rights in Colombia
