= International rankings of Colombia =

This is a list of international rankings of Colombia.

== Crime and Safety ==
As of 2023, the United States of America OSAC Country Security Report advises that travelers reconsider visiting Colombia due to crime and terrorism. The report assesses Bogota a critical-threat location and Cartagena as a high-threat location.

== Demographics ==
- Immigrant population ranked 112 most immigrants
- Population ranked 27

== Economy ==
Colombian GDP growth 2001-2007

- List of countries by GDP (World Bank): 44th largest economy in the world (2022)

== Environment ==
- Happy Planet Index (New Economics Foundation): 3rd (2012, 2016, 2019)

== Health ==
- List of countries by life expectancy (World Factbook): 129th longest life expectancy in the world, with a life expectancy of 74.9 years (2023)

== Human development ==
- List of countries by Human Development Index (United Nations Development Programme): 88th highest Human Development in the world (2021)

== Politics ==
- Failed States Index (Fund For Peace): 59th (2023), 67th out of 178 (2016), 46th (2010)
- Corruption Perceptions Index (Transparency International): 87th (2023), 90th out of 176 (2016), 75th (2009)
- Press Freedom Index (Reporters Without Borders): 139th (2023), 134th (2016)
- Global Peace Index (Institute for Economics and Peace): 144th out of 163 (2021)

== Society ==
- Quality-of-life index (Economist Intelligence Unit): 54th (2005)
- Satisfaction with Life Index (University of Leicester): 34th (2006)
- Suicide rate: 73rd
- Beer consumption per capita: 35th (2004)
- Coffee consumption per capita: 58th (2008)

== Technology ==
- World Intellectual Property Organization: Global Innovation Index 2026 ranked 78 out of 139 countries

== Tourism ==
- Travel and Tourism Competitiveness Report (World Economic Forum): 58th (2021), 72nd (2009)

== See also ==
- Outline of Colombia
