= Lissette Ochoa domestic violence case =

Infamous domestic violence case

The Lissette Ochoa domestic violence case is one of the best known cases of spousal abuse in Colombia because of the couple's elite social status and for the brutality of the battering perpetrated on Lissette Ochoa by her husband, Rafael Dangond.

== Events ==
On 29 July 2006, Rafael Dangond and Lissette Ochoa attended a wedding party at the exclusive Country Club in the city of Barranquilla, Colombia. Dangond became aggressive after Ochoa was invited to dance by a group of friends who had traveled from Venezuela to attend the wedding, among them a young male who danced with her. Some of the wedding guests recounted that while Ochoa was dancing, Dangond was sitting alone at a table. He later walked towards the bathroom and then came out with reddened eyes, presumably caused by alcohol and/or drugs. Apparently, Dangond had become angry and jealous.

When Ochoa returned to her seat, Dangond immediately ordered her to exit the building. Once outside, he began battering her and pushed her into their car, where the beating continued. The time at that point was approximately 2:00 AM. He then drove the car erratically around the city while hitting her for more than two hours. When they arrived home at approximately 4:00 AM, the violence continued. Ochoa desperately locked herself in the bathroom and used a cellphone to call her father, Jorge Álvaro Ochoa, who told her he was on his way to her apartment. She warned him that Dangond was armed and was yelling threats about killing himself, her, and her father. At that moment, Dangond knocked the door down and fired his weapon, and the bullet scratched Ochoa's armpit.

When her father arrived at the building, she had managed to exit the apartment, whereafter she met with him. He recounted looking at her as if she were a character from the film The Exorcist, for her eyes were purple and swollen, her upper lip was touching her nose, and she had come out crawling. Jorge immediately tried to report the incident to the police, but was told to return later in the morning when the person in charge of such cases arrived – negligence that he and others would later criticize in the media. He then took her to a clinic in which she would spend more than a month due to multiple physical traumas she had suffered, mainly to her head. Doctor Humberto Caiaffa, who cared for Ochoa there, said she had multiple fractures and had arrived at the clinic in a "lamentable" state.

== National attention ==
The case gained notoriety thanks in part to Ochoa's aunt, Astrid Amador, who took pictures of her during the wedding and afterwards at the hospital. She e-mailed the pictures, and the story then began to spread until the most influential Colombian news media had reported the event and produced numerous other reports of cases of this type, which had been widely ignored in Colombia. The investigation on the case was initiated, and Ochoa also filed for divorce.

== Husband jailed and released ==
On 4 August 2006, Dangond turned himself in to authorities after a brief absentia and was jailed in El Bosque Prison for three months. On 17 November 2006, he was formally accused, by Ochoa's family members in a sectional attorney's office in Barranquilla, of assault and battery, homicide intent, and carrying an illegal weapon. The attorney later decided on the case and absented himself from a final resolution and revoked the preventive detention, temporarily setting Dangond free. He was sentenced to five years in jail for attempted murder and for assaulting his wife.

== SoHo magazine article ==
Ochoa wrote an article called "¡Nunca más!" ("Never again!") in the Colombian SoHo magazine, telling her side of the story. She called men who were violent toward women beasts and recalled her married life of nine years, during which she had had two children with Dangond. She also mentioned that there had previously been incidents where he was violent to a lesser extent toward her – incidents that she had dismissed and which had escalated to a point that had almost gotten her killed.

== Public apology and reunion ==
On 1 December 2006, Dangond acknowledged that he had drug addiction and psychological problems, including personality issues, and that they had also affected their two children. He publicly apologized to his wife and his family for the events of that night, saying he still loved her, as well as apologizing to society in general. He also publicly thanked her for giving him a second opportunity to rejoin her as her husband.

== See also ==
- Women's rights in Colombia
