= Martha Gonzalez =

Martha Sulay Gonzalez (1971 – June 11, 2007) was a Colombian woman whose case instigated reforms on the strict abortion law in Colombia. In 2005, Gonzalez fell pregnant with her fourth child. A gynecological examination showed that she had uterine cancer. She needed radiation therapy, but was denied because this would have terminated her pregnancy. By the time she gave birth, the cancer had metastasized to her intestine. The cancer killed her on June 11, 2007.

== Judgment C-355 ==
Martha's pregnancy and fight for abortion resulted in the judgment C-355 of 10 May 2006 of the Court Constitutional of Colombia that allowed abortion in Colombia. Before the case, abortion had been declared illegal, under all circumstances. Abortion was not only illegal, but it was also frowned upon by other Colombians. After judgment C-355, abortion was allowed in three specific situations: malformation of the fetus, pregnancy due to rape, or when the life of the mother is in danger. The third situation was instigated entirely from the gonzalez case. The court judgement ruled in favor of Gonzalez, but the legalization could no longer help her.

== Pregnancy ==
Although, Martha Sulay had had a tubal ligation, meaning that she could not have children, she fell pregnant. She was already the mother of three daughters. By the fourth week of her pregnancy she was found to have cervical cancer. Chemotherapy was the only solution, otherwise Martha would die. But the chemotherapy would end the pregnancy. It was denied because of the illegality of abortion. The pregnancy continued and Martha gave birth to her fourth daughter, by then the cancer had spread into several organs.

== Gonzalez Case ==
Martha Sulay Gonzalez continued pushing for the legal changes necessary to legally access abortion in Colombia. She fought for women's rights in Colombia. Although her fight was already lost, she kept fighting so that her case did not repeat itself in the future. Abortion laws in Colombia took this long to reform because of the high level of Catholicism in Colombia. The religion and its followers frowned upon the procedure. Finally, The case concluded in the judgment of the Court Constitutional C - 355 of October 2006. This judgment legalizes abortion in Colombia, but only in three specific situations: alleged malformation of the fetus, pregnancy product of rape, or when in danger the life of the mother . The statement did not benefit Martha Sulay, it was too late, the disease was already too advanced. She died on November of June 2007, she was 37 years old.

== See also ==
- Abortion in Colombia
- Abortion
- Abortion by country
- Abortion law

== Additional Sources ==
- Expert, Assisted Dying. “Martha Sulay Gonzalez.” Commission on Assisted Dying, 20 Feb. 2017, www.commissiononassisteddying.co.uk/martha-sulay-gonzalez/.
- Bentacur, Carlos Mario Molina. “El Derecho Al Aborto En Colombia: El Concepto Jur.” Google Libros, Google, 2006, books.google.es/books?id=NGhsrqKC3jQC.

In-text Citation

- “Reproductive Rights Prof Blog.” Law Professor Blogs Network, LPB Network, 20 July 2007, lawprofessors.typepad.com/reproductive_rights/2007/07/martha-solay-go.html.

In-text Citation
