= .co =

Top-level Internet domain for Colombia

- Introduced: December 24, 1991; 34 years ago
- TLD type: Country code top-level domain
- Status: Active
- Registry: Equipo Punto CO
- Sponsor: Equipo Punto CO
- Intended use: Entities connected with Colombia
- Actual use: Popular in Colombia and internationally Sometimes used in typosquatting due to misspellings of .com domains
- Registered domains: 2,018,450 (2016)
- Registration restrictions: None for .co, .com.co, and .net.co
- Structure: Top-level registration now permitted.
- Documents: Registration policies
- Dispute policies: UDRP
- DNSSEC: yes
- Registry website: www.registry.co (English and Spanish) www.registrocolombia.co (restricted domains; Spanish only)

.co is the Internet country code top-level domain (ccTLD) assigned to Colombia.

It is administered by .CO Internet S.A.S., a subsidiary of Neustar since 2014. As of July 10, 2010, there were no registration restrictions on second-level .co domains; any individual or entity in the world can register a .co domain.

.CO Internet S.A.S. from Bogotá, Colombia, was appointed as the manager for the .co TLD through a public procurement process that took place in early 2009. .CO Internet received the re-delegation approval as the manager of the .co TLD by ICANN on December 9, 2009, and received formal confirmation of the request by the United States Department of Commerce on December 23, 2009.

Google treats .co as a generic top-level domain (gTLD) because "users and website owners frequently see [the domain] as being more generic than country-targeted".

== Second-level domain names ==
When they took over administration of the .CO domain, .CO Internet S.A.S. implemented new domain policies that were more flexible than the historic ones that had been administered by the University of the Andes. The new policies were adjusted to international best practices and defined in consultation with local and international communities. With the new policies, Colombia would be able to sell second-level domain names to the world, such as widgets.co, where previously only third-level domain-names were available, such as widgets.com.co.

Notable single letter .CO domain names that have been allocated include:

[a.co]	Amazon
[b.co]	Bestseller.com
[g.co]	Google
[m.co]	Volvo Car Mobility
[o.co]	Overstock.com
[s.co]	Snapchat
[t.co]	X (formerly Twitter)
[y.co]	Y.CO - The Yacht Company

On September 15, 2010, .CO Internet S.A.S. had taken registrations for over 500,000 .CO domain names. As of January 2014, that number has grown to over 1.6 million .CO domains registered. As of December 2018, there were 2.2 million.

With respect to search engine optimization, Google confirmed that "it will rank .co domains appropriately if the content is globally targeted".

=== Summary of policies since 2010 ===
- Any person or entity in the world can register .co domain names
- There are no domicile or burdensome documentation requirements
- Registration period is between 1 and 5 years, subject to renewal
- Registrants can easily transfer domain names

.CO domains became available via the following timeline:

- April 1, 2010 – April 20, 2010: Sunrise A allowed registered local trademarks to apply for exact match domains.
- April 26, 2010 – June 10, 2010: Sunrise B allowed trademarks of national effect to apply for exact match domains.
- June 21, 2010 – July 13, 2010: Landrush allowed anyone to apply for domain names of high commercial value.
- July 20, 2010: .co domains became generally available.

== Third-level domain registrations ==
The third-level domain registrations closely mirror the "traditional" IANA .com/.net/.org/.gov/.edu/.mil-hierarchy, with the addition of a national equivalent of .name. Different from registrations directly under .co, which are used to signal globally-relevant interests, third-level domains are used to signal locally-relevant business, organizations, academic institutions, and government.

The registration of .gov.co, .edu.co, .mil.co, and .org.co domains is restricted.

Domain	Intended purpose
.com.co	Commercial
.org.co	Organizations
.edu.co	Educational
.gov.co	Government
.net.co	Network infrastructure
.mil.co	Military
.nom.co	Individuals

== History ==
IANA delegates ISO 3166-1 alpha-2 codes as country code top-level domains, and on December 24, 1991, the .co top-level domain was assigned to Colombia and delegated to the Universidad de los Andes.

In 2001, the university began to consider the possibility of marketing the domain as an alternative to the generic top-level domains. The government of Colombia objected on the basis that the university, a private entity, did not have regulatory oversight of the TLD and the Minister of Communications, Angela Montoya Holguín, wrote to them requesting that they not continue. In turn the university wrote to ICANN, rejecting the government's objections and stating their intention to appoint a subcontractor to handle the commercialization of the domain.

At a meeting on December 11, 2001, Holguín asked the Consultative Chamber and Civil Service of the Council of State to consider three issues:

1. whether the .co domain is a public resource
2. if the domain is public resource, whether it is intrinsically-linked with telecommunications
3. if the domain is linked with telecommunications, who should profit from its commercialization

In relation to these three issues, the meeting concluded that:

1. the .co domain, having been assigned to Colombia, is of public interest
2. the administration of the domain is intrinsically-related to telecommunications, and hence falls under the purview of the Ministry of Communications, with the exception of those functions assigned to the ICFES by the Ministry of National Education
3. unless the Congress of Colombia adopts an act allowing tax to be collected in relation to the registration of domain names, no amount can be charged for such a service

In response to the Council of State meeting, the university wrote to ICANN on 12 February 2002 stating that it had abandoned plans to commercialize the domain, and that as it could "no longer bear the administrative and operational responsibilities" it wished to discontinue its responsibility for operating the domain.

Finally, with the enactment of Law 1065 of 2006, the Ministry of Communications of Colombia initiated a public consultation process involving local and international participants, including members of the ICANN community, with the objective of defining the future of the .CO TLD. As a result of that process, through Resolution 001652 of 2008, the Ministry approved new policies that would govern the administration of the .CO TLD. A public procurement process began which resulted in the award of the administration contract to .CO Internet SAS. Finally, on February 7, 2010, the administration of the TLD was transitioned from the University of Andes to .CO Internet SAS, under the regulatory and policy supervision of the Ministry of Communications of Colombia.

On July 20, 2010, second level .co domains became available to the rest of the world on a first-come, first-served basis. In 2014, .CO Internet S.A.S was acquired by Neustar for US$109 Million, and became a wholly owned subsidiary of Neustar. It is responsible for the promotion, administration, and technical operation of the .co TLD.

In 2020, GoDaddy (NYSE: GDDY) acquired Neustar Registry and became the operator of .CO domain names.

== Accredited registrars ==
Only accredited registrars are able to sell .co domain names directly; other registrars selling .co domain names are acting as resellers. The list of accredited registrars is available on the .CO Internet website, and as of October 2011 there are 20 accredited registrars. Some of the 20 registrars operate under multiple brands.

== See also ==
- Internet in Colombia
