= Animal rights in Colombia =

Treatment of and laws concerning non-human animals in Colombia

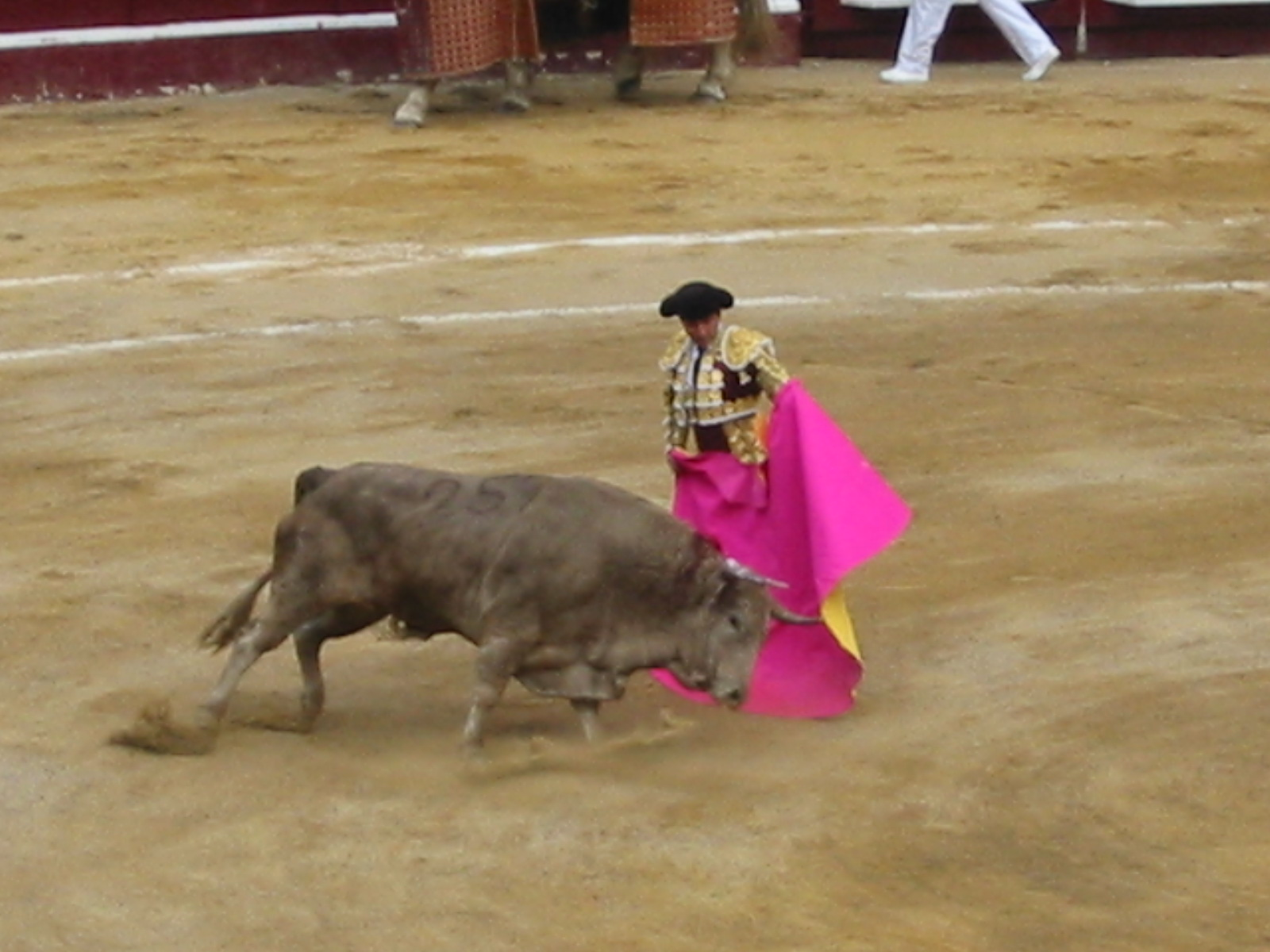
A bull fight in Bogotá, a legacy of Spanish culture. Despite being criticized by numerous organizations in Colombia, the practice of bullfighting was not outlawed until 2024.

Animal rights in Colombia refers to topics related to animal rights in Colombia. The Colombian constitution does not recognize animal rights. Law 84 of 1989 stipulates a statute to protect animals, with the exception of bullfighting and cock fights, which are considered to be part of the Culture of Colombia.

Despite having legislation against animal trafficking, Colombia is one of the major sources and routes for animal trafficking in the world. There are numerous non-governmental organizations working in Colombia on behalf of animal rights.

== Legislation ==
The Colombian Constitution does not officially establish an ethical duty of society to protect the environment, instead it does mention that people have the right to live in a healthy environment in chapter 3, about Collective and Environmental rights.

Law 99 of 1993 established the Ministry of Environment, Housing and Territorial Development but simply to guarantee service for humans. Animals were placed as belongings that served humans.

In 2014 and again in 2020, Colombia received a D out of possible grades A, B, C, D, E, F, G on World Animal Protection's Animal Protection Index.

In May 2024, The Colombian Senate approved a resolution banning Spanish-style bullfighting in Colombia.

=== Penalties ===
Legal penalties of the interest of animal rights are stipulated in Law 599 of 2000 which says that the illicit advantage taken of the renewable natural resources will be penalised. Trafficking, commercializing, taking advantage or benefiting of specimens, products or parts of the fauna or flora resources in danger will be penalized with between 2 and 5 years of prison and ten Colombian minimum monthly salaries.

=== Law reforms attempt ===
In September 2003 a project or draft to reform Law 84 of 1989 did not pass in the Congress of Colombia. The reform proposed the imposition of legal penalties to those who did not abide by the law.

== See also ==
- Fauna of Colombia
- Environmental issues in Colombia
