= Internet in Colombia =

Access to the Internet in Colombia shows a marked increase during the last few years. As of September 2009, the web connections surpassed two million, as compared with an estimated total of 900,000 Internet subscribers by the end of 2005. The current figure equated to 17 million Internet users, plus 3.8 million mobile internet users, or 38.5 percent of the 2009 population, as compared with 4,739,000 Internet users in 2005, or 11.5 percent of the 2005 population (10.9 per 100 inhabitants).

Colombia had 581,877 Internet hosts in 2006. This represents an overall growth of 54 percent each year, the highest in Latin America. Although as many as 70 percent of Colombians accessed the Internet over their ordinary telephone lines, dial-up access is losing ground to broadband. In 2005 Colombia had 345,000 broadband subscriber lines, or one per 100 inhabitants. In 2006 the number of personal computers per 1,000 people increased to an estimated 87 per 1,000 inhabitants, a rate still below that in other large Latin American economies.

As of 2009, Colombia duplicated the number of personal computers reaching 26.3 percent, as compared with the rest of Latin America which showed a decreasing trend (being Argentina and Mexico the only other country with positive growth, showing a 2.3 increase).

The internet country code is .co.

== History ==
The first approximation to internet made by Colombia was in 1988 with the creation of RDUA, a local network, by University of the Andes, Colombia, then in 1994 the same university is entrusted by a group of other Colombian universities and some government agencies to become the first Internet service provider in the country, on June 4, 1994, the first signal coming from Homestead, FL was received, this signal was sent through "IMPSAT" satellite service to a hill in Bogotá (Cerro de Suba), then redirected to Bogotá's tallest building (Torre Colpatria) and finally to the university campus .

== Censorship ==
There are no government restrictions on access to the Internet or credible reports that the government monitors e-mail or Internet chat rooms. Individuals and groups engage in the expression of views via the Internet, including by e-mail. However, journalists in Colombia have long been targets of a range of attempts to obstruct or limit speech, from government threats to withhold publication licenses to outright intimidation and physical violence. Journalists in Colombia are threatened, physically attacked, or murdered. For journalists working in Latin America, death threats are commonplace. Because of threats from local drug cartels or other gangs and individuals, many journalists practice self-censorship, including many in Colombia who avoid reporting on corruption, drug trafficking, or violence by armed groups because of such threats.

Colombia was classified as engaged in selective Internet filtering in the social area with little or no evidence of filtering in the political, conflict/security, or Internet tools areas by the OpenNet Initiative in 2011.

Colombian law requires ISPs to monitor their content and report any illegal activity to the government. Colombia's “Internet Sano” (healthy Internet) campaign calls for public education on “decent” ways of using the Internet as well as penalties for improper use. Some websites are blocked as part of the Internet Sano program, including various large adult entertainment websites which don't contain any illegal child pornography. Child pornography is illegal in Colombia.

ONI testing on two Colombian ISPs revealed evidence of one blocked website; the government has also taken measures aimed at reducing children's exposure to online pornography. The government has passed laws addressing online privacy, electronic surveillance, and cybercrime, although Colombia's national intelligence service has reportedly engaged in extrajudicial surveillance. A pending law governing digital copyright, which was proposed as a measure of compliance with Colombia's free trade agreement with the United States, is currently being contested at the Supreme Court by advocates who assert that the law violates the country's constitution by limiting citizens’ rights to access information.

In December 2009, an internet user was sent to prison for threatening president Álvaro Uribe's sons.

== See also ==
- List of countries by number of Internet users
- List of countries by number of broadband Internet users
