= Smoking in Colombia =

Smoking in Colombia was banned in May 2008 in public transport vehicles, hospitals, kindergartens and schools, bars, clubs, restaurants, business centers and airports. Smoking areas in enclosed public places were also banned.

== Prevalence ==
There are over 5 million smokers in Colombia. Teenage smokers account for nearly a third of smokers, and their numbers continue to rise. The ministry of social security and health reported that diseases related to smoking killed an average of 68 Colombians per day before the implementation of the ban.
