= History of the Colombian National Police =

This is the history of the Colombian National Police. For further reading, see history of Colombia.

== Creation 19th century ==
During the second half of the 19th century Colombia went through many political changes and struggles to define itself as a nation. Tensions between the two main political parties; Liberals and Conservatives escalated to numerous civil wars trying to establish a political system between federalism or centralism and other major differences.

The Colombian National Police was established by Law 90 of 1888 to be under government orders and as a dependency of the then Ministry of Government with the intention to function as a Gendarmerie force for Bogotá.

The new institution was planned to be a force of 300 Gendarmeries divided into three companies; commanded by a captain, two lieutenants and a second lieutenant, all commanded by two high-ranking officers.

On October 23, 1890, acting president Carlos Holguín sanctioned into Law the authorization to hire any qualified trainers from the either the United States or Europe to organize and train the newly established National Police. The Colombian officials selected a French Commissioner named Jean Marie Marcelin Gilibert. The institution was formally established by the 1000 of November 5, 1891.

The National Police initial mission was to preserve public tranquility, protecting people and public and private properties. By constitutional law the institution had to enforce and guarantee the rights of the people, the constitution and its laws and obey their authority. Its function also included the authority to take action to prevent crimes, persecute and arrest infractors. The National Police was intended to not recognize privileges or distinctions among the general population, with the only exception of international treaties established in the Constitution that gave immunity to members of diplomatic missions.

After a civil war broke out in 1895 during the presidency of Rafael Núñez, the president went absent and Miguel Antonio Caro took over office temporarily and declared a general state of emergency in which the National Police was transferred to the Ministry of War on January 21, 1896, and its members received same privileges as the military personnel.

When aged president Manuel Antonio Sanclemente was replaced by Vice-president José Manuel Marroquín who assumed the presidency, the National Police was restructured and organized in a military manner. It was transferred back to the Ministry of Government and to guarantee the security of Bogotá was divided into seven districts to cover the entire city. A mutual fund called Caja de Gratificaciones was set up to pay benefits to service members and financed by the penalties imposed to the civilian population. By 1899 the National Police had a 944 agents strong force divided into eight divisions.

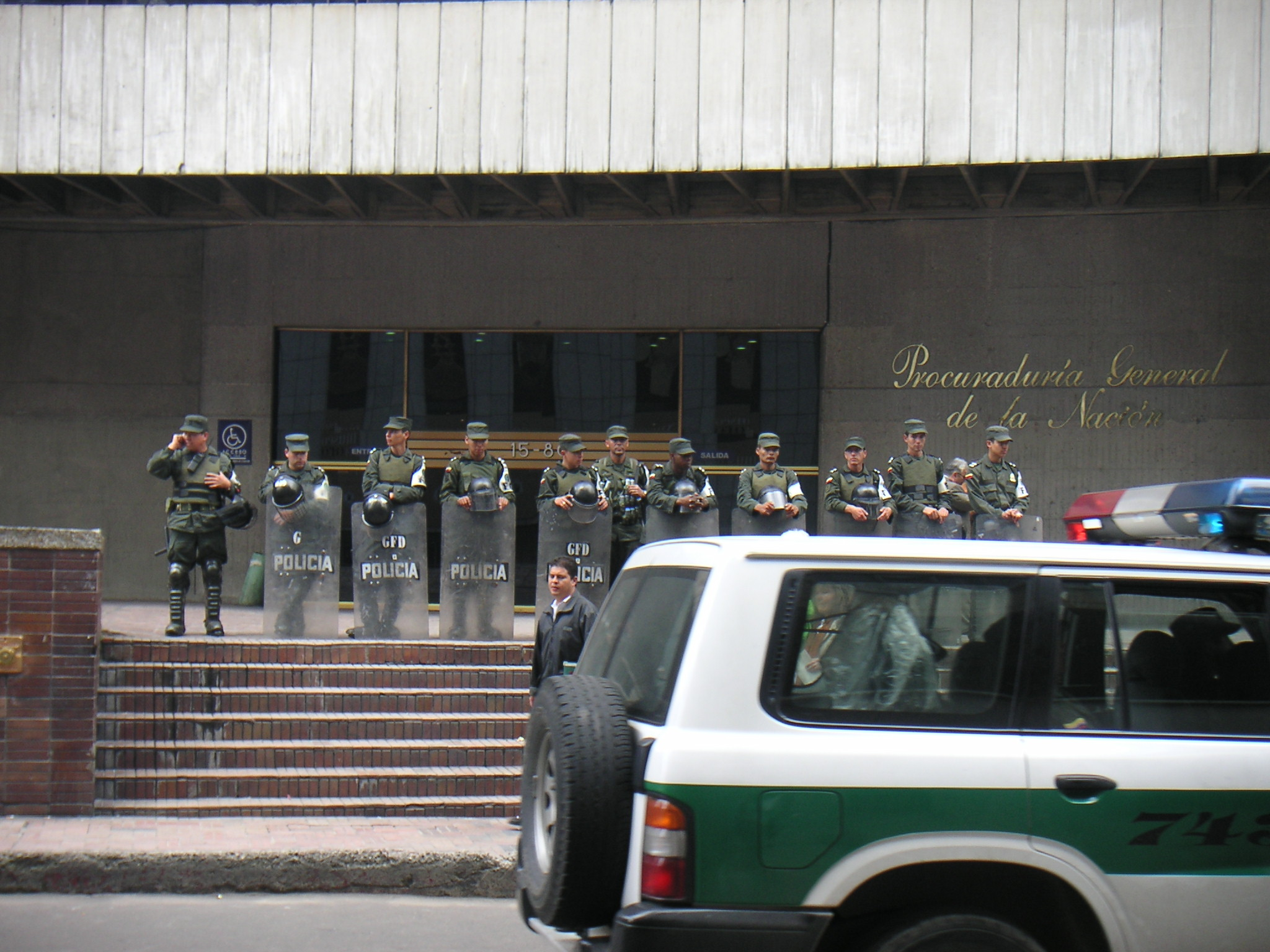
Colombian National Policemen guarding the "Colombian Procurement General" Building.

== Twentieth century ==
When the most intense of the civil wars broke out, known as the Thousand Days War (1899–1902), the National Police was once again assigned to the Ministry of War until September 6, 1901. Under the Decree 1380 of September 16, 1902, the National Police created the Presidential Palace Honor Guard Corps with the name Guardia Civil de la Ciudad de Bogotá (Civil Guard of the City of Bogotá).

During the presidency of Rafael Reyes, the government authorized by decree 743 of 1904 the Police was once again transferred to the Ministry of War, with the president micro-managing the institution. By authorization of Law 43 the Judicial Commissary of Police was established under the dependency of the General Command of the National Police to investigate crimes within its jurisdiction.

From 1906 to 1909 the government created a cloned institution with similar functions to the National Police named National Gendarmerie Corps (Cuerpo de Gendarmeria Nacional) intended to function descentralized from the National Police command and more militarized regime, managed by the Ministry of War. When General Jorge Holguín suppressed the National Gendarmerie Corps, the province governors were given the authority to organize police service at their own will.

Law 14 signed on November 4, 1915, defined the National Police functions to "preserve public tranquility in Bogotá and any other place were needed to execute its functions, protect citizens and aid the constitutional law by enforcing it and the judicial branch of government. The institution was divided into three groups; the first in charge of security and vigilante functions, a second group acting as civil gendarmerie guard with the main function of protecting the postal service and controlling the prison system, the third group functioning as the judicial police. In 1916 the institution was trained by the Spanish Guardia Civil in their doctrine, mainly related to criminology. Two years later the organization was restructured by the Decree 1628 of October 9, 1918, assigning the direction, sub-direction and Inspector General duties to the Colombian Army. Soon thereafter, as authorized by Law 74 of November 19, 1919, Colombia's president hired a French instructor and chief of detectives, expert in the anthropometric system to train the National Police.

In 1924 the Criminal Investigation School was founded to update personnel working in this area. In 1929 the Colombian government in agreement with the Argentine government, hired Enrique Medina Artola to train the Colombian Police in dactylography to replace the anthropometric system. In 1934 in agreement with the Spanish government the National Police was trained in scientific identification until 1948.

On July 7, 1937, by the Decree 1277, the government authorized the creation of the General Santader Academy, which began operating in 1940 as an institute for every policemen recruit in the force. In 1939 the Colombian government receives the first cooperation agreement with the United States, through a Federal Bureau of Investigation (FBI) committee headed by agent Edgar K. Thompson.

== El Bogotazo and La Violencia ==
In 1948 when the civil unrest known as "El Bogotazo" broke out after the assassination of the popular presidential candidate Jorge Eliecer Gaitán the stability of the country was abruptly interrupted generating a period of civil unrest known as La Violencia which lasted for almost a decade. The government then decides to restructure once again the institution with the cooperation and advice from the British. The English mission was integrated by Colonel Douglas Gordon, Colonel Eric M. Roger, Lieutenant Colonel Bertrand W.H. Dyer, Major Frederick H. Abbot and Major William Parham, primarily assisted by Colombian lawyers Rafael Escallón, Timoleón Moncada, Carlos Losano Losano, Jorge and Enrique Gutiérrez Anzola.

By Decree 0446 of February 14, 1950, the National Police creates the Gonzálo Jiménez de Quesada Non-Commissioned School to train mid-level enlisted under the management of the General Santander National Police Academy.

== Military Dictator, Gustavo Rojas Pinilla ==
On June 13, 1953, Lieutenant General Gustavo Rojas Pinilla seizes power in a coup d'etat assuming functions as President of Colombia. In an attempt to better organize the military forces, President Rojas declares the Decree 1814 of this same day to group the General Command of the Military Forces under the name of General Command of the Armed Forces. Defined the conformation of the Armed Forces by the General Command of the Armed Forces, the Army, Navy, Air Force and Police Force, this last one assigned to the Ministry of War once again as a fourth military power, functioning with its own independent budget and organization from the other branches as established by law. The Ministry of War its later renamed with the name of Ministry of Defense. Many Police Academies were planned and constructed in other cities of Colombia; in 1953 Academies Antonio Nariño in Barranquilla and Alejandro Gutiérrez in Manizales are opened, followed by a social plan for retirement and social security called Caja de Sueldos de la Policia Nacional by Decree 417 of 1954. The Eduardo Cuevas Academy later opened in 1955 in the city of Villavicencio and in 1958 the Carlos Holguín Academy in Medellín opens. During this year a cooperation mission arrives from Chile to reorganize and train the Carabinier Corps in urban and rural surveillance.

As established in Law 193 of December 30, 1959, the Colombian nation assumes full financial responsibility of the National Police.

== Colombian Armed Conflict ==
In 1964 and as mandated by the Decree 349 of February 19 of this same year the Police Superior Academy is founded to endoctrine officers with the rank of Major to the grade of Lieutenant Colonels. By 1977 the institution created the first course for female officers.

During the 1960s and 1970s the National Police started facing guerrilla threats which were emerging during these years as a backlash from the political bipartisan struggle of La Violencia years and also the growing problem of contraband and illegal drugs trafficking that also surfaced and the involvement of the United States with the implementation of the Plan LASO as a proxy war plan against the expansion of Communism during the Cold War, the later declaration of the war on drugs and the Plan Colombia, would eventually help develop the present and ongoing Colombian Armed Conflict involving mainly guerrillas; the FARC-EP including its Patriotic Union Party, ELN, Popular Liberation Army\EPL, M-19, among many others; The Drug Cartels such as the Medellín Cartel, Cali Cartel, and others; Paramilitarism and the AUC. The Colombian National Police has been fighting against these many threats tainted or involved in some cases of corruption and accusations of human rights violations amid the efforts of the majority of the institution to change its image.

== Late 1990s improvement drive ==
After some of its members were accused of being involved in many corruption cases, including guerrilla collaboration, paramilitarism and the cleansing of the leftist Patriotic Union Party, among other cases, the corruption generated by the drug cartels illegal money or other criminal activities, also fueled by the successive weak presidencies, the Colombian National Police became untrusted by the general population of Colombia, the country was facing an intense conflict or a full scale civil war.

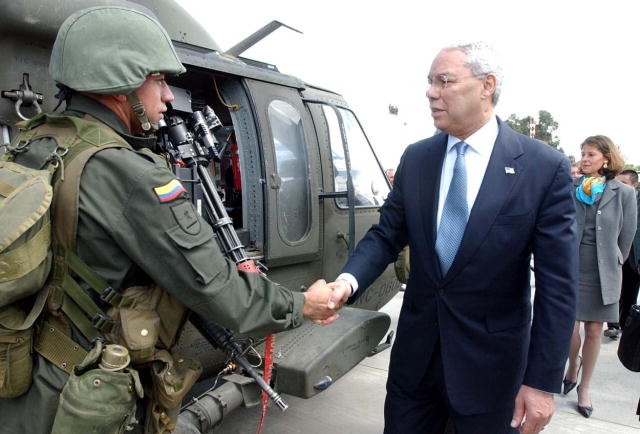
Former U.S. Secretary of State Colin Powell during a visit to Colombia greeted by a Colombian National Police patroller.

To prevent this situation the institution began a process of change focusing on reinvigorating the values and principles of the institution mostly led by General Rosso Jose Serrano. Colombia's problems were demanding a strong government with strong institutions to face the numerous violations to the constitution and the population in general. The first steps towards this path was the deputarion process of bad policemen inside the force and targeting the major criminal organizations. The institution also focused on providing better benefits for the Policemen and their families and a particular effort to reinstate the trust of the community on the Police force emphasizing on preventing crime, educating the population and the policemen on cordial relationship, neighbor watch, cooperation with solidarity and community development.

Since 1995 the National Police began to change norms, structures and standard operating procedures, essentially on policemen judgment towards accomplishing missions and emphasizing on those who are willing to work with self-less service, integrity, leadership and vision of improving the population in general.

The National Police continues to have some corruption and human rights problems but the improvement has been considerably positive including the formation and education of personnel in other countries law enforcement institutions and educational institutions through cooperation agreements. The institution is also highly involved in the Plan Colombia.
