= Environmental issues in Colombia =

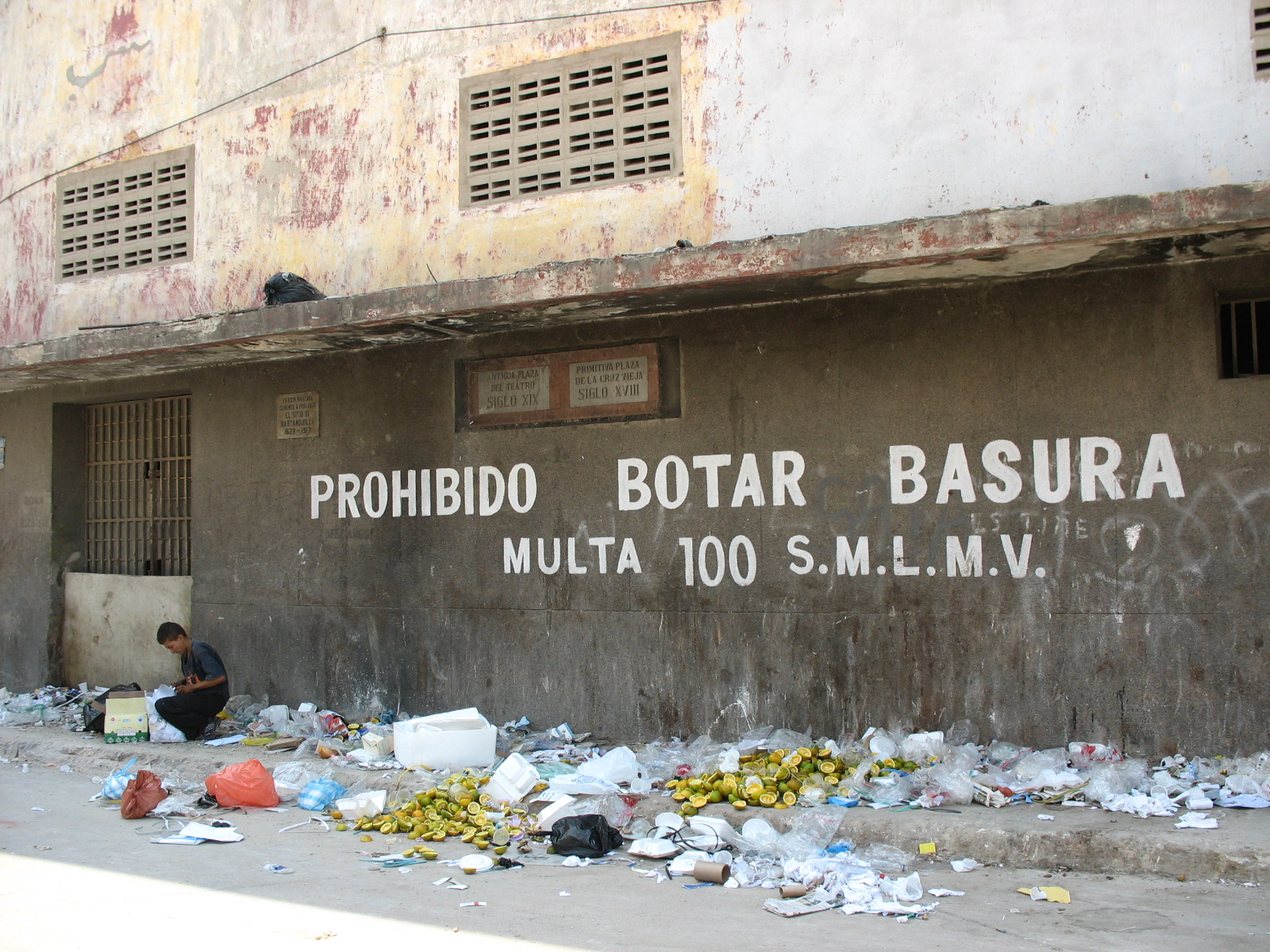
Litter pollution on the streets of Barranquilla.

Environmentally, Colombia is a mega-diverse country from its natural land terrain to its biological wildlife. Its biodiversity is a result of its geographical location and elevation. It is the fourth largest South American country and only country in South America to have coasts on the Pacific and Caribbean Sea. Colombia's terrain can be divided into six main natural zones: The Caribbean, the Pacific (including Choco's Biogeographic rainforest), The Orinoco region, The Amazonia region, the Andean region, and the Insular region. 52.2% of the environment is predominately the Andes, Amazon, and Pacific Basins, followed by the Orinoco basin 13.9%, the Andes and the Caribbean. The Tropical Andes, Choco, and the Caribbean are considered biodiversity hotspots which puts these areas at high risk of concentration of colonizing activities. Colombia host over 1800 bird species and at least one new species are detected every year. Decades of civil war and political unrest have impeded biological and environmental research in Colombia. The political unrest in Colombia catalyzes the alteration of land patterns through the cultivation of coca and opium crops, the redirection of extractive activities, and land abandonment in some areas.

There are many environmental issues in Colombia. Issues include deforestation, soil erosion, illicit drug crops grown in national natural reserves by mafias (not peasants), pollution on major bodies of water by corporations (backed up by unregulated / unsupervised policies and by the corruption of local and federal authorities) among others.

There is soil and water quality damage from contamination by the use of chemicals in the coca-refining process, spillage of crude oil into the local rivers as a result of guerrilla sabotage of pipelines, overuse of pesticides, and air pollution (especially in Bogotá) from vehicle emissions. Natural hazards include highlands subject to volcanic eruptions, occasional earthquakes, and periodic droughts.

== Deforestation ==
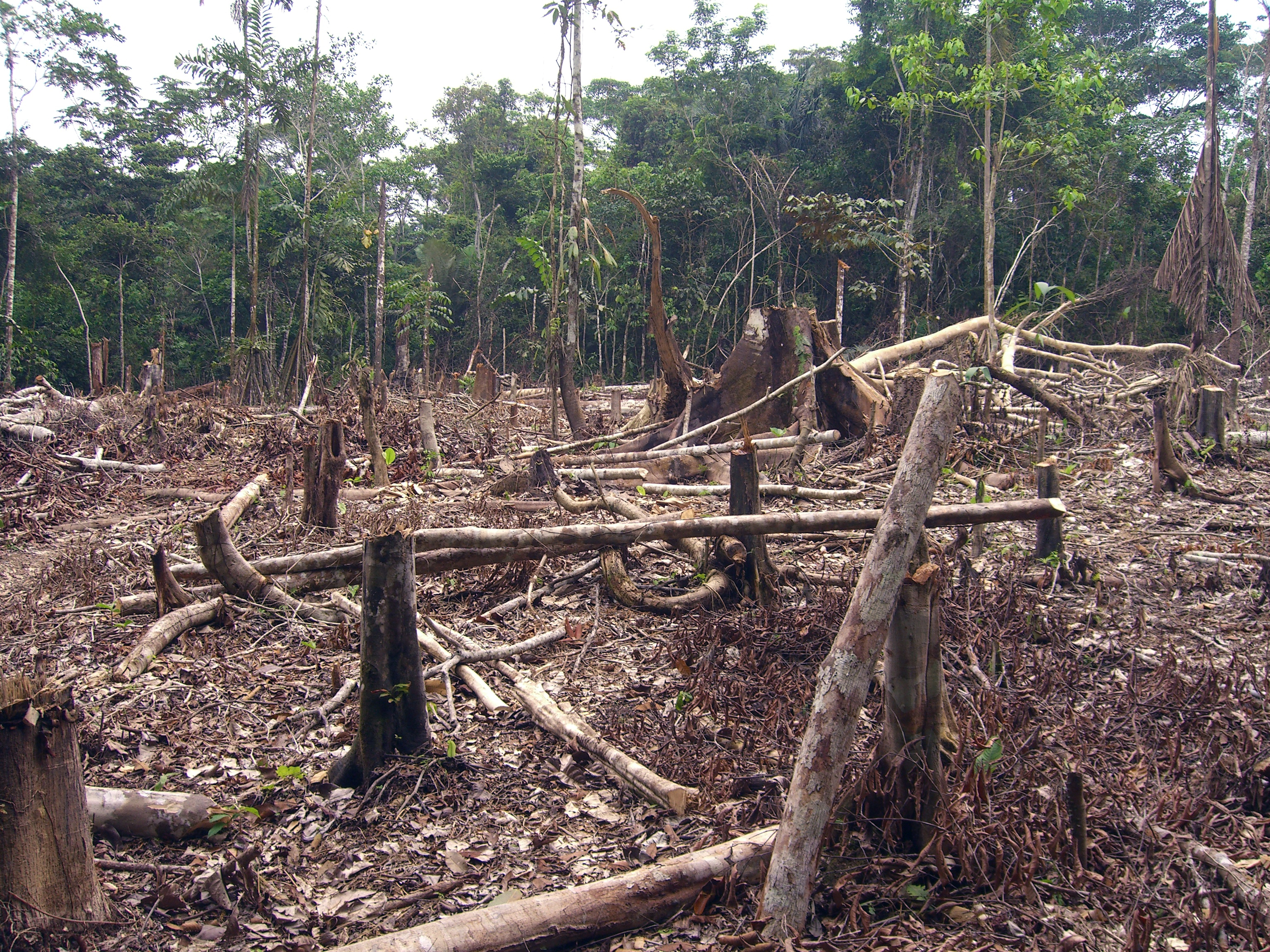
The results of slash-and-burn agriculture in the Colombian Amazon

Colombia loses 2,000 km^{2} of forest annually to deforestation, according to the United Nations in 2003. Some suggest that this figure is as high as 3,000 km^{2} due to illegal logging in the region. Deforestation results mainly from logging for timber, small-scale agricultural ranching, mining, development of energy resources such as hydro-electricity, infrastructure, cocaine production, and farming. Around one-third of the country's original forest has been removed as a result of deforestation.

Deforestation in Colombia is mainly targeted at primary rainforest which covers more than 80% of Colombia. This has a profound ecological impact in that Colombia is extremely rich in biodiversity, with 10% of the world's species, making it the second most biologically diverse country on Earth.

A national and regional deforestation study in Colombia found a total loss of 5,116,071 ha of forest between 1990 and 2005 which indicates an annual deforestation rate of 341,071 ha. This concludes the national rate of deforestation equals to 0.62%. Higher deforestation rates are found in flatter areas around rural locations where protected areas are more present. Even though majority of ecosystems in the Amazon, the Choco, and the Orinoco remain intact, 71% of original forest in the Andes has been wiped out. Forest conversion has the highest probability in the Andean and Caribbean territory, although tropical forest in the Pacific and Amazon lowlands continue to be exterminated. The ecosystems most vulnerable to deforestation ranked: the plains in northern Amazonia, the humid high, sub, and mid-altitude Andean forests, the tropical high and low land forests in the Caribbean and the Magdalena tropical forest plains. Deforestation is happening more frequently in flatter zones, where cattle density and rural population are low. Illicit crop cultivation has been recorded a main driver of deforestation in Colombia. The globalized economy has extended new engenders of deforestation, such as biofuel production, mining, and hydrocarbon extraction. At the national level, rate of rural population, protected areas, cattle practicing, and slope, are deforestation drivers. Forest eradication is a crucial environmental issue given the biodiversity and ecosystems these forests provide and all the life that can be potentially lost. The concurrent forested areas predominately exist on less fertile soil and are distant from roads.

=== Amazonian deforestation ===
In Colombia, majority of forests are contained within the Amazonia. The population of this region is sparsely populated engendering the zone to be concentrated by deforestation and high levels of extractive activities. In the Colombian Amazonia from 1990 to 2005 there was a forest loss of 1,886,769 ha (3.9%) with an annual rate of 0.49%. Deforestation in this region is accounted to population and land use. The Amazonia possess a low populated area with small scale agriculture (including illegal crops), and cattle ranching. Fires in the Amazon also remain as a catalyst of deforestation which is an indicator of slash and burn activities associated with exploitation of natural resources. Study results suggest deforestation in the Amazonia often takes place in unoccupied rural territory where an influx of "colonist population move freely and colonization hotspots using the river" are created.

=== Deforestation in the Orinoco ===
Majority of the Orinoco is composed by grasslands and pastures areas with small-scale agriculture, forest with extensive river networks and a small population. A major threat to this region is deforestation, and deforestation is a critical menace to biodiversity. From 1990 to 2005, 507,337 ha that is 3.2% of the Orinoco forest disappeared at an annual rate of 0.83%. Causes of deforestation in this region range from land use for agriculture, illicit crops, and mining to slope elevation. Like the Amazonia, the Orinoco is scarcely populated and has a small-scale agriculture (including illicit cropping), and cattle grazing. Deforestation is highly affected by both legal and illegal cropping, and by mining that negative impacts mountain forest at higher lands of the basin. Over the last 10 years the Orinoco along with the Amazonia has been subjected to greater pressures from bio-fuel companies.

=== Caribbean deforestation ===
The Caribbean forest significantly has been transformed into an area of fragments of dry forest with pastures scarce of vegetation. During the fifteen-year period (1990–2005) 753,893 ha of forest were lost that is 5% of the Caribbean forest at an annual rate of 1.92%. In Colombia, cattle grazing productivity is the highest in this region, this practice plus its use of slash and burn activities influence deforestation. Land tenure and illicit cropping also prompt deforestation in this area. When land becomes scarce highland areas provide opportunity for agriculture expansion and forest removal. Three deforestation hotspots were found in the Caribbean: the Sierra Nevada de Santa Marta, San Lucas, and Perija, where slopes are wetter and steeper and flat land is occupied by cattle grazing or agricultural operations indicating that wetter and steeper municipalities had higher forest loss.

=== Pacific deforestation ===
The Pacific is regarded as one of the wettest zones in the world holding an annual precipitation of 4,000 mm up to more than 10,000 mm in some areas, the climate ranges from humid to superhumid, the population is sparse, and this region is recognized as one of the world's most biologically and culturally diverse areas composed by various Afro-Colombians, and indigenous peoples. In a fifteen-year period, the Pacific experienced one of the highest deforestation rate loss of 472,863 ha about 6.32% of forest loss at an annual rate of 0.42%. Logging has occurred in the region for decades, but over the last ten years, pressures from bio-fuel companies have intensified.

=== Andean deforestation ===
The Andes is of particular interest because of its known importance as a biodiversity hot spot, as a provider of water to a grand human population, and its vulnerability to climate change and deforestation. The Andean forest stand as the second most fragmented natural habitat In Colombia. Recent causes of deforestation in this region has shifted to illicit crops and cattle grazing. From 2007–2010, 340,842 Ha of forest were lost, while 633 Ha of illicit crops and 225,279 Ha of pastures were added. The Deforestation rate of 0.67% found in the Colombian Andes is higher than the average deforestation rate reported for South American forests 0.38%. However, low lands in this region experience deforestation at higher rates than mountain lands because the population is mainly concentrated in mountain top areas. From 1990 to 2005 montane forests went from 7,335,125 ha to 6,405,591 ha (0.63%), and for lowland forest change from 3,671,768 ha to 3,123,369 ha (0.75%). Throughout the decades, deforestation in the Colombian Andean zone has only accelerated (Vina). By 1998, 69% of the Andean forest and 30% of the lowland Andean forests were cleared. In 2000 the remaining natural cover in Los Andes was 39%, that means that over 60% of its natural coverage has been lost and today this region continues to through natural resource extraction including exploitation, settlement and deforestation. Deforestation was mostly accounted to cropping 32% and cattle ranching activities for its remaining. In the montane forest deforestation was affected by land tenure of small parcels, road, water presence, and temperature. In the lowlands deforestation was associated with population, crops (licit and illicit), protected areas and temperature. The introduction of the oil industry in the 1990s and its promise of high wages has generated deforestation and migration of local farmers who abandoned their pasture maintenance to enter the extraction industry.

Colombia had a 2018 Forest Landscape Integrity Index mean score of 8.26/10, ranking it 26th globally out of 172 countries.

== Biodiversity loss ==
=== Birds loss in Los Andes ===
Colombia holds 18% of the world's bird species. The Andes alone is one of the most diverse areas in the world. However, bird species specifically in the San Lucas Andean mountain ranges are endangered. The absence of government protection from armed conflict in San Lucas has facilitated the cultivation of coca crops and deforestation, which has resulted in local biodiversity loss. In some areas in the Western Andes concentrations of endemic threatened birds reached 46 species in certain areas. Neotropical birds especially from higher elevations are more prone to extinction. A study done in a 3000 ha reserve in Los Andes that conserves an extensive amount of endemic and small ranged bird species found 227 species in the region nine that pronounced threatened by the International Union for the Conservation of Nature four of these are endemic species to Colombia: the Munchique Wood-wren, the Chestnut-bellied Flowerpiercer, the Yellow-eared Parrot, the Magdalena Tapaculo, the Bicoloured Antvireo, the Tanager Finch, the Ruddy Pigeon, the White-capped Tanager, and Red-bellied Grackle.

=== Wildlife trafficking ===
The black market of animal trafficking is considered the second biggest threat to biodiversity in Colombia and the third most lucrative illegal enterprise. Colombia has a seventy-year history of animal smuggling, in some cases impoverished families from the country side amplify their income by selling mafia groups lizards, monkey, and parrots. International smuggling entities tend to be involved in the business of smuggling other trades because they are specialized in smuggling routes. Experts approximate that in 2003 6,000,000 animals were illegally exported from Colombia, 200,000 of these are primates destined for laboratories and research centers. Colombian drug lords are known to have private zoos with endangered species engendering a demand of exotic creatures. Colombia has an animal trafficking policy of six months to three years of jail but no one has served such sentence. During the first months of 2012, enforcement officers rescued more than 46,000 animals including birds and reptiles heading for the illegal international trade.

=== Sloths ===
The biggest threat to sloth's survival in Colombia is the destruction and fragmentation of their habitat. Three types of sloths' species are distinguished in Colombia: the brown-throated three-toed sloth, Bradypus variegatus which inhabits the Pacific and Amazonian lowland rainforest and the Caribbean, the Hoffman's two-toed sloth, Choloepus hoffmanni prevails in the north along with the B. variegatus, in the Pacific rainforest and the Caribbean savanna dry forest, but it is also found in Andean montane forest, and the southern two-toed sloth, Choloepus didactylus who is native in the south with B. variegatus, sharing the lowland Amazonian rainforest, but this specific species has been studied little in Colombia. Habitat for these species is limited primarily by the ongoing deforestation with in natural forest. The continuous expansion of agriculture, ranching, and urbanization are a direct threat to sloths' survival. Frequently, sloths die in large numbers in accidents related to the destruction of natural forests that go underreported by the media and lack attention from wildlife agencies and police. All three-different species have a different rate and specific threat to their survival but collectively habitat loss – deforestation is pivotal. Deforestation facilitates the illegal trade of sloths as they are usually caught by young children who take them from deforested areas and sell them to traffickers. Poachers also take hundreds of young two-and three-toed sloths from their mothers. The Colombian Ministry does not recognize the three-sloth species as being in threat of extinction mainly because there is no long-term study that represents the estimate of the total sloth population to demonstrate cause of concern.

== Air pollution ==
In 2019, 37% of greenhouse gases generated in Colombia came from transportation, and only 1.2% of the quarter-million new vehicles registered that year were electric or hybrids.

=== Bogotá ===
Colombia's capital city, Bogotá, is the country's largest population center. With over 7 million people, it is also one of the biggest cities in Latin America. Bogotá also has the highest rate of air pollution in Colombia and it has surged most recently as a result of the expansion of cars in the city. Air pollution has been monitored in Bogotá since 1967, but it was not until 1990 that monitors were widely spread through the city. A study conducted by the Secretary of Health of the District in collaboration with the Japanese International Cooperation Agency (JICA) concluded that 70% of air pollution is attributed to vehicles, it was also identified that bricks, battery plants and others were crucial pollution sources as well. This study concluded a nexus between air pollution and respiratory health by relating air pollutants with the number of daily respiratory admissions. Statistics from the Secretary of Health demonstrated that between 1998 and 1999 about 9.6% of visits to hospitals were related to respiratory issues this percentage was higher for infant visits to the doctor associated to Acute Respiratory Illnesses 24.3%. Monitoring stations reveal that half of the areas with monitoring stations are surpass emission limits considered safe by the WHO, Particulate Matter (PM10) and ozone levels are the leading problem.

=== Medellín ===
Medellín is the second city in Colombia with the worst air quality, and within the city, Downtown Medellin is one of the most contaminated areas by car emissions. Low quality gasoline and diesel are considered a main source of air pollutants. Medellin's shift toward urbanization, has increased the number of vehicles and thus extended the use of fossil fuels. Areas known for heavy traffic are monitored by meters that measure the amount of air pollution. Some of the sectors that have been recognized with the highest levels of pollution within the metropolitan area are: Itagüí-Ditaires, Politécnico Jaime Isaza-Cadavid, and Downtown Medellín (particularly the Miguel de Aguinaga building and San Antonio Park). Downtown Medellin's pollution rates exceed the norm established by the WHO of being a risk to human health.

=== Cali ===
Cali is the capital of Valle del Cauca municipality, and one of the city's of greatest concern in terms of air pollution in Colombia together with Bogotá and Medellin. City authorities launched the "Clean Air for Cali Program" to reduce atmospheric contamination; the program deals with emissions and their health impacts, improving air quality monitoring, implementation of measures to reduce contamination, and the cost-benefit evaluation those measures. Air quality reports are publicly available.

== Water pollution ==
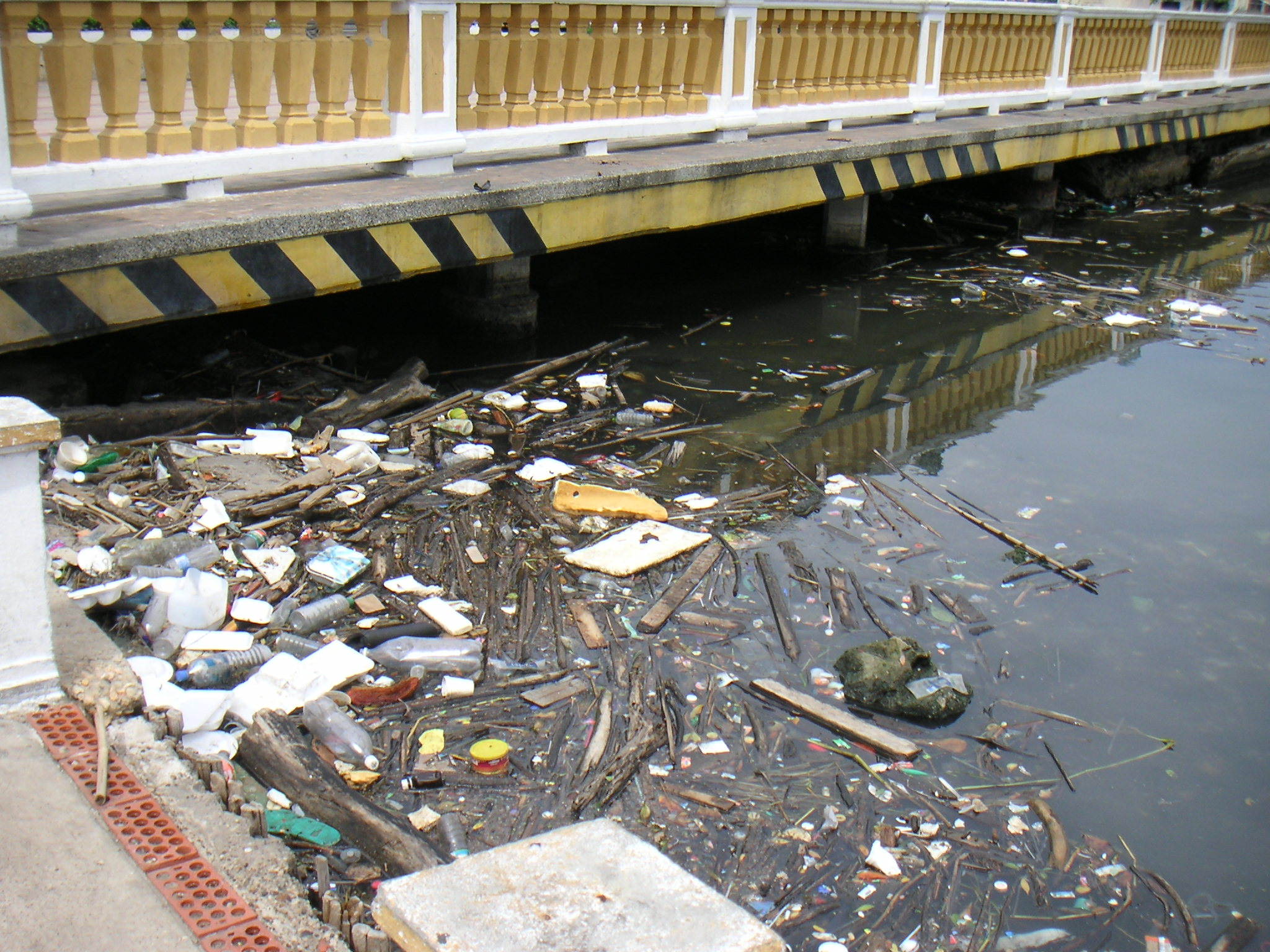
Trash in the bay of Cartagena, Colombia (2005).

Colombia is well endowed with rich water resources with a national average fresh water supply of more than 2,100 cubic kilometers. This is several times larger when compared to other Latin American countries like Argentina and Mexico. But Colombia is facing a serious problem of water pollution. This is limiting their use of abundant water resources for water supply, recreation and ecological benefits.

=== Toxic and pathogenic pollution ===
Rivers such as Bogotá, Cali, Combeima, Otún, Medellín, de Oro, Pamplonita, and Pasto which are one of the important water resources of Colombia are highly contaminated due to direct discharge of untreated effluents, pathogens and various other toxic substances primarily discharged by the agricultural sector, industrial sector and the mining sectors. These contaminants may result in cumulative and persistent consequences. Crude oil spills due to the acts of sabotage by leftist guerrilla squads, have become another cause of water pollution in the country.

=== Mining sector ===
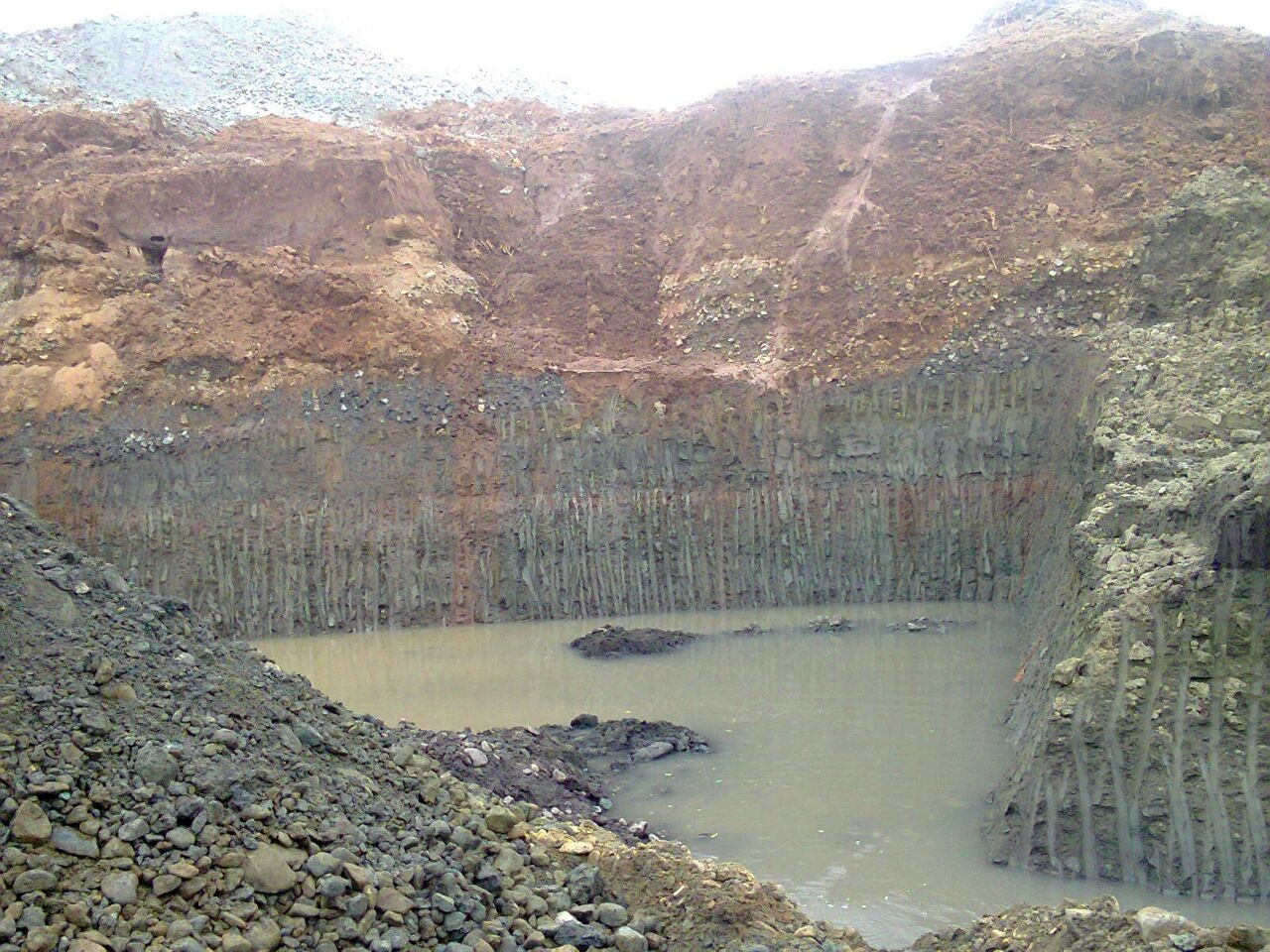
Contaminated water after the gold extraction process.

Colombia is one of the largest producers of gold in Latin America. It has recently increased its production, especially in the Departments of Antioquia, Chocó, Bolívar, and Córdoba, which in 2014 produced 90% of Colombia's gold. Most of this production comes from artisanal and Small-Scale Gold Mining (ASGM). The artisanal gold mining sector in Colombia has 200,000 miners officially producing 30 tons Au/a. The impact of gold mining on the environment mainly depends on the location of the metal and the methods used to extract it. Gold mining activities require high volumes of water to obtain the metal and this leads to an alteration in surface and underground water bodies. Rivers are affected as many local mines discharge untreated waters and tailings directly to waterways. When rivers like Magdalena and Cauca reach Antioquia, they receive polluted loads caused by mining activity from tributaries from the Northeast and Bajo Cauca regions. In addition to the local mines, informal mining operations add to the water pollution by directly discharging many pollutants like suspended sediment, organic matter, acid drainage, metals, grease, oils and fuels into the waterways.

The major health risk from artisanal mining is mercury exposure.

Among the emissions from artisanal mining, two thirds are released locally into soil and water near mining operations, and a third is released into the atmosphere, where it can potentially attack people far from mining sites too. Artisanal mining is the largest single source of atmospheric mercury. Pollution due to Mercury can occur in two ways- a) through Air and b) through Water. Mercury vapors in the air around amalgam burning sites can be alarmingly high and almost always exceed the WHO limit for public exposure of 1,000 nanogram/cubic meter. This risks the health of workers but also those in the communities surrounding the processing centers. Exposure to levels of mercury vapors above 1,200,000 nanogram/cubic meter can be fatal.

Water pollution due to mercury has become one of the biggest concerns in recent years. Artisanal and small-scale gold miners use mercury to extract gold in developing nations worldwide, contributing an estimated 30% of global mercury emissions annually. Colombia is the world's highest per capita mercury polluter. The total mercury release/emissions to the Colombian environment can be as high as 150 tons/a. In the case of Antioquia, the total amount of mercury used in the Northeast and Bajo Cauca regions is around 93.4 tons/annum.

=== Water pollution due to mercury contamination ===
Studies conducted in the Department of Cordoba showed that mercury levels in fish species in the basin of San Jorge river exceed the specified threshold (200 ng/g) for populations at risk established by World Health Organization. Few other studies show mercury contamination in plants, fish and sediments in some water bodies in the region of Mojana. In the region of Ayapel, significant concentrations of mercury in water, plants, fish and sediments swamp was found. Sources suggest that all the metal contaminations can be attributed to the mining activities on the main gold zone of Colombia and San Jorge River basin.

=== Human exposure and risk assessment ===
In placer mining, mercury is added to the material extracted from the alluvial deposits. Excess mercury is discharged into adjacent waterways along with other residues of the ore which enters into the local ecosystem. Mercury grows into a greater threat to health as it moves through the aquatic food chain. In the aquatic environment, the elemental "quicksilver" form of mercury is taken by the bacteria and algae and is converted into the far more dangerous methylmercury. As methylmercury travels up the food chain, from algae to plankton to small fish to big fish, it becomes progressively more concentrated. When humans consume fish that contains methyl mercury, it is absorbed into the human body through gastrointestinal system. Mercury can enter the brain and cross the placenta. Once methylmercury enters the human body, it is relatively difficult to eliminate methylmercury from the body as it is bound to proteins. The effects of methylmercury on developing fetus were tragically demonstrated in Minimata, Japan. Children born to mothers who consumed mercury-contaminated fish suffered devastating birth defects, particularly those affecting the nervous system.

When humans consume contaminated fish, they suffer neurological damage and autoimmune disorders. In addition, methylmercury can cause IQ loss, delayed speech and other neuro-developmental deficits among children when exposed. Early life exposures are the most harmful as they can damage the whole brain. Later life exposures may result in localized damage to the cerebellum, visual cortex, and motor strip. In adults, these exposures can lead to visuospatial problems and effects on executive functioning, memory and mood.

=== Prevention ===
Colombian government has been putting effort to reduce mercury usage levels. The adoption in July 2013 of Law 1658 to reduce and eliminate mercury use is an important step. It aims to phase out the use of mercury in all production processes within ten years and in mining within five years.

Awareness has to be brought in miners regarding the risks involved in using mercury. In addition to the awareness, miners should be introduced to new techniques that minimize mercury use or provided with safer alternatives that can replace mercury amalgamation.

According to Sam Spiegel, a lecturer in international development at the University of Edinburgh, "efforts to lower mercury emissions should aim to support miners and their livelihoods by supplying access to better technology". This does not mean completely eliminating mercury but rather using it more efficiently.

A practical guide published by ASGM in 2011 on how to reduce mercury uses, UNEP recommends limiting mercury use with improved practices and moving towards mercury-free technologies that either boost or maintain miner income while protecting the health and the environment.

The economic interests of the miners should also be safeguarded while protecting health and environment.

Currently, the Government of Antioquia, Corantioquia, Universidad Nacional de Colombia and BioRedd are developing programs to help informal miners to improve their mining circuit and are introducing technologies that avoid mercury use in their process. They presented a proposed plant design that eliminates the use of mercury by replacing gravity concentration processes taking advantage of the characteristics of the treated material.

Recently, many companies have started re-evaluating gravity systems as they are relatively simple and that they produce little environmental pollution and also due to the increased costs of flotation reagents. They proved to be effective as they significantly reduce mercury use. They are proving to miners that with technical support and using alternatives to mercury they are able to recover more valuable material than they do at present.

== Government response ==
New environmental protection legislation was enacted in 1991, including the creation of specially protected zones, of which more than 200 were created in the early 1990s, mostly in forest areas and national parks. As a result of this charter, the Ministry of the Environment was established in 1993, merging with the housing and drinking water division of the Ministry of Economic Development, Housing, and Potable Water in 2003.

As of April 5, 2018, Colombia's highest court has declared that the government of Colombia is responsible and must take urgent action to protect its Amazon Rainforest. This 4-3 ruling has also recognized the Amazon as an "entity subject of rights", which means the Amazon Rainforest has the same legal rights as a human being. The court ordered the local and national government, the environment and agriculture ministries and environmental authorities to come up with action plans within four months to combat deforestation in the Amazon. In 2019, however, the government spent 21% less on environmental protection than it had the previous year. This was one of the conclusions of a 333-page report, "Estado de los recursos naturales y del ambiente," released by the government's Contraloría General in 2020.

On November 24, 2016, FARC and the Colombian government signed a peace agreement. This was expected to give the government more control to regulate illegal logging and deforestation in the Amazon rainforest, allowing the government to avoid expenses caused by environmental degradation. The savings were estimated at about COP $7.1 billones annually (US $2.4 billion at the exchange rate at that time).

The government of Colombia has launched the Amazon Vision Project. The Project, with the financial backing of Norway, Germany, and the United Kingdom, aims to completely eradicate deforestation of Colombia's Amazon by 2020. In the Climate Summit of 2015, Colombia, Germany, Norway, and the United Kingdom signed a Joint Declaration to strengthen collaboration on the climate and forests in Colombia. Norway has committed to a total of 1.8 billion Norwegian crones to Colombia within 2020. The project has been adopted as a national policy and priority in the new National Development Plan 2014-2018. The inclusion of the Program in this PND meant that for the first time in the country there is a framework for development policy that promotes green growth strategies with concrete goals of education of consequences of deforestation and goals of conservation and sustainable use for the Amazon region, offering the opportunity to influence national policies by inserting specificities of the Amazon region that help the region reduce deforestation. The project aims to improve forest governance, plan a sustainable sector development, begin environmental governance with indigenous people and enable conditions for the environment to thrive.

== See also ==
- Animal rights in Colombia
- Illegal drug trade in Colombia
- List of invasive species in Colombia
- Plan Colombia § Aerial Eradication strategy and criticisms
