= Office of the Inspector General of Colombia =

Colombian public watchdog institution

Office of the Inspector / Solicitor General
- Procuraduría General de la Nación
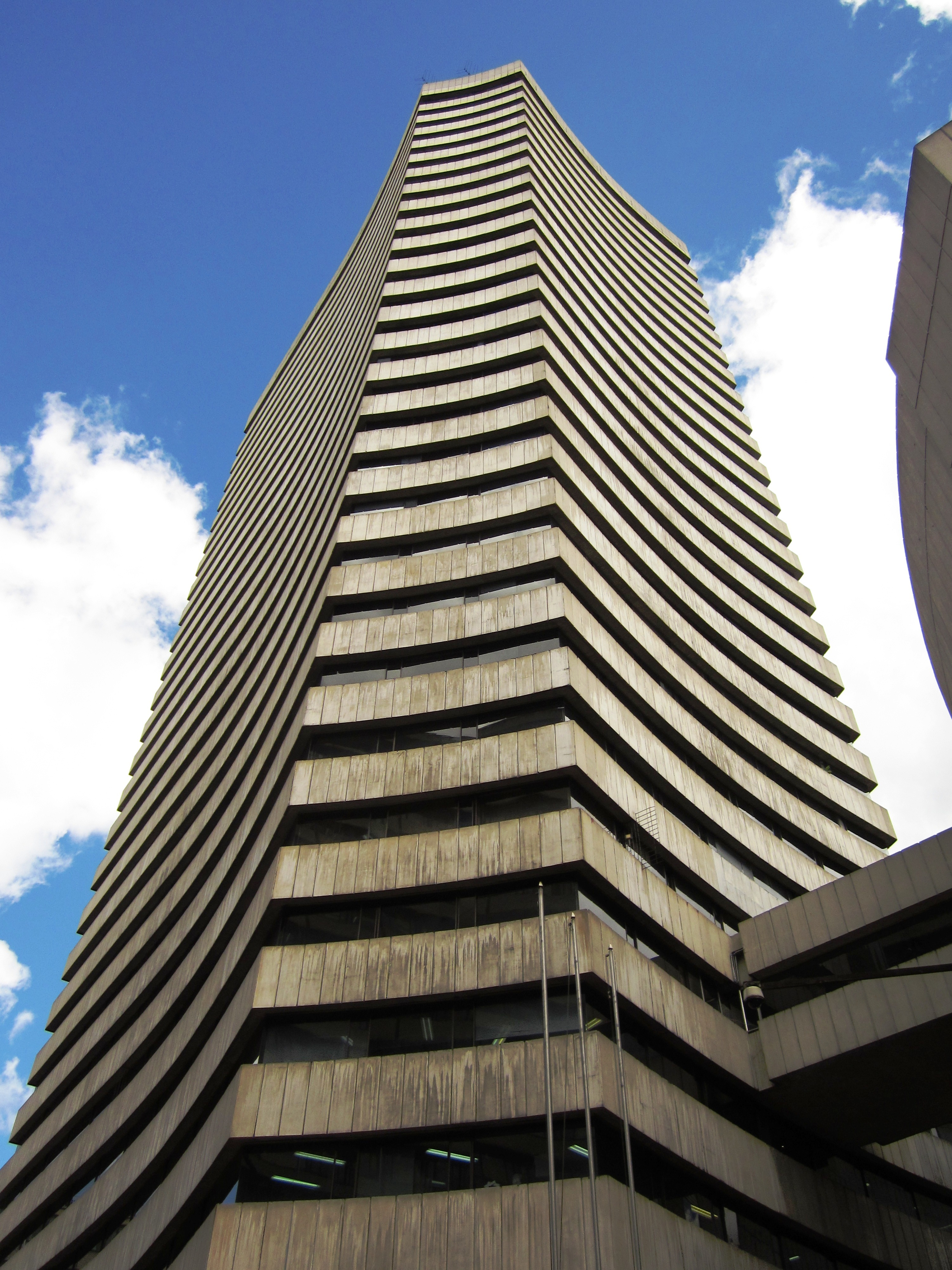
- Headquarters in Bogotá.

Agency overview
- Formed: April 29, 1830
- Headquarters: Carrera 5ª № 15-60; Bogotá, D.C., Colombia
- Annual budget: COP$541.314.589.000 (2016)
- Agency executives: Margarita Cabello, Inspector General; Antonio Emiro Thomas Arias, Vicesolicitor General
- Child agency: Ombudsman's Office of Colombia
- Website: www.procuraduria.gov.co

The Office of the Inspector General of Colombia (Spanish: Procuraduría General de Colombia) is a Colombian independent public institution overseeing both the public conduct of those in authority or in charge of exercising a public office and the correct functioning of other government institutions and agencies. The Office of the Inspector General of Colombia is not a judicial institution; it is one of the Colombian Control Institutions, alongside the Office of the Controller General. The Inspector General is also charged with safeguarding the rights of the people, guaranteeing human rights protection and intervening in the name of the people in the defence of the public's interest.

== Functions ==
According to the Colombian Constitution of 1991, one of the main purposes of the Inspector General is to prevent, intervene and start disciplinary actions. It prevents before having to take action; it is charged with overseeing public officials' performance and warns of any violation to the current norms. It intervenes in the different jurisdictions in defence of the legal order, public funds and fundamental rights and freedoms. The Inspector General is in charge of initiating, developing and ruling investigations against public officials in accordance with the Unique Disciplinary Code.

== Criticism ==
In July 2022, then president-elect Gustavo Petro claimed that he would promote the removal of the Office of the Inspector General, with the purpose of "listening to the judgment of the Inter-American Court of Human Rights and in the process respecting the American Convention." He added that the apparatus's funding would be spent in "strengthening" judiciary power, and establishing "the great Anti-Corruption Prosecutor's Office."

Colombian politicians like Juan Manuel Galán Pachón and Piedad Córdoba have supported this change, calling the institution a "monarchical, old, expensive institution" and a "tool of persecution of the extreme right —a biased body that protects political clans," respectively.

In an interview with El Tiempo, lawyers Juan Carlos Ospina and Silvia Serrano stated that "the proposal for the elimination or complete transformation of the Attorney General's Office goes beyond what was ordered by the Inter-American Court" and that "the ruling of the Inter-American Court of Human Rights did not order the elimination of the control body or the transferring of its functions to the judiciary but to adapt the domestic system so that the Attorney General's Office does not have the power to dismiss or disqualify popularly elected officials."

== List of officeholders ==
No.	Portrait	Name	Took office	Left office	President(s)
1		Mario Aramburu	1967	1970	Carlos Lleras Restrepo
2		Jesús Bernal	1971	1974	Misael Pastrana Borrero
3		Jaime Serrano	1974	1978	Alfonso López Michelsen
4		Guillermo González	1978	1982	Julio César Turbay Ayala
5		Carlos Jiménez Gómez	1982	1986	Belisario Betancur
6		Carlos Mauro Hoyos	September 17, 1986	January 25, 1988	Virgilio Barco
-		Horacio Serpa	1988	1989	Virgilio Barco
7		Alfonso Gómez Méndez	1989	1900	César Gaviria
8		Carlos Gustavo Arrieta	1990	1994	César Gaviria
9		Orlando Vásquez	September 1, 1994	November 28, 1996	Ernesto Samper
10		Jaime Bernal	December 12, 1996	January 1, 2001	Andrés Pastrana
11		Edgardo Maya	January 12, 2001	January 13, 2009	Álvaro Uribe
12		Alejandro Ordóñez	January 16, 2009	September 8, 2016	Juan Manuel Santos
13		Fernando Carrillo	January 17, 2016	August 27, 2020	Iván Duque
14		Margarita Cabello	August 27, 2020	Incumbent	Gustavo Petro
