= Office of the Comptroller General of Colombia =

Colombia's highest fiscal oversight body

Office of the Comptroller General of the Republic
- Contraloría General de la República
- Flag of Office of the Comptroller General

- Logo of Office of the Comptroller General

Agency overview
- Formed: July 19, 1923
- Preceding agency: Court of Auditors
- Headquarters: Carrera 69 44-35 Bogotá, Colombia
- Employees: 4,057
- Annual budget: COP$242,019,000 (est. 2008); COP$331,942,394,271 (est. 2010)
- Agency executives: Carlos Mario Zuluaga Pardo, Vice Comptroller acting as Comptroller General of the Republic; Luis Enrique Abadía García, Office Director of Comptroller General of the Republic
- Child agency: Office of the Auditor General
- Website: www.contraloriagen.gov.co

The Office of the Comptroller General of the Republic of Colombia (Spanish: Contraloría General de la República de Colombia) is a Colombian independent government institution that acts as the highest form of fiscal control in the country. As such, it has a mission to seek the proper allocation of resources and public funds and contribute to the modernization of the state, by means of continuous improvement in the various public entities. It is one of the Colombian Control Institutions along with the Office of the Inspector General of Colombia.

== History ==
In 1923, after several years of financial crisis, President Pedro Nel Ospina requested an expert committee to study Colombian economic conditions. This committee, led by American economist Edwin Walter Kemmerer (referred to in an expression of the time as a money doctor) was called the Kemmerer Mission. Kemmerer had already worked with Latin American governments; that of Mexico in 1917 and of Guatemala in 1919.

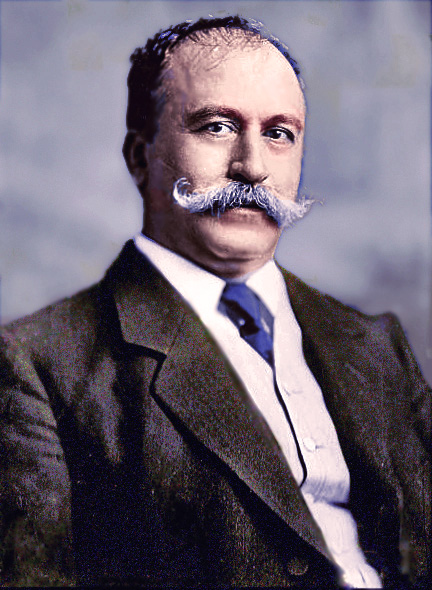
President Pedro Nel Ospina approved Law 42 which created the Office of the Comptroller General

Up until then the Court of Auditors (Spanish: Corte de Cuentas) was the accountability agency of the nation, it was an agency of judicial and fiscal nature, but it was part of the Executive Branch. A study led by the Kemmerer Mission, with the assistance of the Colombian Finance Minister Esteban Jaramillo, recommended Congress to create the Bank of the Republic, and the Office of the Comptroller General, and to structure the laws for this function using those already existing. The Kemmerer Mission recommended the creation of the Office of the Comptroller General after considering that it could establish the necessary means for imposing a strict observance of the laws and administrative norms in the management of resources and public funds.

Government introduced new legislation in Congress following the recommendations of the Kemmerer Mission. Law 42 of 1923 was passed by Congress and signed by the President of the Senate Luis de Greiff and the President of the Chamber of Representatives Ignacio Moreno. The new law was approved and signed by President Nel Ospina and his Minister of Finance Gabriel Posada, and finally ratified by Congress on July 19, 1923.

The Office of the Comptroller General began functioning on September 1, 1923, when Law 42 took effect. The first Comptroller General of the Republic was Eugenio Andrade, who was appointed by President Ospina. The current Comptroller General is Carlos Felipe Córdoba Larrarte.
