= Women in Colombia =

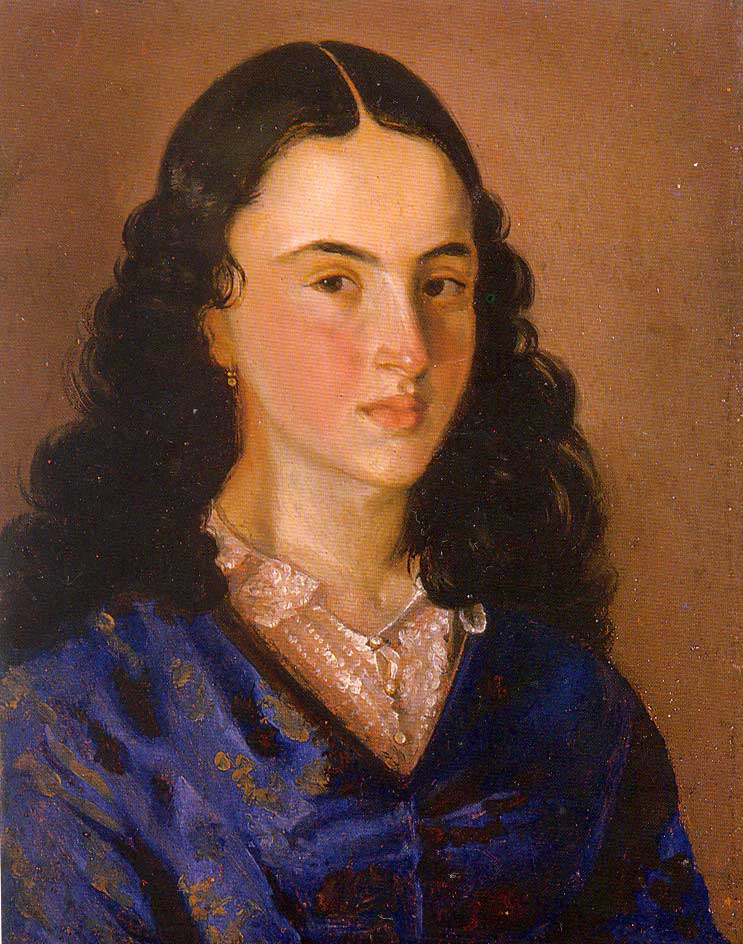
- Policarpa Salavarrieta, heroine of the Colombian Independence Movement. Portrait by Jose Maria Espinosa, 1855

General statistics
- Maternal mortality (per 100,000): 92 (2010)
- Women in parliament: 20% (2014)
- Women over 25 with secondary education: 56.9% (2012)
- Women in labour force: 60% (2014)

Gender Inequality Index
- Value: 0.424 (2021)
- Rank: 102nd out of 191

Global Gender Gap Index
- Value: 0.710 (2022)
- Rank: 75th out of 146

As established in the Colombian Constitution of 1991, women in Colombia have the right to bodily integrity and autonomy; to vote (see also: Elections in Colombia); to hold public office; to work; to fair wages or equal pay; to own property; to receive an education; to serve in the military in certain duties, but are excluded from combat arms units; to enter into legal contracts; and to have marital, parental and religious rights. Women's rights in Colombia have been gradually developing since the early 20th century.

== History ==
=== Background ===
Women in Colombia have been very important in military aspects, serving mainly as supporters or spies such as in the case of Policarpa Salavarrieta who played a key role in the independence of Colombia from the Spanish Empire. Some indigenous groups such as the Wayuu hold a matriarchal society in which a woman's role is central and the most important for their society. Women belonging to indigenous groups were highly targeted by the Spanish colonizers during the colonial era. Many indigenous women were subject to slavery, rape and the loss of their cultural identity.

Throughout the colonial era, the 19th century and the establishment of the republican era, Colombian women were relegated to be housewives in a male dominated society. Education for women was limited to the wealthy and they were only allowed to study until middle school in monastery under Roman Catholic education. On December 10, 1934 the Congress of Colombia presented a law to give women the right to study. The law generated controversy, as did any issue related to women's rights at the time.

=== Educational rights ===
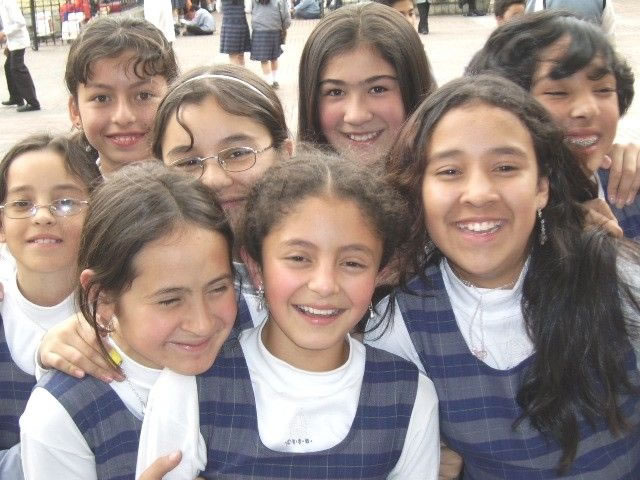
School girls in Colombia

Before 1933 women in Colombia were only allowed schooling until middle school level education. Liberal congressman Jorge Eliécer Gaitán defended the decree Number 1972 of 1933 to allow women to receive higher education schooling, while the conservative Germán Arciniegas opposed it. The decree passed and was signed by the Liberal government of Alfonso López Pumarejo. The state-owned National University of Colombia was the first higher education institution to allow female students. Gerda Westendorp was admitted on February 1, 1935, to study medicine. Gabriela Peláez, who was admitted as a student in 1936 and graduated as a lawyer, became the first female to ever graduate from a university in Colombia. In 1936, María Carulla founded the first school of social works under the support of the Our Lady of the Rosary University. After this, women began to be seen by many as equal to men for their academic achievements, creativity, and discipline. At the same time, citizens began to support the idea of citizenship for women following the example of other countries. The constant political violence, social issues, and economic problems were among the main subjects of study for women, mainly in the areas of family violence and couple relationships, and also in children abuse.

=== Legal contracts rights ===
A group of women led by Georgina Fletcher met with then-president of Colombia Enrique Olaya Herrera with the intention of asking him to support the transformation of the Colombian legislation regarding women's rights to administer properties. The law was named ley sobre Régimen de Capitulaciones Matrimoniales ("Law about marriage capitulations regime") which was later proposed in congress in December 1930 by Ofelia Uribe as a constitutional reform. The law's main objective was to enable women to administer their properties by themselves instead of their husbands, male relatives or tutors, as had been the case previously. The move generated a scandal in congress. It did not pass, and later generated persecutions and plotting against the group of women. As leader of the group, Georgina Fletcher was persecuted and isolated. The Régimen de Capitulaciones Matrimoniales was once again presented in congress in 1932 and approved into Law 28 of 1932.

=== Suffrage rights ===
Women's right to suffrage was granted by Colombian political Gustavo Rojas Pinilla in 1954, but had its origins in the 1930s with the struggle of women to acquire full citizenship. In 1957 women first voted in Colombia on a plebiscite.

=== Family life ===
Cohabitation is very common in this country, and the majority of children are born outside of marriage. In the 2000s, 55,8% of births were to cohabiting mothers, 22,9% to married mothers, and 21,3% to single mothers (not living with a partner). Family life has changed dramatically during the last decades: in the 1970s, 68,8% of births were inside marriage; and divorce was legalized only in 1991.

== Issues ==
=== Abortion ===
Abortion in Colombia has been historically severely restricted, with the laws being loosened in 2006 and 2009 (before 2006 Colombia was one of few counties in the world to have a complete ban on abortion); and in 2022 abortion on request was legalized to the 24th week of pregnancy, by a ruling of the Constitutional Court on February 21, 2022. Up until that point, women who had abortions in this largely Catholic nation faced sentences ranging from 16 to 54 months in prison. According to this decision, women may obtain an abortion up until the sixth month of pregnancy for any reason. A 2006 court decision that also allowed doctors to refuse to perform abortions based on personal beliefs stated that this was previously only permitted in cases of rape, if the mother's health was in danger, or if the fetus had an untreatable malformation.

=== The armed conflict ===
The armed conflict in the country has had a very negative effect on women, especially by exposing them to gender-based violence. It is reported that one in five of women who were displaced due to the conflict were raped.

=== Domestic violence ===
In the 1990s, Colombia enacted Ley 294 de 1996, in order to fight domestic violence. In 2008, Ley 1257 de 2008, a comprehensive law against violence against women, was enacted. Marital rape was criminalized in 1996. Article 42 of the Constitution of Colombia provides that "Family relations are based on the equality of rights and duties of the couple and on the mutual respect of all its members. Any form of violence in the family is considered destructive of its harmony and unity, and will be sanctioned according to law."

=== Female genital mutilation ===
Some native tribes (Emberá, Arhuaco, Koguis) are known to practice female genital mutilation, but there is a law against it, enacted in August 2026.

== See also ==
- Lissette Ochoa domestic violence case
