= Ombudsman's Office of Colombia =

Ombudsman's Office
- Defensoría del Pueblo
- Logo of the Ombudsman's Office

Agency overview
- Formed: December 15, 1992
- Headquarters: Calle 55 № 10-32/46; Bogotá, Colombia
- Annual budget: COP$101,674,740,000 (est. 2007); COP$232,102,004,172 (est. 2010)
- Agency executive: Iris Marín, Ombudsman
- Parent agency: Office of the Inspector General
- Website: www.defensoria.org.co

The Ombudsman's Office of Colombia (Spanish: Defensoría del Pueblo) is the national government agency that is charged with overseeing the protection of civil and human rights within the legal framework of the Republic of Colombia. The ombudsman, or People's Defender (Spanish: Defensor del Pueblo), is an official appointed by the President, and elected by the Chamber of Representatives of Colombia, to head this agency.

The Ombudsman’s Office is funded through the Inspector General’s Office, but it operates independently in administration and budget. In addition to its complaint-handling role, the Ombudsman is the national human rights institution, accredited with A status by the ICC.
