= Social class in Colombia =

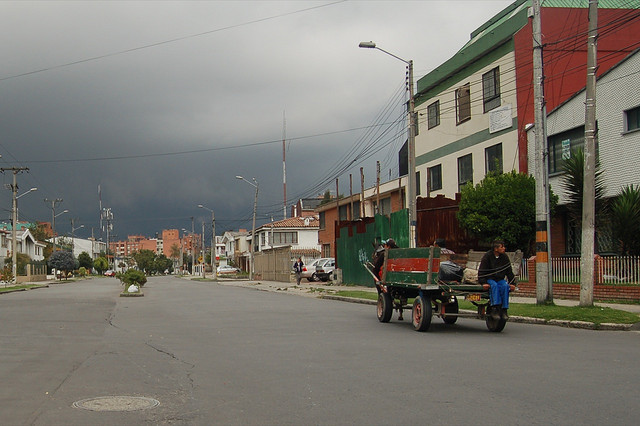
Poor people in a horse-drawn buggy collect trash in a lower-middle-class neighborhood in Bogotá.

There have always been marked distinctions of social class in Colombia, although twentieth-century economic development has increased social mobility to some extent. Distinctions are based on wealth, social status, and race. Informal networks (roscas) centered on a person in a position of power are one factor in upper-class dominance. Official demographic categories based mainly on housing characteristics shed some light on the socioeconomic makeup of the population.

== History ==
Since the sixteenth century, Colombian society has been highly stratified, with social classes generally linked to racial or wealth distinctions, and vertical mobility has been limited. The proportion of white ancestry has been an important measure of status for the mixed groups since the colonial era. In the nineteenth century, Colombia's rugged terrain and inadequate transportation system reinforced social and geographic distance, keeping the numerically superior but disunited masses fragmented and powerless. The nascent middle class lacked a collective consciousness, preferring to identify individually with the upper class. Except in certain instances of urban artisans and some Amerindian communities, the elite was the only social group with sufficient cohesion to articulate goals and make them known to the rest of the society. In the twentieth century, the society began to experience change, not so much in values or orientation as in broadening of the economic bases and an expansion of the social classes. Improvements in transportation, communications, and education—coupled with industrialization and rapid urban growth—opened Colombian society somewhat by expanding economic opportunities. These advances, although mixed, have continued during the first decade of the present century.

Throughout Colombia's history, class structure has played a significant role in society. Class has been a dominant factor with regard to economics, politics, and social parameters. The social structures that were put into place during the colonial era left a legacy of hierarchy that continued to shape Colombian society even after the fall of the chattel slavery system in 1851. Because of the social-economic dynamic that has to exist in order for the institution of slavery to flourish, it is a heavy burden to completely modify cultural standards that have been firmly established for many years. There are patterns that develop along with certain behaviors in how those in power interact with those that have little or no control. In Colombia, this means that whites (who have held power since the 16th century) exercised control over the indigenous population as well as those imported from Africa. So when the practice of slavery ended, the attitude of whites was still to maintain control over economics and politics, thereby ensuring that they would remain at the top of the nation's power structure. This is a true of most locations that were heavily impacted by the Atlantic Slave Trade.

== Determinants of social classes ==
The many terms for color still being used reflect the persistence of this colonial pattern and a continuing desire among Colombians to classify each other according to color and social group. These terms also cut across class lines so that persons at one level define themselves as being racially similar to those at other levels. The confusion over classification has affected most Colombians because most of them do not define themselves as being white, black, or Amerindian, which are distinct and mutually exclusive groups, but as belonging to one of the mixed categories. In addition to racial and wealth factors, Colombia's classes are distinguished by education, family background, lifestyle, occupation, power, and geographic residence. In Colombia, those of European, African, and Native heritage inter-mixed rigidly. This placed more of an emphasis of social class than racial identity, although race does play somewhat of a factor in Colombian culture. Most of Colombia's population identifies racially as either "mestizo" (a mix of European and Native heritage) or Afro-Colombian (of African and either European or Native descent). Roughly seventy-five percent of Colombians claim to be of mixed heritage, while whites make up approximately twenty percent, with the rest of the makeup being four percent pure African descent and one percent native.

Due to a large proportion of the population who identify as mixed-blood (either mestizo or Afro-Colombian) it is widely accepted that race is not an issue in Colombia. This was by design, as the Colombian government sought to phase out racial dimensions with the use of mestizaje; this was a purposeful intermixing of Africans and Natives with white Spaniards in efforts at creating a new race. This was not completely effective, as division among Colombia's elite, middle, and lower class is directly related to racial concepts. In effect, darker skin (Afro and Native) is associated with lower social status; moving up the status chain means that "whiteness" becomes more pronounced. While this is not the dynamic faced in a place like the U.S., where any African blood immediately placed one at the bottom of the social and economic food-chain, racial division is still a part of everyday life in Colombia. The difference with Colombia is that there were never any systematic legal designations put in place in order to divide society along racial lines like the Jim Crow system of the U.S. In Colombia, the division is ingrained in the culture, especially with regard to economic opportunity and education. "Whiteness" in Colombia has been the goal of society since the mid-19th century, when trends towards identifying with European culture instead of indigenous or mestizo became popular. This included encouraging those of indigenous or mestizo blood to aspire to climb up the social ladder by becoming more European in dress, occupation, and manners. In essence, the more that those of color sought to align themselves with white or European culture, the more opportunities to advance both economically and socially were given. Within every class, there are numerous subtle gradations in status. Colombians tend to be extremely status-conscious, and class identity is an important aspect of social life because it regulates the interaction of groups and individuals. Social-class boundaries are far more flexible in the city than in the countryside, but consciousness of status and class distinctions continues to permeate social life throughout Colombia.

The role of women in Colombia has also been a source of complexity in Colombian society. Because women are seen as being beneath men in most regards, women have had to struggle to assume a role in Colombian society other than being bearers of children. Because most of Latin America is seen as a machismo society, where men wield power and women are subordinates, women have been in a position of having to assert themselves in order to gain basic rights and to become individuals instead of just a trophy of men. During the 19th century when ideas from the Liberalism ideology swept Latin America, the role of women began to be discussed as a means of understanding how women could be valuable members of society rather than brainless puppets. Because Liberalism stresses individual freedoms, equality, and individualism, when it became the backbone of revolution it could not be placed in a position to be used by Latin American men only; women wanted to enjoy the benefits of liberalism as well. Conservative factions regained control of Colombian politics in 1885, effectively erasing some of the gains that women had made socially (such as the right to divorce). This caused women to be placed back into traditional roles as private and invisible members of society once again, limiting the growth of women's rights and returning them to pre-Revolution gender roles whereby men had absolute control. A proper education for women was one that reinforced traditional roles for women of being a homemaker and mother. In this regard, education was not used a vehicle to uplift women and help them to gain power in society structures, but instead to emphasize that women were to be a support mechanism for males and nothing more. This attitude towards the advancement of women was intended to keep women in a box rather than to see them becomes leaders outside the home, whereby they would be taking over power from males in authority positions.

== Class characteristics ==
The upper class is very successful in maintaining exclusivity and controlling change through a system of informal decision-making groups called roscas—the name of a twisted pastry. Such groups exist at different levels and across different spheres and are linked hierarchically by personal relationships. Their composition varies according to level—municipal, departmental, or national—but each group tries to include at least one powerful person from every sphere. A rosca is a vitally important system in both the social and the political context because it is at this level of interaction that most political decisions are made and careers determined. Only as a member of such a group can an individual be considered a member of the upper-middle or upper class. Indeed, the listed names of past presidents reflect how power has remained the purview of a small number of elite families instead of a meritocracy.

Colombia has an abundance of families that belonged to the middle-class sector of society and are struggling between the need to survive and the desire to give their children a good education. The lower-middle class, constituting the bulk of the middle class, comes primarily from upwardly mobile members of the lower class. A large number are clerks or small shopkeepers. Many have only a precarious hold on middle-class status and tend to be less concerned with imitating upper-class culture and behavior than with making enough money to sustain a middle-class lifestyle. Such families tend to be just as concerned as those at higher social levels with giving their children an education. Many hope to send at least one of their children through a university, regardless of the financial burden.

== Official strata divisions ==
The official strata division provides another look at social classes. A 1994 law provides "an instrument that allows a municipality or district to classify its population in distinct groups or strata with similar social and economic characteristics". The law was framed this way to establish cross-class subsidies that would help those in the lower strata pay for utilities. Housing characteristics, such as a garage, a front yard, and quality of the neighborhood, are the main criteria used. Depending on the diversity and quality of housing, there could be six strata: level one is lower-low, two is low, three is upper-low, four is medium, five is medium-high, and six is high. Most cities have all six, but there are towns that have only three. This national classification identifies groups with similar socioeconomic characteristics. Although strata are not a direct reflection of social class, they provide useful information beyond income measures.

The great majority of the population (89 percent) lives in strata one, two, and three, and on that basis, even if not by other criteria, is considered poor. Strata four, five, and six house only 6.5 percent, 1.9 percent, and 1.5 percent of the population, respectively. In other words, only about 10 percent of the population lives in dwellings that are well built and located in well-developed neighborhoods with access to good utility services.

The overlap between these official strata and social class is not perfect. It is possible to find very high-income people living in stratum three and some stratum-six residents who have strong affinity with the lower classes. There are several reasons for these coexisting disparities, the main one being perhaps the strong upward mobility allowed by the illegal-drug industry wealth that did not necessarily lead to a change in self-perception. The living expenses of this group of drug traffickers are very high, but they retain some of the cultural identity, education, and self-perceptions of the lower classes.

== See also ==
- Race and ethnicity in Colombia
- Poverty in Colombia
- Middle class in Colombia
