= Children's rights in Colombia =

Human rights of children in Columbia

Children' rights in Colombia (Spanish: Derechos de los niños en Colombia) is the status of children's rights in the Republic of Colombia. Colombia signed the Convention on the Rights of the Child in 1989 and later ratified the CRC on September 2, 1990. Internally issues related to children are mostly under the Instituto Colombiano de Bienestar Familiar, or the ICBF, which is translated as the Colombian Institute for Family Welfare.

The average school-leaving age in Colombia is 12. The numerous internal conflicts in which Colombia has been involved, has used children for combat related duties throughout the years, as well as political, social and economic instability have pushed for child labor. More recently the current internal armed conflict, while the government enforces the enlistment of adults in the military under the legal age, 18-year-olds, the guerrillas and paramilitary groups resort to the recruitment, sometimes forced, of children for combat. Between 11,000 and 14,000 children are estimated to be involved with left-wing guerrilla groups and right-wing paramilitaries in Colombia. According to Human Rights Watch, "Approximately 80 percent of child combatants in Colombia belong to one of the two left-wing guerrilla groups, the FARC or ELN. The remainder fights in paramilitary ranks."

Moreover the children are also affected by the violence of war and the forced displacement that has come with it. Colombia has one of the highest number of victims of land mines in the world, most of the victims being children.

== Emmanuel ==
In 2002, FARC guerrillas kidnapped presidential candidate Ingrid Betancourt and secretary Clara Rojas. A general rumor spread that Rojas was pregnant in captivity after a relationship with a guerrilla leader. This was later confirmed by Jhon Frank Pinchao, a policeman who was also in captivity under the FARC along Betancourt and Rojas and escaped. Pinchao said that Rojas had a child in captivity named Emmanuel and he was being raised by the guerrillas.

=== Child sexual abuse ===
Child pornography and sexual exploitation are issues in Colombia. Children are mainly affected by poverty and end up in local brothels; others are placed into regional and international prostitution trade networks. These networks are often run by bigger cartels associated to illegal drug trade, weapons smuggling, and counterfeiting. Children may be traded to neighboring countries like Venezuela, or to markets in countries in Europe, the Middle East or Asia.

== See also ==
- List of children's rights topics
