= Human rights in Iran =

From Pahlavi Iran (1925 to 1979), through the Iranian Revolution (1979), to the era of the Islamic Republic of Iran (1979 to present), government treatment of Iranian citizens' rights has been criticized by Iranians, international human rights activists, writers, and NGOs. While the monarchy under the rule of the shahs was widely attacked by most Western watchdog organizations for having an abysmal human rights record, the government of the Islamic Republic which succeeded it is considered still worse by many. Over the decades, various groups, including political dissidents, religious minorities, and ethnic communities have faced systematic repression, with state policies often targeting not only political opposition but also cultural and linguistic identity.

The Pahlavi dynasty—Reza Shah Pahlavi and his son Mohammad Reza Shah Pahlavi—has been described as a "royal dictatorship", or "one-man rule", and employed secret police, torture, and executions to stifle political dissent. During Mohammad Reza Shah Pahlavi's reign, Amnesty International estimated the number of political prisoners executed to be over 300.

Under the Islamic Republic, the prison system was centralized and drastically expanded; in one early period (1981–1985), more than 7900 people were executed. The Islamic Republic has been criticized both for restrictions and punishments that follow the Islamic Republic's constitution and law, but not international human rights norms (harsh penalties for crimes, punishment of victimless crimes, restrictions on freedom of speech and the press, restrictions on freedom of religion, etc.); and for "extrajudicial" actions that follow neither, such as firebombings of newspaper offices, and beatings, torture, rape, and killing without trial of political prisoners and dissidents/civilians.

== Pahlavi Iran (1925 to 1979) ==
Pahlavi Iran (the Iranian state under the Pahlavi dynasty) lasted from 1925 to 1979. The use of torture and abuse of prisoners varied at times during the Pahlavi reign, according to one history. Both of the two monarchs – Reza Shah Pahlavi and his son Mohammad Reza Shah Pahlavi – employed censorship, secret police, torture, and executions.

=== Reza Shah era ===
The reign of Reza Shah was authoritarian and dictatorial.The Age of the Dictators: A Study of the European Dictatorships, 1918–53, D. G. Williamson. Freedom of the press, workers' rights, and political freedoms were restricted under Reza Shah. Independent newspapers were closed down, political parties – even the loyal Revival party – were banned. The government banned all trade unions in 1927, and arrested 150 labor organizers between 1927 and 1932.

Physical force was used against some kinds of prisoners – common criminals, suspected spies, and those accused of plotting regicide. Burglars in particular were subjected to the bastinado (beating the soles of the feet), and the strappado (being suspended in the air by means of a rope tied around the victims arms) to "reveal their hidden loot". Suspected spies and assassins were "beaten, deprived of sleep, and subjected to the qapani" (the binding of arms tightly behind the back) which sometimes caused a joint to crack. But for political prisoners – who were primarily Communists – there was a "conspicuous absence of torture" under Reza Shah's rule. The main form of pressure was solitary confinement and the withholding of "books, newspapers, visitors, food packages, and proper medical care". While often threatened with the qapani, political prisoners "were rarely subjected to it."

=== Mohammad Reza Shah era ===
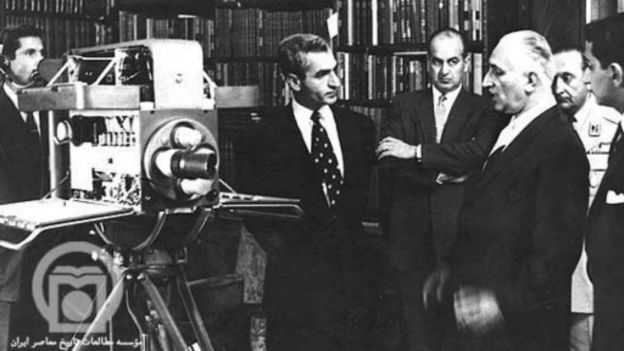
Nematollah Nassiri, head of shah's secret police SAVAK, with Mohammad Reza Shah Pahlavi, 1970

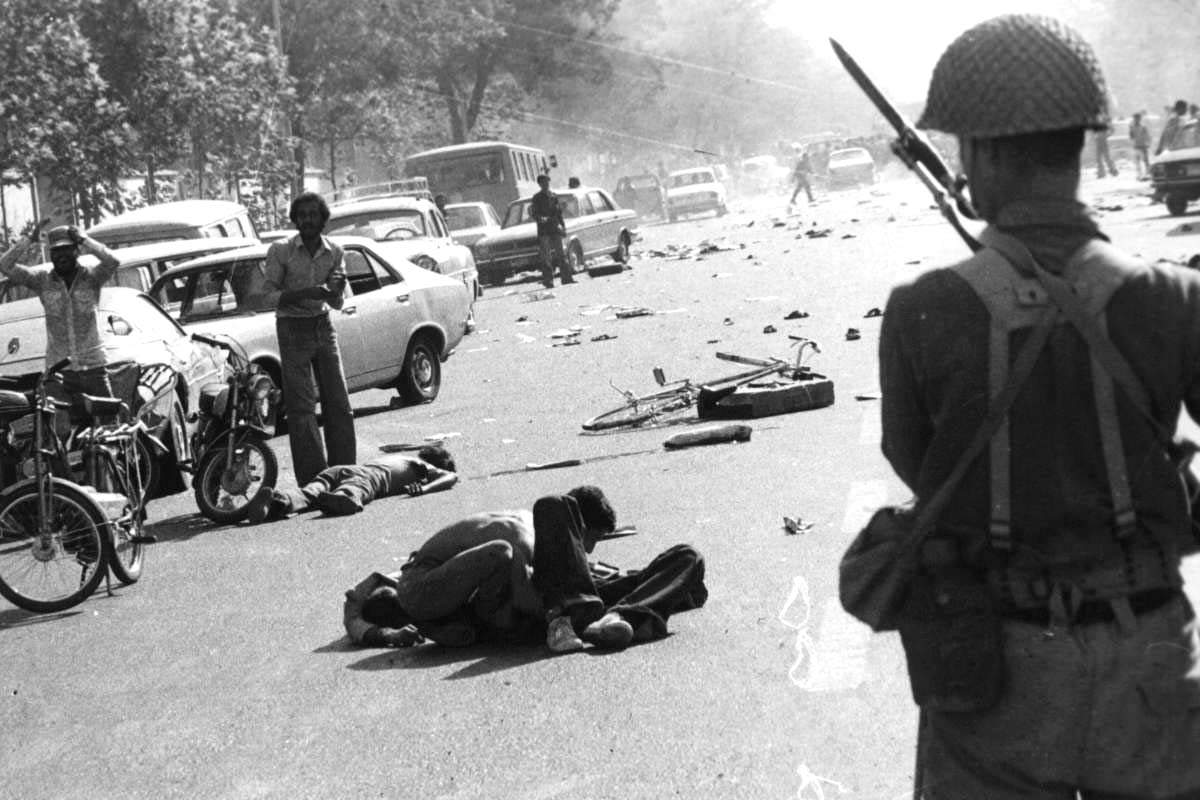
Protesters killed by the Shah's regime on Black Friday, 1978

Mohammad Reza became monarch after his father was deposed following the Anglo-Soviet invasion of Iran in 1941. Political prisoners (mostly Communists) were released by the occupying powers, and the shah (crown prince at the time) no longer had control of the parliament. But after an attempted assassination of the Shah in 1949, he was able to declare martial law, imprison communists and other opponents, and restrict criticism of the royal family in the press.

Following the pro-Shah coup d'état that overthrew the Prime Minister Mohammad Mosaddegh in 1953, the Shah again cracked down on his opponents, and political freedom waned. He outlawed Mosaddegh's political group the National Front, and arrested most of its leaders. Over 4000 political activists of the Tudeh party were arrested, (including 477 in the armed forces), forty were executed, another 14 died under torture and over 200 were sentenced to life imprisonment.

During the height of its power, the shah's secret police SAVAK had virtually unlimited powers. The agency closely collaborated with the CIA.

According to Amnesty International's Annual Report for 1974–1975 "the total number of political prisoners has been reported at times throughout the year [1975] to be anything from 25,000 to 100,000."

==== 1971–77 ====
In 1971, a guerrilla attack on a gendarmerie post (where three police were killed and two guerrillas freed, known as the "Siahkal incident") sparked "an intense guerrilla struggle" against the government, and harsh government countermeasures. Guerrillas embracing "armed struggle" to overthrow the Shah, and inspired by international Third World anti-imperialist revolutionaries (Mao Zedong, Ho Chi Minh, and Che Guevara), were quite active in the first half of the 1970s (Note: In the two and half years from mid 1973 through 1975, three United States colonels, an Iranian general, sergeant, and a Persian translator of the United States Embassy were all assassinated by guerrilla groups) when hundreds of them died in clashes with government forces and dozens of Iranians were executed. According to Amnesty International, the Shah carried out at least 300 political executions.

Torture was used to locate arms caches, safe houses and accomplices of the guerrillas, and also in attempts to induce enemies of the state to become supporters.

In 1975, the human rights group Amnesty International – whose membership and international influence grew greatly during the 1970s – issued a report on treatment of political prisoners in Iran that was "extensively covered in the European and American Press". By 1976, this repression was softened considerably thanks to publicity and scrutiny by "numerous international organizations and foreign newspapers" as well as the newly elected President of the United States, Jimmy Carter.

==== Iranian Revolution ====
The 1978–79 Iranian Revolution overthrowing the Pahlavi government started with demonstrations in October 1977 and ended on 11 February 1979 with the defeat of the Shah's troops. During the revolution, protestors were fired upon by troops and prisoners were executed. The human rights violations contributed directly to the Shah's demise, (Note: A Persian-speaking British diplomat noted that the gulf between shah and public was now unbridgeable – both because of Black Friday and because of the Abadan fire.) (as did his scruples in not violating human rights as much as his general urged him to, according to some).

The deaths of the popular and influential modernist Islamist leader Ali Shariati and the Ayatollah Ruhollah Khomeini's son Mostafa, in 1977, were believed to be assassinations perpetrated by SAVAK by many Iranians. On 8 September 1978, (Black Friday) troops fired on religious demonstrators in Zhaleh (or Jaleh) Square. The clerical leadership announced that "thousands have been massacred by Zionist troops" (i.e. Pro-Israel troops rumored to be aiding the Shah), Michel Foucault reported 4000 had been killed, and another European journalist reported that the military left behind a `carnage`. Johann Beukes, author of Foucault in Iran, 1978–1979, notes that "Foucault seems to have adhered to this exaggerated death count at Djaleh Square, propagated by the revolting masses themselves. Thousands were wounded, but the death toll unlikely accounted to more than hundred casualties". According to the historian Abbas Amanat:

The clerical activists, backed by the Qom marja's, capitalized on the Jaleh Square massacre to paint the regime as brutal and illegitimate. Aided by a rumor-mongering machine that became fully operational in the absence of reliable media and news reporting, the number of casualties, the “martyrs” on the path of Islam, was inflated to thousands, and the troops who opened fire on them were labeled as Israeli mercenaries who were brought in to crush the revolution.

Post-revolutionary accounting by Emadeddin Baghi, of the government Foundation of Martyrs and Veterans Affairs, found 88 people killed on Black Friday: 64 (including two females) in Jaleh Square, and 24 (including one woman) in other parts of the capital. According to the military historian Spencer C. Tucker, 94 were killed on Black Friday, consisting of 64 protesters and 30 government security forces. According to the Iranologist Richard Foltz, 64 protesters died at Jaleh Square.

== Islamic Republic (1979 to present) ==
=== Post-revolution ===
==== New Constitution ====
The new constitution of the Islamic Republic was adopted by referendum in December 1979. (Note: The constitution was and amended almost ten years later but the changes were about the eliminating the need for the Supreme Leader to be a marja chosen by popular acclaim, did not involve human rights.) Although Ayatollah Khomeini was the undisputed leader of the revolution, he had many supporters who hoped the revolution would replace the Shah with a democratic republic. Consequently, the constitution combined conventional liberal democratic mandates for an elected president and legislature, and civil and political rights for its citizens, with theocratic elements Khomeini desired. But it was theocracy that was pre-eminent. The constitution vested sovereignty in God, mandated non-elected governing bodies/authorities to supervise the elected ones, and subordinated the civil/political rights to the laws/precepts/principles of Islam,

Some of the ways that basics of law in Iran clashed with the Universal Declaration of Human Rights after 1979 included:

- The use of Classical Islamic law (Sharia), such as
  - victimless crimes: '“insulting the prophet,” “apostasy,” adultery, same-sex relations (all potentially punishable by death), drinking of alcoholic beverages, failure (for a woman) to wear hijab,
  - harsh punishments: stoning to death, amputation, lashing, retribution (or qisas, aka "Eye for an eye") which can include blinding the offender.
  - unequal rights for women in several areas: a woman is not valued the same as a man in blood money (diya), in inheritance, in court testimony (making conviction for rape of women difficult if not impossible in Iran), a woman needs her husband's permission to work outside the home or leave the country. covering of hair is compulsory.
  - Trans women are viewed as prostitutes and face judgement and danger from the law due to this.
  - restrictions on religious freedom and equality:
    - Only Shia Muslims are eligible to become Supreme Leader or President. (non-Shia Muslims did not have equal rights with Shia).
    - Religiously based punishments include blasphemy.
    - Non-Muslims are encouraged to convert to Islam, but conversion from Islam to another religion (apostasy) is prohibited, and may be punishable by death; This is widely thought to explain the brutal treatment of Baháʼís who descend from Iranian Shia and hold that the Báb is the Mahdi of Shia Islam and his revelations supersede the Quran. (The IRI insist the Bahai are traitors and subversives.)
    - a Muslim man committing adultery with a Muslim woman is subject to 100 lashes, a non-Muslim man death.
    - Others subject to religious discrimination include Protestant Christians, (at least in part because of their "readiness to accept and even seek out Muslim converts"); irreligious, and otherwise orthodox Shia charged with apostasy for questioning the IRI doctrine of obeying the political "guardianship" of the Supreme Leader.
  - Children's rights: The age of maturity and criminal responsibility in international norms is 18 years, but mainstream Shia Jaʽfari jurisprudence (and the Iranian Civil Code) hold that a female becomes an adult at the age of 8 years and 9 months (i.e. 9 lunar years), and a male at 14 years and 7 months (i.e. 15 lunar years); a disparity that has led to the execution in Iran of large numbers of (what international law says are) juvenile offenders.
- The laws of the IRI do not follow "sharia exactly" and some slight modifications to it have made since 1979 that slightly improve the IRI human rights record:
  - in 2002, authorities placed a moratorium on execution by stoning, but as of 2018, women were still being sentenced to stoning in Iran.
  - in 2004 blood money was made more equal. Under traditional Islamic law, "blood money" (diya, financial compensation paid to the victim or heirs of a victim in the cases of murder, bodily harm or property damage) varies based on the gender and religion of the victim (Muslims and men being worth more). The International Religious Freedom Report reports that in 2004 the IRI parliament and Guardian Council reformed the law to equalized diya (also diyeh) between Muslim, Christian, Jewish, and Zoroastrian men. (Baháʼí men were excluded, since according to law there is no "blood money" for Baháʼí since their blood is considered Mobah, i.e. it can be spilled with impunity).
  - on 10 February 2012, Iran's parliament raised the minimum age for adulthood to 18 (solar years).

==== Velayat-e faqih and regime self-preservation ====
- The IRI has a number of laws and clauses in the constitution in violation of human rights provisions whose connection to classical sharia may be tenuous but that do mention protecting "principles of Islam" and have been used since 1979 to protect the government from dissent.
  - Restrictions on expression and media. The 1985 press law established press courts with the power to impose criminal penalties on individuals and to order closures of newspapers and periodicals, involved in "discourse harmful to the principles of Islam" and "public interest".
  - Restrictions on political freedom. Article 27 of the constitution limits "Public gatherings and marches" to those that "are not detrimental to the fundamental principles of Islam," and according to Human Rights Watch, "broadly worded 'security laws'" in Iran are used "to arbitrarily suppress and punish individuals for peaceful political expression, association, and assembly, in breach of international human rights treaties to which Iran is party". For example, "connections to foreign institutions, persons, or sources of funding" are enough to bring criminal charges such as "undermining national security" against individuals.
- In addition, some provisions of the constitution are believed to give the government license to go outside the constitution's own protections of civil and political rights, (for example article 167 of the constitution gives judges the discretion "to deliver his judgment on the basis of authoritative Islamic sources and authentic fatwa (rulings issued by qualified clerical jurists))." Under the Islamic Republic, assassinations and other killings, beatings, rapes, torture and imprisonment of dissidents by government forces without any sort of due process were often described as "extrajudicial". But former Revolutionary Guard turned dissident Akbar Ganji argues these were actually not outside the penal code of the Islamic Republic since the code "authorises a citizen to assassinate another if he is judged to be 'impious'". (Historian Ervand Abrahamian writes that the torture of prisoners and the execution of thousands of political prisoners in 1988 have been reported to follow at least some form of Islamic law and legal procedures.) According to Abrahamian, in the eyes of Iranian officials, "the survival of the Islamic Republic – and therefore of Islam itself – justified the means used," and trumped any right of the individual.
- Finally, in early 1988, shortly before his death, Imam Khomeini issued a fatwa ruling that Iran's Islamic government was "a branch of the Prophet's absolute Wilayat" and so important to Islam that it was one of "the primary (first order) rules of Islam" and that "ordinances of the law even praying, fasting and Hajj" were secondary ordinances over which Islamic government had "precedence". He wrote: "The Islamic State could prevent implementation of everything – devotional and non- devotional – that ... seems against Islam's interests". This doctrine – velayat-e motlaqaye faqih ("the absolute authority of the jurist") – indicated (according to Abrahamian) that "the survival of the Islamic Republic" and Islam itself were indeed tied together. It indicated to another scholar (Elizabeth Mayer) that the Islamic Republic was "freed ... to do as it chose – even if this meant violating fundamental pillars of the religion ..." (and, of course, the Iranian constitution) – and that velayat-e motlaqaye faqih, not sharia law, explained "the prevalence of torture and punishment of political dissent" in the Islamic Republic.

==== First decade ====
The vast majority of killings of political prisoners occurred in the first decade of the Islamic Republic, after which violent repression lessened.

After the revolution, the new regime worked to consolidate its rule. Human rights groups estimated the number of casualties suffered by protesters and prisoners of the Islamic government to be several thousand. The first to be executed were members of the old system – senior generals, followed by over 200 senior civilian officials. Their trials were brief and lacked defense attorneys, juries, transparency or the opportunity for the accused to defend themselves. By January 1980 "at least 582 persons" had been executed. In mid-August 1979, several dozen newspapers and magazines opposing Khomeini's idea of theocratic rule by jurists were shut down. Political parties were banned (the National Democratic Front in August 1979, the Muslim People's Republican Party in January 1980), a purge of universities started in March 1980.

Between January 1980 and June 1981 another 900 executions (at least) took place, for everything from drug and sexual offenses to "corruption on earth", from plotting counter-revolution and spying for Israel to membership in opposition groups. And in the year after that, at least 8,000 were executed. According to estimates provided by the military historian Spencer C. Tucker, in the period of 1980 to 1985, between 25,000 and 40,000 Iranians were arrested, 15,000 Iranians were tried and 8,000 to 9,500 Iranians were executed.

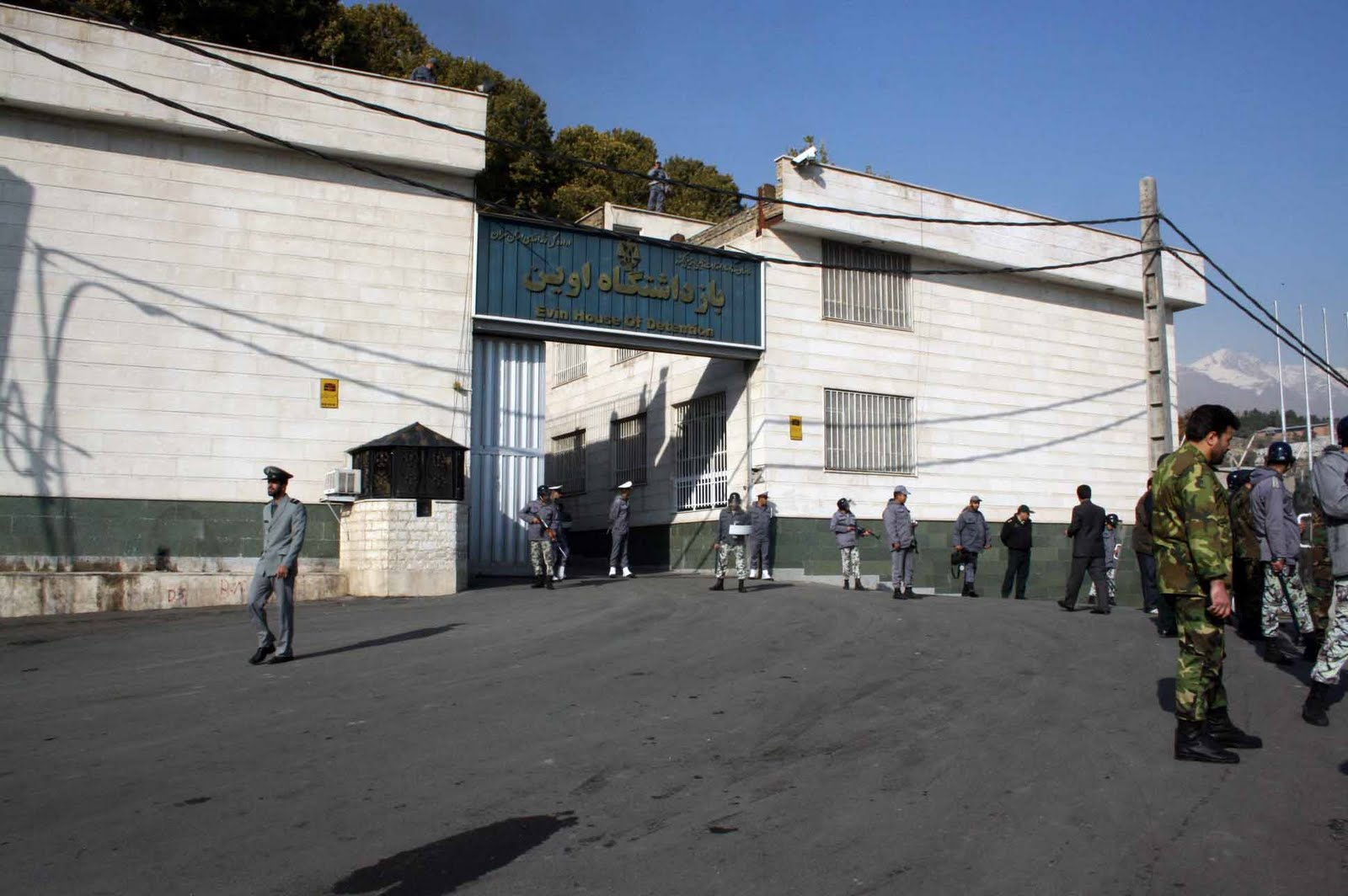
Evin Prison

Somewhere between 3000 and 30,000 political prisoners were executed between July and early September 1988 on orders of the Supreme Leader Ayatollah Ruhollah Khomeini. While the government attempted to keep the executions secret, by 2020 UN Special Rapporteurs had sent a letter to the IRI describing the killings as "crimes against humanity".

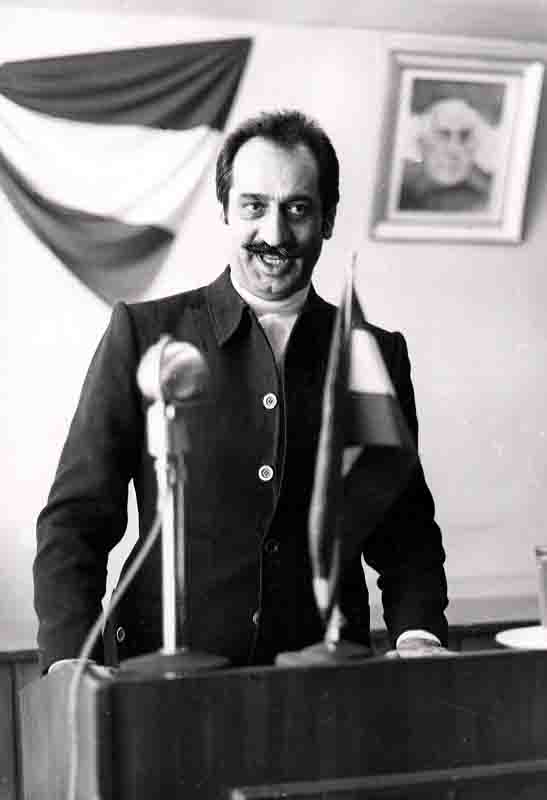
Dariush Forouhar, leader of Nation Party was one of the victims of Chain murders of Iran.

==== 1990s and the Chain Murders ====
In the 1990s there were a number of unsolved murders and disappearances of intellectuals and political activists who had been critical of the Islamic Republic system in some way. In 1998 these complaints came to a head with the killing of three dissident writers (Mohammad Jafar Pouyandeh, Mohammad Mokhtari, Majid Sharif), a political leader (Dariush Forouhar) and his wife in the span of two months, in what became known as the "Chain murders" or 1998 Serial Murders of Iran. Altogether more than 80 writers, translators, poets, political activists, and ordinary citizens are thought to have been killed over the course of several years.

While reformist journalists and media were able to uncover the murders, the man responsible for much of the exposing of the chain murders—Saeed Hajjarian, a Ministry of Intelligence operative-turned-journalist and reformer—came close to being murdered and ended up seriously crippled by a member of the Basij; and the deputy security official of the Ministry of Information, Saeed Emami blamed for the killings died in prison, allegedly committing suicide, though many believe he was killed and that "higher level officials were responsible for the killings".

With the rise of the Iranian reform movement and the election of moderate Iranian president Mohammad Khatami in 1997, numerous moves were made to modify the Iranian civil and penal codes in order to improve the human rights situation. The predominantly reformist parliament drafted several bills allowing increased freedom of speech, gender equality, and the banning of torture. These were all dismissed or significantly watered down by the Guardian Council and leading conservative figures in the Iranian government at the time.

==== Early 21st century and mass protests ====
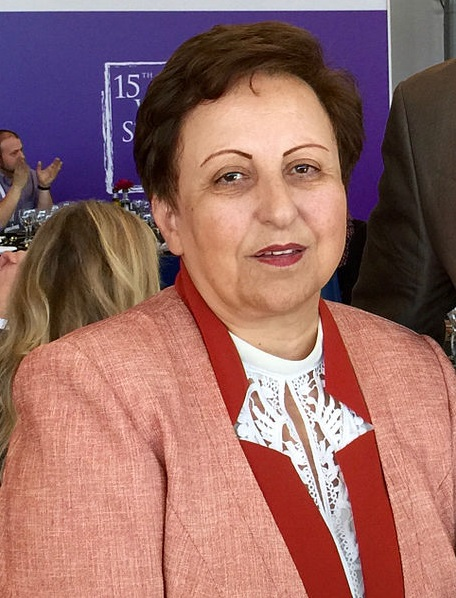
Shirin Ebadi, winner of 2003 Nobel Peace Prize

By 2007, The Economist magazine wrote:

The Tehran spring of ten years ago has now given way to a bleak political winter. The new government continues to close down newspapers, silence dissenting voices and ban or censor books and websites. The peaceful demonstrations and protests of the Khatami era are no longer tolerated: in January 2007 security forces attacked striking bus drivers in Tehran and arrested hundreds of them. In March police beat hundreds of men and women who had assembled to commemorate International Women's Day.

Several major recent protest movements – the July 1999 Iran student protests, 2009 Iranian presidential election protests, 2017–18 Iranian protests, 2019–2020 Iranian protests — have been met with violent crackdowns from the "parallel institution" of the Basij, with mass arrests, live ammunition, show trials. The November 2019 protests led to hundreds of civilian deaths and thousands of injuries, and a nationwide internet blackout by the government, "reported abuse and torture in detention", and the "greenlighting" of "these rampant abuses" by the Supreme Leader Ali Khamenei. Estimates of the killed vary from 200 to 1500.

From 2018 to 2020 human rights complaints included a high rate of executions, the targeting of "journalists, online media activists, and human rights defenders" by the "security apparatus and Iran's judiciary" in "blatant disregard of international and domestic legal standards", including "decades-long prison sentences" for human rights defenders, "excessive force ... arbitrary mass arrests and serious due process violations" in response to economic protests by the public.

===== 2022 Mahsa Amini protests =====
In September 2022 a new round of "nationwide" protest began that has "spread across social classes, universities, the streets [and] schools", and been called "the biggest threat" to the government of Iran since its founding with the Islamic Revolution. The unrest began with the Death of Mahsa Amini at the hands of Iranian morality Islamic police, after she was detained for allegedly wearing hijab incorrectly. At least 551 people have been killed as of 15 September 2023, according to Iran Human Rights, including women and at least 68 minors. An estimated 18,170 have been arrested throughout 134 cities and towns, and at 132 universities. In addition to Iran's domestic security forces, some reports have indicated that foreign militias aligned with the Islamic Revolutionary Guard Corps, such as groups from Lebanon, Iraq, and Afghanistan, were involved in the suppression of protests.

===== 2026 Iran massacres =====
Since late December 2025 Iranian state security forces have engaged in massacres of dissidents during the 2025–2026 Iranian protests. The crackdown was carried out under Ali Khamenei's direct order for live fire on protesters.

As of 13 January 2026, unofficial figures for death tolls had risen to 12,000 civilians. On Jan 8th, the country was faced with a surge of internet blackouts nationwide on an unprecedented scale, affecting human rights organisation's ability to attest to new figures, as well as cover the range of human rights violations that have occurred since the protests began. Some sources also estimate the actual number casualties to sit as high as 20,000.

==== 2026 Prison crisis ====
Human rights organizations and families of detainees have reported worsening conditions in Iranian prisons since the beginning of the recent war in Iran. Activists report increasing chaos within prisons, with non-political detainees being released but political prisoners, specifically those detained during protests, being denied bail.

Reports indicate that the administrative order in Evin prison has collapsed, with guards abandoning their posts leaving prisoners locked in their cells lacking food or medical care. Political prisoners have also been moved to unknown locations without notifying their families. Iran's special police unit, NOPO, is reported to have taken control of the prison.

Conditions are also worsening in other prisons. Dadban, a group of volunteer lawyers, reported deteriorating circumstances at Qarchak women's prison, including staff shortages, water shortages, and the closure of the prison shop. At Tehran Greater Prison, explosions damaged the facility, and reports indicate that prison guards beat inmates and fired tear gas. There have been similar incidents in other prisons, such as Mahabad, where anti-riot guards attacked prisoners protesting unsafe conditions during wartime.

Human rights groups also express concern over the rise in executions, particularly of those arrested during the 2026 protests. Amnesty International reports that at least 30 people connected to the protests, including minors, face the death penalty.

In May 2026, Iran human rights Monitor reported that protester Mohammad Abbasi was executed at Qezel Hesar prison after prison authorities denied his family a final visit despite previously summoning them for a farewell meeting. Iran Human Rights Monitor described the incident as "psychological torture" and claimed that Abbasi was tortured until he confessed to the charges of allegedly assault of an Iranian security officer during the 2026 protests. Abbasi's daughter was also sentenced to serve 25 years in Evin prison for joining her father at the protest.

==== 2026 Iran war ====
During the 2026 Iran war, Rahim Nadali, an IRGC official in Tehran, announced the launch of the initiative "For Iran" which recruits 12 year olds into the Basij militia for them to assist in manning "operational patrols" and checkpoints, as well as providing logistical support and performing other duties. This move contradicts Iran's commitment to abstain from the use of children in military activities under the Convention on the Rights of the Child. Nadali justified the move stating "Given that the age of those coming forward has dropped and they are asking to take part, we lowered the minimum age to 12". According to Al-Arabiya, from the beginning of the war, Tehran residents reported of untrained teenagers and youths armed with Uzi sub-machine guns and Kalshnikov rifles, stopping vehicles, shouting orders, and firing warning shots into the air.

According to reporting from The Guardian, in March 2026 Iran carried out a series of executions of political prisoners and protesters linked to the January 2026 protests, including the hanging of three men (Saleh Mohammadi, Mehdi Ghasemi, and Saeed Davoudi) charged with moharebeh ("waging war against God") and related offenses, and the execution of dual‑national Kourosh Keyvani on espionage charges. By early April, additional executions continued with cases such as Amirhossein Hatami being executed on 2 April 2026 for involvement in protests-related events.

According to Iran Human Rights Monitor, 146 people have been executed since the beginning of the war.

=== Perspective of the Islamic Republic ===
In 1984, Iran's representative to the United Nations, Sai Rajaie-Khorassani, declared the Universal Declaration of Human Rights to be representing a "secular understanding of the Judeo-Christian tradition", which did not "accord with the system of values recognized by the Islamic Republic of Iran" and whose provisions the IRI would "not hesitate to violate".

Officials of the Islamic Republic have responded to criticism by stating that Iran has "the best human rights record" in the Muslim world (2012); that it is not obliged to follow "the West's interpretation" of human rights (2008); and that the Islamic Republic is a victim of "biased propaganda of enemies" which is "part of a greater plan against the world of Islam" (2008).

While in 2004 reformist president Mohammad Khatami stated that Iran certainly has "people who are in prison for their ideas." In general Iranian officials have denied Iran has political prisoners (Judiciary chief Ayatollah Mahmoud Hashemi Shahroudi in 2004), or claimed that Iran's human rights record is better than that of countries that criticize it (President Mahmoud Ahmadinejad in 2007 and 2008), or better than Israel's.

=== Relative openness ===
One observation made by some non-governmental individuals about the state of human rights in the Islamic Republic is that it is not so severe that the Iranian public is afraid to criticize its government publicly to strangers. While in neighboring Syria (circa 2005) "taxi driver[s] rarely talk politics; the Iranian[s] will talk of nothing else."

Explanations for why this is include the importance of "debate and discussion" among clerics in Shiite Islam that has spilled over into the Iranian public (journalist Elaine Sciolino), and that "notions of democracy and human rights" now have much deeper roots among Iranians than under the Shah (Akbar Ganji, Arzoo Osanloo, Hooman Majd), in fact are "almost hegemonic" (Arzoo Osanloo), so that it is much harder to spread fear among them, even to the point that if Iranian intelligence services "were to arrest anyone who speaks ill of the government in private, they simply couldn't build cells fast enough to hold their prisoners" (journalist Hooman Majd).

=== Comparison ===
The Islamic revolution is thought to have a significantly worse human rights record than the Pahlavi dynasty it overthrew. According to political historian Ervand Abrahamian, "whereas less than 100 political prisoners had been executed between 1971 and 1979, more than 7900 were executed between 1981 and 1985. ... the prison system was centralized and drastically expanded ... Prison life was drastically worse under the Islamic Republic than under the Pahlavis. One who survived both writes that four months under [Islamic Republic warden] Ladjevardi took the toll of four years under SAVAK. In the prison literature of the Pahlavi era, the recurring words had been ‘boredom’ and ‘monotony’. In that of the Islamic Republic, they were ‘fear’, ‘death’, ‘terror’, ‘horror’, and most frequent of all ‘nightmare’ (‘kabos’)."

UN reports indicate an increase in executions in Iran in 2024 compared to 2023. A total of 901 people were executed during the year, including 40 individuals within a single week.

According to the Norwegian-based Iran Human Rights (IHR) group, the number of executions in 2025 was more than double the number in 2024. The 2026 Amnesty report revealed that during 2025 at least 2,159 executions took place in Iran, which make about 80% of executions worldwide.

=== Human rights bodies and sources of information ===
Since the founding of the Islamic Republic, human rights violations have been the subject of resolutions and decisions by the United Nations and its human rights bodies, and by the Council of Europe, European Parliament and United States Congress. In early 1980 Iran became one of the few countries (where conditions were bad enough) to ever be investigated by a UN country rapporteur under the UN Special Procedures section. Four years later the United Nations Commission on Human Rights appointed a Special Representative on Iran to study its human rights situation and as of 2001 three men have filled that role. In addition to the UN Commission, more information on human rights violations has been provided by Human Rights NGOs and memoires by political prisoners who were released and which became available in the 1990s. According to The Minority Rights Group, in 1985 Iran became "the fourth country ever in the history of the United Nations" to be placed on the agenda of the General Assembly because of "the severity and the extent of this human rights record".

In response, not only has the Islamic Republic not implement recommendations to improve conditions (according to the UNCHR), but it has retaliated "against witnesses who testified to the experts." The United Nations Commission on Human Rights (UNCHR) has repeatedly passed resolutions criticizing human rights violations against Iran's religious minorities – especially the Baháʼís – as well as the Islamic Republic's "instances of torture, stoning as a method of execution and punishment such as flogging and amputations", and the situation of a hunger striker (Farhad Meysami).

In addition, non-governmental human rights groups such as Human Rights Watch, Amnesty International, the Center for Human Rights in Iran, have issued reports and expressed concern over issues such as the treatment of religious minorities, prison conditions, medical conditions of prisoners, deaths of prisoners (Vahid Sayadi Nasiri), mass arrests of anti-government demonstrators. Iran has a track record of treating Afghan refugees and migrants poorly, with Human Rights Watch documenting violations including physical abuse, detention in unsanitary and inhumane conditions, forced payment for transportation and accommodation in deportation camps, forced labor, and forced separation of families.

== See also ==
- High Council for Human rights, Judiciary of Islamic Republic of Iran
- Cairo Declaration on Human Rights in Islam
- Freedom of speech in Iran
- LGBT rights in Iran
- Status of religious freedom in Iran
- Women's rights in Iran
- Human rights in the Islamic Republic of Iran
- Mehraveh Khandan
- List of human rights organisations § Iran
- Prison rape § Iran
