= Children's rights in Mali =

Human rights of children in Mali

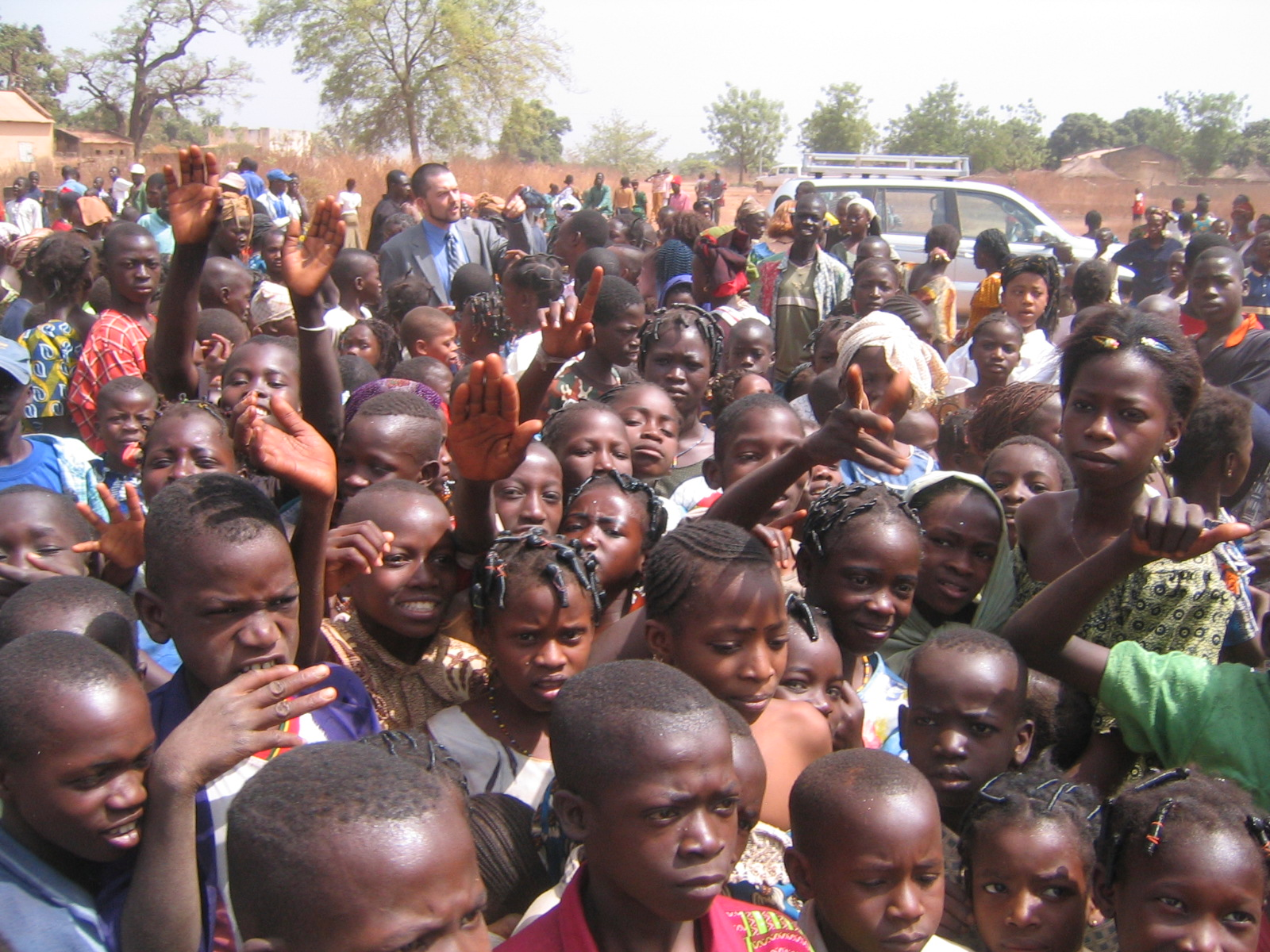
Children gathered in the town of Yanfolila.

Children's rights in Mali are secured by several laws designed to protect children and provide for their welfare, including an ordinance that provides for regional positions as "child delegates" to safeguard the rights and interests of children. However, as with most legal issues, this is the official account, based on laws that have only a status on paper. There are no provisions for the execution of the laws, and as any visit to any medium-sized town in Mali will show, there are scores of children in the street who live on the verge of starvation and who are often maltreated. Especially the talibe, young boys 'given' to a 'marabout', are subject to all sorts of negligence if not inhuman treatment by their masters. Such 'marabouts' are also in practice above the law—in spite of widespread maltreatment of children by them not a single complaint against them has been made. There is a serious problem here, because hardly any research in this area has been carried out. However, a qualitative study by Jelle Hilven, of the Free University of Brussels, revealed acute deviations from official politics in daily life.

== Background ==
For many years education in Mali was tuition free and, in principle, open to all; however, students were required to provide their own uniforms and supplies. Primary school was compulsory up to the age of 12, but only 56.6 percent of children from seven to 12 years old (49.3 percent of girls and 64.1 percent of boys) attended primary school during the 2005–6 school year. Girls' enrollment in school was lower than boys' at all levels due to poverty, cultural tendencies to emphasize boys' education, and early marriages for girls. Other factors affecting school enrollment included distance to the nearest school, lack of transportation, and shortages of teachers and instructional materials. Members of the black Tamachek, or Bellah, community reported that some Tamachek children were denied educational opportunities because their traditional masters would not allow them to attend school.

Approximately 11 percent of students attended private Arabic-language schools, or medersas (from Arabic: مدرسة)." Medersas were encouraged to follow the government curriculum, and most taught core subjects including math, science, and foreign languages; however, few medersas fully adhered to the government's curriculum due to a lack of teacher training and instructional materials. An unknown number of primary school-aged children throughout the country attended part-time Koranic schools. Most Koranic school students were under the age of 10. Koranic schools taught only the Koran and were partially funded by students, known as "garibouts," who were required by schoolmasters to beg for money on the streets as part of their religious instruction. A 2005 UNICEF study of Koranic schools in Mopti found that children who attended these schools spent the majority of their time begging on the streets or working in fields. The government provided subsidized medical care to children as well as adults, but the care was limited in quality and availability. Boys and girls had equal access to medical care.

Statistics on child abuse were unreliable, and reported cases of abuse were rare, according to local human rights organizations. The social services department investigated and intervened in cases of child abuse or neglect. As one of the few pieces of empirical research carried out, Hilven (2011) reports widespread neglect and deep fear to report maltreatment, both by the local population as by non-Malian residents and organisations.

A 2004 governmental study, which involved 450 interviews, found that the children most at risk for sexual exploitation were girls between the ages of 12 and 18 who worked as street vendors or domestic servants, or who were homeless children or the victims of child trafficking. Such exploitation was most prevalent in areas in which the population and economy were in flux, such as border zones or towns on transportation routes or in mining areas. The study noted that most cases of sexual exploitation went unreported and recommended that the country strengthen its laws to protect children.

Female genital mutilation, or FGM, was common, particularly in rural areas, and was performed on girls between the ages of six months to six years. According to domestic NGOs, approximately 95 percent of adult women had undergone FGM. The practice was widespread in most regions and among most ethnic groups, was not subject to class boundaries, and was not religiously based. There are no laws against FGM, but a government decree prohibits FGM in government-funded health centers. The government continued its two-phase plan to eliminate FGM by 2008. According to the local human rights organizations fighting FGM, the educational phase (workshops, videos, and theater) continued in cities, and FGM reportedly decreased substantially among children of educated parents. In many instances, FGM practitioners agreed to stop the practice in exchange for other income-generating activity. The National Committee Against Violence Towards Women linked all the NGOs combating FGM.

Women may legally marry at age 18 and men at age 21. The marriage code allows girls under age 15 to marry with parental consent or special permission from a judge. Women's rights organizations opposed this provision as contradicting international conventions that protect children through the age of 18. Underage marriage was a problem throughout the country with parents in some cases arranging marriages for girls as young as nine. A local NGO reported that at least 10 girls-—some below the age of 13—-lost their lives between 2005 and May 2007 because of medical complications resulting from early marriage. Medical specialists noted that child brides were often the victims of FGM, which exacerbates the possibility of complications from infection and childbirth.

== Movement ==
Local women's rights NGOs, such as Action for the Promotion and Development of Women, the Committee for the Defense of Women's Rights, and the Women's and Children's Rights Watch, educated local populations about the negative consequences of underage marriage. The government also helped to enable girls married at an early age to continue in school.

== See also ==
- Children's rights
- List of children's rights topics
