= International Law Concerning Child Civilians in Armed Conflict =

- Author: Jenny Kuper
- Subject: Children's rights; law of war
- Published: 1997
- Publisher: Clarendon Press
- Pages: 320
- ISBN: 9780198264866

International Law Concerning Child Civilians in Armed Conflict is a book by the legal scholar Jenny Kuper, published under the Clarendon Press imprint, described by Oxford University Press as being "for Oxford publications of particular academic importance". It is well cited within its field, and is included on reading lists for related courses of study at multiple universities, making it a notable work.

It examines the concept of childhood, and the specific legal position of child civilians in armed conflict.
