= Execution of Amirhossein Hatami =

Iranian protestor (2007–2026)

Amirhossein Hatami
- Born: 2007
- Died: April 2, 2026 (aged 18)
- Cause of death: Execution by hanging

On 2 April 2026, 18-year-old Iranian teenager Amirhossein Hatami (امیرحسین حاتمی; born 2007) was executed by hanging by the Islamic Republic of Iran. He had been arrested 84 days prior, during the 2025–2026 Iranian protests for allegedly setting a Basij base on fire. The case drew widespread condemnation from international human rights organizations.

== Arrest, trial, and execution ==
Hatami was arrested on 8 January 2026. He and six other were charged with attacking a facility belonging to the Basij militia.

Following his arrest, Hatami didn’t have enough money for a lawyer of his own choosing and was instead assigned "court appointed counsel". Ten days after his arrest, on 18 January 2026, state media broadcast confessions by five of the defendants.

The trial was held on 7 February 2026 in Branch 15 of the Revolutionary Court in Tehran, presided over by Judge Abolqasem Salavati ("Judge of Death") who has been subject to United States sanctions since 2019 for his alleged frequent imposition of death sentences. The court sentenced all seven defendants to death on charges of "moharebeh" (enmity against God).

On 31 March 2026, Hatami and four other prisoners were transferred to the solitary confinement ward of Qezelhesar Prison. Amirhossein Hatami was executed on 2 April 2026.

As of April 17, 2026, Iranian security forces continue to withhold Hatami's body four days after his execution, reportedly to pressure his grieving family.

== Reactions ==
Amnesty International expressed outrage at what it described as "the arbitrary execution of a teenage protester" calling his trial "grossly unfair". The organization added that "while the population faces mass casualties from bombardment, the authorities continue to weaponize the death penalty to silence dissent."
