= Poverty in Colombia =

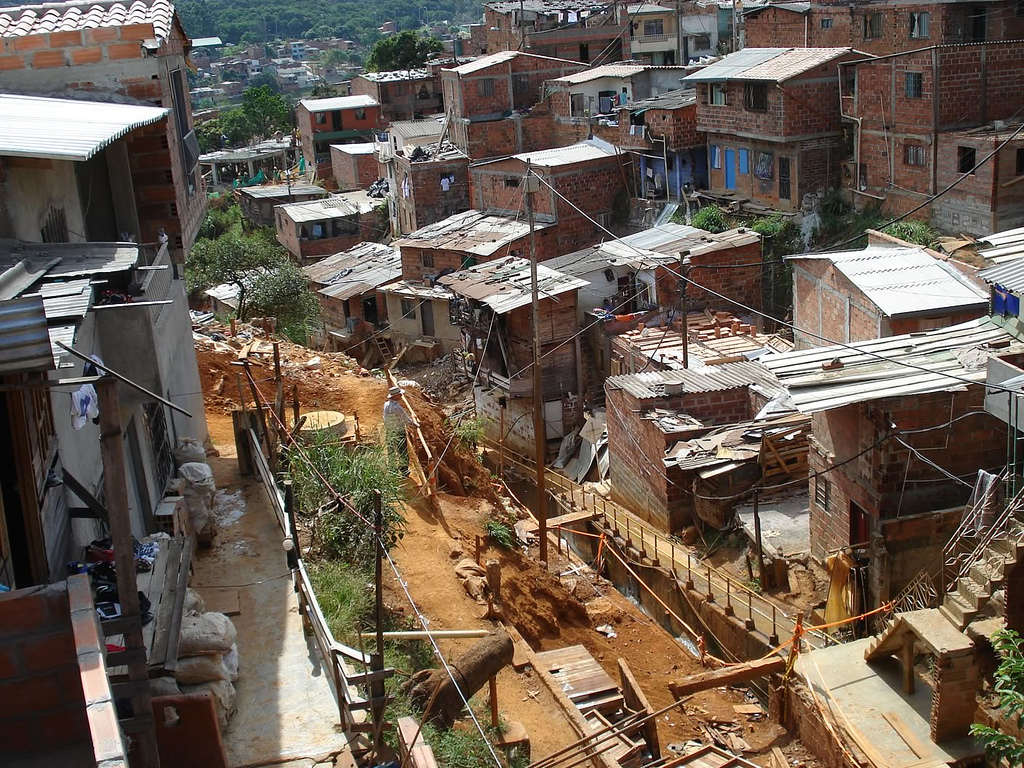
Informal brick housing.

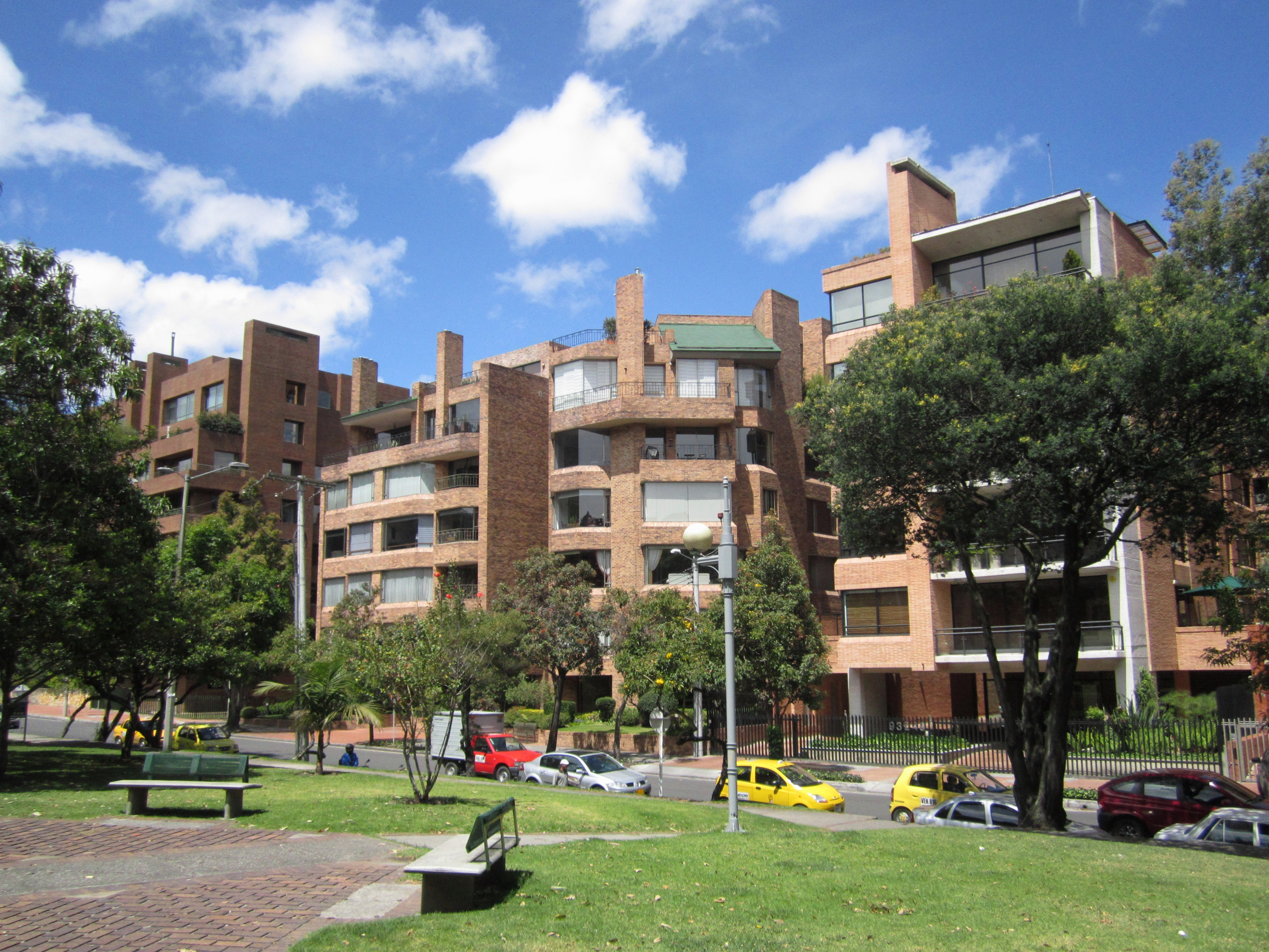
District with excellent public services

== Poverty statistics ==
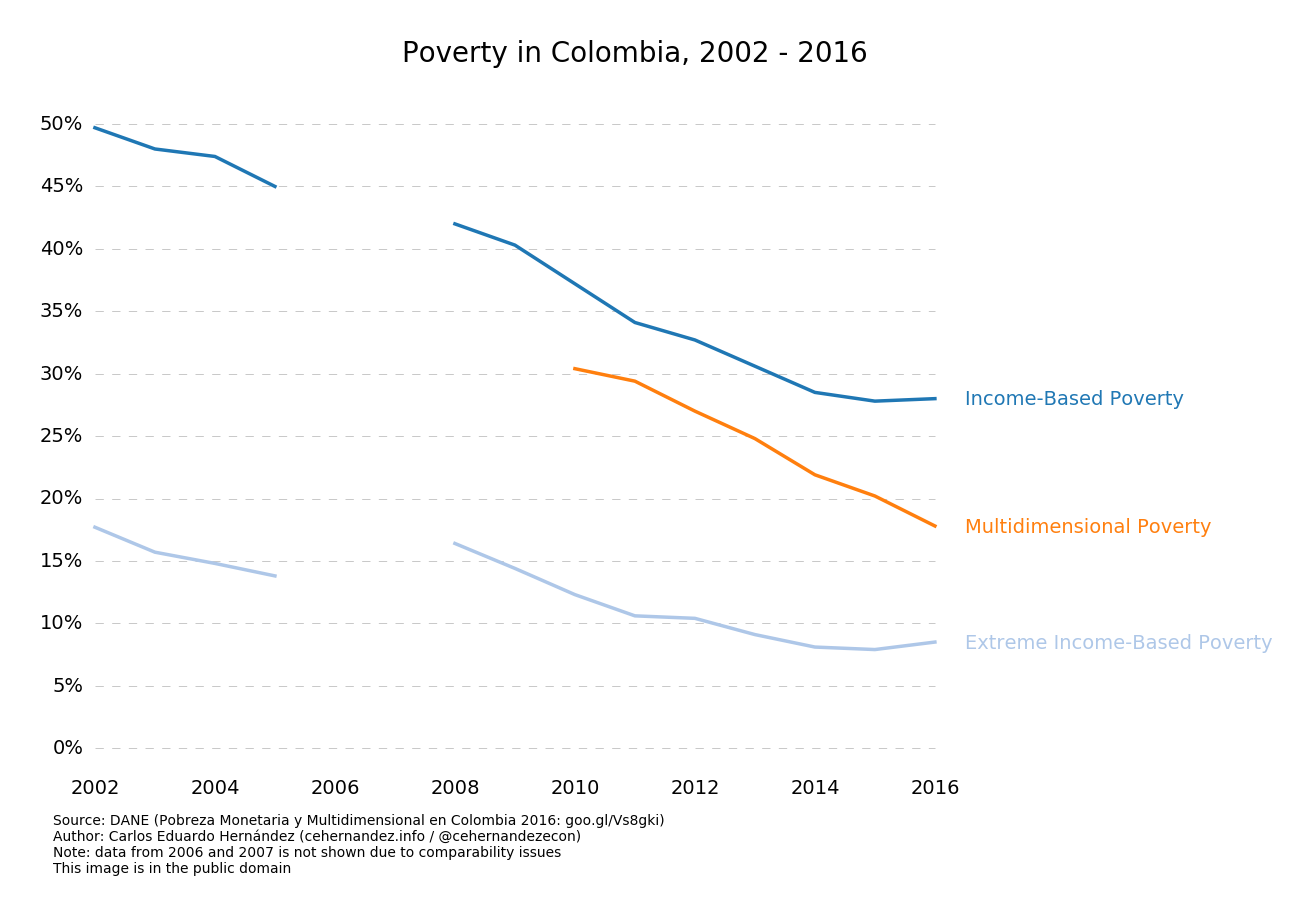
Colombian poverty rates, 2002–2016.Income-Based Poverty, Extreme Income-Based Poverty, and Multidimensional Poverty

In 2017, the National Administrative Department of Statistics (DANE) reported that 26.9% of the population were living below the poverty line, of which 7.4% in "extreme poverty". The multidimensional poverty rate stands at 17.0% of the population.

=== Unemployment ===
The average national unemployment rate in 2017 was 9.4%, although the informality is the biggest problem facing the labour market (the income of formal workers climbed 24.8% in 5 years while labor incomes of informal workers rose only 9%).

=== Inequality ===
According to the World Bank, Colombia's Gini coefficient (a measurement of inequality in wealth distribution) was 0.587 in 2000 and 0.535 in 2013, ranking alongside Chile, Panama, Brazil and Honduras as the most unequal Latin American countries in terms of wealth distribution.

== Related issues ==
=== Literacy ===
In 2015, a total of 94.58% of the population aged 15 and older were recorded as literate, including 98.53% of those aged 15–24.

=== Malnutrition ===
In 2010, 3.4% of the children under 5 years old in Colombia suffer from global malnutrition (deficiency of weight for age) and up to 13% suffer from chronic malnutrition (deficiency of height for age). The situation is worse for the indigenous peoples of Colombia, who in the same indicators recorded rates of 7.5% and 29.5% respectively.

== Social strata in Colombia ==
Colombia's social strata have been divided as follows and have been extensively used by the government as a reference to develop social welfare programs, statistical information and to some degree for the assignment of lands.

Stratum 1	The system is the classification of the residential properties that should receive public services. The system does not consider the income per person.
Stratum 2	The system is the classification of the residential properties that should receive public services. The system does not consider the income per person.
Stratum 3	The system is the classification of the residential properties that should receive public services. The system does not consider the income per person.
Stratum 4	The system is the classification of the residential properties that should receive public services. The system does not consider the income per person.
Stratum 5	The system is the classification of the residential properties that should receive public services. The system does not consider the income per person.
Stratum 6	The system is the classification of the residential properties that should receive public services. The system does not consider the income per person.

The system is the classification of the residential properties that should receive public services. Although the system does not consider the income per person and the rules say that the residential real estate should stratify and not households. All mayors should do the stratification of residential properties of their municipality or district.

In 1994, this stratification policy was made into law in order to grant subsidies to the poorest residents. The system is organized so that the people living in upper layers (strata 5 and 6) pay more for services like electricity, water and sewage than the groups in the lower strata. Critics of the system say that it impedes social mobility through stigmatization, while its proponents argue that it allows the poor to locate to areas where they will be able to access subsidized services. There are many studies that have shown that the socio-economic stratum is a bad instrument to allocate subsidies. In particular, these studies show that there is a high percentage of households of strata 1 and 2 which have a level of consumption similar to the households of strata 5 and 6 (18% of households in stratum 1, 36% of households in 2 and 66% of households in stratum 3 are located in quintiles 4 and 5 of the distribution of consumption. 98% of households in stratum 6 is in these quintiles).

Although nowadays there are more reliable sources to determine capacity to pay.

- The first is the tax information, where each inhabitant income are reported. In the current model, there are people who live in areas with low strata but who receive high income.
- The second proposal are the surveys related to the policy of subsidies, such as the SISBEN; a strategy that works through home visits, who value the ability to pay of the inhabitants.

== See also ==
- Poverty by country
- Social class in Colombia
