= Middle class in Colombia =

The Colombian middle class is a social class in Colombia, it is a broadly used term. There are many definitions. Middle class also has subcategories, such as upper middle class and lower middle and it can contain a very large number of individuals with vastly different professions and ways of living. Middle class and the overall standards of living are affected by the economy of a country, one which has a growing economy and positive economic indicators, will be more likely to have a larger middle class with decent standards of living and less inequality. Colombia is a country that has been experiencing a significantly fast economic growth, which has impacted the income, wealth and expenditure of its population, and the proportion of its population belonging to middle class.

In 1993, the population in the lower class in Latin America (earning less than US$4 a day) was 2.5 times the population in the middle class (earning US$4 to US$50). Ten years later, this two subgroups had approximately the same number of individuals

== Definition ==
Social classes are a way of categorising individuals according to different factors, mainly based in income and wealth. There are many ways in which middle class can be defined. A global middle class can be defined as the one that has a purchasing power parity per capita of US$10 to US$50 per day per household. Additionally, middle class emphasises on the values of hard work and education, two elements which are necessary to achieve a sustainable economic growth. It is expected a growth for the middle class by 5.3% in number of individuals and by 4.6% in purchasing power (real) between 2010 and 2020.

In Colombia the numbers are different. A household can be considered middle class if it earns between US$300 and US$850 per month, which is US$10 and US$29 per day. Any household earning anything more that this is considered high class and will be located on the top 10% of the richest in Colombia.

Another important aspect when defining middle class is economic security. Economic security is a low probability of falling in poverty. The concept of economic security is vital in the definition of middle class as it implies having economic stability and the capacity to overcome unfortunate economic situations. A probability of falling back to poverty of 10% in 5 years is the maximum economic insecurity level that a middle class household could reasonably tolerate. A level higher than this would place the household in the lower class.

=== Colombian government approach ===
The government of Colombia bases its social stratification on the housing of the population, not on other factors such as income or overall wealth. This system has scores from 0 to 6, being 0 the lowest and 6 the highest. It bases the results on the physical conditions of the residence. Middle class individuals are those who live in a dwelling in the range of 3–4. This system is used to manage public investment, identify which areas have higher needs, as well as to estimate tax costs.

Citizens on the higher social stratum pay more for utilities and taxes, this helps the lower stratum individuals pay less on utilities and taxes, it is a way of subsidising their costs.

== Sub divisions ==
Middle class is still a broad group that can contain many individuals, with differences in their income. This creates subcategories, upper middle class and lower middle class are the main ones.

=== Upper middle class ===
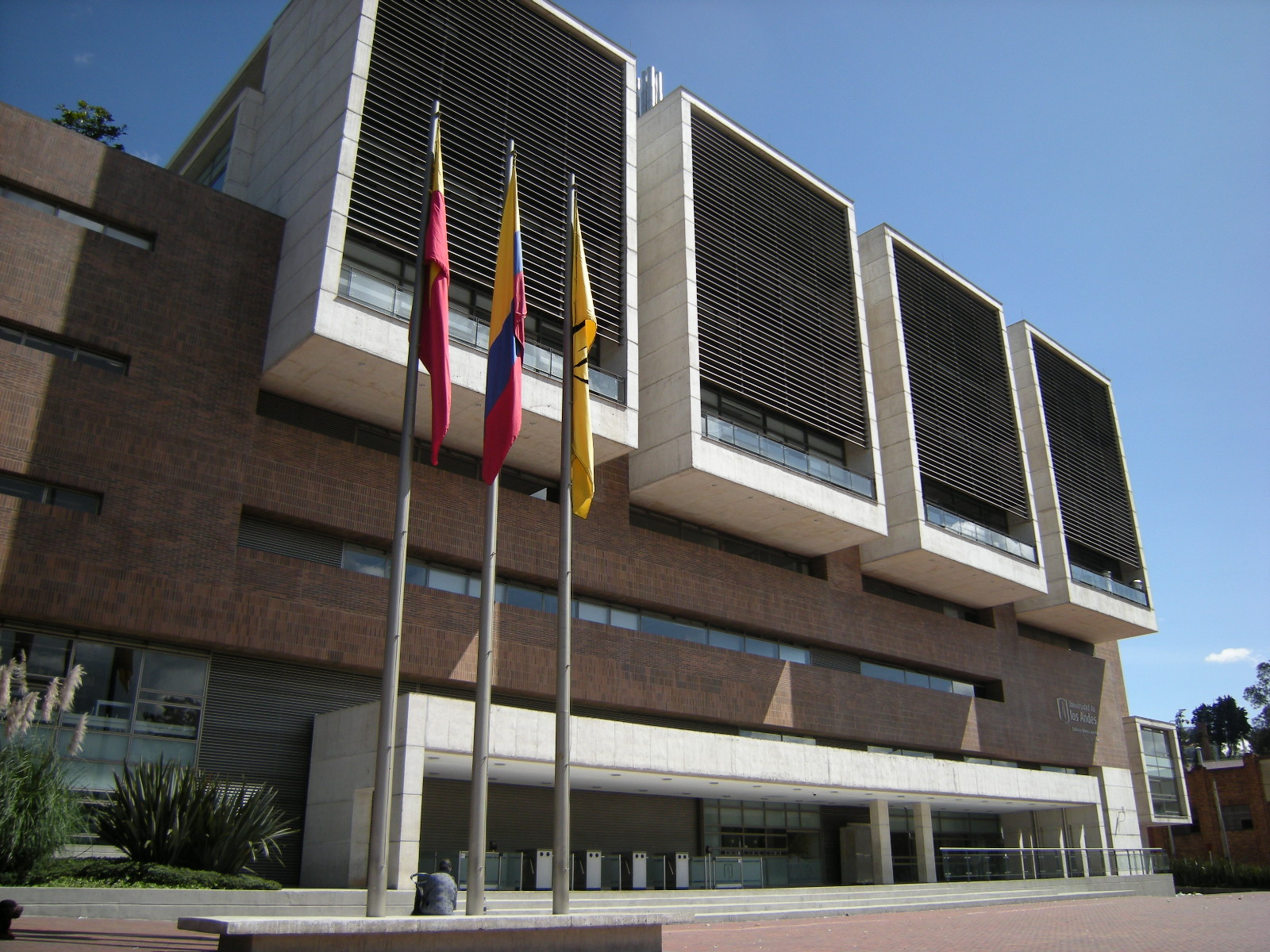
Universidad de Los Andes

Upper middle class has access to more education. Generally, the higher the social class, the more education the individuals receive. This affects the social class mobility as more education means an increase in economic security. Upper middle class has access to better educational institutions, such as the Andes University and the Colombian National University. Upper-middle-class families also have higher access to credit and to property markets. It is also characterised for having a higher economic security and lower chances of falling into poverty. In Colombia, upper middle class does not receive economic help from the government.

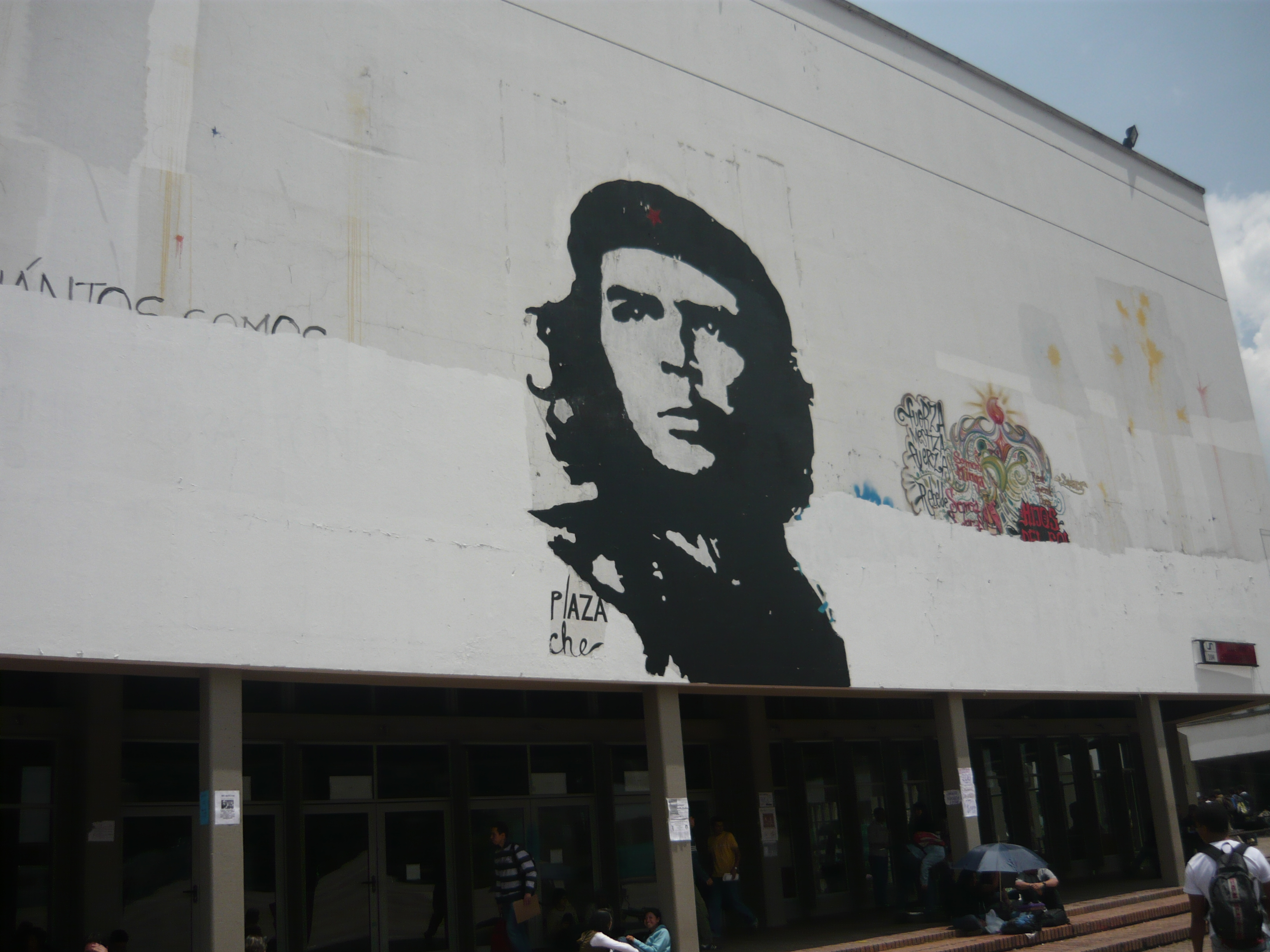
National University of Colombia

=== Lower middle class ===
This group has an income between US$4 and US$10. This group has lower economic security and higher chances to fall back into poverty. Lower middle class does not have the same educational opportunities as the upper middle class, as they don't have the resources to pay for the tuition costs from prestigious universities. Due to this, and to minimise the inequality and maximise the access to education, the government has had several initiatives where the education for the lower classes is subsidised, so the best students from the lower classes do not have to pay for their education.

A common occurrence in lower-middle-class families is that the money received from their employment is enough to cover all basic necessities but there is not much money remaining for unnecessary wants or luxury goods. Lower-middle-class families have financial limitations. This subsection relies on their employment to survive, there is low margin for savings and losing their employment would cause them to make changes in their lifestyle and would increase the probability of falling back to poverty.

Lower middle class also has a higher proportion in manufacturing jobs, and receives some help from the government to cover certain expenses.

== Occupations ==
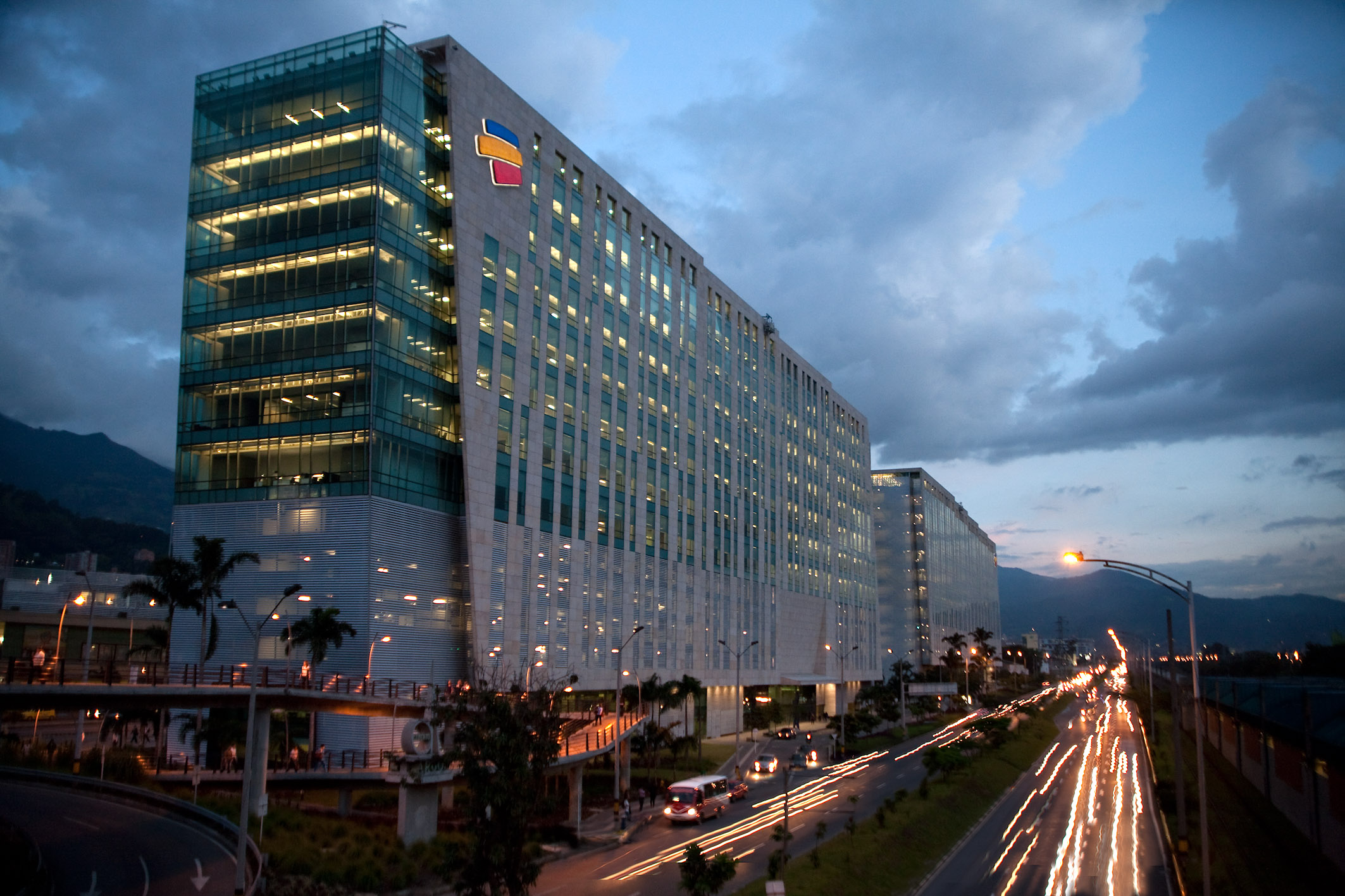
Bancolombia office building

Middle class has varied occupations. Most likely middle class individuals are formal employees, rather than self employed, unemployed or employer. Lower class individuals rely more on self employment or suffer from unemployment, and high class individuals are mostly employers or self employed.

In terms of economic sectors, middle class employees commonly work in the services industry, among those are health, education and public services. Manufacturing employment is also more common in middle class than in any other class.

Middle class employees are frequently formally educated, employed by a private company with a formal contract, which gives the individual rights to social benefits.

Some employees from the lower middle class are not formal employees, these subset is the one with the lowest reported earnings from the whole set of middle class employees.

== Middle class in the region ==
There are many similarities as well as many differences in the matter of middle class in Latin America and the Caribbean. The first common factor in the region is education, the head of a middle-class family had significantly more education years than the head of a lower-class family. Additionally, throughout the region, middle-class families tend to live in urban areas, at a higher rate than lower classes. Most of the countries had similarities in the employment sector, most middle class workers are not in the public sector (except Mexico and Peru). There is only one country in which the public sector employs more than a quarter of the population, Honduras.

In the region, middle class individuals have many similarities. A middle class person from any country will have more similarities with a middle class person from another country from the region, rather than with a lower class person from its same country. But when values and aspirations are included, this middle class person will have more in common with a lower class person from its own country than with a middle class person from another country.

== Changes in middle class ==
=== Mobility ===
Social mobility refers to the ability for individuals to move between social classes. Mobility in Latin American and Colombia has been increasing in the previous years. 43% of the whole population changed social classes between the beginning of 1990 and the end of the 2000s. Most of this movement was upwards, it was a change from a lower to a higher social class, only 2% of the population suffered a downwards movement. One factor that significantly affected mobility was the years of schooling of the head of the family, there was a strong positive relation between the years of schooling and the mobility. Other factors that affect mobility are GDP growth, government spending in health and education services and transfer payments.

Changes in income signify an increase in mobility.

Mobility is also related to politics and standards of living, if an individual lived in a society with a higher mobility, the oppression and injustice would be less tolerable, not more.

There is low mobility in terms of income, despite the increase in mobility, the result generated by this change is still very low compared to world standards. This low mobility is accompanied by a high inequality in the region. There is an identified relation between these two factors, the higher the income inequality in a region, the lower the mobility is going to be.

Other factors like parents' income, education and background still affect mobility. More specifically, intergenerational mobility, which is the ability to move social classes related to the conditions of the parents.

== Current middle class ==
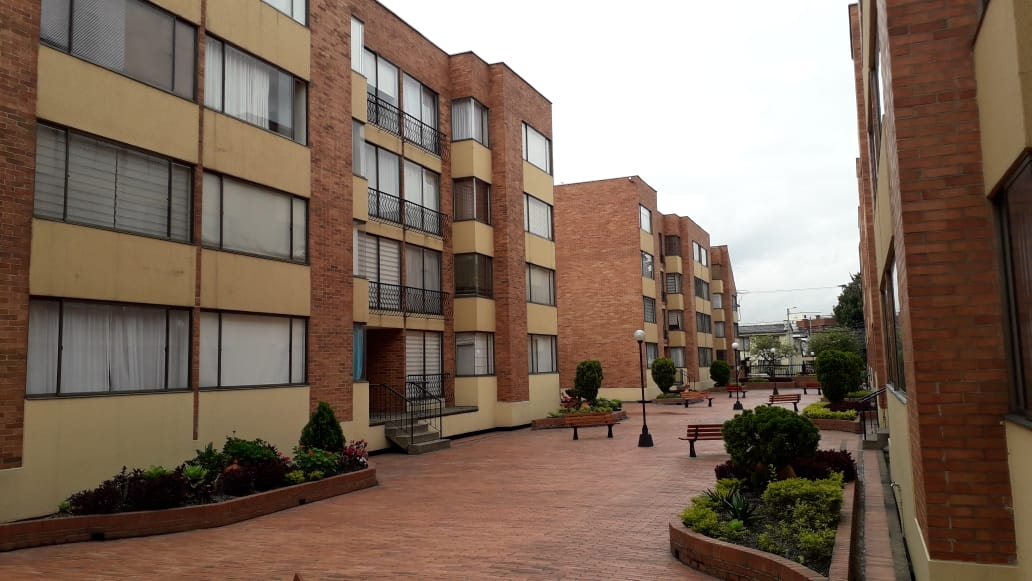
Stratum 4 residential building

According to a report from the world bank, middle class has grown by 50% in Latin America, from the years 2003 to 2009.

=== Living ===
From a family point of view, middle class has some similar characteristics, between 1992 and 2009, the average size of a middle-class family decreased from 3.3 to 2.9 individuals. Another factor that middle-class families have in common is the employment of the mother, 73% of women in middle-class families are employed or actively seeking employment, compared to 62% of the total population. The decrease in the number of children per household is also an important factor which is increasing the population in the middle class, women can also access the labour market and having no children increases the investment and purchasing capacity.

Debt is also a common factor in the middle class, many of the purchases including property, vehicles, travel and study are often financed through debt.

== Economic factors ==
=== Economic indicators ===
Colombia's market had a steady growth, except for 1999, where the country suffered a recession, from there, it has had an impressive market growth, around 6.9%, one of the highest growth rates in Latin America. Unemployment rate was 9.4% in 2017, external debt equals to 39.9% of GDP, and annual inflation in 2017 closed at 4.09% YoY.

=== Inequality ===
Latin America is the world's most unequal region, the income per capita of the richest 10% is 24 times that of the poorest 30%, This inequality can be explained by diverse reasons, the first one being education, the richest minority in Colombia has more access to education than the lower classes, in average the top 10% receives 13 years of education while the bottom 30% only receives 5 years.

==== Gini Index ====
Gini Index is a measure of inequality in a country, A coefficient of 0 indicates a perfect equality, meaning that all the wealth is perfectly spread among the population, and a coefficient of 1 means that the wealth is concentrated only in one individual. Colombia has a Gini index of 49.7 (2017), even though it has been on a decreasing trend, it is still one of the highest in the world [12th Position globally,] The decreasing trend on the Gini coefficient means that the distribution of income is becoming more even, and it is in accordance to the increase in middle class in Colombia.
