= Children's rights in Iran =

Human rights of children in Iran

The Islamic Republic of Iran signed the UN Convention on the Rights of the Child (CRC) in 1991 and ratified it in 1994. Iran made the following reservation to its ratification: "If the text of the Convention is or becomes incompatible with the domestic laws and Islamic standards at any time or in any case, the Government of the Islamic Republic shall not abide by it."

Although Iran is bound by the Convention under international law, international human rights organizations and foreign governments have routinely criticized it for failing to uphold its obligations under the treaty.

== History ==
The General Assembly of the League of Nations, of which Iran was a founding member, endorsed the Declaration of the Rights of the Child on 26 November 1924. In 1959 the United Nations General Assembly adopted the Declaration of the Rights of the Child without a vote.

Iran signed the Convention on the Rights of the Child on 5 September 1991. The Iranian Majlis ratified the treaty on 13 July 1994. In addition, Iran has signed and ratified the Optional Protocol on the Sale of Children, Child Prostitution and Child Pornography and has signed (but not ratified) the Optional Protocol on the Involvement of Children in Armed Conflict. Iran has yet to sign the Optional Protocol to the Convention on the Rights of the Child on a Communications Procedure.

In 2016, Iran submitted its combined Third and Fourth periodic report on the implementation of the provisions of the CRC.

=== Implementation ===
On 3 January 2010, Iran established the National Body for the Convention on the Rights of the Child (NBCRC) under the Ministry of Justice. The NBCRC is responsible for supervising, organizing, and coordinating all issues related to children in Iran, at a national level through ministries and NGOs, and at a local level through the establishment of local offices managed by provincial governors. The NBCRC has established four specialized working groups to fulfill its mandates: the Monitoring and Controlling Group, the Legal and Judicial Working Group, the Training and Information Working Group, and the Protection and Coordination Working Group.

While its establishment was considered a positive step, the effectiveness of the NBCRC has been called into question by outside groups. In particular, its lack of independence and its limited powers to influence government policy outside of an advisory capacity has been raised. There is currently no National Human Rights Institution (NHRI) in Iran with the power to consider individual complaints and carry out investigations on behalf of children.

== Legal status of children in Iran ==
Although the Islamic Republic of Iran has ratified the CRC, the law in Iran operates and gains legitimation only within an Islamic framework, which implies that any law has to conform to certain "Islamic criteria". The Islamic Republic of Iran has been urged multiple times by the United Nations Committee on the rights of the child to withdraw its reservation to the Convention, according to the CRC, which states that "A reservation incompatible with the object and purpose of the present Convention shall not be permitted." As a consequence, children are subject to the arbitrary way in which "Islamic criteria" are interpreted by State Authorities, namely the Parliament (Majlis), the Supreme Leader and The Guardian Council.

It is possible for individual children to bring to court cases of abuse experienced by them. However, this does not apply to criminal cases. Children under the age of fifteen usually need to present their case in court through their guardian. According to the Civil Code of the Islamic Republic of Iran, "The protection of the person who is under guardianship as well as his legal representation in all matters relating to his property and financial rights, are entrusted to the guardian." This makes providing justice for children very unlikely when the perpetrator of violence is the guardian, usually the mother. The Iranian Law does not regard the child as an entity with their rights and legal recognition, and therefore does not respect the General Comment No.12 (2009) within the CRC regarding the child's right to be heard.

In 2013, more than 2,400 child abductions were reported to the Association for the Protection of the Rights of the Child in Iran. The Children's Rights Advocacy Association, which manages the telephone counseling line, (Sedayeh Yara) says 55 percent of the children have been subjected to psychological and emotional punishment and 45 percent are subject to physical punishment. According to the statistics by Shirin Sadr Nuri, a member of the Association for the Protection of Children's Rights, citing to ISNA news agency, 93% of those who contacted the association in 2013, were the mothers of the children, and three percent were the children themselves. Two percent of calls were from their fathers.

== Children in the justice system ==
=== Age of criminal responsibility ===
With regard to the definition of "child", the tendency within international law is that of setting the threshold between childhood and adulthood at eighteen years old. For instance, the Committee on the Rights of the Child has claimed that individuals should not be subject to imprisonment under the age of 18 and should not be actively participating in conflicts under the age of 15. The age of criminal responsibility is directly connected to the age of majority. On 10 February 2012, Iran's parliament changed the controversial law of executing juveniles. In the new law, the age of 18 (solar year) would be considered the minimum age for adulthood and offenders under this age will be sentenced under a separate law.

=== Corporal punishment ===
Corporal punishment of children is not allowed in daycare centers according to article 8 (23) of the Amended Regulations for Establishment, Management, and Dissolution of All Forms of Day Care Centres (2008). The same law applies to juvenile correction centers. In fact, according to the Executive Regulations of the Prisons Organisation, Correction and Security Measures (2005), "Aggressive behavior, verbal abuse of the accused and convicts or administering harsh and insulting disciplinary measures are forbidden in any manner in institutions and prisons".

According to the Iranian Constitution, "all forms of torture for the purpose of extracting confession or acquiring information are forbidden", which conforms to the International Covenant on Civil and Political Rights. However, there have been recent reports of torture and mistreatment by juvenile offenders, who were forced to confess by means of physical coercion. One of the latest cases was reported by Alireza Tajiki, who was arrested at the age of fifteen and convicted after confessing under torture the rape and the murder of a friend, crimes that he consistently withdrew in court.

Flogging as a criminal punishment is still in use in the Justice system of the Islamic Republic of Iran. According to the law stating the age of criminal responsibility, girls above nine and boys above fifteen are judged and punished according to the Iranian Penal Code, which also implies corporal punishment for crimes concerning sex, false accusation, use of alcohol, and caused an injury. Therefore, girls above nine years old and boys above fifteen years old can be subject to flogging. However, if it is recognized that the offenders "do not realize the nature of the crime committed or its prohibition, or if there is uncertainty about their full mental development", corporal punishment cannot be applied and the offender will either be detained or charged with a fine. However, for Article 91 to be taken into consideration and be applied, it is required that the juvenile offender themselves claims the right to a retrial allowed by the mentioned article. The offenders below eighteen and their families are often unaware of this possibility and unable to afford a lawyer who can inform them about their rights, very few of them apply for a retrial.

==== Corporal punishment in the home ====
According to the Iranian Civil Code, "a child must obey its parents and must respect them regardless of their age" and in case of disobedience or for educational purposes, Iranian law allows corporal punishment in the home as long as the perpetrator is the guardian of the child. According to the Iranian Civil Code, "parents are entitled to punish their children, but they must not abuse this right by punishing their children beyond the limits of correction". Furthermore, the Islamic Penal Code states that "the acts committed by parents and legal guardians of minors and insane people to chastise or protect them provided that such actions are exercised within the customary limits, and religious limits for chastisement and protection".

=== Execution of juvenile offenders ===
The death penalty is currently in use in Iran, and the percentage of executions has increased by 300% from 2008 to 2015. Iran also detains the worldly record for the country executing the biggest number of juvenile offenders. The percentage of executions of minors substantially increased and later dropped in 2015. However, at the beginning of 2016, 160 offenders were on death row in Iran for crimes that they had committed before they had turned 18.

In 2016, the UN Committee on the Rights of the Child strongly urged Iran to end the execution of children and persons who committed a crime while under the age of 18. On 18 October 2017, various United Nations human rights experts stated that "Iran was continuing to execute juvenile offenders." The UN experts deplored the continued child executions in Iran. The UN experts said, "Iran should immediately and unconditionally abolish the sentencing of children to death, and engage in a comprehensive process of commutation of all death sentences issued against children, in line with juvenile justice standards." Iran has reportedly executed at least four juvenile offenders from January to October 2017, and at least 86 more are known to be on death row at the time, although the actual figure may be higher.

The reasons for which juvenile offenders were subject to the death penalty have mainly been murder and rape but "enmity against God" (moharebeh), theft and crimes related to drugs have also figured among the reasons for juvenile capital punishment. A recent tendency regarding capital punishment in the Islamic Republic of Iran is that of detaining the offenders until they turn eighteen and only execute them at that time. However, there is no legal obligation according to which executions should be postponed until the offender has reached the age of eighteen.

The updated version of the Islamic Penal Code of 2013 includes that youth between fifteen and eighteen who have committed crimes punishable with ta'zir will be exempt from execution. They will be subject to the detention of various durations, or fines of various values, depending on the seriousness of the offenses. However, when the crime committed is categorized under hudud and qisas, offenders under the age of eighteen execution are considered legally legitimate. Even in the case of hudud and qisas, when offenders under eighteen are thought not to have recognized the gravity of the crime, Article 91 of the Iranian Penal Code might be applied, and the offender might be exempt from death penalty.

Hanging is the most common form of capital punishment in Iran, and it is either carried out in prisons or publicly in squares.

The practice of stoning has been limited in the revised version of the Iranian Penal Code (2013). However, the new version of the Penal Code retains the use of stoning as a hadd punishment. The Article 225 states that "the hadd punishment for zina of a man and a woman who meet the conditions of ihsan shall be stoning to death".

In spite of the fact that the UN has condemned executions as a criminal punishment in Iran and has stressed the gravity of carrying out executions publicly, the perpetration of this practice in Iran has been reported.

On 21 February 2019, a group of United Nations human rights experts called on the Iranian regime to halt the imminent execution of Mohammad Kalhory, who was 15 when he committed the crime.

== Civil and political rights ==
=== Gender discrimination ===
Article 20 of the Iranian constitution guarantees the equal protection of the law to both men and women. Nevertheless, Iranian laws contain several practices which reinforce gender discrimination in the country. As noted above, the Iranian Penal and Civil Codes define a child at the age of 9 lunar years for girls, and 15 lunar years for boys. This grants fewer years of child protection to girls than boys, and denies them some of the protections of the Convention.

Article 907 of the Civil Code, on inheritance, also discriminates based on gender by granting male heirs twice as much as female heirs in the case of multiple children. Furthermore, Article 911 of the Civil Code states that in the case of the deceased having no surviving children, grandchildren inherit according to how much their parents would have received. Children of sons thus inherit more than children of daughters.

=== Citizenship and the right to nationality ===
Iranian nationality law contains principles of both jus sanguinis and jus soli. Nationality is passed through the father, meaning that children of Iranian mothers and non-Iranian fathers face difficulty in acquiring Iranian nationality.

Recognizing this, in the Third Periodic Report on the CRC the Iranian government pointed out the 2006 Single Article Act on Deciding on the Nationality of Children Born as a Result of Marriage of Iranian Women and Foreign National Men, which states that children born in Iran "as a result of the marriage of Iranian women to foreign national men, may, upon attaining the age of 18, apply for acquiring Iranian nationality." This would be granted providing the child has no criminal or security record, and that they revoke any non-Iranian nationality. The Iranian Majles estimated that the law would assist the approximately 120,000 children left in "citizenship limbo".

This law has been criticized for not going far enough to protect the rights of children. Many non-Iranian fathers are Afghan or Iraqi undocumented migrants or refugees. Iranian law requires that an Iranian woman receives permission to marry a foreign national, and as asylum-seekers are often not legally registered, their marriages cannot be registered and as such their children cannot receive birth certificates.

=== Education ===
The constitution of the Islamic Republic of Iran states that the government is responsible for providing all citizens with free education up to secondary school The central government, through the Ministry of Education, is responsible for financing and administering K-12 education. It supervises national examinations, monitors standards, organizes curricula and the training of teachers, produces educational materials, and upholds and develops infrastructure. Education is supervised through provincial authorities and district offices at the local level.

Iran's expenditure on education is higher than the global average. According to UNESCO, 17% of government expenditure in Iran went to education, a relatively high number compared to the global average of 14.3%.

Early marriage is one of the main contributors to the school dropout rate, as Iranian regulations limit access to school for married children, as they are only allowed to participate in final exams, and are not eligible to attend classes or night schools.

== Child Labor ==
Iranian labor law prohibits the employment of children under the age of 15. Children aged 15–18, referred to as "young workers", are required to undergo regular medical exams by the Ministry of Labor to be eligible for partaking in the workforce. Furthermore, employers are prohibited from assigning youth to "overtime work, shift work, or arduous, harmful or dangerous work". However, the Labor Law allows businesses with less than 10 staff members to be exempted from certain law provisions, including maximum work-hour requirements, overtime pay, and disability benefits. Iran has ratified the International Labor Office (ILO) convention on the Worst Forms of Child Labor.

Despite some judicial safeguards to prevent the exploitation of children, Iran has been criticized for its high number of child laborers, and many cases of exploitation have been reported by human rights organizations. Figures regarding the number of child and youth laborers vary. According to the 2011 national census, more than 900,000 were not in schools between the ages of 6 and 14 years. Some of the most common reasons for not being in school were reportedly due to early marriage and child labor, leading to dropouts. There is currently no official data on the number of child laborers, with the most recent official figures available from the 2011 Iranian national census. According to the 2011 census, there were 68,558 child laborers aged 10 to 14, and 696,700 aged 15 to 18. According to the National Council of Resistance of Iran (NCRI), up to 3.1 million of Iranian minors are not in school, of which half are in the workforce.

In the official census of Iran in 1996, more than 4% of the working population of Iran was between 10 – 14 years old. In these statistics, the working population of Iran was 14.5 million people, so the number of children working aged 10–14, which was 4%, is about 600 thousand. In 1996, there were about 380,000 children aged 10 to 14 in Iran who had fixed work.

Many children in different cities are also involved in street vendors. The parents of most of them are addicted to drugs, and these children are subject to child abuse and sexual exploitation.

During the 2026 Iran war, Rahim Nadali, an IRGC official in Tehran, announced the launch of the initiative "For Iran" which recruits 12 year olds into the Basij militia for them to assist in manning "operational patrols" and checkpoints, as well as providing logistical support and performing other duties. This move contradicts Iran's commitment to abstain from the use of children in military activities under the Convention on the Rights of the Child. However, Nadali justified to move stating "Given that the age of those coming forward has dropped and they are asking to take part, we lowered the minimum age to 12". According to Al-Arabiya, from the beginning of the war, Tehran residents reported of untrained teenagers and youths armed with Uzi sub-machine guns and Kalshnikov rifles, stopping vehicles, shouting orders, and firing warning shots into the air.

== Trafficking of children ==
Iran is used as a source, transit, and destination country for the sex trafficking of children. Young Iranian girls are especially vulnerable to trafficking, which has been argued partly caused by poverty and government laws that are exclusionary towards females. The workforce is very male-dominant, as only 15 percent of all females have a job.

Runaway girls are considered especially vulnerable to trafficking and prostitution. In a BBC interview in 2005, Dr. Hadi Motamedi, the head of the Social Ills Prevention Unit of the Health Ministry, said that most runaway girls are subject to rape within the first 24 hours. According to Motamedi, the majority of these rape victims are then rejected upon returning to their families. Shelters set up for runaways have also become known as a source for finding prostitutes and children for selling. According to the head judiciary of the Tehran province, traffickers usually aim for girls between 13 and 17, although there have been some reports of girls as young as 8 to 10 being trafficked. There have also been reports of several cases of infant trafficking in Iran.

== Child marriage ==
Currently, the minor age of marriage for girls in Iran is thirteen lunar years while it is fifteen lunar years for boys. However, for a male individual, it is still possible to petition a court to marry a child below the minimum age of marriage as the decision whether or not the child should get married is still in the hands of their guardian. According to the Civil Code of Iran, after turning thirteen, virgin girls marrying for the first time require a father's or grandfather's permission solely. Previously, the minimum age for marriage was 15 years for girls and 18 years for boys, and in special circumstances and with the presentation of a court certificate, girls at the age of 13 and boys at the age of 15 could get married; Therefore, the marriage under the age of 13 was completely prohibited.

The law of Protection of without Guardian Children Act, adopted by Iran in 1975, underwent changes in 2013. In the new version, article 27 states that "If the head of the family wants to marry the adopted child, he should send her details to a court for approval. If the marriage has already taken place, Welfare State Organisation must report it to the court, upon which the decision on the continuation of the care by the same family or its cancellation will be decided".

According to statistics provided by UNICEF, between 2008 and 2014, 3% of Iranian adolescents got married by the age of fifteen, and 17% by the age of eighteen The statistics of 2010 show that 43, 457 cases of children under the age of 15 have been registered officially for marriage. 90 percent of the statistics are related to young girls. But research shows that the number of children's marriages is not limited to statistics, since in rural areas children are married and live for years without formal marriage. Also according to the statistics in 2012, 37,000 children aged 10 to 18 were divorced or widowed. Each year, 800 girls from 10 to 14 years old and 15,000 girls aged 15 to 19 are divorced in Iran. Poverty and traditional beliefs are the cause of these early marriages. In most cases, the son-in-law's family pays money to the bride's family, who are often poor to marry their under-aged daughter. The implications of early marriage include increased illiteracy and ill-treatment among women, polygamy, house-venting, and spousal phenomena.

== See also ==
- Convention on the Rights of the Child
- Declaration of the Rights of the Child
- Human rights in Iran
- Human rights in the Islamic Republic of Iran

== Notes ==
1. A lunar year, which is the measurement that the lunar calendar is based on, differences in length from the solar year by eleven to twelve days. Therefore, nine lunar years correspond to approximately eight solar years and eight months and fifteen lunar years are approximately fourteen solar years and seven months.
2. Ihsan is the status of a married man who can have vaginal intercourse with his wife "whenever he wishes".Ihsan also refers to the status of a woman who can have vaginal intercourse with her husband. (Iranian Penal Code, Article 226)
3. The UN defines a child laborer as either a) a child 5-11 years old who either takes part in at least 1 hour of economic activity or at least 28 hours of household chores per week or b) a child 12-14 years old who takes part in at least 14 hours of economic activity or at least 28 hours of household chores per week. (UNICEF, A State of the Worlds Children 2016). Another definition proposed by ILO's Statistical Information and Monitoring Program on Child Labor (SIMPOC) defines a child as a child laborer if he/she is involved in economic activity, is under 12 years old, and works one or more hours per week, or is 14 years old or under and works at least 14 hours per week, or is 14 years old or under and works at least one hour per week in hazardous activities, or is 17 or under and works in an "unconditional worst form of child labor" (prostitution, children in bondage or forced labor, armed conflict, trafficked children, pornography, and other illicit activities).
