= Inter-Agency Guiding Principles on Unaccompanied and Separated Children =

The Inter-Agency Guiding Principles on Unaccompanied and Separated Children is a document and set of guidelines agreed upon among six international organizations, including:

- International Committee of the Red Cross (ICRC)
- International Rescue Committee (IRC)
- Save the Children UK (SCUK)
- United Nations Children’s Fund (UNICEF)
- United Nations High Commissioner for Refugees (UNHCR)
- World Vision International (WVI)
