= Commune, Bamako =

Commune, Bamako may refer to various communes in Bamako, Mali such as:

- Commune I, Bamako
- Commune II, Bamako
- Commune III, Bamako
- Commune IV, Bamako
- Commune V, Bamako
- Commune VI, Bamako
