= List of buildings and structures in Mali =

A list of notable buildings and structures in Mali:

== Bamako ==
- Hippodrome, Bamako
- Mali National Museum
- Bamako Grand Mosque
- Stade Omnisports
- National Library of Mali
- BCEAO Tower
- King Fahd Bridge
- Martyrs Bridge
- National Museum of Mali
- Palais de la Culture Amadou Hampaté Ba
