= Timeline of Bamako =

The following is a timeline of the history of the city of Bamako, Mali.

== Prior to 20th century ==
- 16th century – Bambara in power.
- c. 1650 – Sériba Niaré, allied with Biton Coulibaly of the Segou Empire, settles in the area.
- c. 1700 – founding of the kafu of Bamako by Diamusa Niaré, Sériba's son.
- 1806 – Mungo Park passes through Bamako.
- c. 1825 – Bamako attacks Samaniana and is repulsed. Requests support from Da Mansong Diarra and destroys the town
- 1880 – Mandinka Samory Touré in power (approximate date).
- 1883
  - 1 February: Town occupied by French forces under command of Gustave Borgnis-Desbordes.
  - April: Battles of Woyowoyanko, Samory Toure's forces repulsed just south of Bamako.
  - Fort built by French.

== 20th century ==
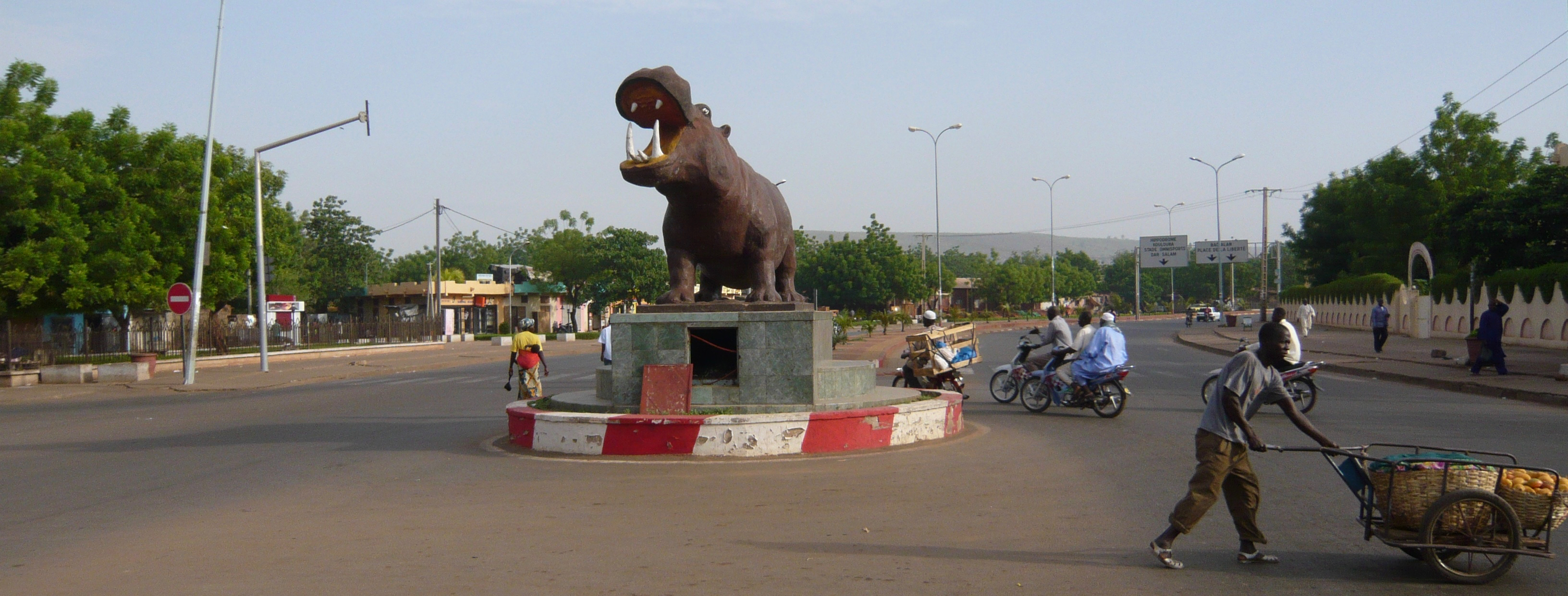
Hippo statue, Boulevard de l'indépendance, erected 1990s (photo 2008)

- 1903 – ** Kafo-tigi Dioke Niaré dies. The family's slaves claim their freedom.
  - French fort demolished.
- 1904 – Koulikoro-Bamako railway built.
- 1906 – Chamber of commerce established.
- 1907 – Palais de Koulouba (presidential residence) built.
- 1908 – 23 May: Capital of French colonial Upper Senegal and Niger relocated to Bamako from Kayes.
- 1919 – Bamako becomes a "commune-mixte" (form of administration).^{(fr)}
- 1920
  - Bamako becomes capital of colonial French Sudan.
  - Population: 16,000 (estimate).
- 1921 – Catholic Apostolic Vicariate of Bamako active.
- 1923 – Dakar-Bamako railroad begins operating.
- 1924 – Monument aux héros de l'Armee Noire dedicated.
- 1927 – Sacred Heart Cathedral built.
- 1929 – "Submersible causeway to Sotuba" built across the Niger River.
- 1933 – Ecole Artisanale du Soudan (art school) established (later Institut National des Arts de Bamako).
- 1934 – Institut de la Lèpre (medical entity) begins operating.
- 1936 – Population: 21,000 (estimate).
- 1945 – Population: 36,000 (estimate).
- 1946 – Rassemblement Démocratique Africain political party headquartered in city.
- 1947 – Dakar–Niger Railway labor strike.
- 1948 – Photographer Seydou Keïta in business.
- 1949 – L'Essor newspaper begins publication.
- 1953 – Sudanese Museum opens.
- 1956 – Modibo Keïta elected mayor.
- 1958
  - Vincent Auriol Bridge built.
  - Photographer Malick Sidibé in business.
  - Population: 76,000.
- 1960
  - City becomes capital of the Republic of Mali.
  - Djoliba AC (football club) formed.
  - Stade Modibo Kéïta (stadium) opens.
  - Population: 130,00 urban agglomeration.
- 1963 – École Normale Supérieure of Bamako opens.
- 1965
  - Centre français de documentation de Bamako founded.
  - Population: 168,000.
- 1970s – Grand Mosque of Bamako built.
- 1972 – Population: 225,000 (estimate).
- 1974
  - Twin city relationship established with Angers, France.
  - Bamako–Sénou Airport opens.
- 1975 – Sister city relationship established with Rochester, New York, United States.
- 1976 – ** Population 419,239
- 1977 – 18 May: Funeral of Modibo Keita.
- 1978
  - District of Bamako created, consisting of six communes: Commune I, II, III, IV, V, and VI, each with its own mayor.^{(fr)}
  - Groupe Bogolan Kasobané (artisan group) formed.
- 1980 – March: Saharan states summit held in city.
- 1982 – National Museum of Mali active.
- 1983 – Office de Radiodiffusion-Télévision du Mali headquartered in city.
- 1984 – October: Meeting of Economic Community of West African States held in city.
- 1987
  - "Islamic centre" built.
  - African health ministers meet in city, adopt "Bamako Initiative" for healthcare.
  - Population: 658,275 in city.
- 1989 – Les Échos newspaper begins publication.
- 1990s – Hippopotamus statue erected.
- 1991
  - 22 March: Anti-government protest; crackdown.
  - 26 March: 1991 Malian coup d'état occurs.
- 1992
  - 19 January: Malian municipal election, 1992 held.
  - King Fahd Bridge opens.
- 1994
  - Rencontres africaines de la photographie biennial exhibit begins.
  - BCEAO Tower built.
- 1995 – Monument de l'Indépendance and Monument to the Martyrs dedicated.^{(fr)}
- 1996
  - University of Bamako opens.
  - Monument to Daniel Ouezzin Coulibaly dedicated.^{(fr)}
- 1998
  - Cadre de promotion pour la formation en photographie de Bamako established.
  - Ibrahima N'Diaye becomes district mayor.
  - Population: 1,016,167 in city.
- 2000
  - Fresques murales de Koulouba (monument) built.^{(fr)}
  - Monument to Kwame Nkrumah dedicated.^{(fr)}
  - Sister city relationship established with São Paulo, Brazil.

== 21st century ==
- 2001
  - Kita-Bamako road constructed.
  - Stade du 26 Mars (stadium) opens.
- 2002
  - 2002 African Cup of Nations football contest held in Bamako.
  - Monument to Patrice Lumumba dedicated.^{(fr)}
- 2003 – Moussa Badoulaye Traoré becomes district mayor.
- 2005
  - Budapest-Bamako car race begins.
  - Geekcorps office established.
- 2007 – Adama Sangaré becomes district mayor.
- 2009
  - Institut national de la statistique (Mali) headquartered in city.
  - Population: 1,810,366 urban agglomeration.
- 2011
  - Université des lettres et des sciences humaines de Bamako, Université des sciences, des techniques et des technologies de Bamako, Université des sciences juridiques et politiques de Bamako, Université des sciences sociales et de gestion de Bamako established.
  - Institut français du Mali active.
- 2015 – 20 November: 2015 Bamako hotel attack occurs in Hippodrome.
- 2016 – 21 March: Attack on headquarters of the European Union military training mission in Bamako.
- 2022 – ** Population 4,227,569 in capital district

== See also ==
- Bamako history
- Timeline of Mali

== Bibliography ==
=== in English ===
- Mariken Vaa (2000). "Housing Policy After Political Transition: The Case of Bamako" (PDF). Environment and Urbanization. 12 (1): 27. Bibcode:2000EnUrb..12...27V. doi:10.1177/095624780001200103.
- Paul Tiyambe Zeleza; Dickson Eyoh, eds. (2003). "Bamako, Mali". Encyclopedia of Twentieth-Century African History. Routledge. ISBN 0415234794.
- Sophie Dulucq (2005). "Bamako". In Kevin Shillington (ed.). Encyclopedia of African History. Fitzroy Dearborn. ISBN 978-1-57958-245-6.
- "Bamako," New Encyclopedia of Africa 2nd Edition, editors John Middleton and Joseph Miller (Detroit: Charles Scribner's Sons, 2008)
- Elizabeth Heath (2010). "Bamako, Mali". In Kwame Anthony Appiah; Henry Louis Gates (eds.). Encyclopedia of Africa. Oxford University Press. ISBN 9780195337709.
- Roman A. Cybriwsky (2013). "Bamako". Capital Cities around the World: An Encyclopedia of Geography, History, and Culture. ABC-CLIO. pp. 30–31. ISBN 978-1-61069-248-9.
- Perinbam, B. M. (1999). Family Identity And The State In The Bamako Kafu. Routledge. doi:10.4324/9780429500558. ISBN 978-0-429-50055-8.
- Mary Jo Arnoldi (2016). "Locating history in concrete and bronze: civic monuments in Bamako, Mali". In Cher Krause Knight; Harriet F. Senie (eds.). A Companion to Public Art. Wiley. ISBN 978-1-118-47534-8.
- Courage Kamusoko (2017). "Bamako Metropolitan Area". In Yuji Murayama; et al. (eds.). Urban Development in Asia and Africa: Geospatial Analysis of Metropolises. Springer. pp. 275–292. ISBN 978-981-10-3241-7.

=== in French ===
- Marie-Louise Villien-Rossi (1963). "Bamako, capitale du Mali". Cahiers d'Outre-Mer (in French). 16 – via Persee.fr.
- École normale supérieure de Bamako (1993). Bamako. Pays Enclaves (in French). Université de Bordeaux. ISBN 978-2-905081-22-3.
- M. Bertrand (1995). "Bamako, d'une république à l'autre". Les Annales de la recherche urbaine (in French). 66 (66): 40–51. doi:10.3406/aru.1995.1855 – via Persee.fr.
- Monique Bertrand (1998). "Marchés fonciers en transition: le cas de Bamako (Mali)". Annales de géographie (in French). 107 (602): 381–409. doi:10.3406/geo.1998.20863 – via Persee.fr.
- Sébastien Philippe (2009). Une histoire de Bamako (in French). Grandvaux. ISBN 978-2-909550-64-0.
- Kévin Croix; et al. (2013). "Quelle 'place' pour des pêcheurs urbains? Le cas de Bamako (Mali)" [Which 'place' for urban fishermen? The case of Bamako]. Cybergeo (in French) (648). doi:10.4000/cybergeo.25977 – via Revues.org.
