= AJM =

AJM may refer to:

- Distinguished Young Women, formerly known as America's Junior Miss
- Air Jamaica (ICAO airline designator AJM)
- Abrasive jet machining
- American Journal of Mathematics
- Association des Juristes Maliennes, an association of women jurists in Mali
- Australian Jazz Museum
