= Alpha Yaya Sangaré =

Malian soldier and whistleblower

Colonel Alpha Yaya Sangaré is a Malian military officer and whistleblower who was detained in 2024 after publishing a book documenting human rights abuses by the Malian Armed Forces.

== Career ==
Sangaré joined the National Gendarmerie, a military force with law enforcement duties, after graduating from a military school in 1999 in Koulikoro, where he trained alongside Abdoulaye Maïga; his father had also been a police officer. Following the 2020 coup d'état, which saw the removal of the government of Ibrahim Boubacar Keïta and the establishment of a military junta, Sangaré became the commander of the newly established Bamako gendarmerie region. He attained the rank of colonel within the Malian Armed Forces.

Following the 2020 coup d'état, Sangaré had called for a transition to a civilian-led government.

Sangaré obtained a master's degree from Wilmington University in Delaware in the United States. In August 2022, Sangaré defended his PhD thesis, entitled "Terrorism and the fight against terrorism in Mali: problems, issues and institutional challenges" at Cheikh Anta Diop University in Dakar, Senegal.

== Whistleblowing and arrest ==
In 2023, Sangaré published a book entitled Mali: The Challenge of Terrorism in Africa (French: Mali: le défi du terrorisme en Afrique), in which he criticised the Malian Armed Forces for abusing human rights during its ongoing fight against the Islamist insurgency in northern Mali from 2016. Citing research from his doctoral thesis as well as reports from international human rights organisations like Human Rights Watch, the book detailed extrajudicial killings, enforced disappearances, torture, and arbitrary arrests of people suspected to be supportive of Islamists. Sangaré concluded that the abuses occurred with the complicity of the military hierarchy.

Initially published to little national attention, Sangaré and the book received greater notice following a signing at the Bamako Peacekeeping School on 24 February 2024, which was attended by government workers including Abdoulaye Maïga, the Minister of Territorial Administration and Decentralisation and former acting Prime Minister of Mali. On 1 March 2024, Mali: The Challenge of Terrorism in Africa was denounced in a statement by the Ministry of Defence, who accused Sangaré of making "false accusations" against the Malian Armed Forces. Maïga also released a statement distancing himself from Sangaré and stating he had not read the book prior to attending the event.

On 2 March 2024, Sangaré was abducted from his home in Bamako by unidentified hooded men, who drove away in a vehicle without licence plates. On 3 February 2024, his family confirmed his disappearance to Agence France-Presse. Later that day, the Malian military confirmed Sangaré's arrest, but did not confirm where he was being detained. An anonymous source stated Sangaré's arrest without a warrant had been justified due to his status as a colonel criticising the military. Sangaré was later reported to be being detained at a gendarmerie camp in Bamako.

=== Response ===
Human Rights Watch criticised Sangaré's arrest as evidence of Malian authorities attacking whistleblowers rather than addressing the abuses being reported on, and called for Sangaré's immediate release.

== Works ==
- Sangaré, Alpha Yaya. Mali: le défi du terrorisme en Afrique. Ivry-sur-Seine: Points Sur Les I Eds Les. 2023. ISBN 2359302558.
