= Tidiani (Jeff) Tall =

African businessman and author (born 1969)

Tidiani "Jeff" Tall
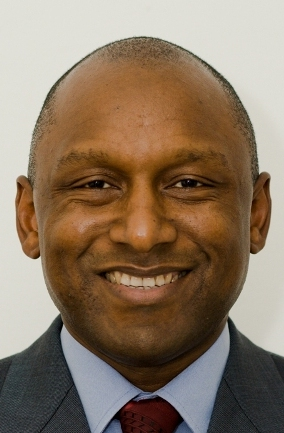
- Born: Tidiani Tall; May 25, 1969 (age 56); Bamako, Mali
- Other names: Jeff Tall; Tidjane Tall; Tidjani Tall; Tijani Tall; T. Jeff Tall
- Education: Rochambeau French International School; Prytanée national militaire
- Alma mater: French Institute of Petroleum; École polytechnique
- Notable work: Fixing Africa: Once and for All
- Relatives: Umar Tall (great-great-grandfather)

Tidiani Tall (born May 25, 1969), commonly known as Jeff Tall, is a West African business leader, public speaker, entrepreneur, and the author of Fixing Africa: Once and for All.

== Early life, family, and education ==
Tall is a great-grandson of the West African King Agibu Tall, the son of Emperor Umar Tall of the Toucouleur Empire. He was born in Bamako, Mali, where he lived until he was 7 years old when his father, Maki Tall, became Ambassador of Mali to Saudi Arabia. He was subsequently Ambassador to the United States, which required moving his family to Washington, D.C., where Tall studied at the Rochambeau French International School in Bethesda, Maryland from 1982. It was here that he gained a taste for American football and became a Washington Redskins fan. His father's post of Ambassador afforded Tall the opportunity to meet U.S. presidents Jimmy Carter and Ronald Reagan. After returning to Mali, Maki Tall became the Director of International Cooperation at the Ministry of Foreign Affairs (Bamako). He later served as Ambassador of Mali to Germany and the United Arab Emirates, and is currently the traditional ruler of Bandiagara in Mali.

In 1985, Tall was enrolled at Prytanée national militaire, a cadet school in La Flèche, France. In 1990, he was admitted to the elite Ecole Polytechnique of Paris where he stayed for three years before studying for one year at the French Institute of Petroleum, also in Paris. He holds a Masters in Economics & Management from the French Institute of Petroleum in Paris, France and a Masters in Engineering in applied mathematics from Ecole Polytechnique also in Paris, France.

== Career ==
In 1994, Tall was hired to join the Analyst program in the Fixed Income division at Morgan Stanley in London as 1 of 10 high potential graduates from across Europe. After 18 months at Morgan Stanley, driven by a desire to "contribute to his native home of Mali through entrepreneurial endeavours", Tall returned to Mali to create and run a road transport company. Timbuktu Trading & Transport ("3T") became the first trucking company in Mali that met international standards in safety and employment practices.

Subsequent to running 3T for three years, Tall moved on to found a dot-com startup based in New York City called eSpirituality. The website won acclaim from New Age magazine, was named a Yahoo site of the day and was featured on MSN. Of memorable note was an interactive dream analysis section held by the resident "Dr. Dream". At the end of 2000, eSpirituality became a casualty of the dot-com bubble. In January 2001, Tall began another extended foray into professional services, first by joining Roland Berger Strategy Consultants to work in their Paris and New York offices as a Senior Consultant. Two years later, he left to co-found a New York-based consulting boutique called Expansion USA, which developed a reputation by assisting European companies and institutions in establishing and expanding their presence in the United States marketplace. Four years later, he moved to Dubai and created the marketing and communications agency A+ Marketing. In April 2010, he joined Lafarge as Vice President of Supply Chain & Distribution, in Sub-Saharan Africa. He is also a member of the African Leadership Network and of Africa 2.0.

Tall has worked with international organizations including ExxonMobil, Total, Shell, MasterCard, Lycos and Daimler Chrysler. Currently, he is the CEO of Lidera Green Power, a renewable energy independent power producer (IPP) in Madagascar.

== Fixing Africa: Once and for All ==
Fixing Africa: Once and for All is a 2009 book focused on "improving Africa and moving it forward from the hardships that have plagued the continent's past." A child of Pan-Africanism, the premise surrounds a conglomeration of Africa's 54 countries currently represented into 3 "Super Federations" by the year 2030.

Tall believes the hope for change lies within and must be "led by the youth and enabled by [effective use of] information technology."

=== Inspiration ===
Tall's inspiration for Fixing Africa came from the "hypocrisy" of the fiftieth anniversary independence celebrations held in many African nations between 2007 and 2010, in particular the fiftieth anniversary of Guinea's independence from France in 2008. "This destitute country had honestly nothing to celebrate with such an economic situation" he said in 2011. Multimillion-dollar celebrations were occurring in spite of what Tall saw as decades of lost progress and a population largely living in misery and humiliation. His goal was to "inform a new generation of Africans and set high expectations within them to ensure that, with the ascension of a new breed of leaders might Africa's people be delivered out of poverty, diseases, wars, famine, economic meltdown, political paralysis, and 360-degree insecurity."

=== Key messages ===
Summarized, Fixing Africa is based on three key ideals:

- All 54 African countries are struggling. The denial must end so the recovery can start.
- Individually African men and women have shown that they can perform at a global level in any field, anytime and anywhere.
- New ideas and bold actions are required to translate individual achievements into collective progress.

=== Alternative viewpoints ===
Dambisa Moyo, author and economist, discusses the counterintuitive negative impact associated with African aid in the book Dead Aid. Moyo "describes the state of postwar development policy in Africa today and unflinchingly confronts one of the greatest myths of our time: that billions of dollars in aid sent from wealthy countries to developing African nations has helped to reduce poverty and increase growth."

Martin Meredith, historian and journalist, provides a controversial Western viewpoint on fifty years of African independence, and the many failures that have accompanied it, in the book The Fate of Africa: A History of Fifty Years of Independence.

== Personal life ==
Tall currently travels the world but splits the majority of his time between Paris, France, and Addis Ababa, Ethiopia.

== Works ==
- Tall, Tidiani (2009). Fixing Africa: Once and for All. Self-published.
