= Samuel Sidibé =

Samuel Sidibé is the Director of the National Museum of Mali.

== Biography ==
In 1975, he received a master's degree in Art History and Archaeology from the University of Clermont-Ferrand. In 1980, he received a Ph.D. in History of African Societies from the Sorbonne.

He sits on the advisory board of the Stiftung Preußischer Kulturbesitz.

== Awards ==
In 2006, Sidibé was awarded the Prince Claus Prize.

He is an Officer of the Ordre des Arts et des Lettres.
