= Noé Sissoko =

Malian footballer (born 1983)

Personal information
- Full name: Noé Sissoko
- Date of birth: 2 June 1983 (age 43)
- Place of birth: Bamako, Mali
- Height: 1.91 m (6 ft 3 in)
- Position: Midfielder

Team information
- Current team: Dreux

Senior career*
| Years | Team | Apps | (Gls) |
| 1998–2000 | Stade Malien | ? | (?) |
| 2000–2004 | Cercle Olympique | ? | (?) |
| 2004 | Dreux | ? | (?) |
| 2004–2005 | Créteil-Lusitanos | 0 | (0) |
| 2006 | Notts County | 3 | (0) |
| 2006–2007 | Kerkyra | ? | (?) |
| 2007– | Dreux | ? | (?) |
- * Club domestic league appearances and goals as of 10:14, 21 August 2011 (UTC)

Noé Sissoko (born 2 June 1983 in Bamako, Mali) is a Malian footballer playing as a midfielder for Dreux, and has also played in Football League for Notts County. He is the brother of Mali international footballer Mohamed Sissoko and Abdoulwhaid Sissoko.

== Career ==
Sissoko was one of sixteen siblings and from a footballing family, and started his career in the Malian Première Division with Stade Malien and Cercle Olympique. Sissoko finally got his chance in Europe in 2004 when he signed for FC Drouais. His stay at Dreux was short, and he was signed by Ligue 2 side US Créteil-Lusitanos on a three-year contract. He failed to make an appearance for Créteil and his contract was terminated early in 2005 at his own request. In September 2005, he underwent a trial at Football League One side Swansea City and impressed in a friendly against Team Bath. Sissoko was offered a three month contract with the Welsh side but due to problems with his partner's work permit he rejected the offer. Sissoko was also scouted by several English clubs but in February 2006 he signed for Football League Two side Notts County on a deal until the end of the season. He made his debut for the club on 14 February 2006, in a 2–1 home defeat to Wycombe Wanderers at Meadow Lane. He played two more games for the Magpies before he was released in the summer. He signed for Greek Super League side Kerkyra in 2006 and stayed there for one season. In the summer of 2007 he signed for French sixth division side FC Drouais.

== Personal life ==
He holds both Malian and French nationalities.
