= Sidy Fassara Diabaté =

Malian film director

- Born: 1950 (age 74–75); Bamako, Mali
- Occupation: Film director
- Years active: 1986-present

Sidy Fassara Diabaté (born 1950) is a Malian film director.

== Biography ==
Born in Bamako, Diabaté attended Bamako High School. He furthered his studies at the Ecole Normale Supérieure de Bamako and graduated in 1974. Diabaté was a history and geography teacher at Lycée Notre Dame du Niger and was assigned to oversee baccalaureate examinations. In 1979, he opted to pursue a cinematic career after taking part in a competition organized by the Ministry of Information. He was not initially interested in the cinema, but came to see it as an excellent means of cultural expression. Diabaté trained in filmmaking at the Centre National de Production Cinématographique. In 1986, he directed his first short film, Veillée à Bolongué.

Diabaté led the committee the drafted the law on the film industry from 1991 to 1998. He formed his reputation by doing internships in Mali and Burkina Faso. He took a backpack officer course. In 2003, Diabaté directed his first documentary, Le Mali en marche. He worked in Mali's nascent television industry but always had his attention on films. Diabaté directed a second short film, Le Mali, pays au féminin, in 2007.

In 2011, he came out with his first feature film, Da Monzon, la conquête de Samanyana. The film was released after taking four years to write the screenplay, find funding, shoot, and edit the picture. It was shot in the Ségou Region and details the efforts of a 19th-century king to maintain power. Da Monzon, la conquête de Samanyana received the feature film special prize for integration from the West African Economic and Monetary Union.

Diabaté served as deputy director general at the National Center of Cinematography of Mali (CNCM) until his retirement in 2013. He was honored with a retirement ceremony organized by the Minister of Culture, Bruno Maïga. Diabaté is married and has two sons and two daughters.

== Filmography ==
- 1986 : Veillée à Bolongué (short film)
- 2003 : Le Mali en marche (documentary)
- 2007 : Le Mali, pays au féminin (short film)
- 2011 : Da Monzon, la conquête de Samanyana
