= Eyoub Mosque =

Mosque in Bamako, Mali

- Mosquée de Eyoub

Religion
- Affiliation: Islam

Location
- Location: Bamako, Mali

Architecture
- Type: Mosque
- Style: Ottoman
- Funded by: Government of Turkey
- Established: 2013
- Groundbreaking: 2012
- Completed: 2013
- Construction cost: XOF2 billion

The Eyoub Mosque (French: Mosquée de Eyoub) is a mosque in Hamdallaye Aci, Bamako, Mali.

== History ==
The mosque was constructed with a cost of XOF2 billion which was fully funded by the Government of Turkey. The construction started in 2012 and completed a year later in 2013.

== Architecture ==
The mosque was constructed in Ottoman architectural style. Its interior design features a central fault decorated with Islamic calligraphy. Its wall is made of marbles and filled with tinted glass brought from Turkey.

== See also ==
- Islam in Mali
