= Cité Niger =

Neighborhood of Bamako, Mali

Coordinates: 12.635700°N 7.974239°W

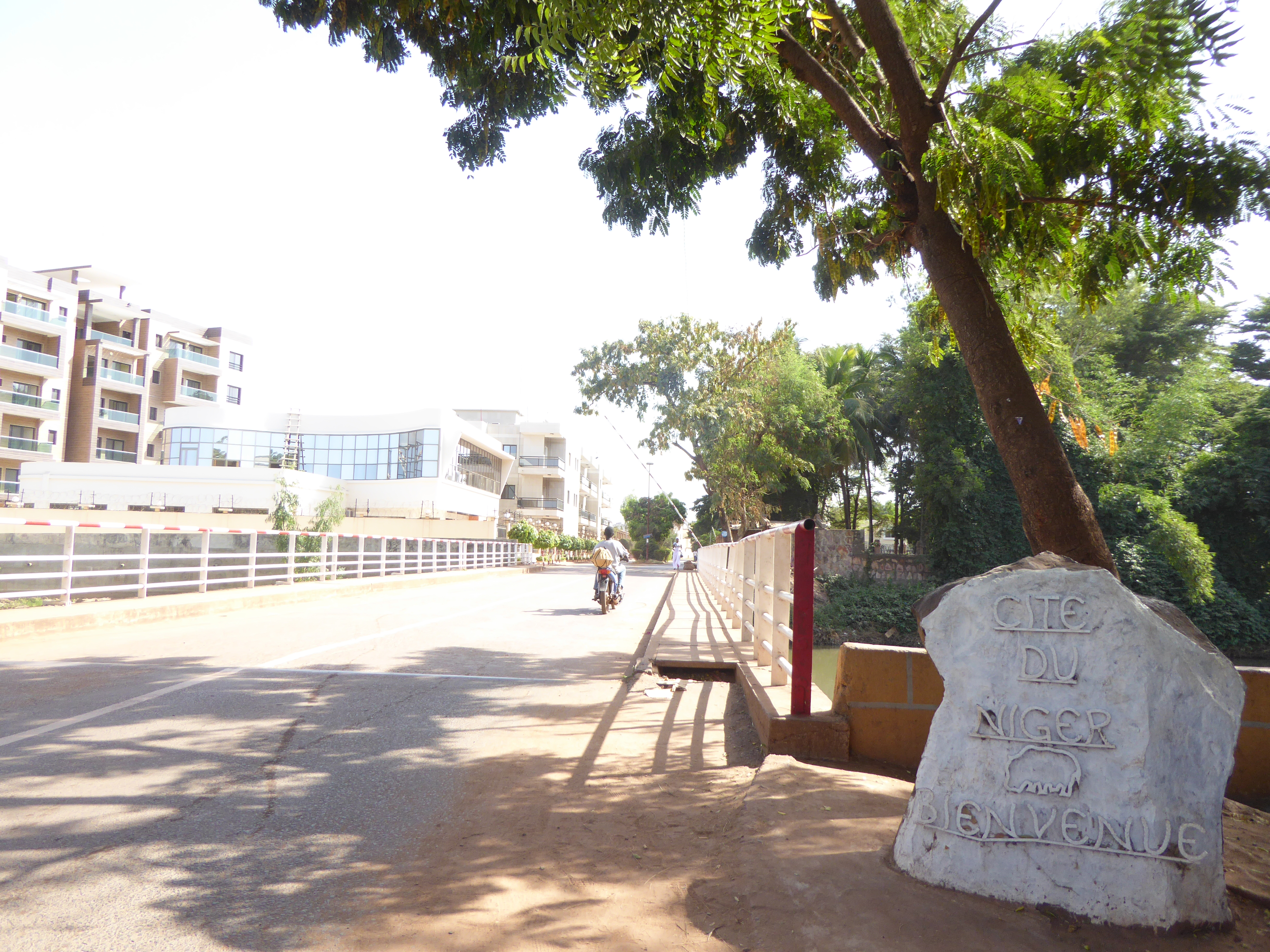
Western bridge to Cité du Niger

Cité Niger, also called "Cité du Niger" is a Bamako neighborhood, and an island in the Niger River. The Cité du Niger is located in the Commune 2 of the Bamako district.
