= Association des Juristes Maliennes =

The Association des Juristes Maliennes (AJM), or Women Jurists of Mali Association, (French: Association des Femmes Juristes du Mali) is an organization which tries to promote and protect women's rights in Malian law. An apolitical organization, the AJM's membership consists of around fifty women lawyers, solicitors, magistrates and judges. It is a member organization of Groupe Pivot / Droits et Citoyenneté des Femmes (GP/DCF). Fatoumata Dembélé Diarra is a past president.

== History ==
The AJM was officially established in 1988. In the 1990s it used funding from international aid agencies to provide mobile legal clinics to rural women in Mali, and broadcast a radio program, 'La Voix des Femmes'. AJM lawyers, with the help of the American Embassy, published a 1995 study of discriminatory elements in Malian law, The study was "a major impetus for altering discriminatory articles in the law".

In November 2014, the AJM reported over 150 victims of forced marriage and sexual violence. Six organizations, including the AJM, filed a complaint to the Bamako Commune III Court of First Instance on behalf of 80 victims of rape and sexual violence committed by armed groups during the Mali War in 2012–13.
