= Union Malienne Des Aveugles =

UMAV - Union Malienne Des Aveugles
- Bamako; Mali

Information
- Type: Integrated school and centre for the blind and partially sighted
- Established: 1972
- Founder: Ismael Konate
- Specialist: Blind and partially sighted
- President: Moumouni Diarra
- Gender: Co-educational
- Age: 4 to 20
- Enrolment: 350 (Jan 2012)
- Website: www.umav-mali.org

Union Malienne Des Aveugles (UMAV) is an institute for the blind in Mali. It consists of a primary school, secondary school, optical clinic, opticians, vocational workshops, a sound library and recreational area and plans for a college are underway.

Within the workshops, they produce high quality chalk sticks and white cleaning mats that are sold to generate revenue.

The opticians department provides free optical care and tailor-made glasses for all students and is also open to the general public.

UMAV assists the government to ensure Welfare for the Blind, to establish equal opportunities for all so partially sighted and blind individuals can participate in the overall process of socio-economic development of the nation.

== Schools ==
UMAV consists of three schools, in the cities of Bamako, Gao and Segou. The headquarters are located at their Bamako site. It is one of only two providers of education for the blind or partially sighted in the whole of Mali.

== History ==
Founded in September 1972 by Ismael Konate under the name Malian Association for the Welfare of the Blind (AMPSA), it was later renamed UMAV in 1984. Since then from the schools, there have been 85 blind and visually impaired graduates with 83 integrated in the public and private sector.

Since its creation, more than 25 classrooms have been built in Bamako and Gao. After its success, land was then purchased for the school in Segou. Two dormitories have since been built for boys and girls as some children had to travel far to get to the schools. Also, a round meeting hut, study room and resource center for training was built.

Recently the computer room has been adapted for blind users, with a computer that prints braille, which is the only one of its kind in Mali.

== Alumni ==
The musical duo Amadou & Mariam attended the school.

== Objectives ==
- To maintain a screening campaign for the prevention of eye disease in Mali.
- Ensure standardization, socialization and access to education and culture for blind children and to ensure they are seen as equals with sighted children.
- Fight against begging in cities and ensure blind individuals are in employment.
- Avoid marginalization of the blind in rural areas through education and integration into the community.

== Programs ==
To achieve its objectives, UMAV is implementing the following programs:

- A program for the prevention of blindness.
- A special education program for integration of blind children.
- A program for socio-economic integration of the blind in urban areas.
- A program for socio-economic integration of the blind in rural areas.

== Difficulties encountered ==
- Insufficient materials.
- Payment of water, electricity and telephone bills.
- Maintenance of computer hardware and other equipment for education and logistics.
- Contaminated water.

== Partner organisations ==
- Sightsavers
- Rotary Club
- Lion’s Club
- International Citizen Service
- l’Institut Montéclair
- Le Fonds de Solidarité Nationale
- la Mutualité de l’Anjou la Mayenne
- Libre Vue
