= Commune I, Bamako =

Commune I
- Commune
- Interactive map of Commune I
- Coordinates: 12.66°N 7.94°W
- Country: Mali
- Region: Bamako Capital District
- Cercle: Bamako

Government
  - Mayor: Oumarou Togo
- Time zone: UTC (Coordinated Universal Time)

Commune I is a commune of Bamako, Mali.
