= Commune IV, Bamako =

Commune IV
- Commune
- Interactive map of Commune IV
- Coordinates: 12°37′48″N 8°01′38″W
- Country: Mali
- Region: Bamako Capital District
- Cercle: Bamako
- Time zone: UTC (Coordinated Universal Time)

Commune IV is a commune of Bamako, Mali.
