= Martyrs Bridge (Bamako) =

Bridge in Bamako, Mali

Coordinates: 12°37′49″N 7°59′31″W

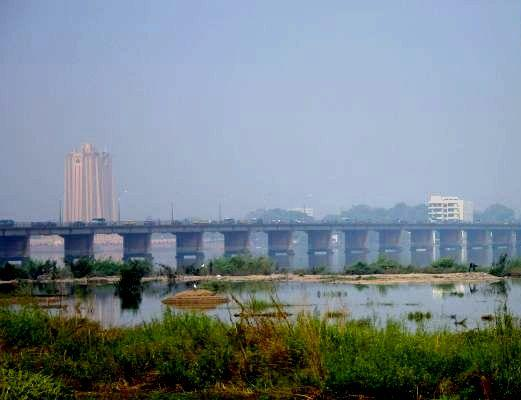
Looking North over the Niger River, BCEAO Tower in the background and the Martyrs Bridge in the foreground.

The Martyrs Bridge (Pont des martyrs) of Bamako, Mali connects the older sections of the city to its suburbs on the south shore of the Niger River. One of three road bridges across the Niger at Bamako, it is also known as the "Old Bridge". Opened in 1957 when Mali was under French colonial rule, it was renamed the Martyrs Bridge in 1991 following the deaths of protesters against the rule of Moussa Traoré. Martyrs Bridge connects two of the main avenues of the city. Avenue Fleuve (also known as Avenue Modibo Keita), a broad boulevard enclosing the Square Lamumba which runs north towards the Presidential palace. From the south of the bridge runs Avenue de l'Unite Africain, the major route from the city centre south to Bamako-Senou Airport.

== Other crossings ==
In 1982 a second road bridge, the King Fahd Bridge, was opened just 500 meters upstream. Both bridges connect the central city neighborhood of Commune III with Badalabougou.

Prior to the 1950s, the only crossing of the Niger at Bamako was at the Sotuba Causeway, 8 kilometers downstream from the city, which is a low water crossing of cut stone at the location of a natural rapids. The next all season crossing downstream is at the Markala Dam, over 200 kilometers east northeast past Segou, which until recently relied on ferry transport to cross one arm of the Niger. The next road bridge to cross the Niger river downstream of Markala is at Gao, Mali. A Chinese funded third road bridge, downstream on the east end of Bamako, is in the planning stage.
