= Commune VI, Bamako =

Commune VI
- Commune
- Interactive map of Commune VI
- Coordinates: 12.57°N 7.94°W
- Country: Mali
- Region: Bamako Capital District
- Cercle: Bamako
- Time zone: UTC (Coordinated Universal Time)

Commune VI is a commune of Bamako, Mali.
