= Commune V, Bamako =

Commune V
- Commune
- Interactive map of Commune V
- Coordinates: 12.58°N 8.00°W
- Country: Mali
- Region: Bamako Capital District
- Cercle: Bamako

Government
  - Mayor: Amadou Ouattara
- Time zone: UTC (Coordinated Universal Time)

Commune V is a commune of Bamako, Mali.

== Notable people ==
- Coulibaly Alima Diarra : Community Leader
