= Commune II, Bamako =

Commune II
- Commune
- Interactive map of Commune II
- Coordinates: 12.64°N 7.97°W
- Country: Mali
- Region: Bamako Capital District
- Cercle: Bamako
- Time zone: UTC (Coordinated Universal Time)

Commune II is a commune of Bamako, Mali.
