= BCEAO Tower (Bamako) =

High-rise building in Bamako, Mali

Coordinates: 12.632696°N 7.9985°W

BCEAO tower, Bamako, Mali.

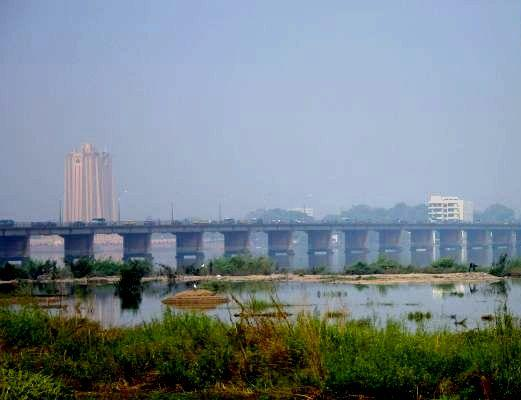
The BCEAO Tower (left) viewed from across the Niger River

The BCEAO Tower (fr. Tour de la BCEAO) is a building in Bamako, Mali. At 20 stories and 80m (262ft) high, it is the tallest building in the West African nation. It sits on the north ("right→") bank of the Niger River in the center of the City of Bamako.

== Architecture ==
Classified as Neo-Sudanic architecture, the tower is modeled on the Sudano-Sahelian architecture of the famous Mosques of Djenné and Timbuktu. The building, dull orange in colour, matches the traditional banco architecture of West Africa, as well as that of the soil in the surrounding area. Its tapered shape resembles a termite hill from a distance. The distinctive "horns" (or "bat ears") on the building's top, and its deeply incised, vertically variegated facade are typical decorative elements of Sahelian architecture, found on buildings such as the Great Mosque of Djenné, and strongly resembling the 1923 Bamako Market building.

== Owner ==
The BCEAO Tower is the Malian headquarters of the Central Bank of West African States, whose acronym in French is BCEAO and which provides development banking and government financial and currency services in several Francophone West African nations.

== Location in Bamako ==
The building is located in the busy Commune III neighbourhood, where "Avenue Moussa Tavele" meets the waterside boulevard between the two main Bamako bridges: King Fahd Bridge a block west, and Martyrs Bridge three blocks east. Just to the east of the BCEAO complex, a park and formal garden mark where the diagonally running "Boulevard du Peuple" reaches the river. By contrast, small market gardens and launching points or river canoes line the edges of the river. With the Hotel de l'Amitié and the Grande Mosquée, the BCEAO Tower is one of three landmarks visible across most of the city.

== See also ==
- BCEAO Tower (Cotonou)
