= National Museum of Mali =

Museum in Bamako, Mali

Musée National du Mali
- The Musee National buildings
- Established: 14 February 1953; 73 years ago
- Location: Bamako, Mali
- Coordinates: 12°39′31″N 7°59′57″W
- Type: Malian culture and history
- Director: Dr. Samuel Sidibé
- Architect: Jean-Loup Pivin
- Website: https://musee-national-mali.org/

The National Museum of Malí (French: Musée national du Mali) is an archaeological and anthropological museum located in Bamako, the capital of Mali. It presents permanent and temporary exhibits on the history of Mali, as well as the musical instruments, dress, and ritual objects associated with Mali's various ethnic groups.

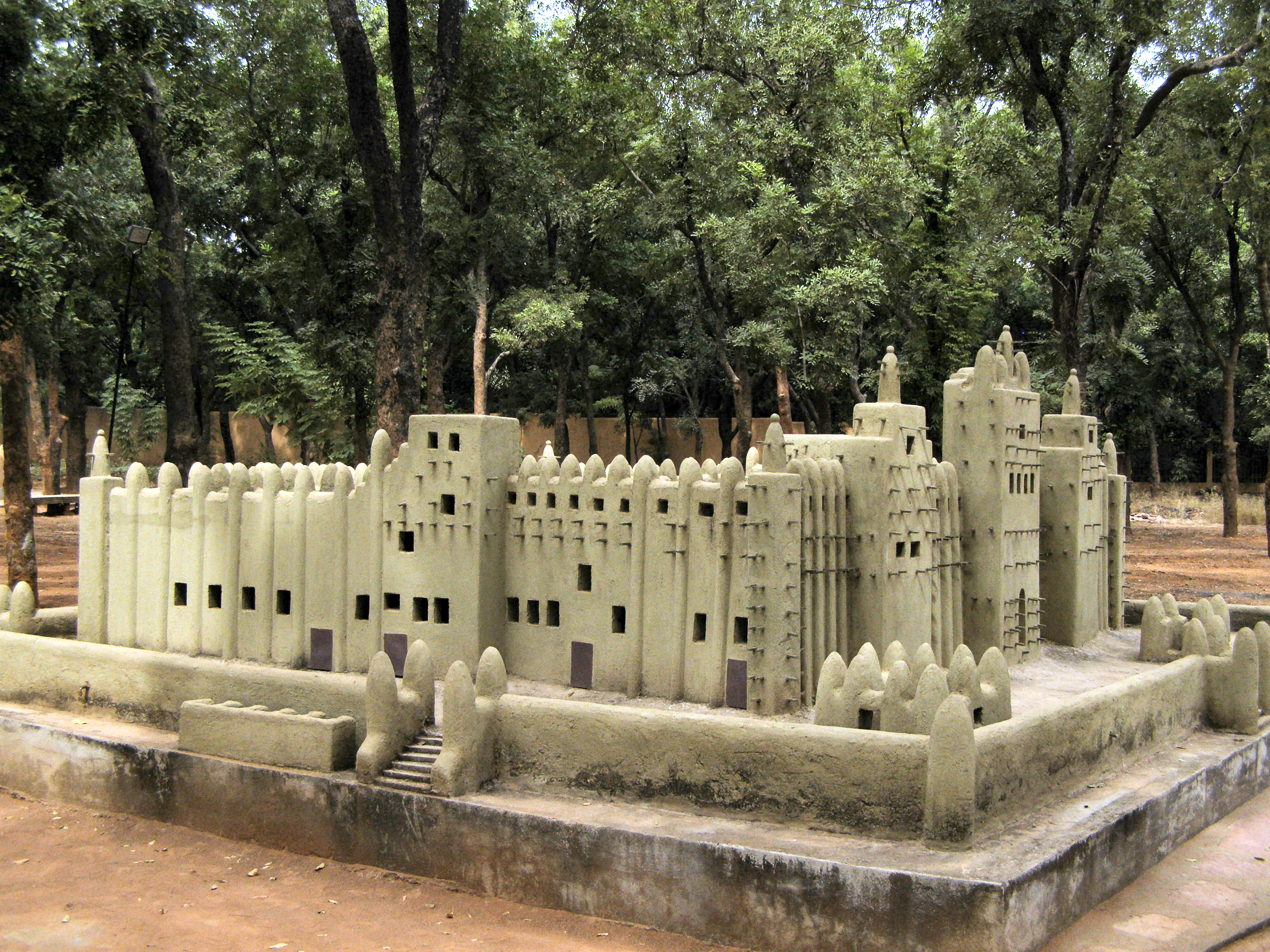
Concrete model of the Great Mosque of Djenné

Concrete models of several important cultural landmarks, such as the mosques of Djenné and Timbuktu are displayed outside on the grounds of the museum.

== History ==
The National Museum began under French colonial rule as the Sudanese Museum, part of the Institut Français d’Afrique Noire (IFAN) under Théodore Monod. It was opened on February 14, 1953, under the direction of Ukrainian archaeologist Y. Shumowskyi. Archaeologist Y. Shumovskyi had worked in the museum for nine years, gathering a significant portion (nearly 3000) of the holdings.

With the independence of the Republic of Mali in 1960, the Sudanese Museum became the National Museum of Mali, with the new objectives of promoting national unity and celebrating Malian traditional culture. However, lack of financial means and absence of qualified personnel caused some deterioration in the museum's collections.

== New location and funding ==
On March 30, 1956, the National Museum moved into a new cemented structure, created by architect Jean-Loup Pivin from traditional Malian designs. Since the 1992 election of former archaeologist Alpha Oumar Konaré to Mali's presidency, the museum's funding has increased considerably, leaving it among the best in West Africa.

The museum often hosts part of African Photography Encounters, a biannual photography activity.

== Collaboration with the Aga Khan Trust for Culture ==
In June 2006, Samuel Sidibé, the director of the National Museum of Mali, signed an agreement of collaboration with the Aga Khan Trust for Culture (AKTC). The agreement provided the museum with a new information technology system, and an improvement of the conservation facilities of its collections. It built on a memorandum of cooperation between the Ministry of Culture of Mali and the trust, relating to the conservation of earth architecture.

The agreement sets out a plan for the AKTC's Museums Project unit to support and work with the National Museum of Mali. A digital database of the museum's collections and digital archive of images and sounds will be created, with technical equipment, software and training to be provided by the trust. In addition, the reserve collections of archaeology and textiles will be reorganized, with support to be provided for the construction of a new building for conservation and restoration work. Containers specially designed for classifying, storing and conserving archaeological artefacts will be installed in the museum's storage areas, while the textiles storage area will also receive new equipment which meets international standards for conserving precious materials. The work is to be carried out through a joint collaboration between the museum and the AKTC.

== Collections ==
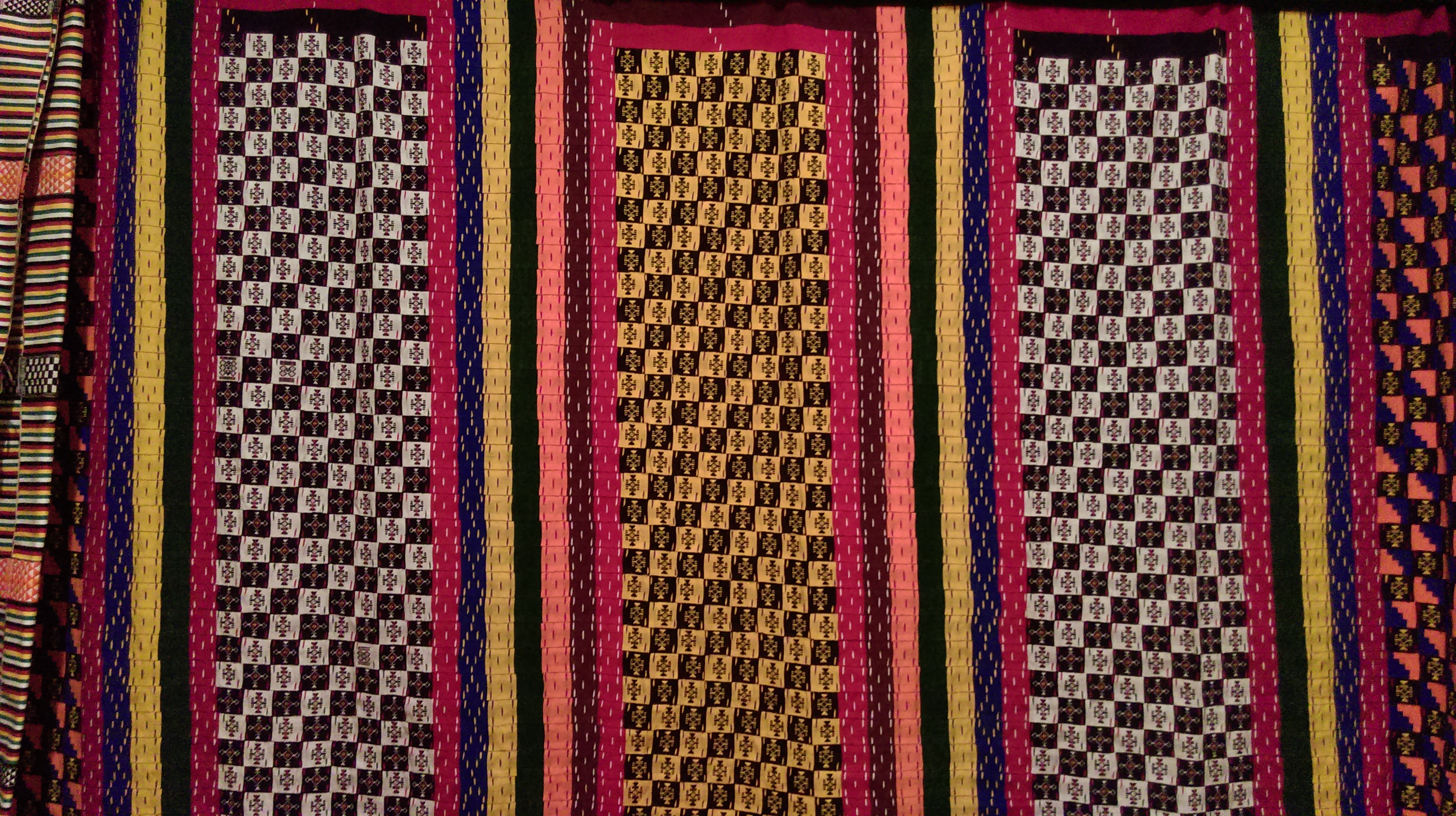
Textile collection

The National Museum of Mali has a large collection of 10,000 objects: mostly ethnographic, archeological or West African art objects. This collection is enriched by 40,000 photographs in black and white, 12,000 negatives, 500 audio recordings and 300 video recordings. The Collective for the National Museum of Mali aims to promote the digital presence of the museum and to mitigate risks induced by the COVID-19 crisis that could endanger the collections.

== Notes ==
1. Velton 101.
