= Commune III, Bamako =

Commune III
- Commune
- Interactive map of Commune III
- Country: Mali
- Region: Bamako Capital District
- Cercle: Bamako

Government
  - Mayor: Djiré Mariame Diallo
- Time zone: UTC (Coordinated Universal Time)

Commune III is a commune of Bamako, Mali.
