= Yuriy Shumovskyi =

Ukrainian archaeologist and priest

Yuriy Shumovskyi (Ukrainian: Юрій Шумовський) was a famous Ukrainian archaeologist and priest. Sudan researcher. He was born in 1908 in the village of Myrohoshcha, Dubno district, Volhynian Governorate, Russian Empire (now Ukraine).
