= King Fahd Bridge =

Bridge in Bamako, Mali

Coordinates: 12°37′25.0″N 8°0′17.2″W

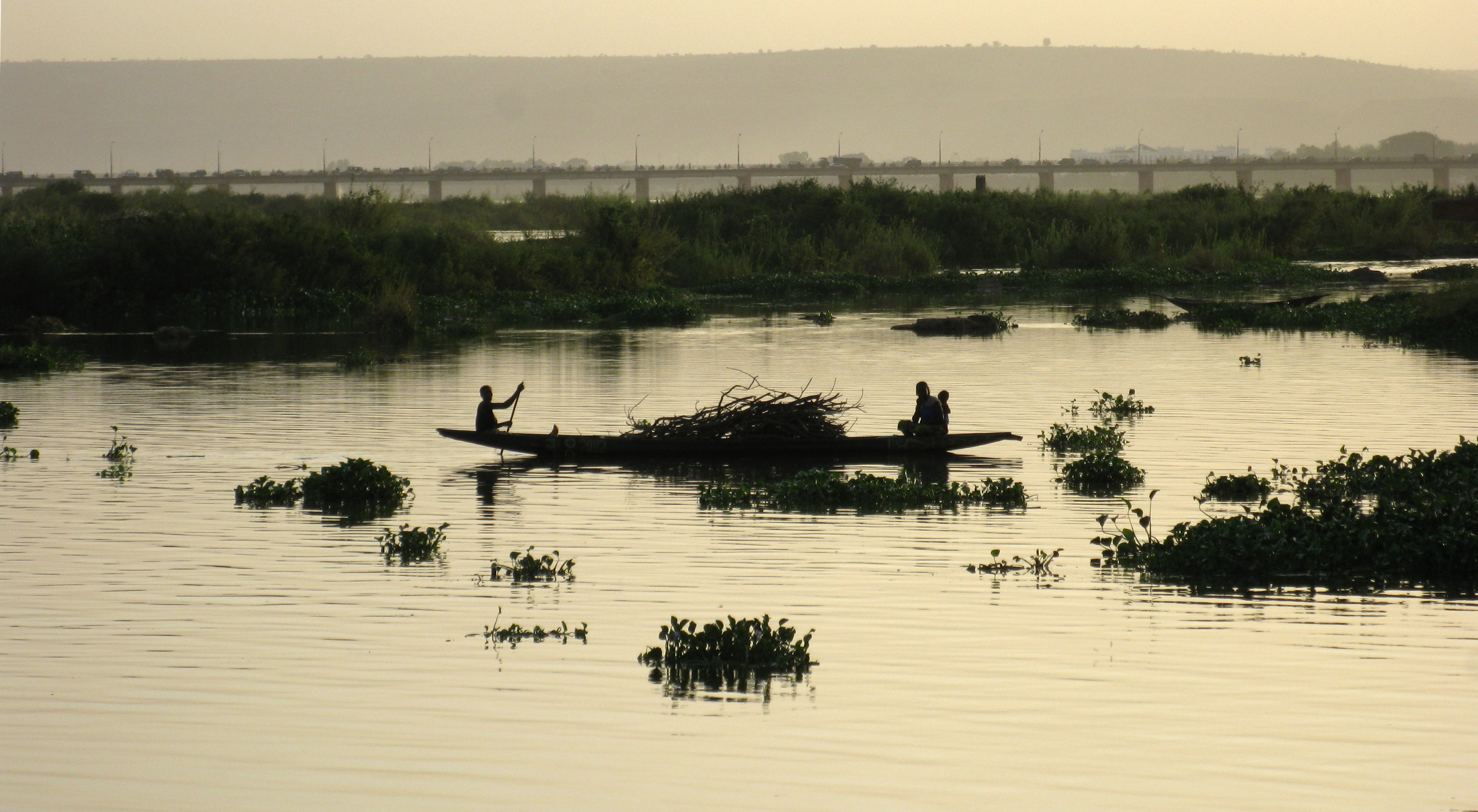
King Fahd Bridge (2009)

The King Fahd Bridge (Pont Roi Fahd) of Bamako, Mali connects the older sections of the Malian capital to its broad suburbs on the south shore of the Niger River.

One of three road bridges across the Niger at Bamako, it is also known as the "New Bridge". Opened in 1992 with funding from the Saudi Fund for Development, it was named for Fahd of Saudi Arabia. 500 meters downstream (east) lies Bamako's first bridge, built in 1957 under French Colonial rule, renamed the Martyrs Bridge. Both bridges connect the central city neighborhood of Commune III with Badalabougou. The Avenue de la CDEAO passes over the King Fahd Bridge. Prior to the 1950s, the only crossing of the Niger at Bamako was at the Sotuba Causeway, 8 kilometers downstream from the city, which is a low water crossing of cut stone at the location of a natural rapids. The next all season crossing downstream is at the Markala Dam, over 200 kilometers east northeast past Segou, which until recently relied on ferry transport to cross one arm of the Niger. The next road bridge to cross the Niger river downstream of Markala is at Gao, Mali. The Pont de l’amitié sino-malienne, a Chinese funded third road bridge, downstream on the east end of Bamako, has been completed in 2011.

== See also ==
- List of things named after Saudi kings
