= List of airports by ICAO code: G =

List of airports by ICAO code: A - B - C - D - EB-EG - EH-EY - FA-FM - FN-FZ - G - H - ~~I~~ - J - KA-KH - KI-KP - KR-KZ - LA-LJ - LK-LZ - M - N - O - P - Q - R - SA-SC - SD-SH - SI - SJ - SK-SM - SN-SP - SQ - SS-SU - SV-SY - T - U - V - W - ~~X~~ - YA-YG - YH-YQ - YR-YZ - Z

== GA – Mali ==
Also see airport category and list.

ICAO	IATA	Airport name	Community	Coordinates	Notes
GAAO		Ansongo Airport	Ansongo	15°42′02″N 000°29′38″E	
GABD		Bandiagara Airport	Bandiagara	14°20′10″N 003°36′35″W	
GABF		Bafoulabe Airport	Bafoulabe	13°48′25″N 010°50′50″W	
GABG		Bougouni Airport	Bougouni	11°26′25″N 007°30′30″W	
GABR		Bourem Airport	Bourem	17°01′34″N 000°24′23″W	
GABS	BKO	Modibo Keita International Airport	Bamako	12°32′16″N 007°56′35″W	
GADA		Dioïla Airport	Dioïla	12°30′00″N 006°48′00″W	Closed
GADZ		Douentza Airport	Douentza	15°00′15″N 002°55′05″W	
GAGM	GUD	Faladié Airport	Faladié	13°09′00″N 008°20′00″W	Closed
GAGM	GUD	Goundam Airport	Goundam	16°21′30″N 003°36′15″W	
GAGO	GAQ	Gao International Airport (Korogoussou Airport)	Gao	16°14′54″N 000°00′20″E	
GAKA	KNZ	Kéniéba Airport	Kéniéba	12°50′21″N 011°15′10″W	
GAKL		Kidal Airport	Kidal	18°26′05″N 001°25′25″E	
GAKM		Ke Macina Airport	Ke Macina	13°58′00″N 005°23′00″W	Closed
GAKN		Kolokani Airport	Kolokani	13°31′25″N 008°02′45″W	
GAKO	KTX	Koutiala Airport	Koutiala	12°21′03″N 005°25′50″W	
GAKT		Kita Airport	Kita	13°04′00″N 009°29′00″W	Closed
GAKY		Kayes Dag-Dag Airport	Kayes	14°28′54″N 011°24′07″W	
GAMA		Markala Airport	Markala	13°41′44″N 006°03′55″W	Closed
GAMB	MZI	Mopti Airport (Ambodedjo Airport)	Mopti	14°30′46″N 004°04′46″W	
GAMK		Menaka Airport	Ménaka, Ménaka Cercle	15°55′45″N 002°20′50″E	
GAMN		Bengassi Airport	Manantali	13°15′20″N 010°30′15″W	
GANF		Niafunke Airport	Niafunké	15°55′25″N 004°00′25″W	
GANK	NRM	Keibane Airport	Nara	15°13′40″N 007°15′40″W	
GANR	NIX	Nioro Airport	Nioro	15°14′20″N 009°34′35″W	
GASK	KSS	Sikasso Airport	Sikasso	11°19′35″N 005°41′30″W	
GASO		Dingangan Airport	Sikasso	11°35′54″N 005°47′56″W	
GATB	TOM	Tombouctou Airport	Tombouctou	16°43′50″N 003°00′27″W	
GATS		Tessalit Airport	Tessalit	20°14′45″N 000°58′50″E	
GAYE	EYL	Yelimane Airport	Yélimané	15°07′25″N 010°34′05″W	

== GB – The Gambia ==
Also see airport category and list.

- GBYD (BJL) – Banjul International Airport (Yundum Int'l) – Banjul – 13°20′17″N 016°39′08″W

== GC – Canary Islands (Spain) ==
Also see airport category (Canary Islands) and list (Spain).

ICAO	IATA	Airport name	Community	Coordinates
GCFV	FUE	Fuerteventura Airport	Fuerteventura	28°27′10″N 013°51′50″W
GCGM	GMZ	La Gomera Airport	La Gomera	28°01′47″N 017°12′53″W
GCGO		San Sebastián de la Gomera Heliport	San Sebastián de la Gomera	28°05′50″N 017°06′09″W
GCHI	VDE	El Hierro Airport	El Hierro	27°48′53″N 017°53′13″W
GCHU		Hospital Universitario de Canarias Heliport	Santa Cruz de Tenerife	28°27′22″N 016°17′31″W
GCLA	SPC	La Palma Airport	La Palma	28°37′35″N 017°45′20″W
GCLB		El Berriel Airport	Gran Canaria	27°46′57″N 015°30′26″W
GCLP	LPA	Gran Canaria Airport	Las Palmas	27°55′55″N 015°23′12″W
GCRR	ACE	Lanzarote Airport	Arrecife, Lanzarote	28°56′44″N 013°36′19″W
GCTS	TFS	Tenerife South Airport	Santa Cruz de Tenerife	28°02′40″N 016°34′21″W
GCXO	TFN	Tenerife North Airport	Tenerife	28°28′58″N 016°20′30″W

== GE – Ceuta and Melilla (Spain) ==
Also see airport category and list.

ICAO	IATA	Airport name	Community	Coordinates
GECE	JCU	Ceuta Heliport	Ceuta	35°53′33″N 005°18′21″W
GEML	MLN	Melilla Airport	Melilla	35°16′47″N 002°57′23″W

== GF – Sierra Leone ==
Also see airport category and list.

ICAO	IATA	Airport name	Community	Coordinates	Notes
GFBN	BTE	Sherbro International Airport	Bonthe	07°31′55″N 012°31′06″W	
GFBO	KBS	Bo Airport	Bo	07°56′38″N 011°45′42″W	
GFCK		Cockerill Barracks Heliport	Freetown	08°28′27″N 013°16′40″W	
GFGK	GBK	Gbangbatoke Airport	Gbangbatoke	07°48′45″N 012°22′40″W	
GFHA	HGS	Hastings Airport	Freetown	08°23′40″N 013°07′42″W	
GFKB	KBA	Kabala Airport	Kabala	09°38′20″N 011°30′55″W	
GFKE	KEN	Kenema Airport	Kenema	07°53′50″N 011°10′25″W	
GFLL	FNA	Lungi International Airport	Freetown	08°36′59″N 013°11′44″W	
GFTO		Tongo Airport	Tongo	08°13′01″N 011°04′01″W	Closed
GFYE	WYE	Yengema Airport	Yengema	08°36′55″N 011°02′50″W	

== GG – Guinea-Bissau ==
Also see airport category and list.

ICAO	IATA	Airport name	Community	Coordinates
GGBF		Bafatá Airport	Bafatá	12°10′35″N 014°39′30″W
GGBU	BQE	Bubaque Airport	Bubaque	11°18′00″N 015°50′20″W
GGCF		Cufar Airport	Cufar	11°17′17″N 015°10′50″W
GGGB		Nova Lamego Airport	Nova Lamego	12°17′30″N 014°14′10″W
GGOV	OXB	Osvaldo Vieira International Airport	Bissau	11°53′41″N 015°39′13″W

== GL – Liberia ==
Also see airport category and list.

ICAO	IATA	Airport name	Community	Coordinates	Notes
GLBU	UCN	Buchanan Airport	Buchanan	05°54′15″N 010°03′30″W	
GLCM		Cape Mount Airport	Robertsport	06°45′18″N 011°21′19″W	Closed
GLCP	CPA	Cape Palmas Airport	Harper	04°22′45″N 007°41′48″W	
GLGE	SNI	Greenville/Sinoe Airport	Greenville	05°02′04″N 009°04′00″W	
GLLB		Lamco Airport	Buchanan	05°51′28″N 010°01′12″W	
GLMR	MLW	Spriggs Payne Airport	Monrovia	06°17′21″N 010°45′31″W	
GLNA	NIA	Nimba Airport	Nimba	07°29′30″N 008°35′00″W	
GLRB	ROB	Roberts International Airport	Monrovia	06°14′02″N 010°21′44″W	
GLST	SAZ	Sasstown Airport	Sasstown	04°40′54″N 008°26′04″W	
GLTN	THC	Tchien Airport	Tchien	06°03′00″N 008°08′20″W	
GLVA	VOI	Voinjama Airport	Voinjama	08°19′40″N 009°46′05″W	

== GM – Morocco ==
Also see airport category and list.

ICAO	IATA	Airport name	Community	Coordinates	Notes
GMAA		Inezgane Airport	Agadir, Souss-Massa-Drâa	30°22′52″N 009°32′46″W	
GMAD	AGA	Al Massira Airport	Agadir, Souss-Massa-Drâa	30°19′30″N 009°24′47″W	
GMAG	GLN	Guelmim Airport	Guelmim, Guelmim-Es Semara	29°01′00″N 010°04′04″W	
GMAT	TTA	Tan Tan Airport (Plage Blanche Airport)	Tan-Tan, Guelmim-Es Semara	28°26′54″N 011°09′41″W	
GMAZ	OZG	Zagora Airport	Zagora, Souss-Massa-Drâa	30°16′00″N 005°51′26″W	
GMFA		Ouezzane Airport	Ouezzane, Gharb-Chrarda-Béni Hssen	34°47′35″N 005°38′02″W	
GMFB	UAR	Bouarfa Airport	Bouarfa, Oriental	32°30′52″N 001°58′42″W	
GMFF	FEZ	Saïss Airport	Fez, Fès-Boulemane	33°55′38″N 004°58′41″W	
GMFI		Ifrane Airport	Ifrane, Meknès-Tafilalet	33°30′19″N 005°09′10″W	
GMFK	ERH	Moulay Ali Cherif Airport	Errachidia, Meknès-Tafilalet	31°56′51″N 004°23′54″W	
GMFM	MEK	Bassatine Air Base (Second Royal Air Force Base)	Meknes, Meknès-Tafilalet	33°52′45″N 005°30′54″W	
GMFN		Taouima Nador Airport	Nador, Oriental	35°09′00″N 002°55′00″W	Closed
GMFO	OUD	Angads Airport	Oujda, Oriental	34°47′14″N 001°55′26″W	
GMFU		Sefrou Airport	Fez, Fès-Boulemane	34°00′20″N 004°57′56″W	Closed
GMFZ		Taza Airport	Taza, Taza-Al Hoceima-Taounate	34°13′55″N 003°57′00″W	
GMMA	SMW	Smara Airport	Smara, Laâyoune-Sakia El Hamra	26°43′54″N 011°41′04″W	Also GSMA
GMMB	GMD	Ben Slimane Airport	Ben Slimane, Chaouia-Ouardigha	33°39′20″N 007°13′17″W	
GMMC	CAS	Anfa Airport	Casablanca, Greater Casablanca	33°33′25″N 007°39′38″W	Closed
GMMD		Beni Mellal Airport	Beni Mellal, Tadla-Azilal	32°24′00″N 006°19′00″W	
GMME	RBA	Rabat-Salé Airport (First Royal Air Force Base)	Rabat / Salé, Rabat-Salé-Zemmour-Zaer	34°03′05″N 006°45′05″W	
GMMF	SII	Sidi Ifni Airport	Sidi Ifni, Souss-Massa-Drâa	29°22′08″N 010°10′49″W	Closed
GMMG		Ben Guerir Air Base	Ben Guerir, Rehamna	32°07′50″N 007°54′39″W	
GMMH	VIL	Dakhla Airport	Dakhla, Dakhla-Oued Ed-Dahab	23°43′05″N 015°55′55″W	Also GSVO
GMMI	ESU	Mogador Airport	Essaouira, Marrakesh-Tensift-El Haouz	31°23′51″N 009°40′54″W	
GMMJ		El Jadida Airport	El Jadida, Doukkala-Abda	33°14′00″N 008°31′15″W	
GMMK		Khouribga Military Airport	Khouribga, Béni Mellal-Khénifra	32°51′29″N 006°57′11″W	
GMML	EUN	Hassan I Airport	Laayoune	27°09′06″N 013°13′09″W	Also GSAI
GMMN	CMN	Mohammed V International Airport	Casablanca, Greater Casablanca	33°22′02″N 007°35′23″W	
GMMO		Taroudannt Airport	Taroudannt, Souss-Massa-Drâa	30°30′09″N 008°49′25″W	
GMMS		Safi Airport	Safi, Doukkala-Abda	32°16′23″N 009°14′13″W	Closed
GMMT		Tit Mellil Airport	Casablanca, Greater Casablanca	33°35′40″N 007°27′50″W	
GMMW	NDR	Nador Airport (Al Aroui Airport)	Nador, Oriental	34°59′20″N 003°01′42″W	
GMMX	RAK	Marrakesh Menara Airport	Marrakesh, Marrakesh-Tensift-El Haouz	31°36′25″N 008°02′11″W	
GMMY	NNA	Kenitra Air Base (Third Royal Air Force Base)	Kenitra, Gharb-Chrarda-Béni Hssen	34°17′56″N 006°35′45″W	
GMMZ	OZZ	Ouarzazate Airport	Ouarzazate, Souss-Massa-Drâa	30°56′21″N 006°54′34″W	
GMSL		Sidi Slimane Air Base (Fifth Royal Air Force Base)	Sidi Slimane, Gharb-Chrarda-Béni Hssen	34°13′50″N 006°03′01″W	
GMTA	AHU	Cherif Al Idrissi Airport	Al Hoceima, Taza-Al Hoceima-Taounate	35°10′37″N 003°50′22″W	
GMTN	TTU	Sania Ramel Airport	Tétouan, Tangier-Tétouan	35°35′40″N 005°19′12″W	
GMTT	TNG	Ibn Battouta Airport	Tangier, Tangier-Tétouan	35°43′37″N 005°55′01″W	

== GO – Senegal ==
Also see airport category and list.

ICAO	IATA	Airport name	Community	Coordinates	Notes
GOBD	DSS	Blaise Diagne International Airport	Dakar	14°40′16″N 017°04′01″W	
GODK	KDA	Kolda North Airport	Kolda	12°53′54″N 014°58′05″W	Formerly GOGK
GOGG	ZIG	Ziguinchor Airport	Ziguinchor	12°33′20″N 016°16′54″W	
GOGS	CSK	Cap Skiring Airport	Cap Skiring	12°24′36″N 016°44′46″W	
GOOD		Diourbel Airport	Diourbel	14°39′00″N 016°14′00″W	Closed
GOOG		Linguère Airport	Linguère	15°24′00″N 015°05′02″W	
GOOK	KLC	Kaolack Airport	Kaolack	14°08′48″N 016°03′04″W	
GOOY	DKR	Léopold Sédar Senghor International Airport	Dakar	14°44′22″N 017°29′24″W	
GOSM	MAX	Ouro Sogui Airport	Matam	15°35′37″N 013°19′22″W	
GOSP	POD	Podor Airport	Podor	16°40′41″N 014°57′54″W	
GOSR	RDT	Richard Toll Airport	Richard Toll	16°26′15″N 015°39′26″W	
GOSS	XLS	Saint-Louis Airport	Saint-Louis	16°03′03″N 016°27′47″W	
GOTB	BXE	Bakel Airport	Bakel	14°50′50″N 012°28′05″W	
GOTK	KGG	Kédougou Airport	Kédougou	12°34′20″N 012°13′13″W	
GOTN	NIK	Niokolo-Koba Airport	Niokolo-Koba	13°03′09″N 012°43′38″W	
GOTS	SMY	Simenti Airport	Simenti	13°02′48″N 013°17′41″W	
GOTT	TUD	Tambacounda Airport	Tambacounda	13°44′12″N 013°39′11″W	

== GQ – Mauritania ==
Also see airport category and list.

ICAO	IATA	Airport name	Community	Coordinates	Notes
GQNA	AEO	Aioun el Atrouss Airport	Aioun el Atrouss	16°42′40″N 009°38′16″W	
GQNB	OTL	Boutilimit Airport	Boutilimit	17°32′10″N 014°40′10″W	
GQNC	THI	Tichitt Airport	Tichitt	18°26′00″N 009°29′00″W	
GQND	TIY	Tidjikja Airport	Tidjikja	18°34′12″N 011°25′24″W	
GQNE	BGH	Abbaye Airport	Boghé	16°38′10″N 014°11′25″W	
GQNF	KFA	Kiffa Airport	Kiffa	16°35′23″N 011°24′22″W	
GQNH	TMD	Timbedra Airport	Timbedra	16°14′01″N 008°09′48″W	Closed
GQNI	EMN	Nema Airport	Néma	16°37′19″N 007°18′59″W	
GQNJ	AJJ	Akjoujt Airport	Akjoujt	19°43′40″N 014°22′40″W	
GQNK	KED	Kaedi Airport	Kaédi	16°09′34″N 013°30′27″W	
GQNL		Letfotar Airport	Moudjeria	17°45′00″N 012°30′00″W	Closed
GQNM		Dahara Airport	Timbedra	16°18′00″N 008°03′00″W	Closed
GQNN	NKC	Nouakchott International Airport	Nouakchott	18°05′43″N 015°56′58″W	Closed
GQNO	NKC	Nouakchott-Oumtounsy International Airport	Nouakchott	18°18′36″N 015°58′11″W	
GQNS	SEY	Sélibaby Airport	Sélibaby	15°10′46″N 012°12′26″W	
GQNT	THT	Tamchakett Airport	Tamchakett	17°13′54″N 010°46′45″W	
GQPA	ATR	Atar International Airport	Atar	20°30′24″N 013°02′35″W	
GQPC		Chinguetti Airport	Chinguetti	20°29′00″N 012°23′00″W	Closed
GQPF	FGD	Fderik Airport	Fderik	22°40′20″N 012°43′50″W	
GQPP	NDB	Nouadhibou International Airport	Nouadhibou	20°55′59″N 017°01′47″W	
GQPT		Bir Moghrein Airport	Bir Moghrein	25°14′12″N 011°35′19″W	
GQPZ	OUZ	Tazadit Airport	Zouérat	22°45′25″N 012°29′00″W	

== GS – Western Sahara ==
Note: These airports now also have ICAO codes starting with GM.

- GSAI (EUN) – Hassan I Airport (El Aaiún Airport) – El Aaiún (Laâyoune) (also see GMML)
- GSMA (SMW) – Smara Airport – Smara (also see GMMA)
- GSVO (VIL) – Dakhla Airport – Dakhla (Villa Cisneros) (also see GMMH)

== GU – Guinea ==
Also see airport category and list.

ICAO	IATA	Airport name	Community	Coordinates
GUBE		Beyla Airport	Beyla	08°41′50″N 008°42′50″W
GUCY	CKY	Ahmed Sékou Touré International Airport (Gbessia Int'l)	Conakry	09°34′37″N 013°36′43″W
GUFA	FIG	Fria Airport	Fria	10°21′02″N 013°34′09″W
GUFH	FAA	Faranah Airport	Faranah	10°02′10″N 010°46′15″W
GUGO		Gbenko Airport	Banankoro	09°14′30″N 009°17′50″W
GUKR		Kawass Airport	Port Kamsar	10°39′25″N 014°32′00″W
GUKU	KSI	Kissidougou Airport	Kissidougou	09°09′40″N 010°07′30″W
GULB	LEK	Tata Airport	Labe	11°20′15″N 012°17′25″W
GUMA	MCA	Macenta Airport	Macenta	08°28′55″N 009°31′30″W
GUNZ	NZE	Nzérékoré Airport	N'zerekore	07°48′50″N 008°42′10″W
GUOK	BKJ	Boké Baralande Airport	Boké	10°58′00″N 014°16′50″W
GUSA		Sangarédi Airport	Sangarédi	11°06′55″N 013°48′55″W
GUSB	SBI	Sambailo Airport	Koundara	12°34′30″N 013°21′45″W
GUSI	GII	Siguiri Airport	Siguiri	11°24′00″N 009°11′15″W
GUXD	KNN	Kankan Airport	Kankan	10°26′55″N 009°13′30″W

== GV – Cape Verde ==
Also see airport category and list.

ICAO	IATA	Airport name	Community	Coordinates	Notes
GVAC	SID	Amílcar Cabral International Airport	Espargos, Sal	16°44′32″N 022°56′56″W	
GVAN	NTO	Agostinho Neto Airport	Ponta do Sol, Santo Antão	17°12′11″N 025°05′27″W	Closed
GVBA	BVC	Aristides Pereira International Airport	Rabil, Boa Vista	16°08′11″N 022°53′20″W	
GVBR	BVR	Esperadinha Airport	Fajã de Água, Brava	14°51′52″N 024°44′46″W	Closed
GVFM		Francisco Mendes International Airport	Praia, Santiago	14°55′26″N 023°29′38″W	Closed
GVMA	MMO	Maio Airport	Vila do Maio, Maio	15°09′22″N 023°12′49″W	
GVMT	MTI	Mosteiros Airport	Mosteiros, Fogo	15°02′42″N 024°20′24″W	Closed
GVNP	RAI	Nelson Mandela International Airport	Praia, Santiago	14°56′29″N 023°29′05″W	Formerly GVPR
GVSF	SFL	São Filipe Airport	São Filipe, Fogo	14°53′07″N 024°28′49″W	
GVSN	SNE	São Nicolau Airport	Preguiça, São Nicolau	16°35′18″N 024°17′03″W	
GVSV	VXE	Cesária Évora Airport	São Pedro, São Vicente	16°50′00″N 025°03′20″W	
