= List of airports in Senegal =

This is a list of airports in Senegal, sorted by location.

== Airports ==
Airport names shown in bold indicate the airport has scheduled commercial airline service.

| City served | Region | ICAO | IATA | Airport name | Coordinates |
|---|---|---|---|---|---|
| Bakel | Tambacounda | GOTB | BXE | Bakel Airport | 14°50′50″N 012°28′05″W |
| Cap Skirring | Ziguinchor | GOGS | CSK | **Cap Skirring Airport** | 12°24′36″N 016°44′46″W |
| Dakar | Dakar | GOOY | DKR | Léopold Sédar Senghor International Airport | 14°44′22″N 017°29′24″W |
| Dakar | Thiès | GOBD | DSS | **Blaise Diagne International Airport** | 14°40′16″N 17°4′1″W |
| Dodji | Louga | GO66 | | Dodji Airport | 15°32′38″N 014°57′30″W |
| Kaolack | Kaolack | GOOK | KLC | Kaolack Airport | 14°08′48″N 016°03′04″W |
| Kédougou | Kédougou | GOTK | KGG | Kédougou Airport | 12°34′20″N 012°13′13″W |
| Kolda | Kolda | GODK | KDA | **Kolda North Airport** (former ICAO: GOGK) | 12°53′54″N 014°58′05″W |
| Linguère | Louga | GOOG | | Linguère Airport | 15°24′00″N 015°05′02″W |
| Matam | Matam | GOSM | MAX | Ouro Sogui Airport | 15°35′37″N 013°19′22″W |
| Niokolo-Koba | Niokolo-Koba National Park | GOTN | NIK | Niokolo-Koba Airport | 13°03′09″N 012°43′38″W |
| Podor | Saint-Louis | GOSP | POD | Podor Airport | 16°40′41″N 014°57′54″W |
| Richard Toll | Saint-Louis | GOSR | RDT | Richard Toll Airport | 16°26′15″N 015°39′26″W |
| Saint-Louis | Saint-Louis | GOSS | XLS | Saint-Louis Airport | 16°03′03″N 016°27′47″W |
| Simenti | Tambacounda | GOTS | SMY | Simenti Airport | 13°02′48″N 013°17′41″W |
| Tambacounda | Tambacounda | GOTT | TUD | Tambacounda Airport | 13°44′12″N 013°39′11″W |
| Ziguinchor | Ziguinchor | GOGG | ZIG | **Ziguinchor Airport** | 12°33′20″N 016°16′54″W |

=== Defunct airports ===
Former airports that once operated in Senegal

| City served | Region | ICAO | IATA | Airport name | Coordinates |
|---|---|---|---|---|---|
| Bignona | Ziguinchor | | | Bignona Airport | 12°47′40″N 16°13′47″W |
| Dakar | Dakar | | | Ouakam Airfield | 14°42′43″N 17°28′36″W |
| Diourbel | Diourbel | GOOD | | Diourbel Airport | 14°39′10″N 16°11′12″W |
| Kolda | Kolda | GOGK | | Kolda Airport | 12°52′47″N 14°57′22″W |
| Rufisque | Dakar | | | Eknes Airfield | 14°43′53″N 17°14′24″W |

== See also ==
- Transport in Senegal
- List of airports by ICAO code: G#GO - Senegal
- Wikipedia: WikiProject Aviation/Airline destination lists: Africa#Senegal
