= List of airports in Liberia =

This is a list of airports in Liberia, sorted by location.

== Airports ==
Airport names shown in bold indicate the airport has scheduled service on commercial airlines.

City served	ICAO	IATA	Airport name
Buchanan	GLBU	UCN	Buchanan Airport
Buchanan	GLLB		Lamco Airport
Harper (Cape Palmas)	GLCP	CPA	Cape Palmas Airport
Foya		FOY	Foya Airport
Greenville	GLGE	SNI	Greenville/Sinoe Airport
Harbel	GLRB	ROB	**Roberts International Airport**
Monrovia	GLMR	MLW	Spriggs Payne Airport
Nimba	GLNA	NIA	Nimba Airport
Sasstown	GLST	SAZ	Sasstown Airport
Tchien	GLTN	THC	Tchien Airport
Voinjama	GLVA	VOI	Voinjama Airport

== See also ==
- Transport in Liberia
- List of airports by ICAO code: G#GL - Liberia
- Wikipedia: WikiProject Aviation/Airline destination lists: Africa#Liberia
