= Transair (Senegal) =

Regional airline in Senegal

IATA	ICAO	Call sign
R2	GTS	TRANSGROUP
- Founded: 2010
- Hubs: Blaise Diagne International Airport
- Fleet size: 5
- Destinations: 12
- Headquarters: Dakar, Senegal
- Website: groupetransair.sn

Transair is a regional airline based in Senegal.

== Destinations ==
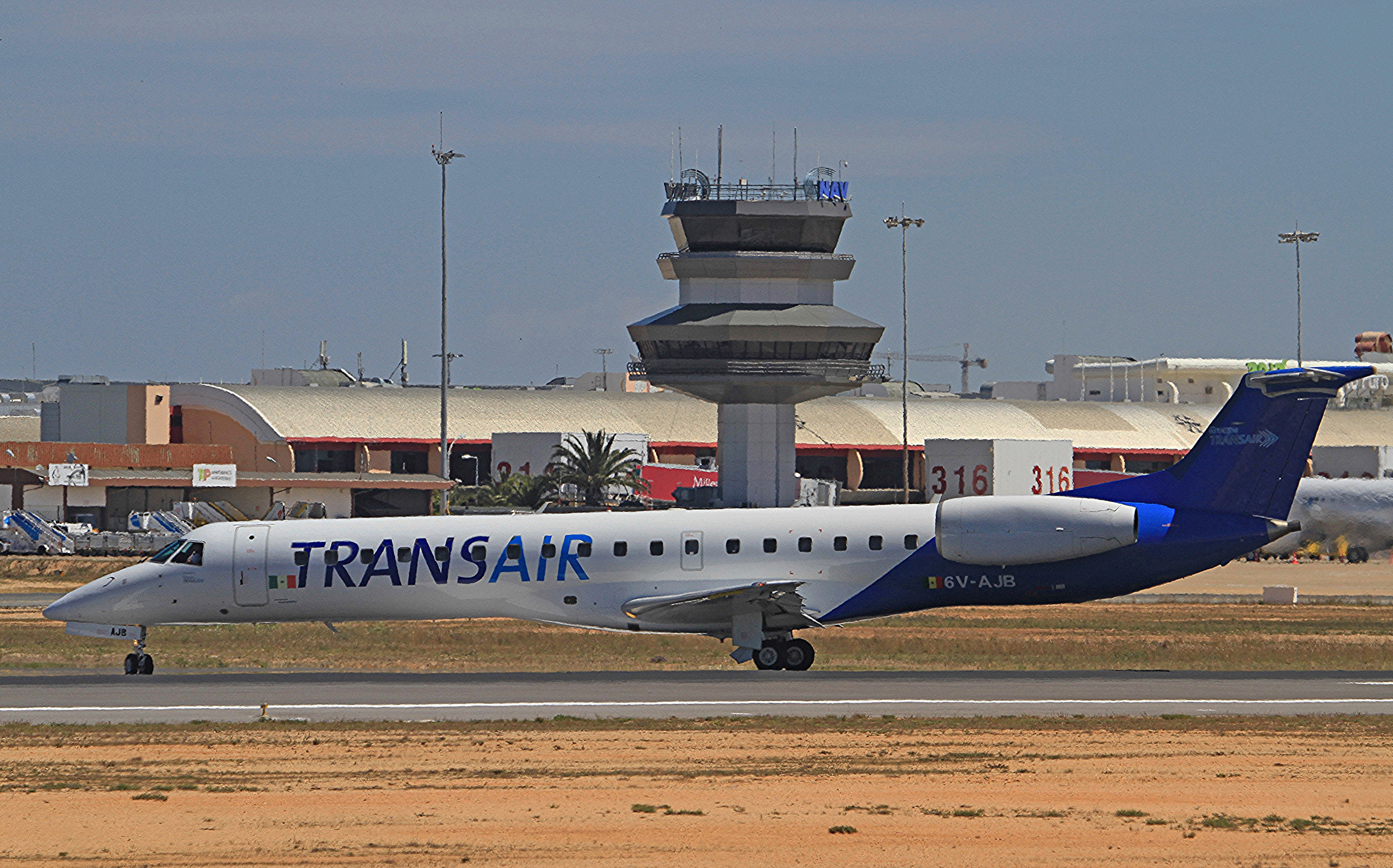
Transair Embraer ERJ-145 at Faro Airport in 2009.

As of December 2019, Transair operates flights to the following destinations:

Country	City	Airport	Notes	Refs
Cape Verde	Praia	Nelson Mandela International Airport		
Gambia	Banjul	Banjul International Airport		
Guinea	Conakry	Conakry Airport		
Guinea-Bissau	Bissau	Osvaldo Vieira International Airport		
Mauritania	Nouakchott	Nouakchott–Oumtounsy International Airport		
Senegal	Cap Skirring	Cap Skirring Airport		
Senegal	Dakar	Blaise Diagne International Airport	Hub	
Senegal	Kédougou	Kédougou Airport	Seasonal charter	
Senegal	Kolda	Kolda North Airport		
Senegal	Tambacounda	Tambacounda Airport	Seasonal charter	
Senegal	Ziguinchor	Ziguinchor Airport		
Sierra Leone	Freetown	Lungi International Airport		

== Fleet ==
As of August 2025, Transair (Senegal) operates the following aircraft:

Transair fleet
Aircraft	In service	Orders	Passengers	Notes
Beechcraft 1900C	1	—	17	
Boeing 737-500	1	—		
Embraer EMB-120RT	1	—	30	
Embraer ERJ-145ER	2	—	50	
Total	5	0		

== Accidents ==
On May 9 2024, a Boeing 737-300 operated by Air Senegal and operating as Flight 301 skidded off the runway on takeoff at Blaise Diagne International Airport for a flight to Bamako.All 85 people on board survived with 10 people injured.
