= SMW =

SMW may refer to:

- Semantic MediaWiki, an extension to MediaWiki that allows for annotating semantic data within wiki pages
- Smara Airport, Western Sahara, IATA Airport Code
- Smoky Mountain Wrestling, a professional wrestling promotion that held events in the Appalachian area
- Special marine warning, a warning issued by the National Weather Service to warn of strong or severe storms over a marine area such as a lake or an ocean
- Super Mario World, a 1990 platformer by Nintendo for the Super Nintendo Entertainment System
- Shawnee Mission West, a high school in the Shawnee Mission School District in Kansas
