= KGG =

KGG or kgg may refer to:

- KGG, the IATA code for Kédougou Airport, Senegal
- KGG, the Indian Railways station code for Khagaria Junction railway station, Bihar, India
- kgg, the ISO 639-3 code for Kusunda language, Nepal
- KGG (AM), a radio station in Portland, Oregon, United States, that was licensed from 1922 until 1924
