= Jenje, Liberia =

Liberian town

Coordinates: 07°19′20″N 11°07′55″W

Jenje is a small town in western Liberia near the country's border with Sierra Leone.

== Minerals ==
It has an iron ore mine which is connected by a 1067mm gauge railway to the port and capital city of Monrovia.

== See also ==
- Transport in Liberia
