= BXE =

BXE or bxe may refer to:

- BXE, the IATA code for Bakel Airport, Senegal
- bxe, the ISO 639-3 code for Ongota language, Ethiopia
