= Lamco Airport =

Airport in Liberia

- IATA: none; ICAO: GLLB

Summary
- Airport type: Public
- Serves: Buchanan, Liberia
- Elevation AMSL: 30 ft / 9 m
- Coordinates: 5°51′28″N 10°1′12″W

Map

Runways
Direction	Length		Surface
Direction	m	ft	Surface
06/24	1,400	4,593	Dirt
- Source: Google Maps GCM

Lamco Airport (ICAO: GLLB) is an airport serving Buchanan, in the Grand Bassa County in Liberia. The runway is 3 kilometres (1.9 mi) south of the city.

== See also ==
- Transport in Liberia
