= Cape Palmas Airport =

Airport in Liberia

- IATA: CPA; ICAO: GLCP

Summary
- Airport type: Public
- Serves: Harper
- Elevation AMSL: 20 ft / 6 m
- Coordinates: 4°22′45″N 7°41′48″W

Map

Runways
Direction	Length		Surface
Direction	ft	m	Surface
06/24	3,282	1,000	Unpaved
- Source: Google Maps

Cape Palmas Airport (IATA: CPA, ICAO: GLCP) is an airport serving the town of Harper on Cape Palmas, Liberia.

== See also ==
- Transport in Liberia
- List of airports in Liberia
