= Voinjama Airport =

Airport in Liberia

Voinjama Airport Tenebu Airfield
- IATA: VOI; ICAO: GLVA

Summary
- Airport type: Public
- Serves: Voinjama
- Elevation AMSL: 1,395 ft / 425 m
- Coordinates: 8°19′40″N 9°46′5″W

Map

Runways
Direction	Length		Surface
Direction	ft	m	Surface
03/21	4,920	1,500	Unpaved
- Source: Google Maps SkyVector

Voinjama Airport (IATA: VOI, ICAO: GLVA) is an airport serving the town of Voinjama, Liberia. The airport is near the village of Tenebu, 10 kilometres (6 mi) south of Voinjama.

== See also ==
- Transport in Liberia
