= Buchanan Airport =

Airport in Liberia

- IATA: UCN; ICAO: GLBU

Summary
- Airport type: Public
- Serves: Buchanan
- Elevation AMSL: 41 ft / 12 m
- Coordinates: 5°54′15″N 10°3′30″W

Map

Runways
Direction	Length		Surface
Direction	ft	m	Surface
17/35	3,400	1,036	Unpaved
- Source: Google Maps

Buchanan Airport (IATA: UCN, ICAO: GLBU) is an airport serving Buchanan, in the Grand Bassa County in Liberia.

== See also ==
- Transport in Liberia
