= Foya Airport =

Airport in Liberia

- IATA: FOY; ICAO: none

Summary
- Airport type: Public
- Serves: Foya
- Elevation AMSL: 1,470 ft / 448 m
- Coordinates: 8°21′08″N 10°13′35″W

Map

Runways
Direction	Length		Surface
Direction	ft	m	Surface
01/19	4,330	1,320	Unpaved
- Source: Google Maps

Foya Airport (IATA: FOY) is an airport serving the town of Foya, in Lofa County, Liberia.

== See also ==
- Transport in Liberia
