= Ziguinchor Airport =

Airport in Senegal

Ziguinchor Airport Aéroport de Ziguinchor
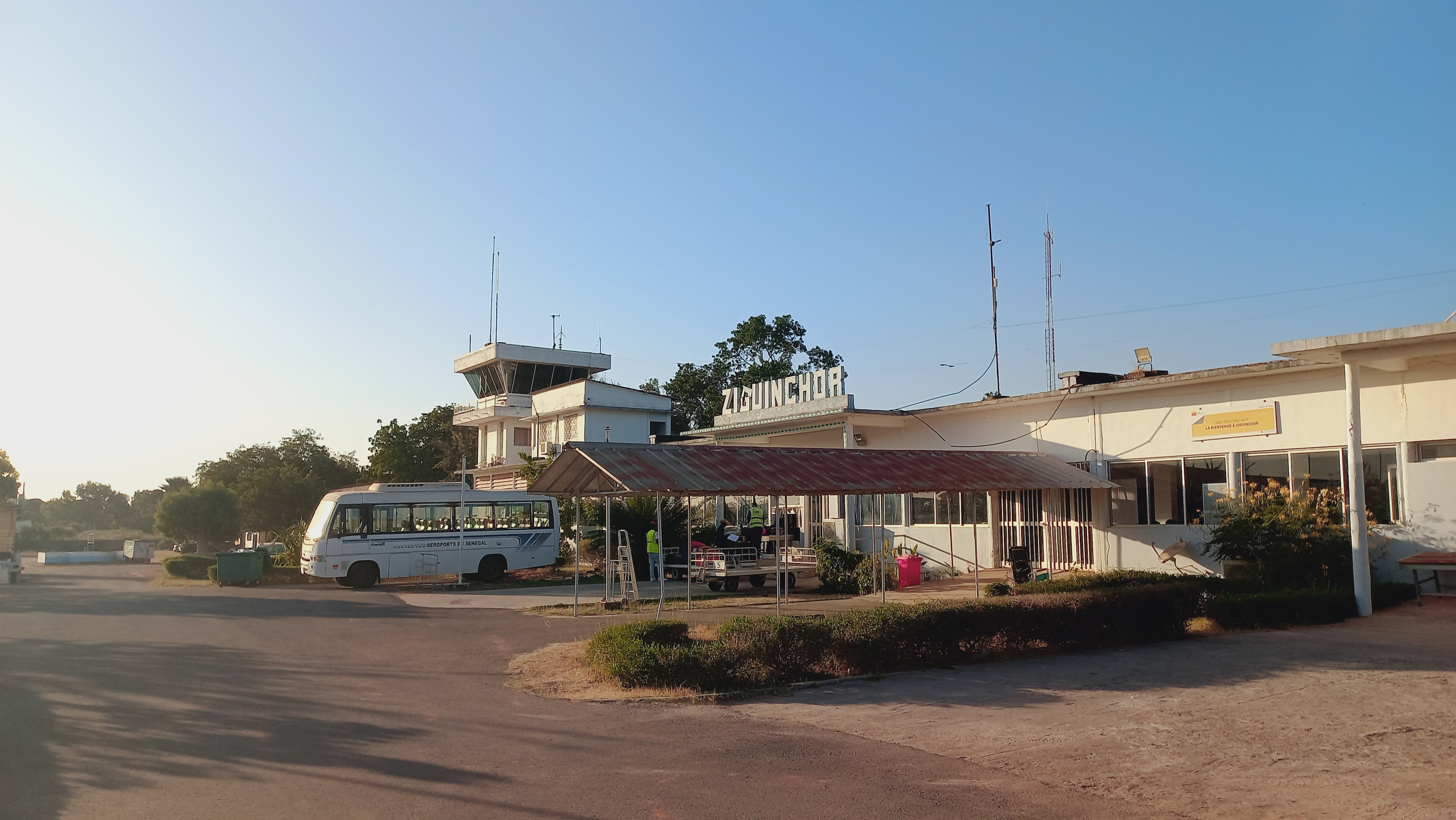
- IATA: ZIG; ICAO: GOGG

Summary
- Airport type: Public
- Operator: Government
- Serves: Ziguinchor, Senegal
- Elevation AMSL: 75 ft (23 m)
- Coordinates: 12°33′20″N 016°16′54″W

Map
- Location of Airport in Senegal

Runways
Direction	Length		Surface
Direction	m	ft	Surface
10/28	1,545	5,069	Asphalt
- Source: DAFIF

Ziguinchor Airport (French: Aéroport de Ziguinchor) (IATA: ZIG, ICAO: GOGG) is an airport serving Ziguinchor, the capital of the Ziguinchor Region (also known as Basse Casamance) in Senegal.

== Airlines and destinations ==
Airlines	Destinations
Air Senegal	Dakar–Diass
Transair	Dakar–Diass
