= Sasstown District =

District in Grand Kru County, Liberia

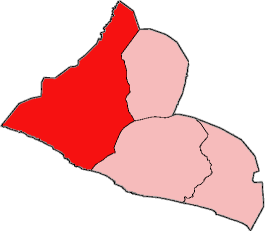
Location of Sasstown District in Grand Kru County

Sasstown District is one of four districts located in Grand Kru County, Liberia.
