= Sasstown =

Village in Grand Kru County, Liberia

- Location in Liberia
- Coordinates: 4°40′30″N 8°25′16″W
- Country: Liberia
- County: Grand Kru
- District: Sasstown District

Population
  - Total: 500

Sasstown is a community in the Sasstown District of Grand Kru County, Liberia.

== History ==
Sasstown likely did not become a village before 1830. The original settlement one mile inland is now known as Old Sasstown or Filorkli. It was established by a group of Kru called the Jlao.

By 1887, the town had an estimated population of over 3,000. From 1889 onward, the Methodist Episcopal Church was active in Sasstown, sending missionaries who started a Christian school and coffee farm. In 1894, the church in Sasstown had more than 200 members.

== Transport ==
The town is served by Sasstown Airport.
