= Foya =

Town in Lofa County, Liberia

- Location in Liberia
- Coordinates: 8°16′17″N 10°13′42″W
- Country: Liberia
- County: Lofa County
- District: Foya District

Population (2008)
  - Total: 20,569

Foya is a town in the Foya District of Lofa County, Liberia. Located 66 kilometers from Voinjama, it is home to the Kissi-speaking tribes of Liberia. Foya shares border with Sierra Leone and Guinea; it is the major trade link for the people in the far north of Lofa County. Hon William T. Kamba is the district commissioner of Foya.

As of the 2008 census, Foya had a population of 20,569.

== History ==
In October 2001 at least eight civilians were killed by LURD forces near Foya. The town is served by Foya Airport. The Ebola virus epidemic in Liberia started in Foya in March 2014 with two cases.

== Economy ==
The road from Voinjama to Foya is a third level road with recent repair work done by the UNHCR estimated at 3,000,000 United States dollars. A local FM radio keeps the town informed about local and international development, it also used to broadcast programmes from the UNMIL radio in Monrovia. The presence of the UNMIL troops helped the stability of the town and its surrounding area.
