= Nimba Airport =

Airport in Liberia

- IATA: NIA; ICAO: GLNA

Summary
- Airport type: Public
- Serves: Yekepa, Nimba Nature Reserve
- Elevation AMSL: 1,632 ft / 497 m
- Coordinates: 7°29′30″N 8°35′00″W

Map

Runways
Direction	Length		Surface
Direction	ft	m	Surface
16/34	5,900	1,800	Unpaved
- Source: Google Maps

Nimba Airport (IATA: NIA, ICAO: GLNA) is an airport in Liberia near the triple border of Liberia, Côte d'Ivoire, and Guinea. It serves Yekepa, Sanniquellie, and the Nimba Nature Reserve.

== See also ==
- Transport in Liberia
