= Kita Airport =

Airport in Mali

Kita Airport Aéroport de Kita
- IATA: none; ICAO: GAKT

Summary
- Airport type: Public
- Serves: Kita, Mali
- Elevation AMSL: 1,122 ft / 342 m
- Coordinates: 13°04′N 009°29′W

Map
- Location of Kita Airport in Mali

Runways
Direction	Length		Surface
Direction	m	ft	Surface
	800	2,625

Kita Airport (ICAO: GAKT) (French: Aéroport de Kita) is an airport serving Kita, a town and commune in the Kayes Cercle in the Kayes Region of Mali.

The airport is at an elevation of 1,122 feet (342 m) above mean sea level. It has one runway that is 800 metres (2,625 ft) long.
