= Kolda North Airport =

Airport in Senegal

- IATA: KDA; ICAO: GODK (was GOGK)

Summary
- Airport type: Public
- Operator: Government
- Serves: Kolda, Senegal
- Elevation AMSL: 33 ft (10 m)
- Coordinates: 12°53′54″N 014°58′05″W

Map
- Location within Senegal

Runways
Direction	Length		Surface
Direction	m	ft	Surface
02/20	1,502	4,927	Asphalt
- Source: DAFIF

Kolda North Airport (IATA: KDA, ICAO: GODK, formerly GOGK) is an airport serving Kolda, the capital of the Kolda Region (also known as Haute Casamance) in Senegal.

== History ==
Kolda North Airport was established in 1991 to replace the original Kolda Airport, and was closed afterwards. The original airport was equipped with a 3,891 x 98 laterite runway, and was unserviceable by July 2003. Kolda North Airport was built with 4,927 x 50 asphalt runway, equipped with an apron, taxiway, perimeter fencing, and a runway turnaround.

== Airlines and destinations ==
Airlines	Destinations
Transair	Dakar–Diass
