= Bandiagara Airport =

Bandiagara Airport Aéroport de Bandiagara
- IATA: none; ICAO: GABD

Summary
- Airport type: Public
- Serves: Bandiagara
- Elevation AMSL: 1,312 ft / 400 m
- Coordinates: 14°20′10″N 3°36′35″W

Map
- Location of the airport in Mali

Runways
Direction	Length		Surface
Direction	ft	m	Surface
09/27	2,955	900	Dirt
- Source: Google Maps

Bandiagara Airport (ICAO: GABD) (French: Aéroport de Bandiagara) is an airport serving Bandiagara in Mali.
