= Ifrane Airport =

Airport serving Ifrane, Morocco

Ifrane Airport مطار إفران
- IATA: none; ICAO: GMFI

Summary
- Airport type: Public
- Serves: Ifrane, Morocco
- Elevation AMSL: 5,459 ft (1,664 m)
- Coordinates: 33°30′19″N 005°09′10″W

Map
- Location of Ifrane Airport in Morocco

Runways
Direction	Length		Surface
Direction	m	ft	Surface
03/21	2,109	6,920	Asphalt
- Source: DAFIF

Ifrane Airport (Arabic: مطار إفران) (ICAO: GMFI) is an airport serving Ifrane, a town in the Fès-Meknès region in Morocco.

== Facilities ==
The airport resides at an elevation of 5,459 feet (1,664 m) above mean sea level. It has one runway designated 03/21 with an asphalt surface measuring 2,109 by 35 metres (6,919 ft × 115 ft).
