= Tchien Airport =

Airport in Liberia

- IATA: THC; ICAO: GLTN

Summary
- Airport type: Public
- Serves: Zwedru
- Elevation AMSL: 787.4 ft / 240 m
- Coordinates: 6°03′00″N 8°08′20″W

Map

Runways
Direction	Length		Surface
Direction	ft	m	Surface
01/19	5,660	1,725	Unpaved
- Source: Google Maps

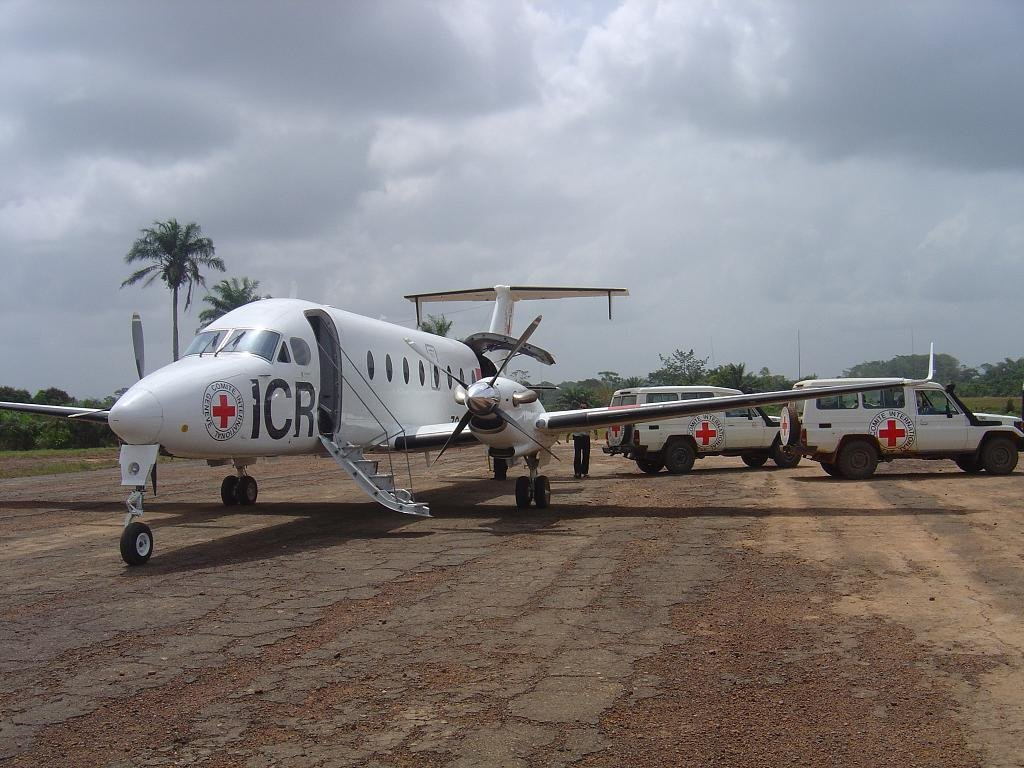
Zwedru Airport

Tchien Airport (IATA: THC, ICAO: GLTN) is an airport serving the town of Zwedru, in Tchien District, Grand Gedeh County, Liberia.

== See also ==
- Transport in Liberia
