= Cap Skirring Airport =

Airport in Senegal

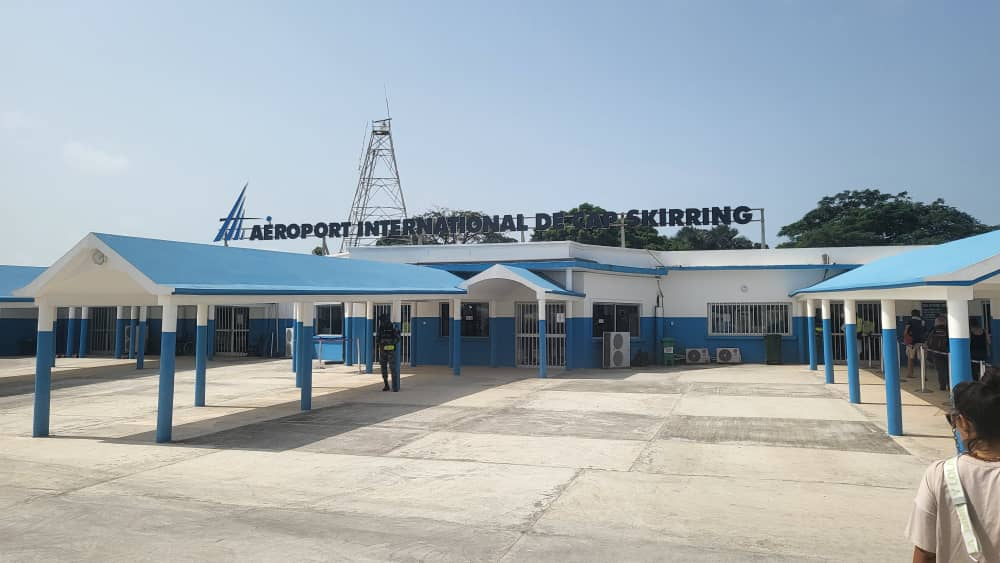
- IATA: CSK; ICAO: GOGS

Summary
- Airport type: Public
- Serves: Cap Skirring, Senegal
- Elevation AMSL: 56 ft (17 m)
- Coordinates: 12°24′36″N 016°44′46″W

Map
- Location of Airport in Senegal

Runways
Direction	Length		Surface
Direction	m	ft	Surface
15/33	2,000	6,561	Asphalt
- Source: DAFIF

Cap Skirring Airport (IATA: CSK, ICAO: GOGS) is an airport serving Cap Skirring (also spelled Cap Skiring), a town in the Ziguinchor (also known as Basse Casamance) region of Senegal.

== Airlines and destinations ==
Airlines	Destinations
Air Senegal	Dakar–Diass
Transair	Dakar–Diass
