= Sefrou Airport =

Sefrou Airport (ICAO: GMFU) was an airport serving Fes, Morocco. The airport has been built over since the opening of Saiss Airport (GMFF/FEZ). Google Earth historical imagery from 9/27/2003 shows the remains of an east/west grass strip with building construction in progress. Current satellite image shows the area covered with streets, apartment blocks, and a soccer stadium.

== See also ==
- Transport in Morocco
