= Smara Airport =

Airport in Western Sahara

- IATA: SMW; ICAO: GMMA/GSMA

Summary
- Airport type: Military
- Serves: Smara (Semara)
- Location: Morocco
- Elevation AMSL: 350 ft (110 m)
- Coordinates: 26°43′54″N 011°41′04″W

Map
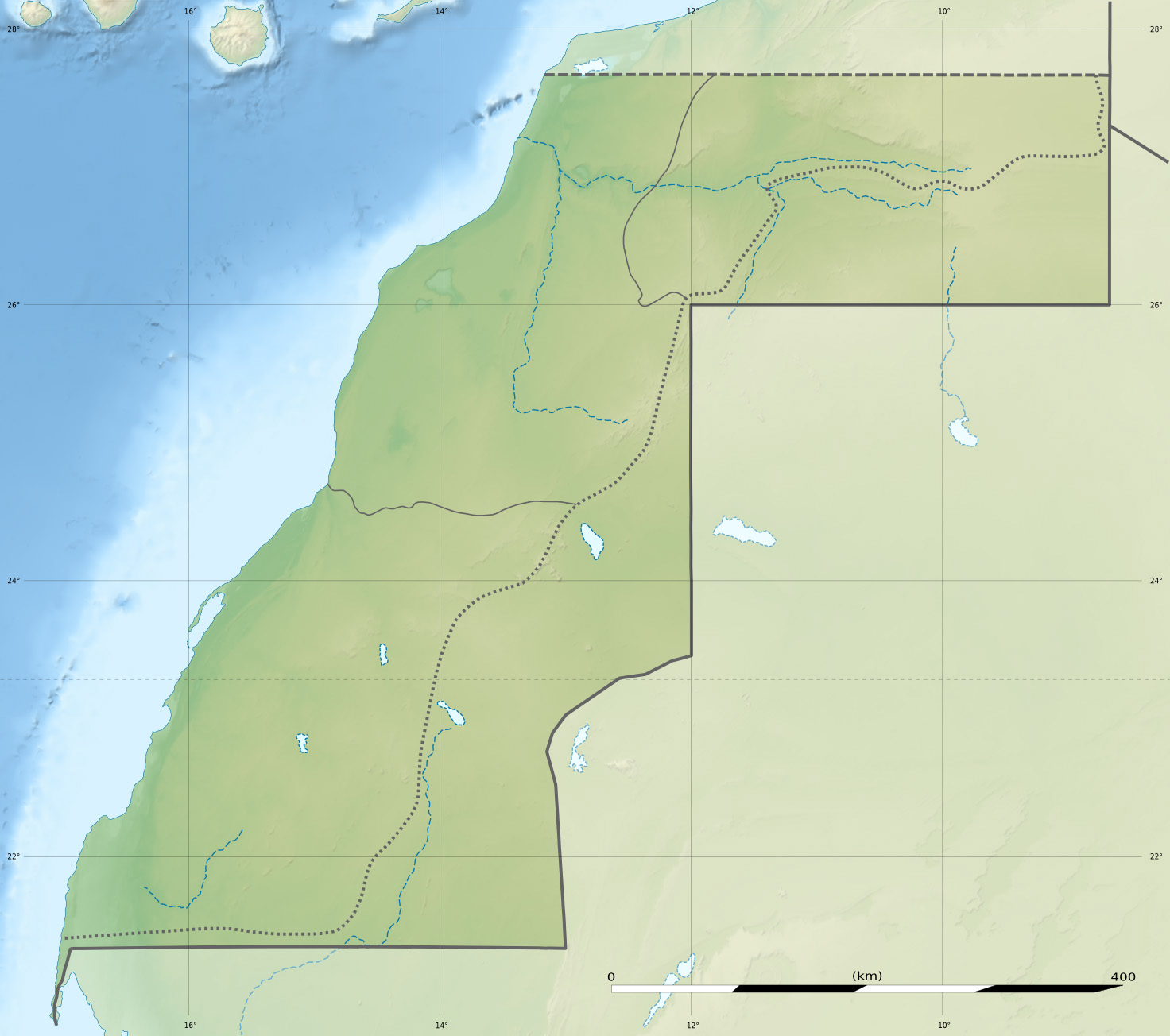
- Location within Western Sahara

Runways
Direction	Length		Surface
Direction	m	ft	Surface
16/34	3,002	9,850	Asphalt
- Source: DAFIF

Smara Airport (IATA: SMW, ICAO: GMMA/GSMA) is an airport in Smara (also known as Semara), a city in Morocco.

Between 1977 and 2006, the Ministry of Equipment and Transport invested MAD 21.5 million in capital works, including extending the main runway to 3,000 m (9,800 ft) and construction of a hardstand for aircraft parking and movement.

It was reported in 2024 that an investigation by French newspaper L'Humanité found Morocco was using the airport as a launching point for Elbit Hermes 900 and Hermes 450 armed drones for attacks that killed Sahrawi civilians in the disputed Western Sahara territory.

In April 2025, the Moroccan government announced a project to upgrade the airport to prepare for commercial passenger airlines to begin service to the region. The upgrade, co-ordinated by the Royal Moroccan Armed Forces allowed the airport to handle larger aircraft as part of efforts to promote economic development and growth in the region and was followed in November by the introduction of twice-weekly flights by Royal Air Maroc to Casablanca.

== Destinations ==
Airlines	Destinations
Royal Air Maroc	Casablanca
