= Richard Toll Airport =

Airport in Senegal

- IATA: RDT; ICAO: GOSR

Summary
- Airport type: Public
- Serves: Richard Toll, Senegal
- Elevation AMSL: 20 ft / 6 m
- Coordinates: 16°26′15″N 015°39′26″W

Map
- Location within Senegal

Runways
Direction	Length		Surface
Direction	m	ft	Surface
08/26	1,550	5,085

Richard Toll Airport (IATA: RDT, ICAO: GOSR) is an airport serving Richard Toll, a town in the Saint-Louis Region in northern Senegal.
