= Richard Toll =

- Town and commune
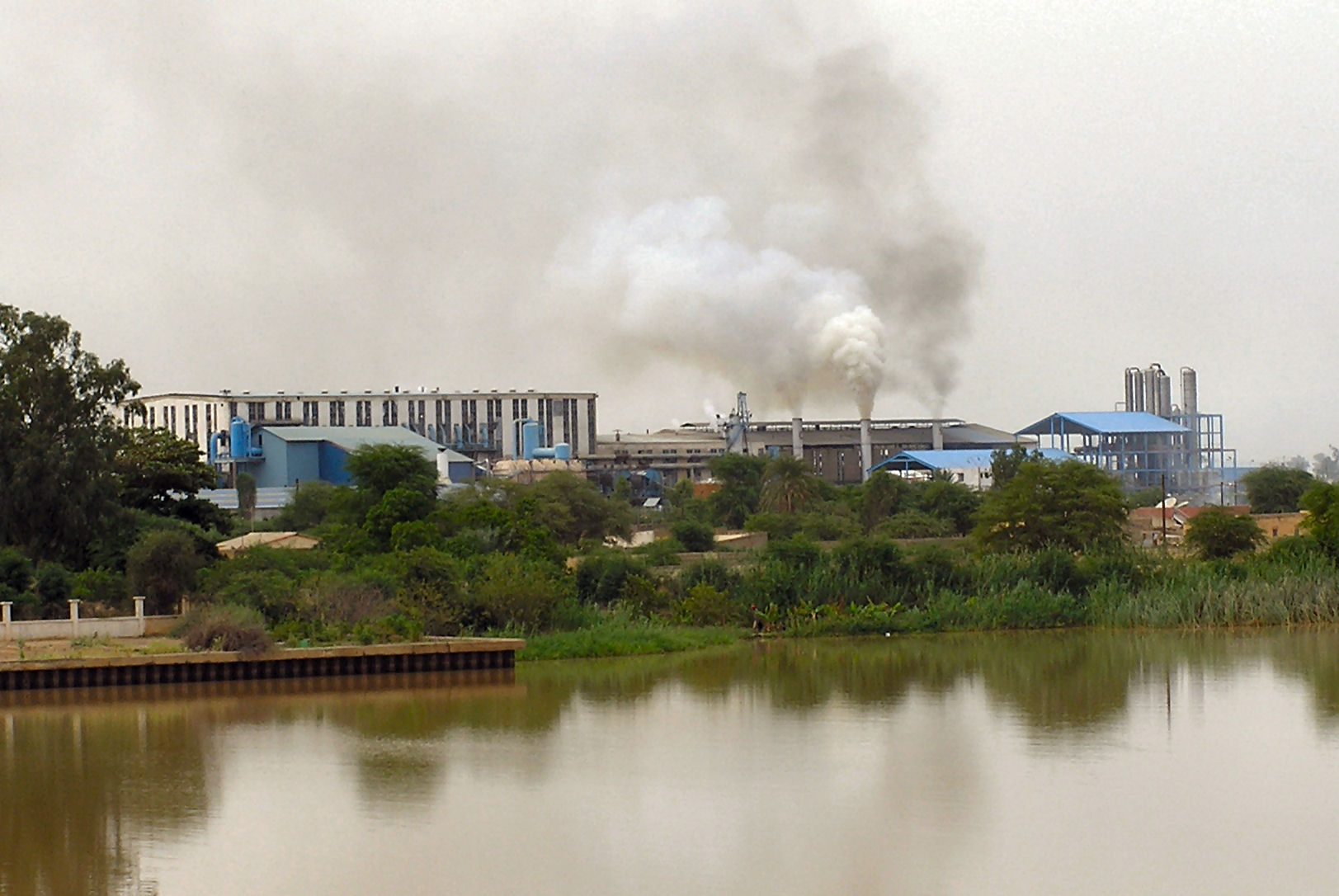

- Location within Senegal
- Coordinates: 16°28′N 15°41′W
- Country: Senegal
- Region: Saint-Louis
- Department: Dagana

Area
  - Town and commune: 11.62 km^{2} (4.49 sq mi)

Population (2023 census)
  - Town and commune: 73,147
  - Density: 6,295/km^{2} (16,300/sq mi)
- Time zone: UTC+0 (GMT)

Richard Toll is a town and urban commune in northern Senegal, lying on the south bank of the Senegal River, just east of Rosso. Originally a colonial town, it was named for the park of the Château de Baron Roger, laid out by botanist Jean Michel Claude Richard. A rice-growing scheme was originally initiated by France's colonial development organisation, FIDES, in 1949 with an initial cultivated area of 6,000 hectares (14,830 acres). The town's main industry is sugar. The population in 2023 was 73,147.

== History ==
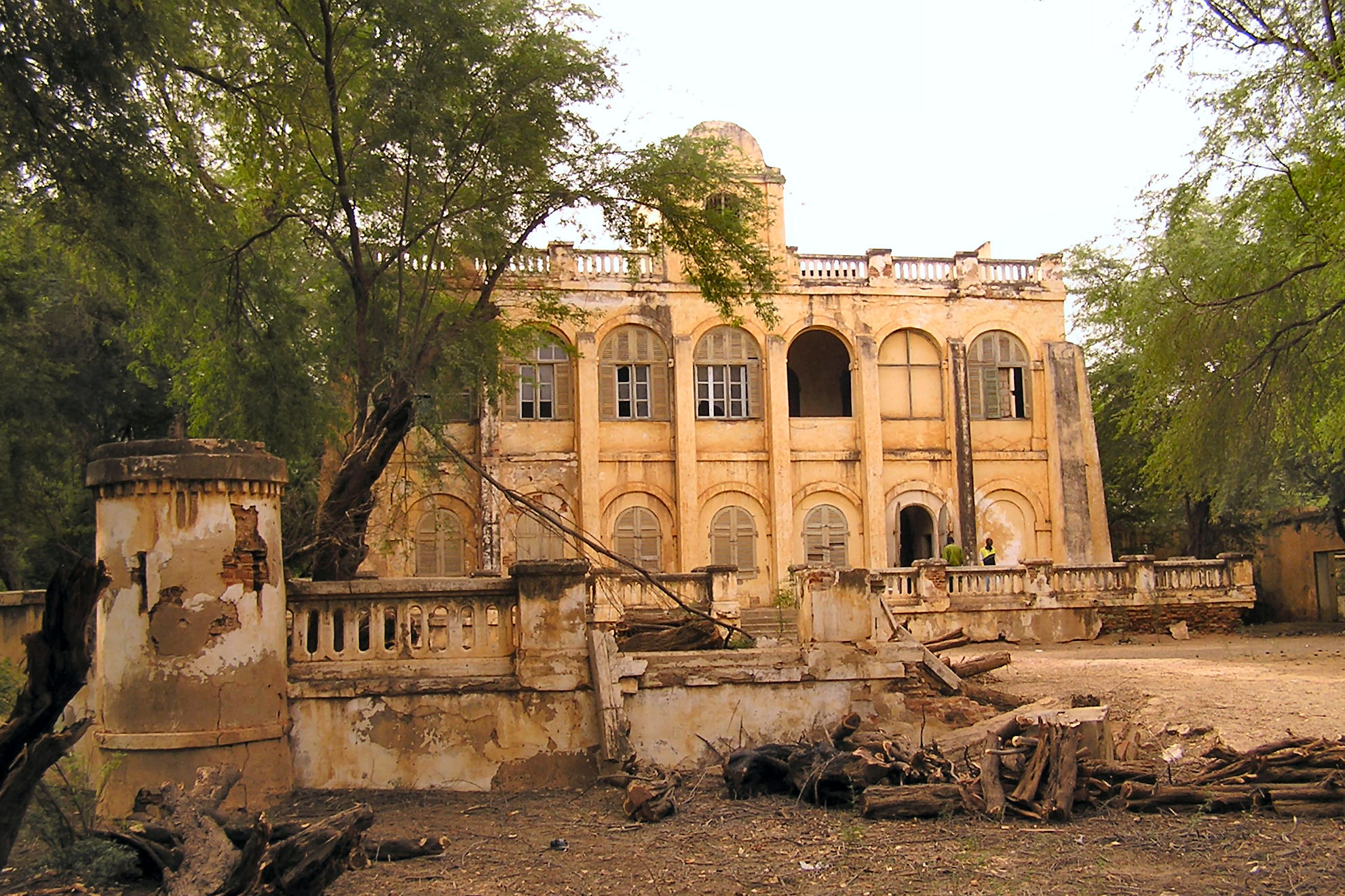
The Château de Baron Roger

Until 1817, at roughly the location of Richard Toll there were two communities, Ndiangué and Xhouma, inhabited by the Mbodi — descendants of Brack and followers of the royalist Walo tradition. In 1817 the French government's most senior representative in the region, Schmaltz, created an outpost community on the Senegal River, naming it l’Escale.

In 1822, the new governor, Baron Jacques-François Roger, sent a botanist and nurseryman named Jean Michel Claude Richard to work in L'Escale and renamed it Richard's Toll, with Toll being the word for Farm in Pulaar, a local language. At this time there were 28 residents, and 1,148 nomadic workers living in Toll. It grew greatly in 1945 with the creation of the Mission Agricole du Sénégal, which also brought other institutions such as a hospital, and chapel, and a school. There was a rapid demographic growth in 1970 with the implementation of the Compagnie Sucrière Sénégalaise, 'Senegal Sugar Company', which brought in around 15,000 inhabitants and brought about two phenomena: the joining of the local villages, and the creation of new neighbourhoods.

By 1980, Richard Toll had six neighbourhoods: Escale, Ndaingue, Ndiaw, Khoum Wadi, Khoum Peul, and Ndombo Al'Arabi. Since then the city has grown and evolved into what it is today, including the addition of neighbourhoods such as Campement, Thiaback, GAE2, and Taouey.

== Population and demography ==
The latest estimate of the population available at the mayors office with was from 2005 which was at 46,547, however more recent estimates have put it around 90,000.

The latest gender, and age breakdown the mayors office had was from 2006, which stated 77.79% of inhabitants were between the ages of 0 and 34, 20.71% were between the ages of 35 and 74, and 1.19% were over the age of 75. Women constituted 52.01% of the population, and men 47.99%.

== Neighbourhoods ==
Richard Toll currently comprises 12 neighbourhoods: Ndiao, Ndiangue, Richard Toll Escale, Campement et Nourou, Thiabakh, Ndombo Al'Arabi, Khouma Gallo Malick, Gae II, Khouma Yakh Sabar, and Khouma Mbodiène/Khouma Thiarène.

== Transportation ==
The town is served by Richard Toll Airport.

== Economic activities ==
The main economic activities in Richard Toll are agriculture, fishing, animal husbandry, and commerce. Less popular economic activities are transportation, tourism, and artisanal goods. Richard Toll is most known for its sugar refinery, which is French-owned and exports sugar to most of Senegal.

== Popular culture ==
Marie Laforêt sang a song about Richard Toll.
