= Linguère Airport =

Airport in Senegal

- IATA: none; ICAO: GOOG

Summary
- Airport type: Public
- Serves: Linguère
- Elevation AMSL: 125 ft (38 m)
- Coordinates: 15°24′00″N 15°05′00″W

Map
- Location of the airport in Senegal

Runways
Direction	Length		Surface
Direction	ft	m	Surface
08/26	4,555	1,388	Dirt
- Source: Google Maps

Linguère Airport (ICAO: GOOG) is an airport serving the city of Linguère in Senegal.

== See also ==
- Transport in Senegal
