= Podor Airport =

Airport in Senegal

- IATA: POD; ICAO: GOSP

Summary
- Airport type: Public
- Serves: Podor, Senegal
- Elevation AMSL: 20 ft / 6 m
- Coordinates: 16°40′41″N 014°57′54″W

Map
- Location within Senegal

Runways
Direction	Length		Surface
Direction	m	ft	Surface
15/33	1,560	5,120
- Sources: airport codes, elevation, runway length, coordinates

Podor Airport is an airport serving Podor, a town in the Saint-Louis Region of Senegal. Podor is located on Morfil Island between the Sénégal River and Doué River.
