= Simenti Airport =

Airport in Senegal

- IATA: SMY; ICAO: GOTS

Summary
- Airport type: Public
- Serves: Simenti, Senegal
- Elevation AMSL: 171 ft / 52 m
- Coordinates: 13°02′48″N 013°17′41″W

Map
- Location within Senegal

Runways
Direction	Length		Surface
Direction	m	ft	Surface
03/21	1,800	5,906	Dirt
- Sources: airport codes, elevation, runway length, coordinates

Simenti Airport (IATA: SMY, ICAO: GOTS) is an airport serving Simenti in Senegal.
