= Sasstown Airport =

Airport in Liberia

Coordinates: 4.66667°N 8.43333°W

- IATA: SAZ; ICAO: GLST

Summary
- Serves: Sasstown
- Location: Liberia
- Elevation AMSL: 6 ft / 2 m

Map
- Location within Liberia

Sasstown Airport (IATA: SAZ, ICAO: GLST) is an airport serving Sasstown in Liberia. It was renovated in 1974, and was deemed unusable later that year. In April 2019, the creation of a domestic commercial airline service were planned.
