= Niokolo-Koba National Park =

National park in Senegal

- IUCN category II (national park)
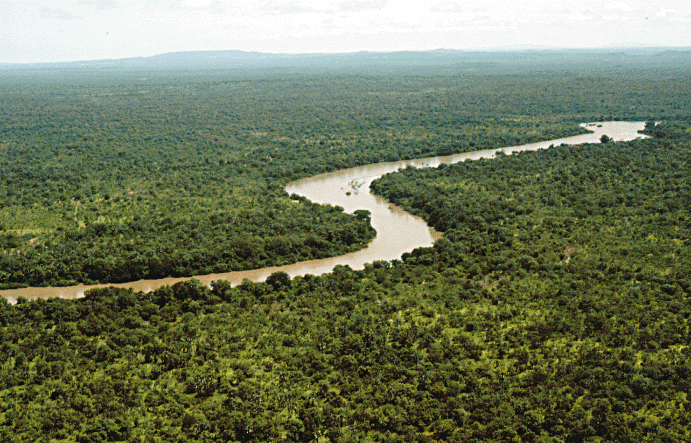
- Gambia River in the national park

- Location within Senegal
- Location: Senegal
- Coordinates: 13°04′N 12°43′W
- Area: 9,130 km^{2} (3,530 sq mi)
- Established: 1954, 1969

UNESCO World Heritage Site
- Type: Natural
- Criteria: x
- Designated: 1981 (5th session)
- Reference no.: 153
- Region: Africa
- Endangered: 2007–2024

Niokolo-Koba National Park (French: Parc National du Niokolo Koba, PNNK) is a World Heritage Site and natural protected area in southeastern Senegal, near the Guinea border. It is served by Niokolo-Koba Airport, an unpaved airstrip.

== National park ==
Established as a reserve in 1925, Niokolo-Koba was declared a Senegalese national park on 1 January 1954. Expanded in 1969, it was inscribed as a World Heritage Site in 1981 as a UNESCO-MAB Biosphere Reserve. In 2007, it was added to the UNESCO List of Endangered World Heritage sites. It was removed from the list in 2024, following improvements in the park's state of conservation.

Since 2005, the protected area is considered a Lion Conservation Unit.

== Geography ==
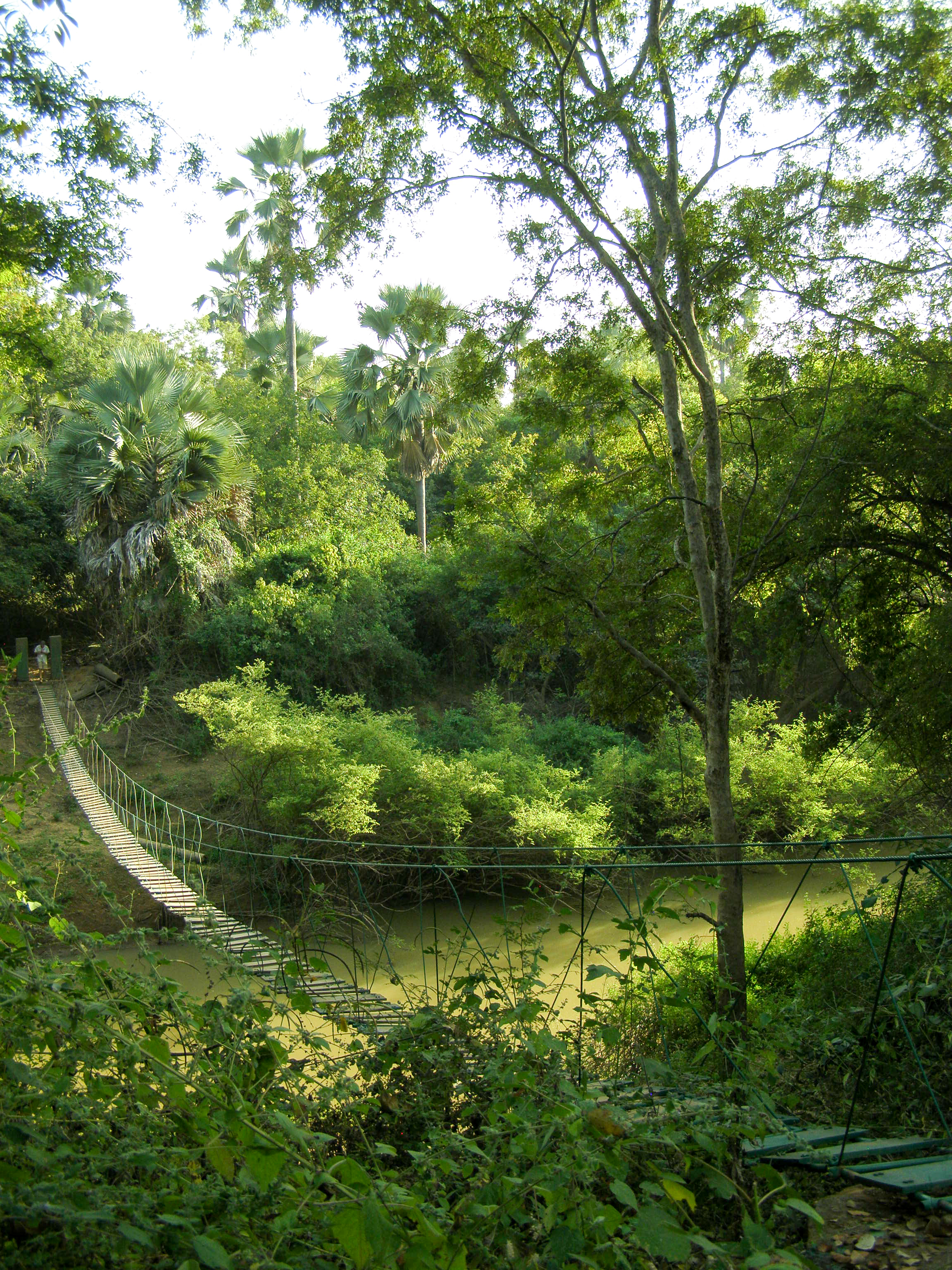
Adjudant-Chef Nouha Sane suspension bridge

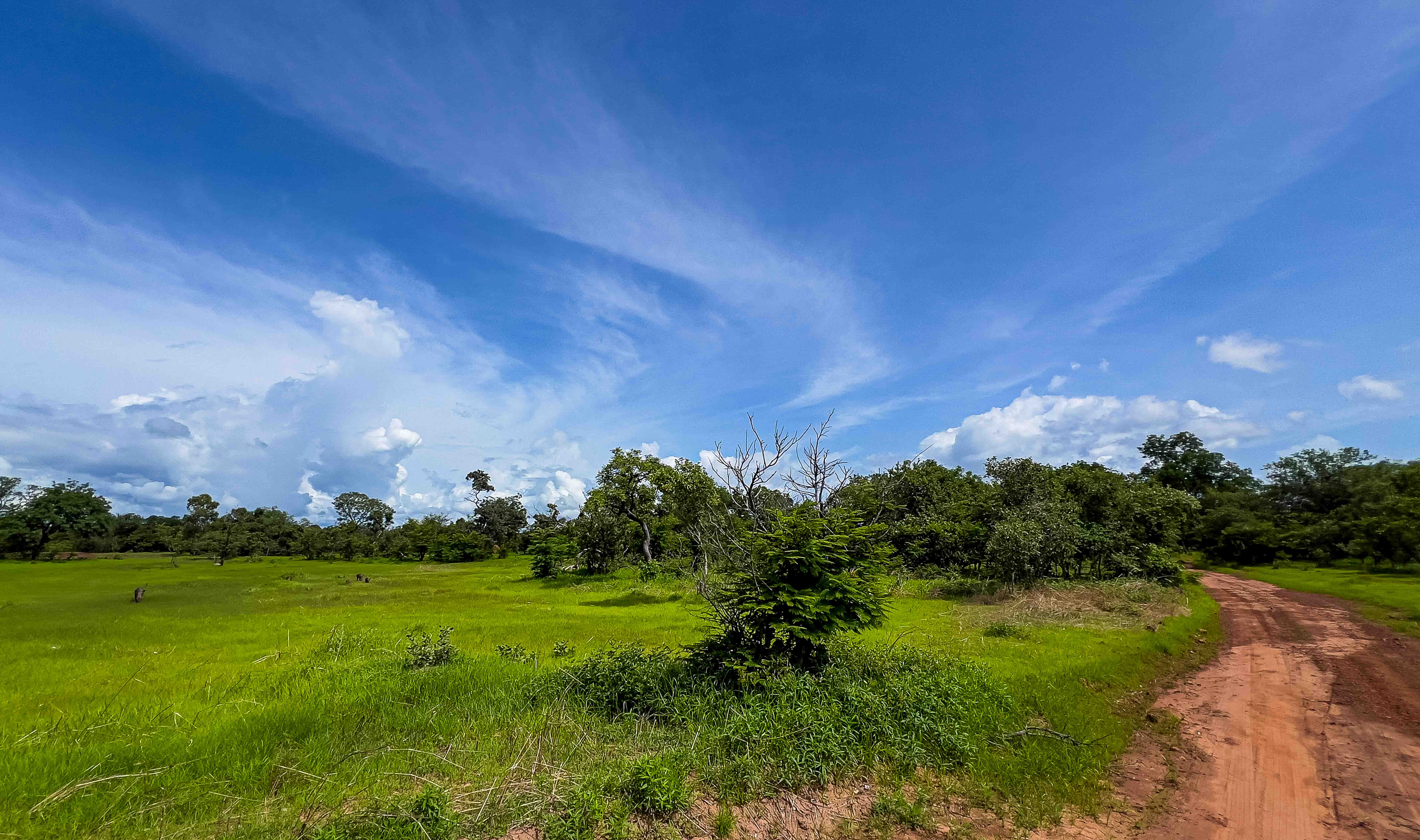
The landscape of the park

Niokolo-Koba National Park lies in an upland region, through which the upper stretch of the Gambia River flows towards the northwestern border of Guinea. It covers about 9,130 km^{2} (3,530 sq mi) in a great arc running from upper Casamance at the Guinea-Bissau border into the Tambacounda Region, to within a 100 km (62 mi) of the Guinean border near the southeastern corner of Senegal. Its elevation ranges from 16 to 311 m (52 to 1,020 ft).

== Flora ==
Most of Niokolo-Koba National Park consists of woodland savannah and semi-arid forest, with large areas of wooded and seasonal wetlands. It harbours over 1,500 species of plants and 78% of the gallery forest in Senegal.

Many trees and shrubs are covered by lush vegetation along the river stalks, and this vegetation changes according to the terrain and soil. In the valleys and plains, there are vast areas where Vetiveria and herbaceous savannah grow. Overgrown grasslands typically consist of Paspalum arbiculare and Echinochloa. There are also areas where bamboo grows. In valleys and belt-shaped forests, the species reflects the climate of southern Guinea, and tropical woody lianas are abundant. Semiaquatic species live on the riverside, and annual plants disappear when the water level rises. At the edge of the pond, dry forests and herbaceous savanna develop depending on the degree of humidity or soil compaction. Sometimes, thick bushes called Mimosa pigra occupy the middle of the wetlands.

== Fauna ==
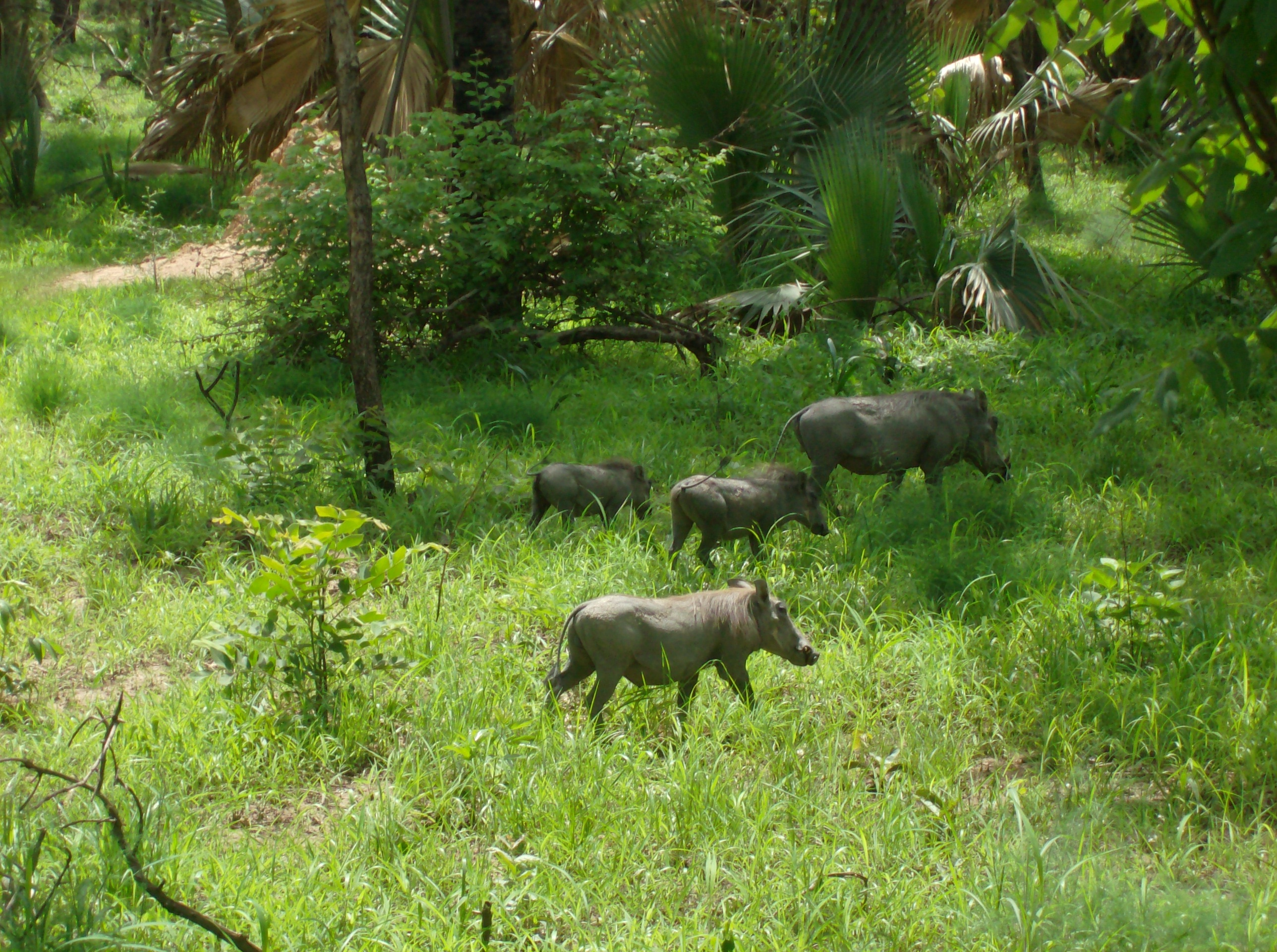
Warthog

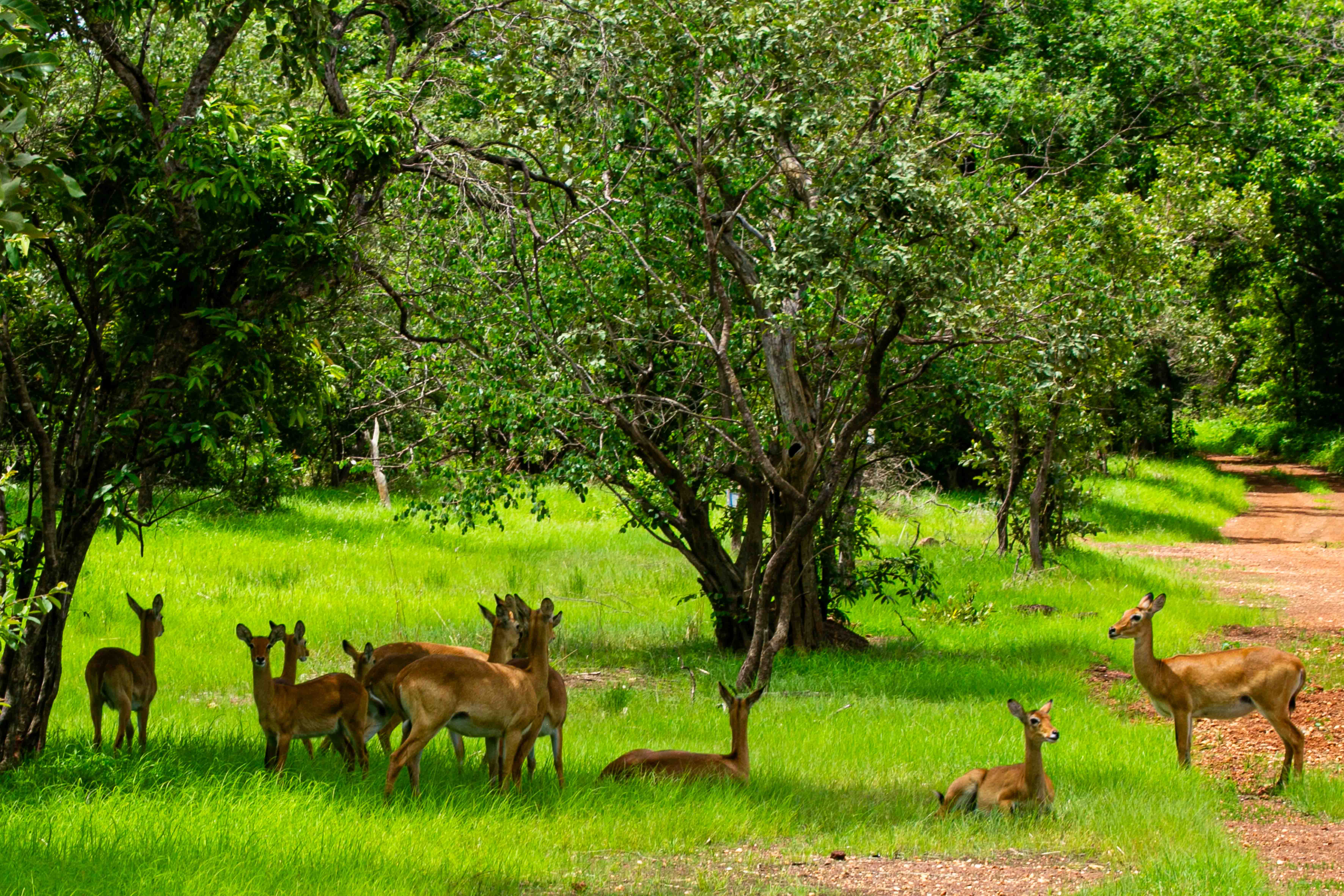
A group of kobs

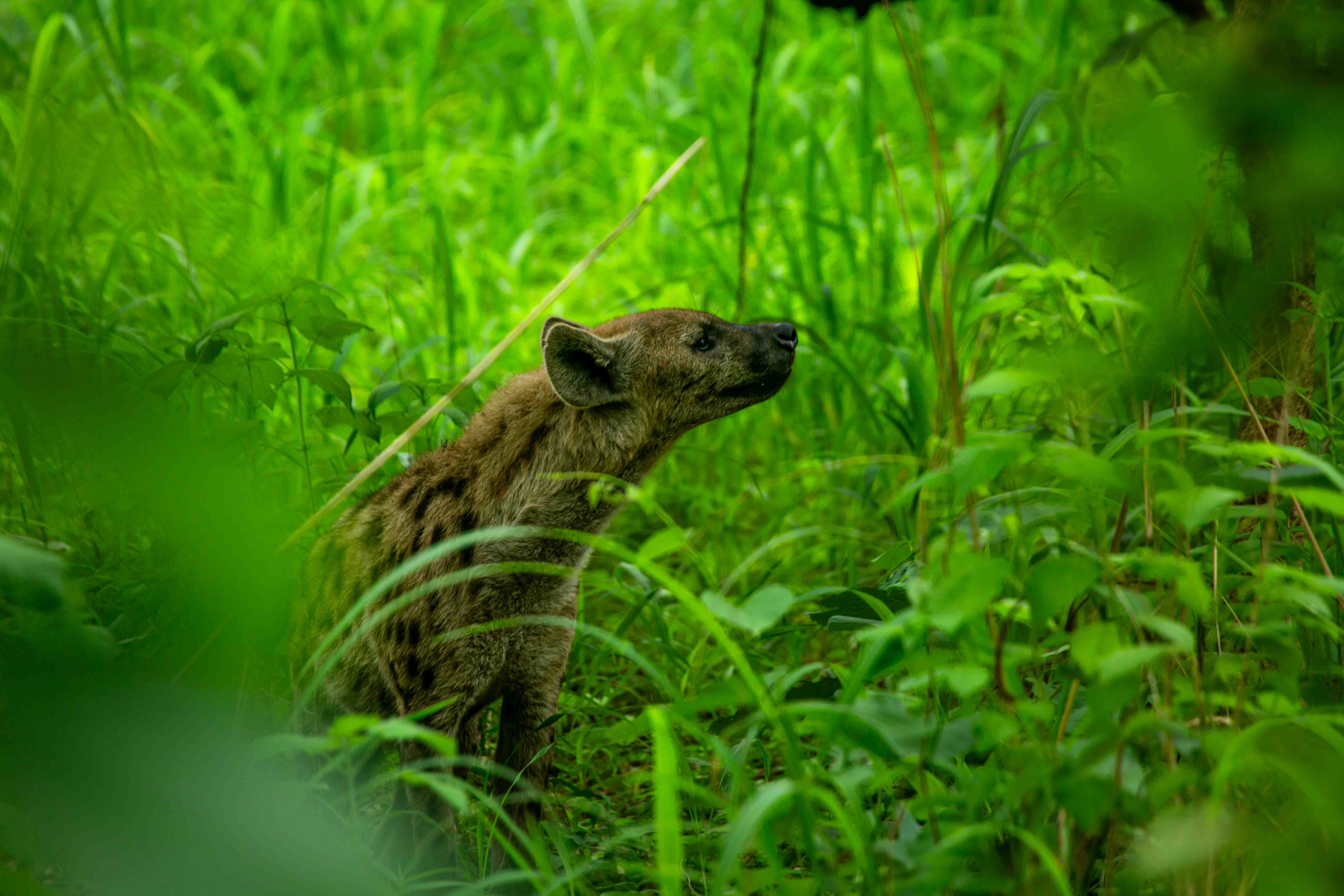
Spotted hyena

The national park is known for its wildlife. The government of Senegal estimates the park contains 20 species of amphibians, 60 species of fish, and 38 species of reptiles (of which four are tortoises). There are also some 80 mammal species. These include (as of 2005) an estimated 11,000 buffalo, 6,000 hippopotamuses, 400 western giant eland, 50 elephants, 120 lions, 150 chimpanzees, 3,000 waterbuck (Kobus ellipsiprymnus), 2,000 common duikers (Sylvicapra grimmia), an unknown number of Western red colobus (Piliocolobus badius), and a few rare African leopards and West African wild dogs (Lycaon pictus manguensis), although this canid was thought to be wiped out throughout the rest of the country.

Other mammals include roan antelope, Guinea baboon, green monkey, patas monkey, and common warthog.

Around 330 species of birds have been sighted in the park, notably the Arabian bustard, black crowned crane, Abyssinian ground hornbill (Bucorvus abyssinicus), martial eagle, bateleur (Terathopius ecaudatus), and white-faced duck (Dendrocygna viduata).

There are also reptiles, such as three crocodile species and four tortoise species.

== See also ==
- Dindefelo Falls
- Tourism in Senegal
