= Greenville/Sinoe Airport =

Airport in Liberia

Greenville/Sinoe Airport R.E. Murray Airport
- IATA: SNI; ICAO: GLGE

Summary
- Airport type: Public
- Serves: Greenville, Liberia
- Elevation AMSL: 10 ft / 3 m
- Coordinates: 05°02′04″N 009°04′00″W

Map
- Location of airport in the Liberia

Runways
Direction	Length		Surface
Direction	m	ft	Surface
01/19	1,415	4,645	Unpaved

Greenville/Sinoe Airport (IATA: SNI, ICAO: GLGE) is an airport serving Greenville (also known as Sinoe), the capital of Sinoe County in southeastern Liberia.

It is also known as R.E. Murray Airport, named for Richard E. Murray, a Baptist missionary who was a delegate from Sinoe County to the 1847 constitutional convention and a signer of the 1847 Liberian Declaration of Independence.
