= Niokolo-Koba Airport =

Airport in Senegal

- IATA: NIK; ICAO: GOTN

Summary
- Airport type: Public
- Serves: Niokolo-Koba National Park
- Elevation AMSL: 285 ft / 87 m
- Coordinates: 13°03′15″N 12°43′35″W

Map
- Location of the airport in Senegal

Runways
Direction	Length		Surface
Direction	ft	m	Surface
02/20	4,760	1,450	Dirt
- Source: Google Maps

Niokolo-Koba Airport (IATA: NIK, ICAO: GOTN) is an airstrip serving the Niokolo-Koba National Park in Senegal.

== See also ==
- Transport in Senegal
