= Kaolack Airport =

- IATA: KLC; ICAO: GOOK

Summary
- Airport type: Public
- Operator: Government
- Location: Kaolack, Senegal
- Elevation AMSL: 26 ft (7.9 m)
- Coordinates: 14°08′48″N 016°03′04″W

Map
- Location within Senegal

Runways
Direction	Length		Surface
Direction	m	ft	Surface
06/24	1,600	5,249	Asphalt
- Source: DAFIF

Kaolack Airport (IATA: KLC, ICAO: GOOK) is an airport serving Kaolack, the capital of the Kaolack Region in Senegal.

== History ==
In 2020, construction work was started to enlarge the airport's landing runway. Its length went from 1,600 to 2,000 meters, and its width from 15 to 30 meters. The project was supervised by the National Army and handled by the construction company Eiffage. 162 houses were demolished around the construction area and the inhabitants, who were expropriated manu militari, were not offered any relocation options.
