= Ouro Sogui Airport =

Airport in Ouro Sogui, Senegal

- IATA: MAX; ICAO: GOSM

Summary
- Airport type: Public
- Serves: Matam, Senegal
- Location: Ouro Sogui
- Elevation AMSL: 85 ft / 26 m
- Coordinates: 15°35′37″N 013°19′22″W

Map
- Location within Senegal

Runways
Direction	Length		Surface
Direction	m	ft	Surface
13/31	1,920	6,299	Paved

Ouro Sogui Airport (IATA: MAX, ICAO: GOSM) is an airport serving Matam, a city on the Sénégal River and capital of the Matam Region in Senegal. The airport is 10 kilometres (6.2 mi) southwest of Matam, near the town of Ouro Sogui.
