= Voinjama =

Capital of Lofa County, Liberia

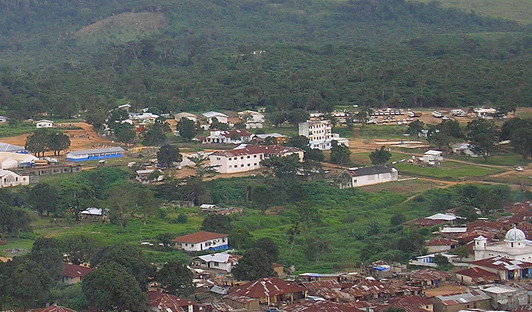

- Location in Liberia
- Coordinates: 8°25′N 9°45′W
- Country: Liberia
- County: Lofa County

Population (2008)
  - Total: 26,594
- Climate: Am

Voinjama is a small city that serves as the capital of Lofa County, Liberia and is located in the hilly, far northern part of the country near the Guinean border. As of the 2008 national census, the population stood at 26,594.

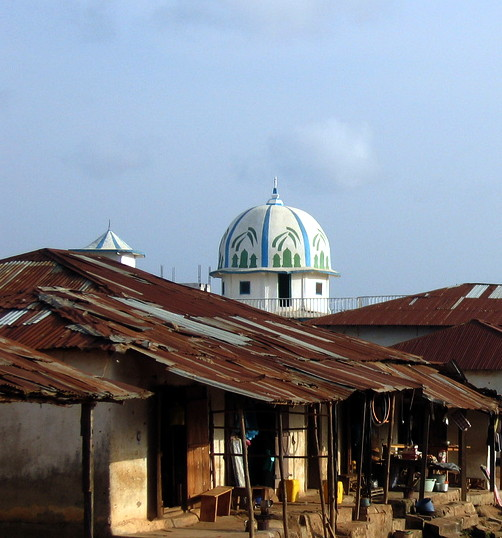
Mosque in Voinjama

Before the Liberian civil war it was a busy crossroads town, with a large weekly market. The population was principally from the Lorma and Mandingo tribes, with other ethnic groups from surrounding areas also present. It boasted a number of schools, including the public Voinjama Multilateral High School, as well as Saint Joseph's Catholic school under the direction of Sister Joan Margaret Kelly, and private schools run by Swedish missionaries and other groups. The Voinjama airport, outside of town on the road to Zorzor, featured a grass landing strip and flight service several times a week from Monrovia through the national carrier, Air Liberia.

The city had an electric generating station (with power in the evening) and a water treatment plant that supplied running water for most of the town. There were numerous general goods stores on the main road and a large parking station in the central plaza where one could catch a ride on a public car south to Zorzor, Gbarnga and Monrovia, west to Kolahun, Foya and Sierra Leone, or north to the Guinean border, four miles away.

Voinjama featured numerous churches of many different denominations as well as a mosque situated in the predominantly Muslim area of town known as the Mandingo Quarter. As capital of the county, it served as a government headquarters housing county officials and offices as well as being home to numerous international development projects, including the Lofa County Agricultural Development Project. It is served by a number of US Peace Corps Volunteers (Tarnue and Akoi) and Japan Overseas Cooperation Volunteers.

Subsistence rice farming was the principal occupation of most of the population. The rice generally grown in Liberia is dryland rice, on ground cleared through slashing and burning of the abundant forest land, and not paddy rice as in other parts of the world. Other prominent crops grown in the Voinjama area were cassava, potato greens, collard greens, and palm nuts, from which the popular red palm oil was extracted. "Palm wine" harvested from certain palm trees was also popular.
