= Tambacounda Airport =

Airport in Senegal

- IATA: TUD; ICAO: GOTT

Summary
- Airport type: Public
- Serves: Tambacounda, Senegal
- Elevation AMSL: 161 ft (49 m)
- Coordinates: 13°44′12″N 013°39′11″W

Map
- Location within Senegal

Runways
Direction	Length		Surface
Direction	m	ft	Surface
06/24	2,000	6,561	Asphalt
- Source: DAFIF

Tambacounda Airport (IATA: TUD, ICAO: GOTT) is an airport serving Tambacounda, the capital of the Tambacounda Region in Senegal.

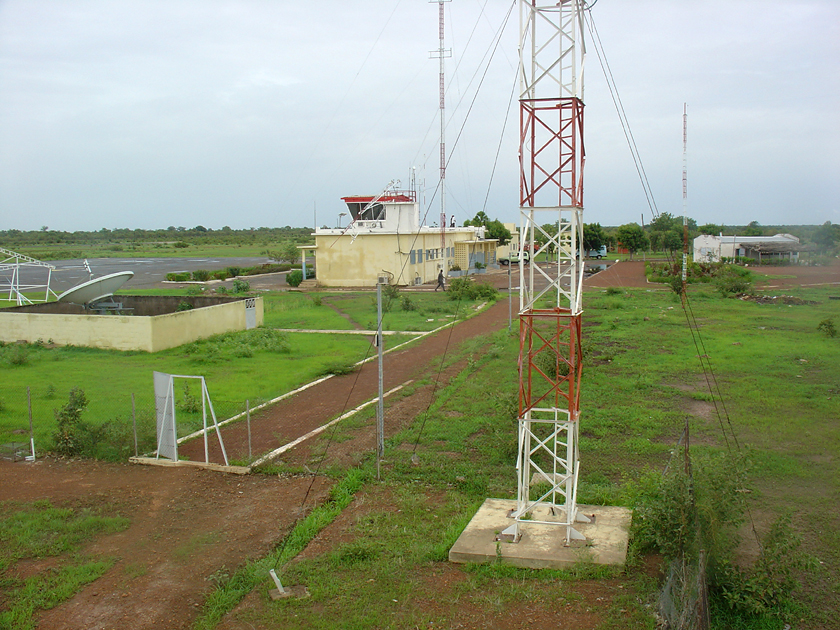
Airport telecommunication antennas and towers, with terminal in background, 2006.
