= Cap Skirring =

- Town
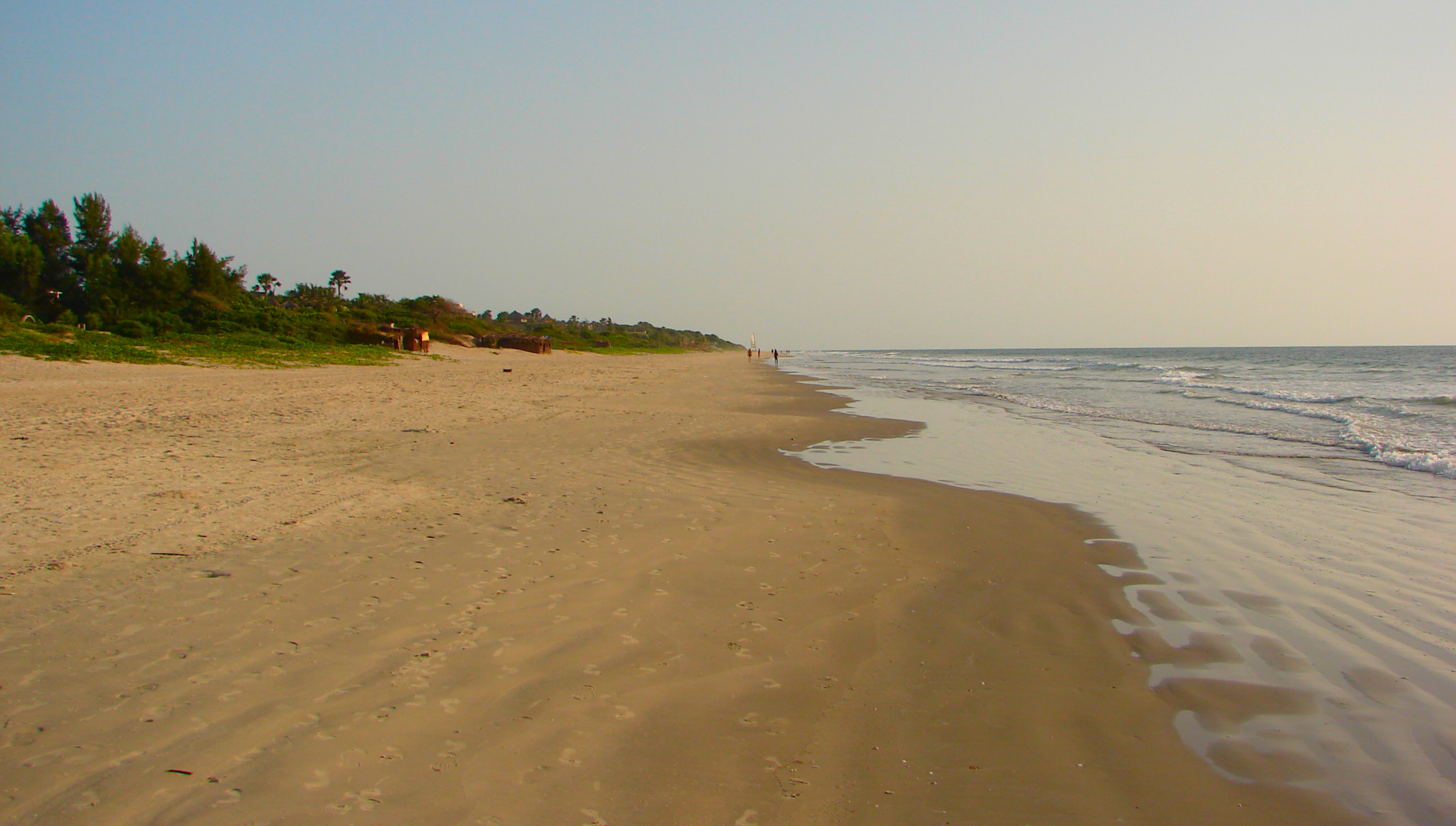
- The beach stretching south towards the border to Guinea-Bissau

- Location within Senegal
- Coordinates: 12°21′N 16°43′W
- Country: Senegal
- Region: Basse Casamance (Ziguinchor)
- Time zone: UTC+0 (GMT)

Cap Skirring, also spelled Cap Skiring, is a town on the Atlantic Ocean coast of the Basse Casamance (Ziguinchor) region of Senegal, near the border of Guinea-Bissau. It is a popular seaside resort with Europeans and has an airport and a golf course. The town was first occupied by fishermen. It was discovered by the French of Ziguinchor as a recreational beach zone in the 1960s. An airstrip for small planes was built at the end of 1960 by members of the Aero Club de Ziguinchor.

== Climate ==
Climate data for Cap Skirring (Cap Skirring Airport) (1991–2020)
Month	Jan	Feb	Mar	Apr	May	Jun	Jul	Aug	Sep	Oct	Nov	Dec	Year
Mean daily maximum °C (°F)	31.8 (89.2)	32.6 (90.7)	31.9 (89.4)	30.1 (86.2)	30.0 (86.0)	31.4 (88.5)	30.9 (87.6)	30.5 (86.9)	31.2 (88.2)	32.4 (90.3)	32.8 (91.0)	32.0 (89.6)	31.5 (88.7)
Mean daily minimum °C (°F)	17.9 (64.2)	18.3 (64.9)	19.0 (66.2)	19.9 (67.8)	21.9 (71.4)	24.4 (75.9)	24.5 (76.1)	24.3 (75.7)	23.8 (74.8)	24.2 (75.6)	22.3 (72.1)	19.1 (66.4)	21.6 (70.9)
Average precipitation mm (inches)	0.2 (0.01)	0.1 (0.00)	0.0 (0.0)	0.0 (0.0)	3.2 (0.13)	48.8 (1.92)	308.7 (12.15)	432.1 (17.01)	318.3 (12.53)	102.3 (4.03)	2.3 (0.09)	0.1 (0.00)	1,216.1 (47.88)
Average precipitation days (≥ 1.0 mm)	0.0	0.0	0.0	0.0	0.4	4.4	15.6	19.1	15.8	7.6	0.3	0.1	63.3
Source: NOAA
