= Bakel Airport =

Airport in Senegal

Coordinates: 14°50′50″N 12°28′06″W

- IATA: BXE; ICAO: GOTB

Summary
- Airport type: Public
- Operator: Government
- Serves: Bakel, Senegal
- Elevation AMSL: 98 ft (30 m)

Map
- Location within Senegal

Runways
Direction	Length		Surface
Direction	m	ft	Surface
07/25	1,750	5,741	Macadam
- Source: DAFIF

Bakel Airport (IATA: BXE, ICAO: GOTB) is an airport serving Bakel, a town in Bakel department, Tambacounda region, Senegal.
