= Blaise Diagne International Airport =

Airport serving Dakar, Senegal

Blaise Diagne International Airport Aéroport international Blaise-Diagne
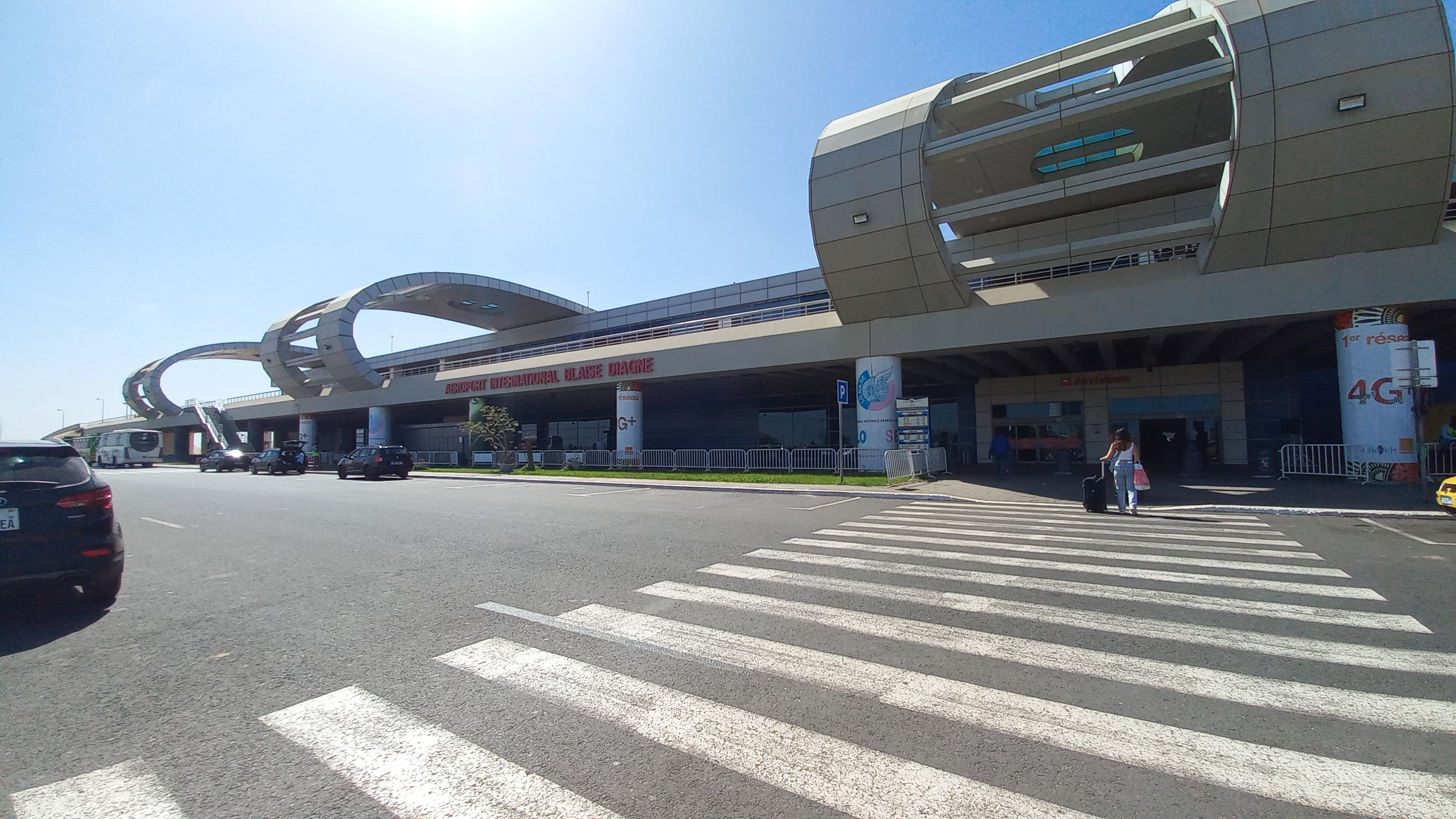
- IATA: DSS; ICAO: GOBD

Summary
- Airport type: Public
- Owner: Government of Senegal
- Operator: Summa-Limak
- Serves: Dakar
- Location: Ndiass, Thiès Region, Senegal
- Opened: 7 December 2017; 8 years ago
- Hub for: Air Senegal; Transair
- Elevation AMSL: 289.59 ft (88.27 m)
- Coordinates: 14°40′16″N 17°4′1″W
- Website: www.dakaraeroport.com

Map
- Location of airport in Senegal

Runways
Direction	Length		Surface
Direction	m	ft	Surface
01/19	3,500	11,483	Asphalt

Blaise Diagne International Airport (French: Aéroport international Blaise-Diagne), (IATA: DSS, ICAO: GOBD) is an international airport near the town of Diass in Thiès Region, Senegal, 43 km (27 mi) east of downtown Dakar. It is served by the Train Express Régional connecting the airport to Dakar.

It serves as the main airport for Dakar, replacing Léopold Sédar Senghor International Airport, which had become too small. It is named after Blaise Diagne, the first black African elected to France's parliament in 1914. Regular flights are operated to destinations across many parts of Africa, as well as to Europe, Macaronesia, the Middle East, the United States, and Canada.

== History ==
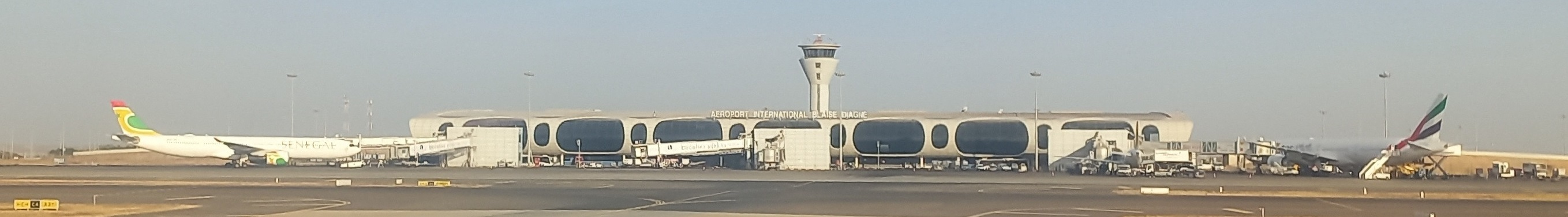
Apron view

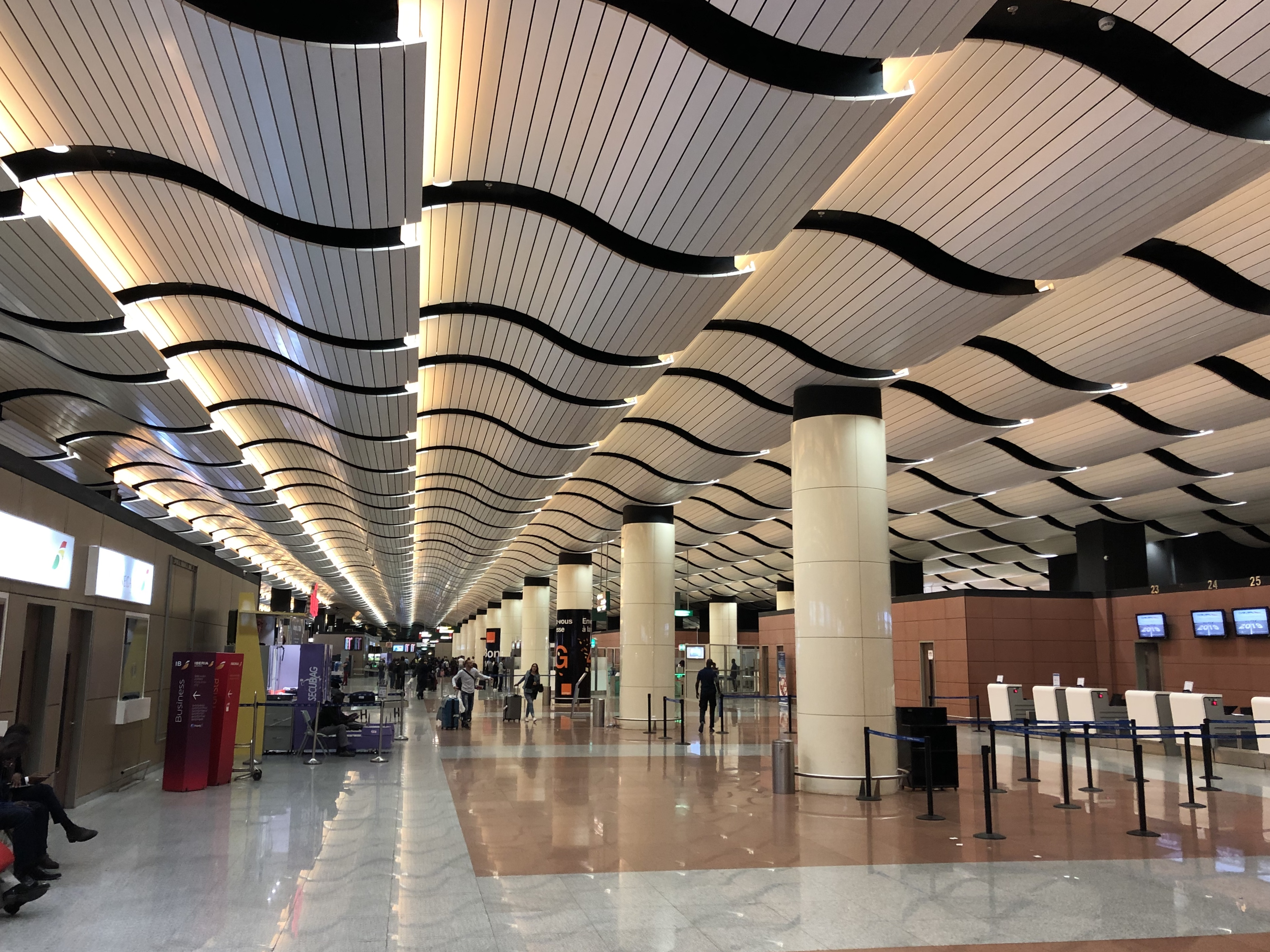
Departures Hall

The airport was originally expected to be operational at the end of the year 2011, but this date was pushed back by almost a year in September of that year. In September 2012, Senegalese Prime Minister Abdoul Mbaye announced that the airport would open in the first quarter of 2014. In January 2015, word spread that the airport would open in June 2015. On 4 April 2015, Reuters announced a new opening date for early 2016.

The expected building costs rose to 566 million euros, with over 400 million coming from the Saudi Binladin Group.

The airport then was finally opened for scheduled operations on 7 December 2017.

== Airlines and destinations ==
=== Passenger ===
The following airlines operate regular scheduled and charter flights at Dakar Blaise Diagne Airport:

Airlines	Destinations
Air Côte d'Ivoire	Bissau
Air France	Paris-Charles de Gaulle
Air Senegal	Niamey, Sal
Air Transat	Montréal–Trudeau
ASKY Airlines	Lomé
Binter Canarias	Gran Canaria
Brussels Airlines	Brussels
Delta Air Lines	New York–JFK
Emirates	Dubai–International
Ethiopian Airlines	Addis Ababa
ITA Airways	Rome–Fiumicino
Kenya Airways	Nairobi–Jomo Kenyatta
Luxair	Seasonal: Luxembourg
Neos	Milan–Malpensa
Royal Air Maroc	Casablanca
Smartwings	Seasonal charter: Prague
TAAG Angola Airlines	Luanda, Praia
TAP Air Portugal	Lisbon
Transavia	Marseille, Nantes; Seasonal: Bordeaux, Lille, Lyon, Nice, Toulouse
TUI Airways	Seasonal: London–Gatwick
TUI fly Deutschland	Düsseldorf
TUI fly Netherlands	Seasonal: Amsterdam
Turkish Airlines	Bissau (begin 8 June 2026), Istanbul
Vueling	Barcelona

=== Cargo ===
Airlines	Destinations
Air France Cargo	Paris–Charles de Gaulle
Air Charter Service	Clermont–Ferrand

== Ground transportation ==
The Train Express Regional Dakar-AIBD is a rail link between the airport and Dakar. The first phase, linking downtown Dakar and Diamniadio, opened on 27 December 2021. The second phase connecting to the airport opened on 28 September 2026.

== See also ==
- List of airports in Senegal
