= Buchanan, Liberia =

Buchanan Gbezohn (Bassa)
- City
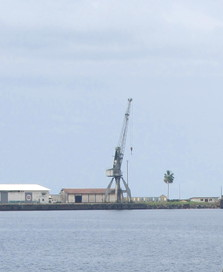
- Port of Buchanan

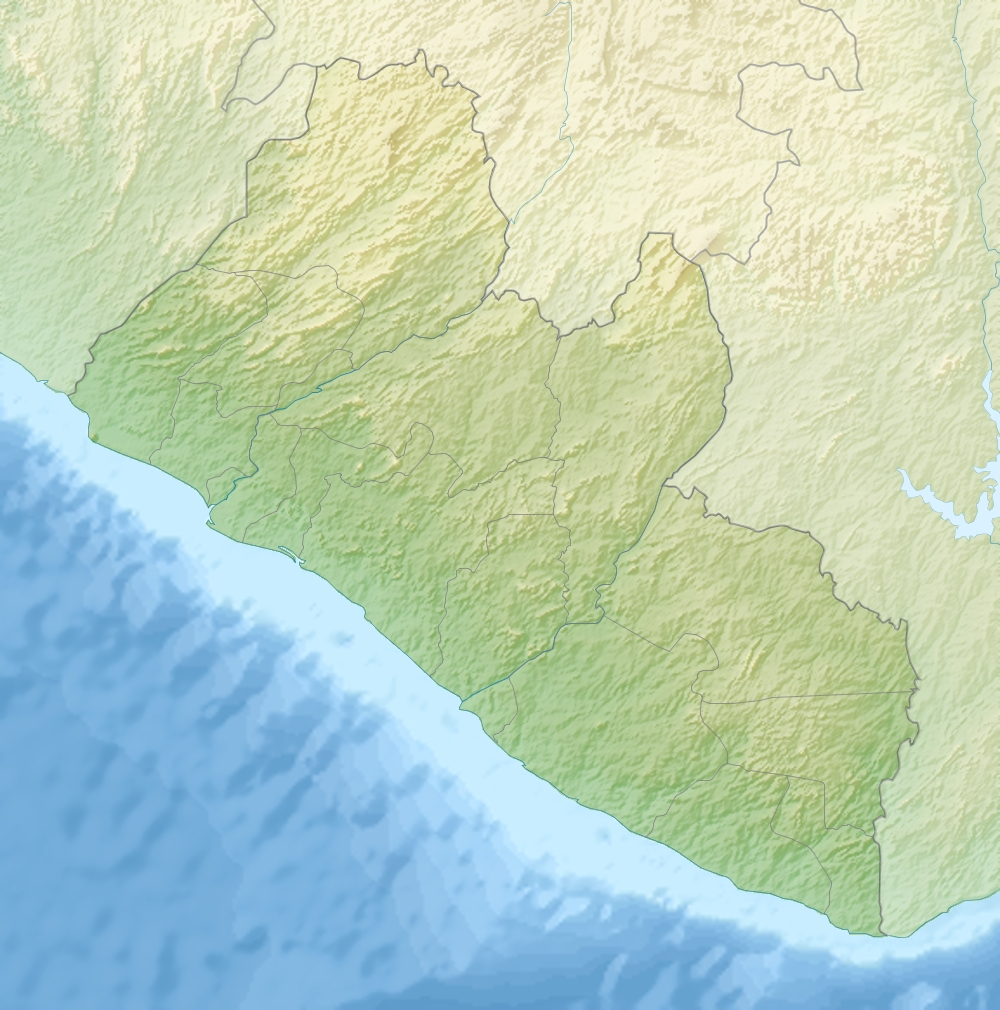
- Location in Liberia
- Coordinates: 05°52′51″N 10°02′48″W
- Country: Liberia
- County: Grand Bassa County
- District: Buchanan District
- Elevation: 253 ft (77 m)

Population (2008 census)
  - Total: 34,270
- Time zone: UTC+00:00 (GMT)
- Postal code: 4000
- Climate: Am

Buchanan (Bassa: Gbezohn), also previously known as Grand Bassa on some maps, is the third largest city in Liberia, lying on Waterhouse Bay, part of the Atlantic Ocean. As of the 2008 census, Buchanan had a population of 34,270. Of this, 16,984 were male and 17,286 female.

Named for Thomas Buchanan, cousin of U.S. president James Buchanan, and second governor of Liberia, it is also the capital of Grand Bassa County and lies 70 miles (110 km) southeast of Monrovia, near the mouth of the Saint John River. The town was a refuge during the First Liberian Civil War, as it largely escaped the fighting. Fishing is an important industry in the town. The town also has isolated beaches and lagoons.

== History ==
In December 1832, the Port Cresson colony was founded in what is now Buchanan by black Quakers from the New York and Pennsylvania colonization societies. It was established as a settlement for black emigrants from the United States. The emigrants named the settlement in honor of Elliott Cresson, a Philadelphia merchant and Pennsylvania Colonization Society founder who funded their voyage to Liberia.

On June 10, 1835, the Indigenous Bassa people destroyed the Americo-Liberian colony of Port Cresson, killing 10.

A month later, a new colony called Bassa Cove was founded by black Quakers of the Young Men's Colonization Society of Pennsylvania. The Bassa Cove colony was incorporated into Liberia on April 1, 1839.

Throughout much of the 1850s, Buchanan's population failed to grow, as deaths outnumbered births and only through immigration from the United States was the community able to avoid a substantial decline.

== Economy ==
Buchanan is the port for the 155 miles (250 km) railway that brings iron ore from the mines at Yekepa, Nimba County. Originally built by the now defunct Liberian-American-Swedish Minerals Company (LAMCO), the rail line has now (as of 2012) been revitalized by the Arcelor Mittal Company. Rubber and palm oil once were also shipped out of the Port of Buchanan. Africa's first iron-ore washing and pelletizing plant was opened in Buchanan in 1968. The plant was severely damaged during the first Liberian civil war. Stephen Ellis writes that during early 1994, ECOMOG "..Nigerian troops dismantled, and exported as second-hand plant or as scrap metal, industrial equipment worth some $50 million", which had remained intact when the port had earlier been occupied by the National Patriotic Front of Liberia, Charles Taylor's faction. It is reported that the plant was later sold off as scrap metal to a Chinese buyer in 2010.

Buchanan Renewable Energies, a firm based in Toronto, Canada, that processes chips from rubber tree trunks into biofuel, has begun operations in the city.

== Notable people ==
- Marcus Andreasson (born 1978), footballer
- Dessaline Harris (1895–1966), jurist
- Daniel Edward Howard (1861–1935), 16th President of Liberia
- Joakim Sundström (born 1965), sound designer and musician

== See also ==
- Doris Williams Stadium
- Railway stations in Liberia
