= Kédougou Airport =

- IATA: KGG; ICAO: GOTK

Summary
- Airport type: Public
- Operator: Government
- Location: Kédougou, Senegal
- Elevation AMSL: 584 ft (178 m)
- Coordinates: 12°34′20″N 012°13′13″W

Map
- Location within Senegal

Runways
Direction	Length		Surface
Direction	m	ft	Surface
11/29	1,800	5,906	Asphalt
- Source: DAFIF

Kédougou Airport (IATA: KGG, ICAO: GOTK) is an airport serving Kédougou, a town in the Tambacounda Region of Senegal.

== History ==
In 2019, Macky Sall announced the Kédougou Airport would be transformed into an international airport. Regular flights by Air Senegal were also in the pipeline. This transformation is part of the country's plan announced in 2018 to modernize its main airports and turn Senegal into a major hub in Western Africa.
