= Transport in Liberia =

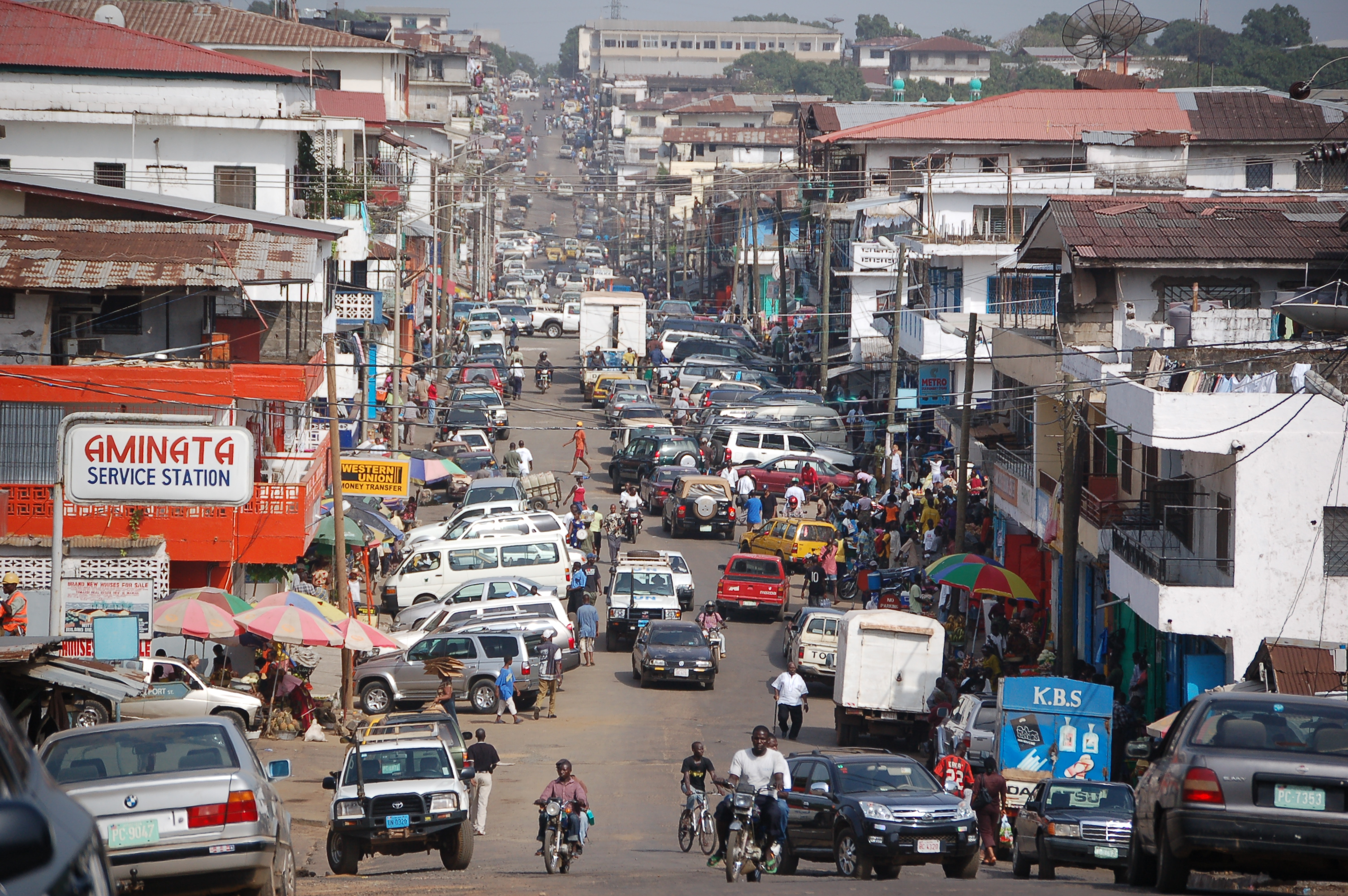
The streets of downtown Monrovia, March 2009

Transport in Liberia consists of 243 km (151 miles) of railways, 6,580 miles of highways (408 mi paved), seaports, 29 airports (2 paved) and 2 miles of pipeline for oil transportation. Railroads are almost exclusively for cargo. Buses and taxis are the main forms of ground transportation in and around Monrovia. Charter boats and ferries are also available.

== Railways ==
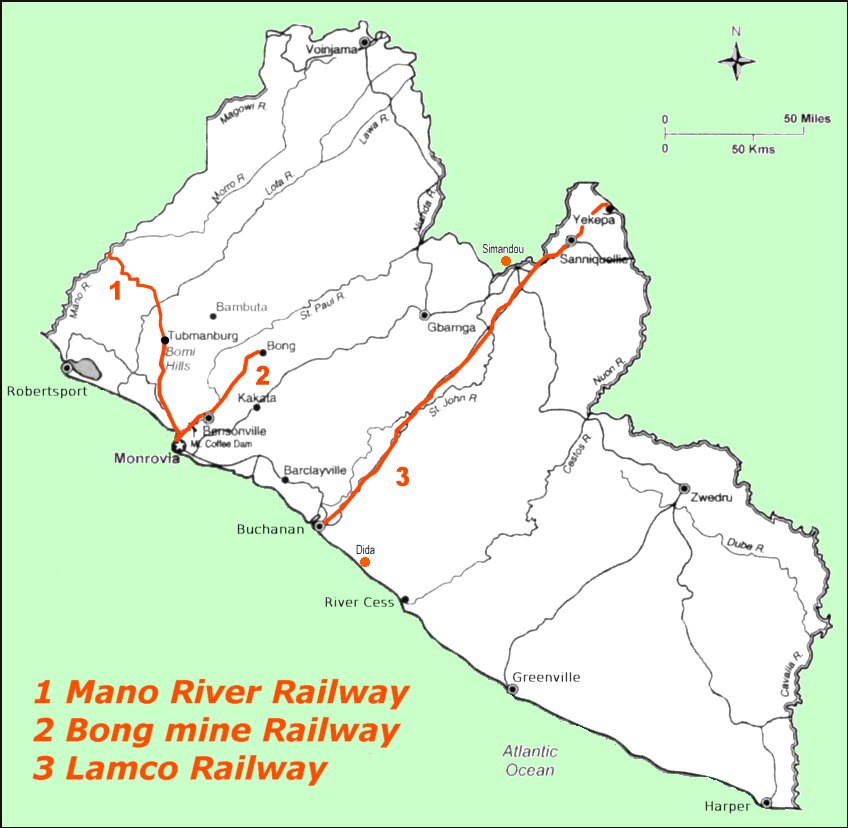
Map of the three railroads in Liberia

Three railways were built in Liberia to export ore from iron mines. All three opened in the 1960s, and all three were damaged and closed during the civil wars between 1989 and 2003. Two of the three re-opened to some degree after the war.

The first rail line, the Mano River Railway, opened in 1960. It was a 148-kilometre (92 mi) route from Monrovia to mines near the border with Sierra Leone. It closed in the early part of the First Liberian Civil War in 1989 and did not reopen.

The Bong Mine railway line began operation in 1964, but closed in 1992 due to the civil war. It runs for 77 kilometres (48 mi). By the late 2000s, the Bong mine railway was operating again. Service has come and gone since. In 2010, the railway was performing freight and passenger trips between Monrovia and the (former) mining town of Bong. By 2016, the railway and mine were both closed. As of 2026, mines were operating in Bong again, and so was the railroad.

The Lamco Railway began operation in 1963, and takes its name from the mining company that built it: the Liberian-American-Swedish Mining Company. It was partially rebuilt by ArcelorMittal and put back into service in 2011. As of 2025, this freight railway line runs for 243 kilometres (151 mi), from the port of Buchanan to mining regions around Yekepa, near the border with Guinea. There has been a proposal to extend the Lamco railway to serve a mine across the border in Guinea.

== Roadways ==
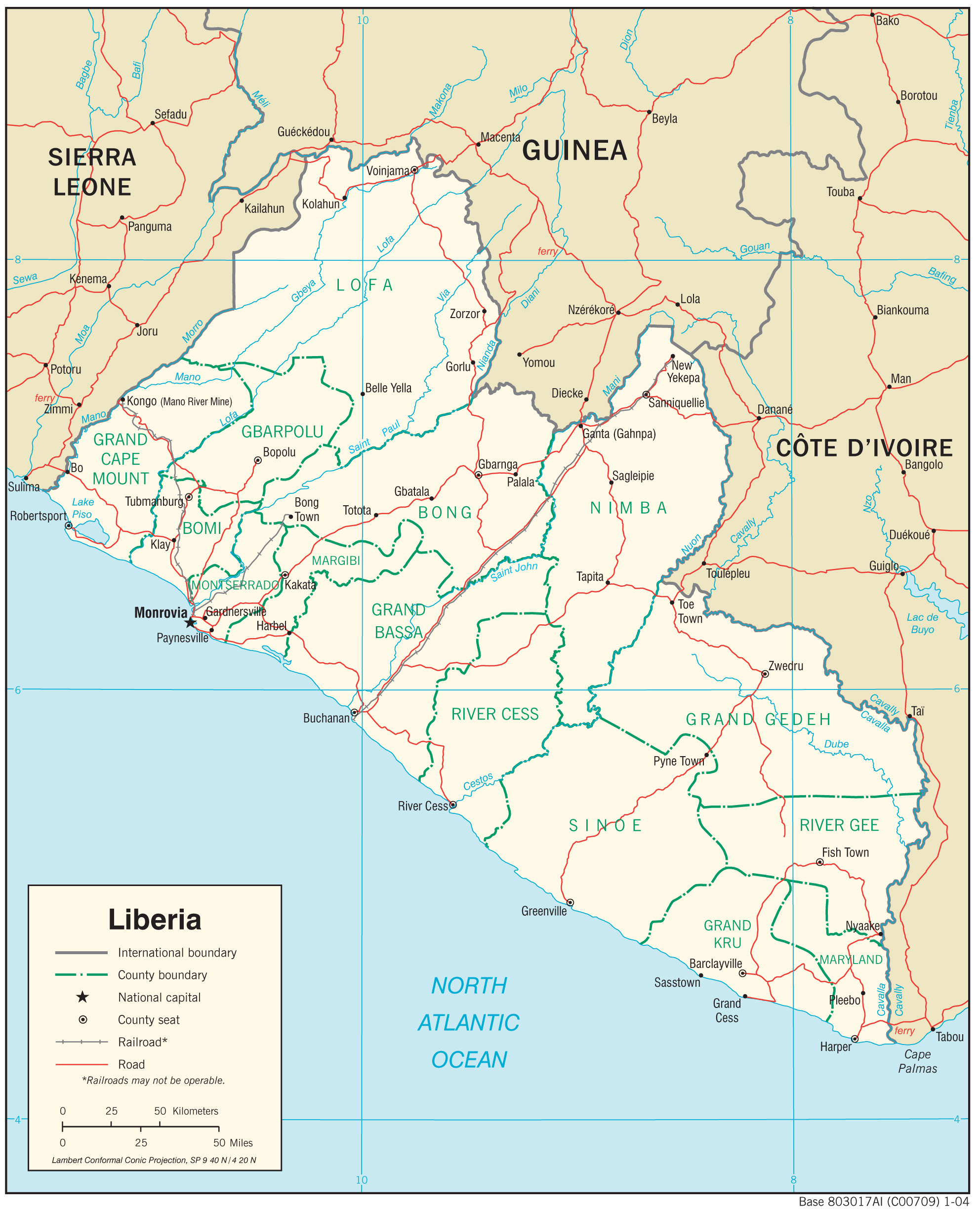
A map of Liberia's major roads and railways

Liberia's road network is relatively underdeveloped, though recent years have seen significant improvements. A 2016 road inventory found approximately 11,000 kilometres (6,800 mi) of roads in the country, though only around 550 km (340 mi) are paved. The paved roads are mostly in good condition, while the unpaved roads are mostly in poor condition, especially in rural and inland areas.

A 2018 analysis estimated that only 42% of the rural population had access to an all-season road within walking distance. However, this represented an increase of 8 percent, due in part to road improvement projects on the Monrovia-Buchanan and international Monrovia-Ganta-Guinea corridors. Road access remains highly variable across different parts of the country, and transport costs outside of major transport corridors are high (above 10 USD/ton).

The Trans–West African Coastal Highway, a multinational highway stretching along the western African coast from Senegal to Nigeria, passes through Liberia. Roadways connecting Liberia to its neighbors exist, but the highway is in a variable state of paving, quality, and usefulness. Once the highway is fully upgraded, it will cross the country, connecting it to Freetown (Sierra Leone), Abidjan (Ivory Coast), and eventually to 11 other nations of the Economic Community of West African States (ECOWAS).

== Ports and harbors ==
Liberia has four major commercial ports, and nearly all of Liberia's international trade takes place by sea. Around half of the Liberian population lives within 2 hours of one of these ports. Monrovia primarily handles imports, and Buchanan mostly handles exports. The port of Monrovia collects 70% of the country's customs revenue. Monrovia handles more than 95% of the country's imports, with petroleum products and food being two major import commodities there. Iron ore and clinker are major exports through the port.

The container and multi-purpose terminal at the Freeport of Monrovia is operated by APM Terminals under a 25-year concession signed with the Liberian government in 2011; the terminal has an annual capacity of about 200,000 TEU, and in July 2025 the port moved to 24-hour marine operations.

The port of Buchanan handles the second-most freight value in the country (1.7%), and most of the country's exports by weight. It is the railhead for the iron ore exports from the Lamco railway. As a result, 95% of the port's cargo is iron ore. The other two significant ports are Greenville and Harper, both of which are focused on lumber.

== Merchant marine ==
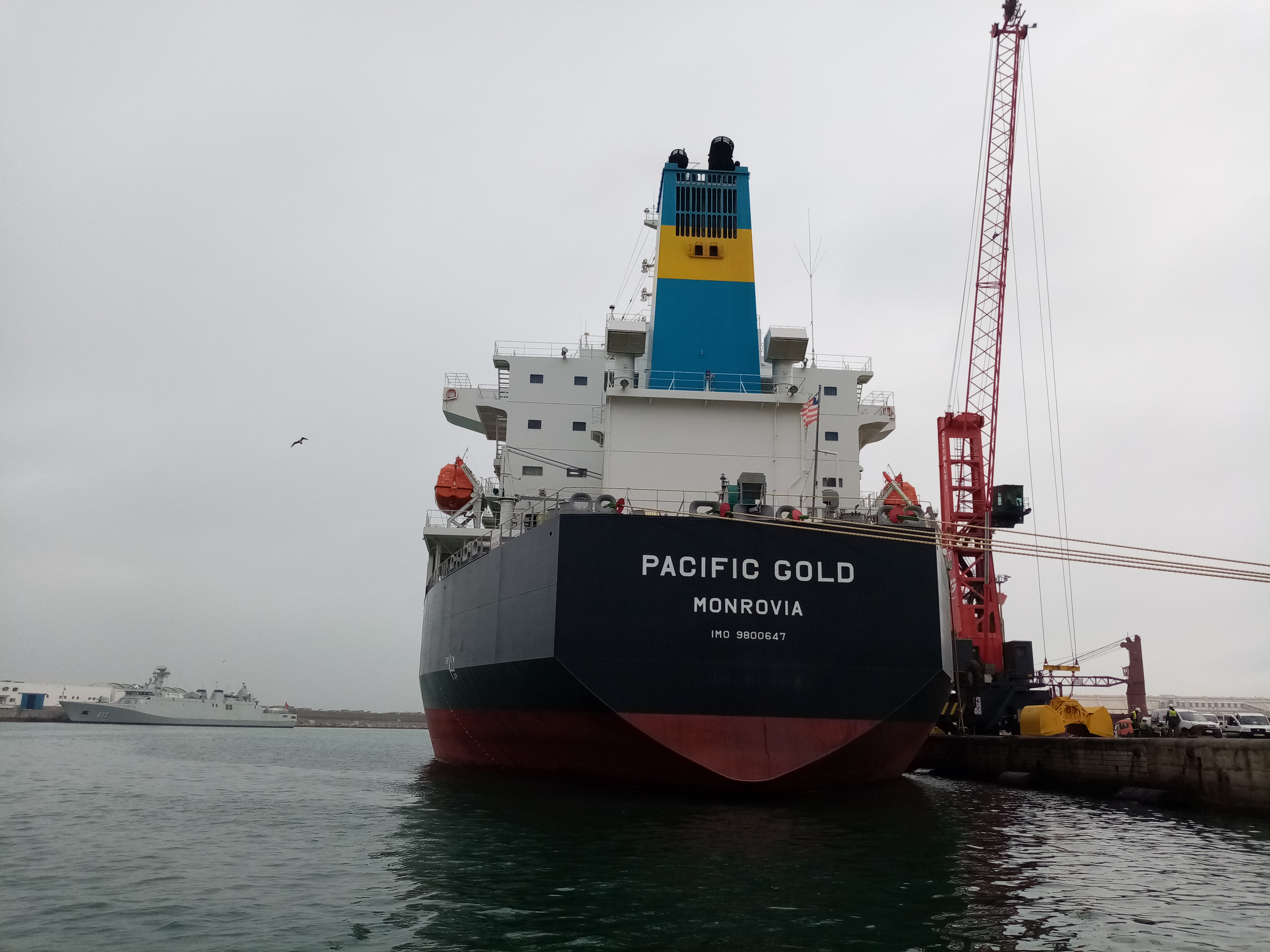
A tanker registered in Liberia

Liberia is an international flag of convenience for freight shipping, dating back to the late 1940s. By 1956, Liberia became the leading flag of convenience, surpassing Panama for the most registered ships and tonnage. By 1965, Liberia had the most registered shipping tonnage of any country in the world.

More than 5,000 ships are registered on the Liberian International Ship and Corporate Registry, representing 14% of the world's merchant fleet. The LISCR is a major source of money and diplomatic power for Liberia, but is operated out of the United States. The monetary benefits of the registry are substantial, accounting for around 25% of Liberian government revenue in the 2010s. At times during the Liberian civil wars, shipping registrations provided as much as 90% of the government's revenue. The LISCR receives a 25% portion of net profits, with the rest going to the Liberian government. Liberian law mandates that the registry be operated from the United States.

== Airports ==
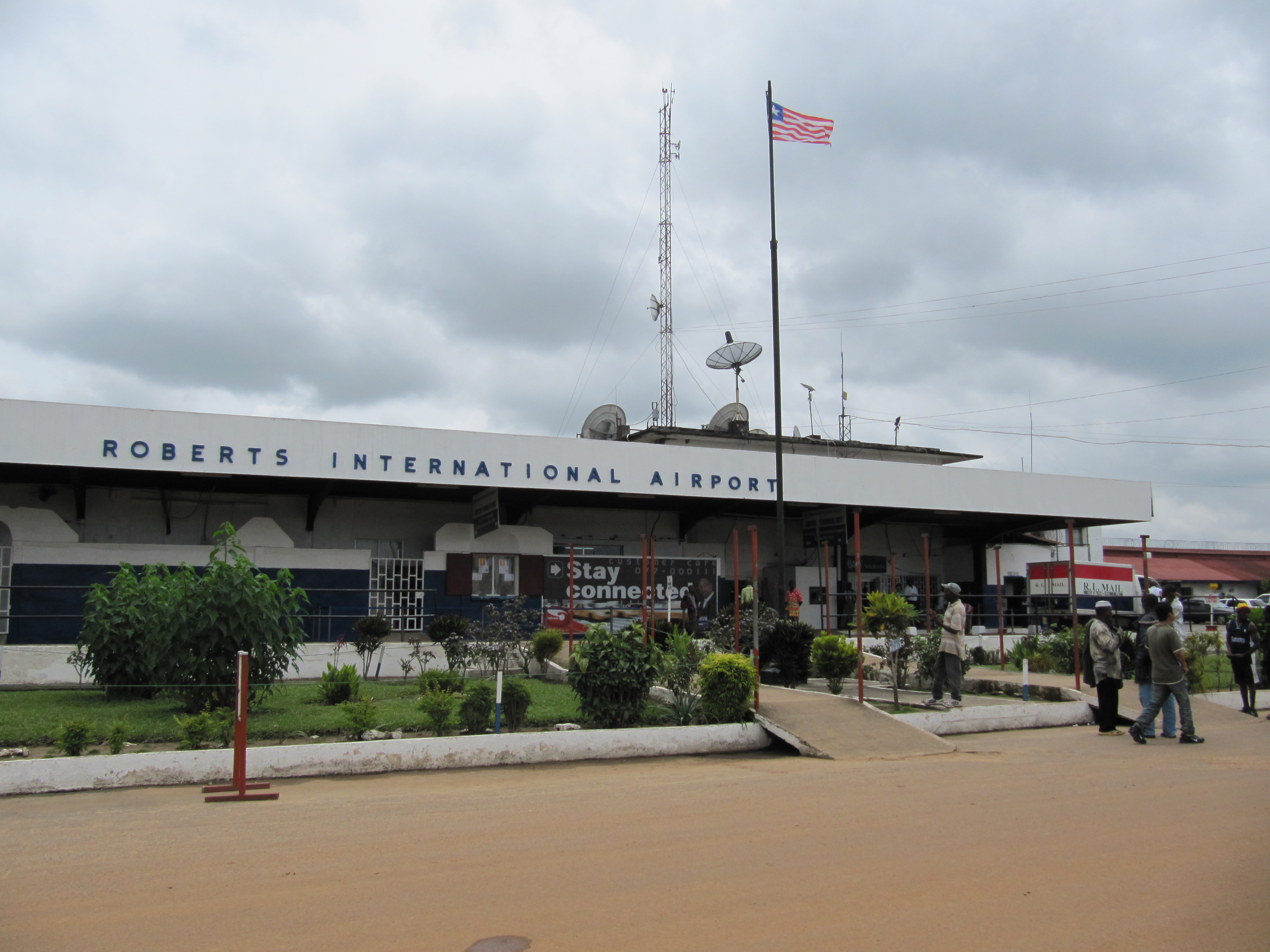
The exterior of Roberts International Airport in 2010

Small-scale air travel in Liberia dates back to the late 1920s, in part due to Firestone's development of rubber plantations within Liberia. During World War II, Liberia was well placed for intermediate stops between Allied airbases, and the United States government contracted with Pan Am to build a Liberian airfield for this purpose. The first major airfield in Liberia was built in closer proximity to Firestone's plantations than the capital, and when it was converted for civil aviation after the war, the road between Monrovia and the airfield went through Firestone's property.

The main international airport in the country is Roberts International Airport, located approximately 56 kilometres (35 miles) outside of Monrovia. It has a single 3,400 metres (11,200 ft) runway. The only other paved-runway airport in the country is Spriggs Payne Airport, located 5 kilometres (3.1 mi) outside of downtown Monrovia. There are numerous local airfields with unpaved runways spread throughout the country as well.

== See also ==
- Economy of Liberia
