= List of airports in Mali =

This is a list of airports in Mali, sorted by location.

== Airports ==
Airport names shown in bold indicate the airport has scheduled service on commercial airlines.

City served	ICAO	IATA	Airport name
Ansongo	GAAO		Ansongo Airport
Bafoulabe	GABF		Bafoulabe Airport
Bamako	GABS	BKO	**Modibo Keita International Airport**
Bandiagara	GABD		Bandiagara Airport
Bougouni	GABG		Bougouni Airport
Bourem	GABR		Bourem Airport
Douentza	GADZ		Douentza Airport
Goundam	GAGM	GUD	Goundam Airport
Gao	GAGO	GAQ	**Gao International Airport**
Kayes	GAKY	KYS	**Kayes Dag-Dag Airport**
Kenieba	GAKA	KNZ	Kenieba Airport
Kidal	GAKL		Kidal Airport
Kita	GAKT		Kita Airport
Kolokani	GAKN		Kolokani Airport
Koutiala	GAKO	KTX	Koutiala Airport
Manantali			Bengassi Airport
Markala	GAMA		Markala Airport
Ménaka	GAMK		Menaka Airport
Mopti	GAMB	MZI	**Mopti Airport**
Nara	GANK	NRM	Keibane Airport
Niafunké	GANF		Niafunké Airport
Nioro du Sahel	GANR	NIX	Nioro Airport
Sikasso	GASK	KSS	Sikasso Airport
Tessalit	GATS		Tessalit Airport
Timbuktu	GATB	TOM	**Timbuktu Airport**
Yélimané	GAYE	EYL	Yélimané Airport

== See also ==
- Transport in Mali
- List of airports by ICAO code: G#GA - Mali
- Wikipedia: WikiProject Aviation/Airline destination lists: Africa#Mali
