= Gargando =

- Town and Commune
- Location in Mali
- Coordinates: 16°28′N 4°11′W
- Country: Mali
- Region: Tombouctou Region
- Cercle: Goundam Cercle

Government
  - Mayor: Abdoulahi Ag Hamouna

Population (2009)
  - Total: 7,950
- Time zone: UTC+0 (GMT)

Gargando is a small town located in the Tombouctou Region of Mali. The people are mainly from subdivisions of the Kel Ansar tribe (which traces its origin to the Ansar of Medina). The village has many educated Touareg people.

The diaspora of Gargando people is spread throughout Mali and includes the Cherifène, the Kel Razaf, the Idanane, the Kel Tinakawate, the Kel Indierene, the Kel Emmimalane etc. The current chief of the Kel Antessar tribe, Mohamed Elmehdi Ag Attaher, comes from Gargando, although the geographical borders of the town do not correspond to the sociological classification of the inhabitants.

The Commune Rurale of Gargando was created by Law 96-059 of 4 November 1996. It is bordered on the north by the Commune Rurale of Adarmalane, on the northwest by the Commune Rurale of Râz-El-Mâ, on the northeast by the Commune of M'Bouna, on the east by the communes of Télé and Goundam, on the west by the Commune Rurale of Télemsi and that of Aljounoub, on the southwest by the communes of Djanké and Soumpi, on the south by the Commune of Soboundou, and on the southeast by the Commune Rurale of Tonka.

The population of the 2009 Census was 7,950. The population is Tamacheq.

National government is represented by the Sub-Prefect, the national health service by the Chief of the Medical Post, and the national education service by the directors of schools.
