= Bintagoungou attack =

2017 battle of the Mali War

- Part of Mali War
Date	June 17, 2017
Location	Bintagoungou, Tomboctou Region, Mali
Result	JNIM victory

Belligerents
Mali	Jama'at Nasr al-Islam wal Muslimin

Casualties and losses
5 killed 8 injured 4 missing 8 vehicles destroyed 1 vehicle captured	1 killed (per JNIM)

On June 17, 2017, jihadists from Jama'at Nasr al-Islam wal Muslimin attacked Malian forces in Bintagoungou, Tombouctou Region, Mali.

== Prelude ==
Jama'at Nasr al-Islam wal Muslimin formed in early 2017 as a coalition of five separate jihadist groups that rebelled against the Malian government in 2012. On June 1, 2017, several weeks prior to the Bintagoungou attack, the group ambushed Malian soldiers at Tikerefinadji, killing three soldiers and injuring three more.

== Attack ==
The attack began around 5am local time at the Malian military base in Bintagoungou. The jihadists arrived at the camp with three pick-ups, which they parked on the outskirts before walking silently by foot to the camp itself. After the jihadists stabbed a sentry, the main assault began. In the fighting, the camp's ammo depot was burned, eight vehicles were burned, and one was captured. Reinforcements from Goundam arrived around 8am, by which point the jihadists had already fled.

== Aftermath ==
The Malian army stated in a press release that same day that five soldiers were killed in the attack, eight were injured, and eight vehicles were destroyed. The injured soldiers were evacuated to Timbuktu by MINUSMA. Four other soldiers were reported missing. The attack was claimed by JNIM on June 21, who stated they had only lost one fighter.
