= Niafunke =

Niafunke may refer to:

- Niafunké Cercle, an administrative subdivision of the Tombouctou Region of Mali
  - Niafunké, a town in Mali
  - Niafunké Airport
- Niafunké (album), an album by Ali Farka Touré
