= Wanna ambush =

2016 militant attack on Malian forces in Goundam Cercle

- Part of Mali War
Date	January 15, 2016
Location	Between Wanna and Zenzen, Goundam Cercle, Mali
Result	Malian victory

Belligerents
Mali	Unknown

Casualties and losses
2 killed 3 injured	4 killed 3 captured
- 6 civilians killed

On January 15, 2016, unknown militants ambushed Malian forces near Wanna, in Goundam Cercle, Mali.

== Background ==
Goundam Cercle in 2015 was a hub of jihadist activity, in particular by Ansar Dine and Al-Qaeda in the Islamic Maghreb. In July 2015, jihadists led by AQIM ambushed Burkinabe troops in MINUSMA near the village of Takoumbaout, in Goundam cercle. On the day of the Wanna ambush, Malian soldiers were attacked in Dioura, killing one.

== Ambush ==
On the morning of January 15, 2016, a Malian convoy left Timbuktu towards Léré, a town near the Mauritanian border, to provide the town with food and equipment for internally displaced Malians. The convoy was ambushed near the villages of Wanna and Zenzen, thirty-three kilometers from Goundam, on the road leading to Tonka.

A few hours after the attack, the Malian Ministry of Defense announced that four jihadists and two Malian soldiers were killed during the ambush, and three soldiers were injured and three jihadists were captured. Azawadian media stated six Tuareg civilians were killed by Malian soldiers in a reprisal attack for the ambush. No group claimed responsibility for the attack, and no group was accused of the attack by the Malian government. Initially, a Malian military source said they "did not know" who the attackers were.
