= Issa Bery =

- Commune
- Location in Mali
- Coordinates: 16°43′20″N 3°46′51″W
- Country: Mali
- Region: Tombouctou Region
- Cercle: Goundam Cercle
- Admin HQ (Chef-lieu): Toucabangou

Area
  - Total: 26,220 km^{2} (10,120 sq mi)

Population (2009 census)
  - Total: 2,983
  - Density: 0.1138/km^{2} (0.2947/sq mi)
- Time zone: UTC+0 (GMT)

Issa Bery (also Issa Beri and Issabéry) is a commune of the Cercle of Goundam in the Tombouctou Region of Mali. The administrative center (chef-lieu) is the village of Toucabangou which is on the south shore of Lake Faguibine. The commune includes areas of land both to the south and to the north of the lake.
