= Theim mosque massacre =

2021 mosque shooting in Niger

- Part of Jihadist insurgency in Niger
- Location: Theim, Tillaberi Region, Niger
- Date: August 20, 2021
- Deaths: 17
- Injuries: Unknown
- Perpetrator: Unknown

On August 20, 2021, Assailants attacked a mosque in Theim, Tillabéri Region, Niger, killing at least seventeen people. The massacre occurred several days after the August 2021 Darey-Daye massacre, where militants killed over 37 people.

== Background ==
At the start of 2021, the Islamic State – Sahel Province, a predominantly Fulani organization based in the tri-border area between Mali, Niger, and Burkina Faso, began attacking civilian areas, especially with non-Fulani populations. The first major attack was the Tchoma Bangou and Zaroumdareye massacres that killed 105 people, and later the March 2021 Darey-Daye massacre. On August 16, ISGS fighters killed over 37 people in Darey-Daye again, along with killing thirty-three Malian soldiers during the battle of Tessit.

== Massacre ==
The militants opened fire on civilians in Theim who were performing Friday prayers on August 20. The town's mayor, Halido Zerbo, gave a death toll of sixteen while a Nigerien security source stated the death toll was seventeen. No group claimed responsibility for the attack, although ISGS is active in the area.
