= Essakane =

- Commune and village
- Location within Mali
- Coordinates: 16°46′57″N 3°37′58″W
- Country: Mali
- Region: Tombouctou Region
- Cercle: Goundam Cercle
- Commune: Essakane

Area
  - Total: 7,927 km^{2} (3,061 sq mi)

Population (2009 Census)
  - Total: 11,238
  - Density: 1.418/km^{2} (3.672/sq mi)

Essakane is a rural commune and village of the Cercle of Goundam in the Tombouctou Region of Mali. The commune includes around 16 small settlements. The small village of Essakane is around 70 kilometers west of the town of Timbuktu. The commune includes Lake Faguibine and two depressions, Lake Kamango and Lake Gouber, which fill with water in years when the annual flood of the Niger River is particularly extensive.

Between 2001 and 2009 Essakane was the site of an annual music festival held in January called the Festival au Désert (Festival in the Desert). Because of the difficulty of guaranteeing the security of foreign tourists, in 2010 and 2011 the Malian Government moved the festival to the outskirts of Timbuktu. The festival showcases the music of the local Tuareg people, as well as musicians from other nearby nations such as Mauritania and Niger.
