= Tassiga =

- Village
- Location in Mali
- Coordinates: 15°28′25″N 0°42′35″E
- Country: Mali
- Region: Gao Region
- Cercle: Ansongo Cercle
- Commune: Bourra
- Elevation: 247 m (810 ft)
- Time zone: UTC+0 (GMT)

Tassiga is a village and seat of the Commune of Bourra in the Cercle of Ansongo in the Gao Region of south-eastern Mali. The village lies on the left (east) bank of the Niger River, 37 km southeast of the town of Ansongo.
