= Agouni =

- Village
- Location in Mali
- Coordinates: 17°3′15″N 2°59′50″W
- Country: Mali
- Region: Tombouctou Region
- Cercle: Timbuktu Cercle
- Commune: Salam
- Time zone: UTC+0 (GMT)

Agouni is a village and seat of the commune of Salam in the Cercle of Timbuktu in the Tombouctou Region of Mali.
