= Tin-Hama ambush =

Coordinates: 15.9167°N 2.4000°E

Ambush of Tin-Hama
- Part of 2012 Northern Mali conflict
- Tin-Hama ambush (Mali)
Date	25 March 2012
Location	Tin-Hama, Mali
Result	Indecisive: Ganda Izo leader killed; Both parties claim victory

Belligerents
Azawad; MNLA; Tuareg volunteers	Mali: Ganda Iso

Commanders and leaders
(Azawad) Mbarek Ag Akly	(Mali) Amadou Diallo †

Strength
400 men 46 pick-up trucks	100 men 13 pick-up trucks

Casualties and losses
18–21 killed (according to Ganda Izo)	6 killed 5 wounded (according to Ganda Izo); 16 killed 1 captured 2 vehicles captured (according to the MNLA)

The Ambush of Tin-Hama took place during the Tuareg rebellion of 2012, on March 25, 2012, when a convoy of the Ganda Izo militia was ambushed by the MNLA.

== The Battle ==
On March 25, 2012, while the city of Ansongo was threatened by the rebels, the Ganda Iso militia was tasked by the central Government to go to reinforce the Army there. During their trip to reach Ansongo, the militiamen were placed at the forefront with 13 vehicles. But, having arrived near a pond, 5 kilometers from Tin-Hama and 45 kilometers from Ansongo, the militiamen were ambushed by the MLNA rebels led by Mbarek Ag Akly. After the clash, the Ganda Izo claimed that its losses were six dead, including Amadou Seydou Diallo, leader of the militia, as well as five wounded, two of whom seriously. Malians estimated the rebel losses at 18 dead; however, a reinforcing mission led by Alhousseyni Sali Barazi Toure founded the existence of 21 graves in the rebel side. In its statement, written by Bakaye Ag Hamed Ahmed, the MNLA states that 16 Malian soldiers were killed, including militia leader Amadou Diallo, another is taken prisoner and two vehicles full of ammunition were captured. The rebels also said that no Islamist fought with them. Both sides claimed victory, with the MNLA claiming thar the convoy was destroyed while Ganda Izo's militia claim that the Rebels had higher losses.
