= Koumaira =

Koumaïra
- Commune and village
- Location in Mali
- Coordinates: 15°47′11″N 3°51′51″W
- Country: Mali
- Region: Tombouctou Region
- Cercle: Niafunké Cercle

Area
  - Total: 476 km^{2} (184 sq mi)
- Elevation: 265 m (869 ft)

Population (2009 census)
  - Total: 14,839
  - Density: 31.2/km^{2} (80.7/sq mi)
- Time zone: UTC+0 (GMT)

Koumaïra is a rural commune and village of the Cercle of Niafunké in the Tombouctou Region of Mali. The village is on the south bank of the Bara-Issa, a branch of the Niger River that flows when the river is in flood. It lies 21 km south east of the town of Niafunké and 65 km north east of Lake Debo. The commune contains around 36 small settlements.
