= Toya, Tombouctou =

Toya
- Village
- Location in Mali
- Coordinates: 16°39′25″N 3°02′52″W
- Country: Mali
- Region: Tombouctou Region
- Cercle: Timbuktu Cercle
- Commune: Alafia
- Time zone: UTC+0 (GMT)

Toya is a village and seat of the commune of Alafia in the Cercle of Timbuktu in the Tombouctou Region of Mali. The village sits on the northern bank of the River Niger.
