= Ouattagouna =

- Commune and town
- Location in Mali
- Coordinates: 15°11′03″N 0°43′18″E
- Country: Mali
- Region: Gao Region
- Cercle: Ansongo Cercle

Government
  - Mayor: Amadou Harouna Maiga

Area
  - Commune and town: 4,093 km^{2} (1,580 sq mi)

Population (2009 census)
  - Commune and town: 30,519
  - Metro: 3,591
- Time zone: UTC+0 (GMT)

Ouattagouna or Ouatagouna is a small town and commune in the Cercle of Ansongo in the Gao Region of south-eastern Mali.

== Geography and climate ==
Located in the extreme south of the Ansongo Cercle and the region, the commune of Ouattagouna was established by Law No. 096-059, on 4 November 1996. It is bounded to the north by the communes of Boura and Tin-Hama, south by the prefecture Tillabery of Niger, to the east by the town of Tin-Hama and Ménaka and west by the municipality of Tessit. It covers an area of 4093 square kilometers. A considerable amount of the commune lies in the Ansongo-Ménaka animal reserve, especially east of the main town. It is managed by 23 elected representatives including one woman, three in the cercle and one in the Regional Assembly headed by a Mayor, three assistants, a secretary general, a manager and a guard.

The relief of Ouattagouna is very rugged with a few hills located near Ankoum Migno and El Mack (Bintia in Hausa). Several rocky cliffs along the valley flanks the Niger River. The climate is Sahelian and is characterized by three distinct seasons, dry and cold from October to March; a hot season from April to May; and a rainy season from June to September. The commune experiences prevailing harmattan dry winds blowing for eight to nine months followed by the monsoon which is a humid wind blowing from July to September.

The average rainfall ranges from 250 to 300 mm per year and the temperature fluctuates between 10 °C and 30 °C. However rainfall may fluctuate, for instance from 1997 to 2002, the total ranged from 129.5 mm in 10 days in 1997 and 429.2 mm in 1999. In 2002 it was 208.4 mm in an 18-day period against 307 mm in 23 days in 2001 and 383.3 mm in 24 days in 2004 etc. The Niger River passes through the commune for about 50 kilometres. Several wadis runoff into the river including the Kamgala, Soror, Bolilam in Hausa, then that of Imminan in the Gourma.

The commune of Ouattagouna contains several small lakes, the most important being Afrag, Barguvi, Tamakazène, Soror Koutou, Tirrazir, Tikoubaradène, Tangouba, Tin Chiguéren, Tinibit, Petan Tibanguir, Gardabani, Tabakatt, Darous Bangou and others. Vegetation is mainly influenced by climate and is composed primarily of savannah grassland. The land is characterised by very deep clay and sandy soils, suitable for agriculture and growing vegetables along the Niger River, and the soils can give a red-brown color in sub-arid regions.

== Wildlife ==
The "Ansongo-Ménaka Nature Reserve", established in the years 1956–1960, takes up much of the land in the commune of Ouattagouna. The reserve was created to protect a variety of wildlife including elephants, giraffes, gazelles, panthers, lions, tigers, hyenas, oryx, ostriches, turtles, boas, porcupines, hippos, ducks, herons, geese, jackals, monkeys, hyenas, manatees, crocodiles, and lizards. Also, the presence of the rich fauna has led to the construction of a tourist camp Fafa but poaching and bush fires have threatened conservation in the region. The commune has a notable abundance of fish and the town has a high rate of fish production. However, common drought, flooding, and over-exploitation of fish stocks have seen catches fall sharply in quantity and quality in recent years.

=== Villages ===
The commune contains the following settlements:

Village	Population (2004)	Coordinates
Bentia	2248	15°20′33″N 0°45′22″W
Bangabe	2441	15°14′51″N 0°58′2″W
Frag Frag	385	15°16′25″N 0°50′23″W
Fafa	3403	15°19′22″N 0°44′48″W
Kamouga	395	15°06′07″N 0°55′15″W
Kel Arokass	631	15°11′17″N 0°54′07″W
Kel Soughane	666	15°07′49″N 0°55′32″W
Karou	2916	15°07′45″N 0°40′42″W
Labbézanga	2580	14°58′10″N 0°42′12″W
Melleguezene	60	15°24′13″N 0°45′28″W
Ouattagouna	3591	15°11′03″N 0°43′18″W
Peulh Ixanane	720	15°06′06″N 0°44′58″W
Do Frag-Frag	704	15°12′24″N 0°50′55″W
Kel Eguitte	603	15°06′48″N 1°0′40″W
Kel Gueguelene	162	15°01′11″N 0°47′27″W
Kel Tamadas	514	15°19′49″N 0°42′11″W
