= Télé, Mali =

Télé
- Commune
- Location in Mali
- Coordinates: 16°35′23″N 3°43′32″W
- Country: Mali
- Region: Tombouctou Region
- Cercle: Goundam Cercle
- Admin HQ (Chef-lieu): Hangabéra

Area
  - Total: 261 km^{2} (101 sq mi)

Population (2009 census)
  - Total: 2,078
  - Density: 7.96/km^{2} (20.6/sq mi)
- Time zone: UTC+0 (GMT)

Télé is a rural commune of the Cercle of Goundam in the Tombouctou Region of Mali. The administrative center (chef-lieu) is the village of Hangabéra. The village lies to the east of Lake Télé and 20 km north of the small town of Goundam. Lake Télé is connected to the Niger River by a system of channels. When the river floods in September water flows into the southern end of the lake. Lake Télé is connected at its northern end to Lake Takara. The river water flows out of Lake Takara, across a rocky sill at Kamaïna and eventually reaches Lake Faguibine.

The commune contains four settlements:

- Bougoumeira
- Dendéguère
- Fatakara
- Hangabéra

Fatakara and Dendéguère are on the west side of Lake Télé. Hangabéra and Bougoumeira are to the east of the lake.
