= Sonima =

- Village
- Country: Mali
- Region: Tombouctou Region
- Cercle: Goundam Cercle
- Commune: Alzouonoub
- Time zone: UTC+0 (GMT)

Sonima is a village and seat of the commune of Alzouonoub in the Cercle of Goundam in the Tombouctou Region of Mali.
