= Saraféré =

- Village
- Location in Mali
- Coordinates: 15°49′22″N 3°41′55″W
- Country: Mali
- Region: Tombouctou Region
- Cercle: Niafunke Cercle
- Commune: Fittouga
- Time zone: UTC+0 (GMT)

Saraféré is a village and seat of the commune of Fittouga in the Cercle of Niafunke in the Tombouctou Region of Mali. The village lies on the Barra-Issa, the smaller and more easterly branch of the Niger River in the Inner Niger Delta.

== Visit by Edmond Fortier ==
The French photographer, Edmond Fortier, visited the village in 1905-1906 and published a series of postcards.

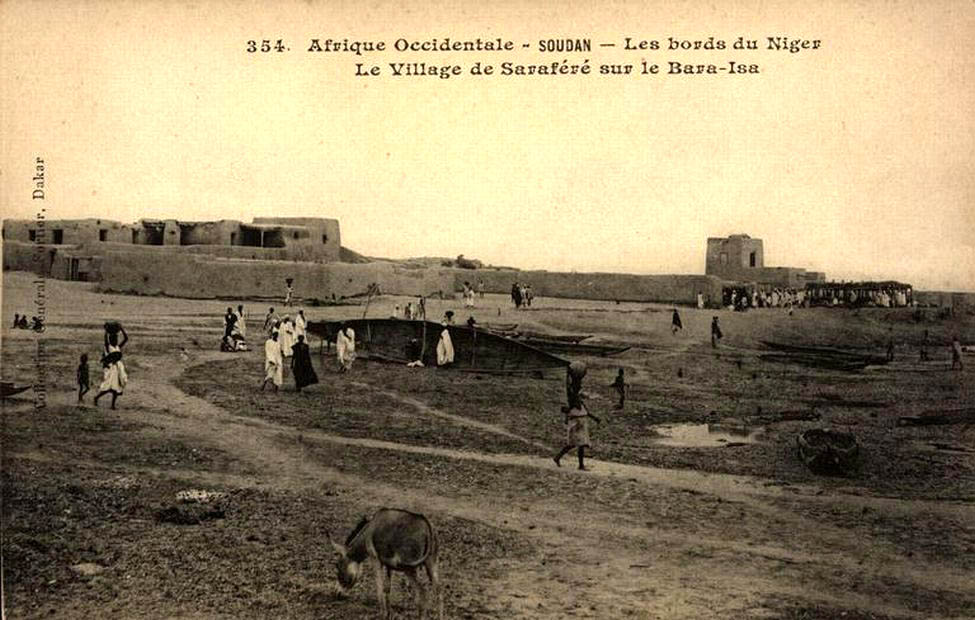
View of the village

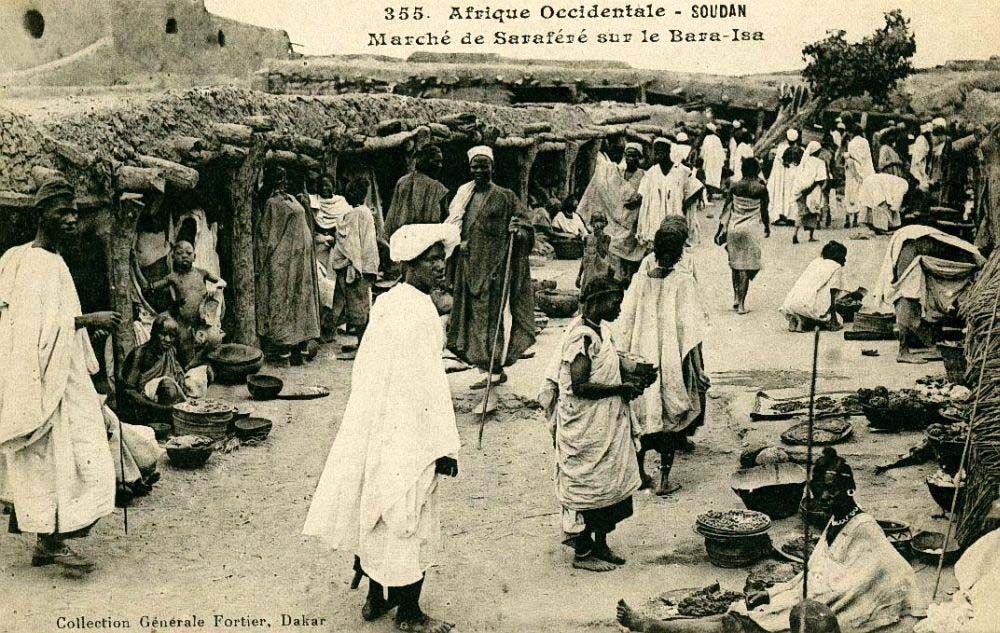
Street market

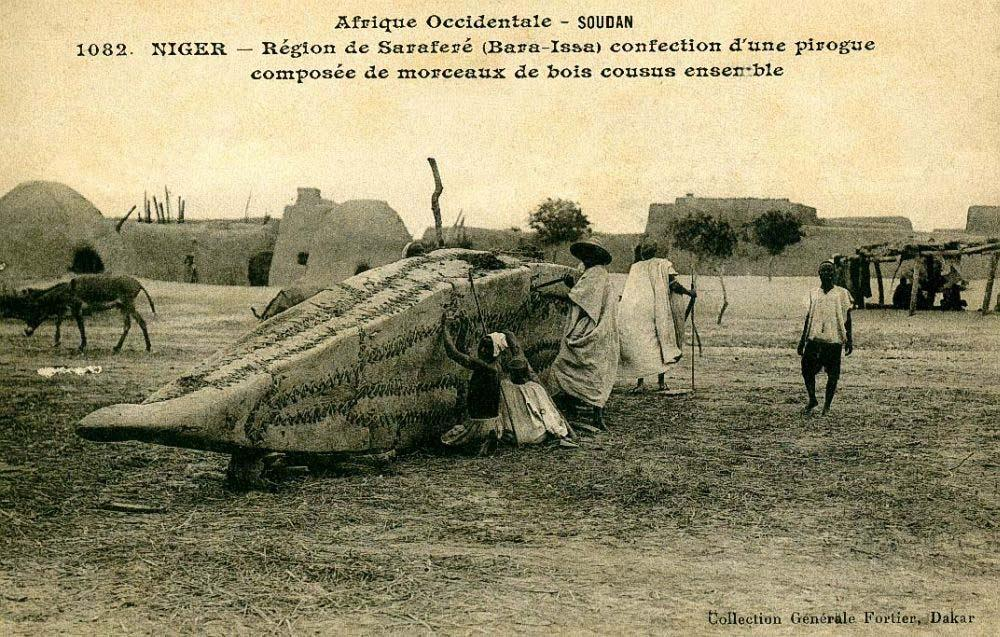
Building a pirogue

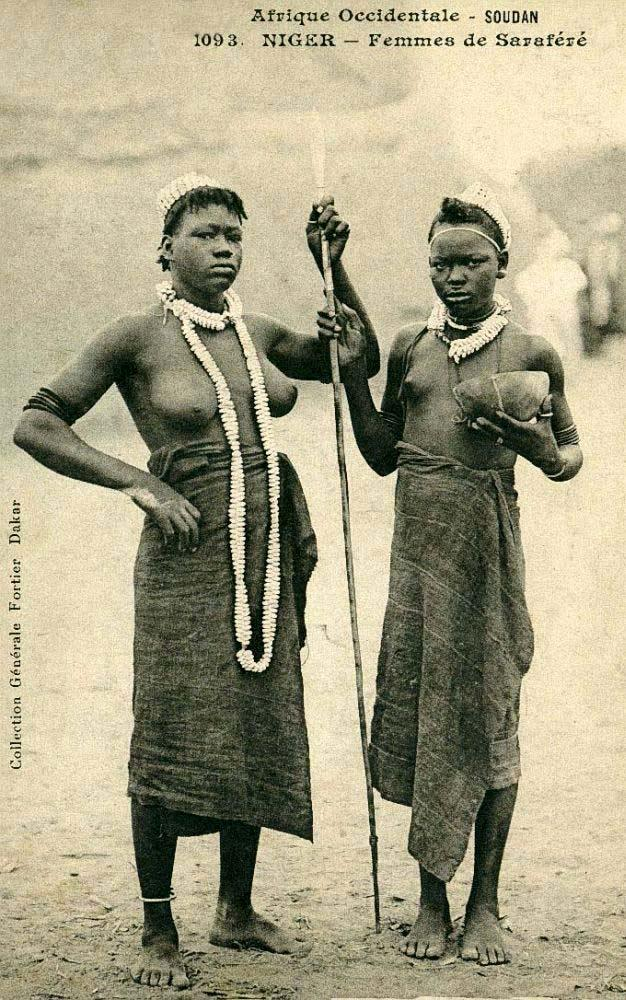
Two women
