= Fittouga =

- Commune
- Location in Mali
- Coordinates: 15°49′22″N 3°41′55″W
- Country: Mali
- Region: Tombouctou Region
- Cercle: Niafunké Cercle
- Admin HQ (Chef-lieu): Saraféré

Area
  - Total: 976 km^{2} (377 sq mi)

Population (2009 census)
  - Total: 30,627
- Time zone: UTC+0 (GMT)

Fittouga is a rural commune of the Cercle of Niafunké in the Tombouctou Region of Mali. The commune contains about 64 small settlements. The administrative center (chef-lieu) is the village of Saraféré which is 35 km south east of the town of Niafunké.
