= Aglal =

- Village
- Location in Mali
- Coordinates: 16°37′4″N 2°40′56″W
- Country: Mali
- Region: Tombouctou Region
- Cercle: Timbuktu Cercle
- Commune: Lafia
- Time zone: UTC+0 (GMT)

Aglal is a village and seat of the commune of Lafia in the Cercle of Timbuktu in the Tombouctou Region of Mali.
