= Alzounoub =

Coordinates: 16°11′N 4°51′W

- Commune
- Interactive map of Alzounoub
- Country: Mali
- Region: Tombouctou Region
- Cercle: Goundam Cercle

Area
  - Total: 3,032 sq mi (7,853 km^{2})

Population (1998)
  - Total: 2,923
- Time zone: UTC+0 (GMT)

Alzounoub is a commune of the Cercle of Goundam in the Tombouctou Region of Mali. The seat lies at Sonima. As of 1998 the commune had a population of 2,923. It covers an area of 7853 km².
