= Tessit massacres =

- Part of JNIM-ISGS war and Mali War
- Location: Keygourouten, Khadji, Bakal, Tadjalalt, and Abagazgaz, Tessit commune, Menaka Region, Mali
- Date: February 8-10, 2022
- Target: Civilians
- Deaths: 40+
- Victim: 1,200 displaced
- Perpetrator: Islamic State in the Greater Sahara
- Motive: Alleged sympathies with JNIM

Between February 8 and 10, 2022, militants from the Islamic State in the Greater Sahara killed at least 40 civilians in the villages of Keygourouten, Khadji, Bakal, Tadjalalt, and Abagazgaz, in the commune of Tessit, Ménaka Region, Mali.

== Background ==
Eastern Mali's Menaka region has been a hub of activity between the Islamic State in the Greater Sahara (ISGS), the al-Qaeda affiliate Jama'at Nusrat al-Islam wal-Muslimin (JNIM), and the pro-government Tuareg militia Movement for the Salvation of Azawad (MSA) for years. In early 2022, ISGS was preparing for an offensive to seize the entirety of Menaka region, which would commence in March 2022.

== Massacres ==
Prior to the massacre, militants from JNIM accused local residents of supplying ISGS fighters, and ordered shopkeepers to shut down shop. The militants ransacked shops and hospitals, and stole an ambulance. JNIM ordered residents to leave their villages, which around 150 to 200 households obeyed, fleeing to Niger and elsewhere in Mali. Many fled to Tessit and Gao, which are under government control.

ISGS militants entered the area after JNIM and accused civilians in the towns of Keygourouten, Khadji, Bakal, Tadjalalt, and Abagazgaz of sympathizing with JNIM, which the Islamic State considers to be heretical. The fighters massacred all men, old and young. Thirty men were executed in Tadjalalt alone. A local MSA official and a local Malian official, citing refugees, said that around 40 civilians were killed in the towns. After the massacre, Malians and Nigeriens organized a social media campaign called #JeSuisTessit to sympathize with the victims.

Around 1,200 people were displaced in Mali from the area after the ISGS massacres. The Malian government did not comment on the massacres.

== Aftermath ==
ISGS continued to massacre civilians during their campaign in Menaka region. Between March 21 and 23, around 100 civilians were killed in villages near Talataye, and 229 civilians were killed between Inchinanane and Intakore on March 21 and 23.
