= Banikane =

Barikane may refer to several places in Mali:

- Banikane, Gourma-Rharous, village and commune
- Banikane Narhawa, commune
