= Salam, Mali =

Salam
- Commune
- Location in Mali
- Coordinates: 17°3′15″N 2°59′50″W
- Country: Mali
- Region: Tombouctou Region
- Cercle: Timbuktu Cercle

Population (2009 census)
  - Total: 17,139
- Time zone: UTC+0 (GMT)

Salam is a rural commune of the Cercle of Timbuktu in the Tombouctou Region of Mali. The commune contains 26 villages and in the 2009 census had a population of 17,139. The commune is administered from Agouni. The commune includes the oasis village of Araouane.
