= February 2013 Kidal attack =

- Part of Mali War
- Location: Aliou District, Kidal, Mali
- Date: February 26, 2013; 7:30 p.m.
- Target: MNLA MIA (claimed by MIA)
- Deaths: 8: 7 MNLA fighters killed; 1 suicide bomber killed
- Injuries: 11
- Perpetrator: MOJWA

On February 26, 2013, militants from MOJWA conducted a suicide bombing on fighters from the National Movement for the Liberation of Azawad (MNLA) and Islamic Movement of Azawad (MIA) in Kidal, Mali.

== Background ==
Separatist Tuareg fighters rebelled against the Malian government in 2012, quickly capturing major cities such as Kidal and Ménaka in the north and east of the country. The rebels sought autonomy and independence from the Malian government, and many fought for the National Movement for the Liberation of Azawad. Jihadist groups such as Ansar Dine and the Movement for Oneness and Jihad in West Africa (MOJWA), seeking an independent Azawad under Shari'a law, hijacked the rebellion and began attacking the more moderate MNLA and other separatist groups, along with launching suicide bombings against civilians.

== Attack ==
At the time of the attack, the city of Kidal was under the control of the MNLA and the allied Islamic Movement of Azawad (MIA). French and Chadian forces controlled the Kidal Airport near the city. Around 7:30 p.m. on February 26, a Toyota Land Cruiser filled with explosives drove towards a checkpoint guarded by the MNLA in the Aliou district of southern Kidal. The truck detonated about ten meters from the checkpoint, as the guards were preparing to check the driver and his vehicle for explosives.

A Malian military source in Gao stated that the MNLA guarded the checkpoint at the time of the attack, which was corroborated by an MNLA press release mourning the deaths of their fighters. Alghabass Ag Intalla, the head of the MIA, claimed that the bombing took place at a checkpoint guarded by his fighters.

== Aftermath ==
MOJWA claimed responsibility for the attack, but gave no further details. Intalla claimed the deaths of four to six MIA fighters. Local hospital sources reported that seven people were killed in the attack, and eleven others were injured. An MNLA press release claimed the deaths of seven MNLA fighters and injuries of several others. The bodies of the victims were buried in a mass grave the next day.
