= Tessalit Airport =

Airport in Mali

Tessalit Airport Aéroport de Tessalit
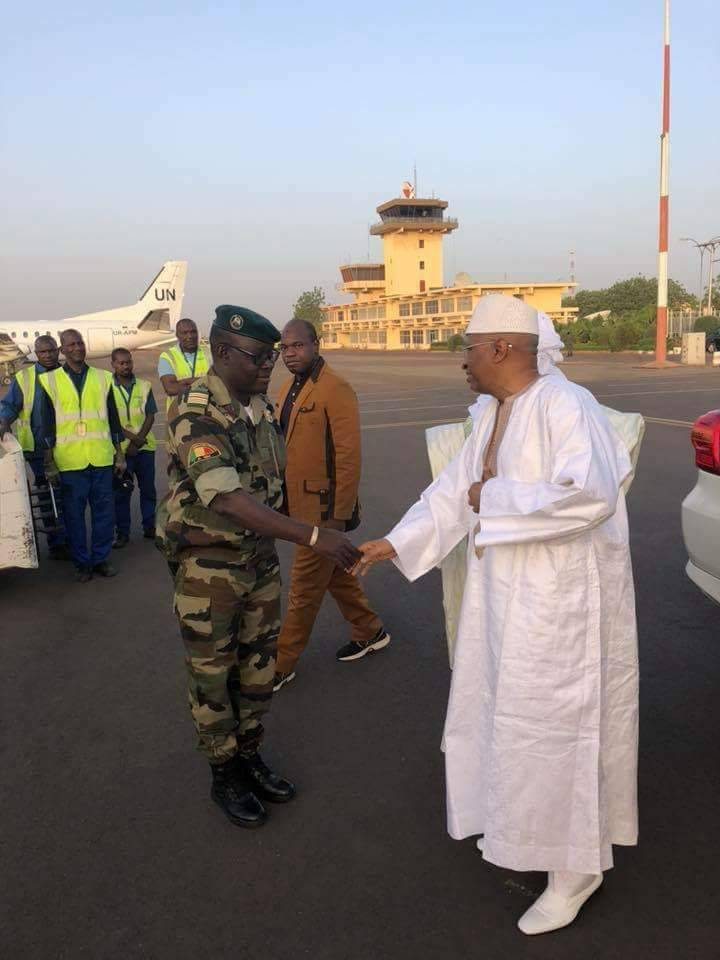
- During a visit of the Prime Minister Soumeylou Boubèye Maïga in March 2018
- IATA: none; ICAO: GATS

Summary
- Airport type: Public
- Serves: Tessalit
- Elevation AMSL: 1,612 ft (491 m)
- Coordinates: 20°14′45″N 0°58′50″E

Map
- Location of the airport in Mali

Runways
Direction	Length		Surface
Direction	m	ft	Surface
05/23	2,500	8,202	Asphalt
15/33	1,200	3,937	Sand
- Source: Google Maps GCM

Tessalit Airport (ICAO: GATS) (French: Aéroport de Tessalit) is a desert airport serving Tessalit, a village in the Kidal Region of Mali. The airport is at the village of Amachach, 7 kilometres (4.3 mi) northwest of Tessalit. A third, unpaved 1,500 metres (4,921 ft) runway runs parallel to the primary runway. The Tessalit non-directional beacon (Ident: TZE) is located on the airport.

== See also ==
- Transport in Mali
- List of airports in Mali
