= Yélimané Airport =

Airport in Mali

Yélimané Airport Aéroport de Yélimané
- IATA: EYL; ICAO: GAYE

Summary
- Airport type: Public
- Serves: Yélimané, Mali
- Elevation AMSL: 331 ft (101 m)
- Coordinates: 15°07′25″N 10°34′05″W

Map
- Location of the airport in Mali

Runways
Direction	Length		Surface
Direction	m	ft	Surface
10/28	1,600	5,249	Dirt
- Source: Google Maps SkyVector

Yélimané Airport (IATA: EYL, ICAO: GAYE) (French: Aéroport de Yélimané) is an airport serving Yélimané, a desert town in the Kayes Region of Mali.

The Yelimane non-directional beacon (Ident: YE) is located on the field.

== See also ==
- Transport in Mali
- List of airports in Mali
