= Djebok ambush =

- Part of Mali War
Date	July 10, 2017
Location	Djebok, Mali
Result	Franco-Malian victory

Belligerents
Mali; France	Jama'at Nasr al-Islam wal Muslimin

Casualties and losses
None	10–12 killed 1 POW; 2 pick-ups destroyed

On July 10, 2017, French and Malian forces ambushed jihadists from Jama'at Nasr al-Islam wal Muslimin near Djebok, Mali.

== Prelude ==
Jama'at Nasr al-Islam wal Muslimin formed in early 2017 as a coalition of five jihadist groups that rebelled against the Malian government in 2012. During the French intervention in Mali, Franco-Malian forces conducted searches across the country routinely to spot jihadists.

== Ambush ==
A vehicle carrying armed men was spotted by two French helicopters during a reconnaissance mission near Djebok on July 10. The jihadists opened fire on the aircraft, so the French forces shot back. Four groups of Malian commandos were deployed to the area, with the French and Malian armies countering the jihadists.

== Aftermath ==
The French army stated that two heavily armed pick-ups were destroyed in the fighting, and that several jihadists were neutralized. In a follow-up press release, the Malian army stated on July 13 that a dozen jihadists were killed in the ambush in Djebok, along with one jihadist killed in a separate incident in Talataye.
