= Doukouria =

- Commune and village
- Location in Mali
- Coordinates: 16°31′35″N 3°33′12″W
- Country: Mali
- Region: Tombouctou Region
- Cercle: Goundam Cercle

Area
  - Total: 1,111 km^{2} (429 sq mi)

Population (2009 census)
  - Total: 3,001
  - Density: 2.701/km^{2} (6.996/sq mi)
- Time zone: UTC+0 (GMT)

Doukouria is a village and rural commune of the Cercle of Goudam in the Tombouctou Region of Mali.
