= Bafoulabé Airport =

Airport in Mali

Bafoulabé Airport Aéroport de Bafoulabé
- IATA: none; ICAO: GABF

Summary
- Airport type: Public
- Serves: Bafoulabé, Mali
- Elevation AMSL: 380 ft / 116 m
- Coordinates: 13°48′25″N 10°50′50″W

Map
- Location of Bafoulabé Airport in Mali

Runways
Direction	Length		Surface
Direction	m	ft	Surface
06/24	900	2,953	Dirt
- Sources:GCM

Bafoulabé Airport (ICAO: GABF) (French: Aéroport de Bafoulabé) is an airstrip serving Bafoulabé, a town and commune in the Bafoulabé Cercle of the Kayes Region of Mali. Bafoulabé is on the Senegal River at its confluence from the Bafing and Bakoy Rivers. The airport is just west of the town.

The airport elevation is 380 feet (116 m) above mean sea level. It has one runway that is 900 metres (2,953 ft) long.

== See also ==
- Transport in Mali
- List of airports in Mali
