= Battle of Niafunké =

Coordinates: 15.9292°N 3.9908°W

- Part of 2012 Tuareg rebellion
- Battle of Niafunké (Mali)
| Date | 31 January 2012 |
| Location | Niafunké, Mali |
| Result | Malian victory |

Belligerents
| Mali | (Azawad) MNLA |

Strength
| 50 regular soldiers | Few dozen fighters 4–10 vehicles |

Casualties and losses
| 4 killed 6 wounded | 5 killed |
- 2 civilians killed

On 31 January, at approx. 6:45 A.M, the Malian military cantonment in Niafunké comes under attack by elements of the MNLA. The military camp located in the town undergoes a fierce assault by rebels. A Malian soldier is reported killed. Next military reinforcements nearby are called in for assistance but are ambushed by rebels. After several hours of a standoff the MNLA relinquishes siege of the camp. Military casualties were 4 dead, and 6 wounded. The dead included a Malian army captain. Five MNLA members were killed. Two civilian students also died during the battle by stray bullets.
