= Hangabéra =

- Village
- Location in Mali
- Coordinates: 16°35′23″N 3°43′32″W
- Country: Mali
- Region: Tombouctou Region
- Cercle: Goundam Cercle
- Commune: Tele
- Time zone: UTC+0 (GMT)

Hangabéra is a village and seat of the commune of Tele in the Cercle of Goundam in the Tombouctou Region of Mali.
