= N'Tillit clashes =

2014 armed conflict in Mali

- Part of Mali War
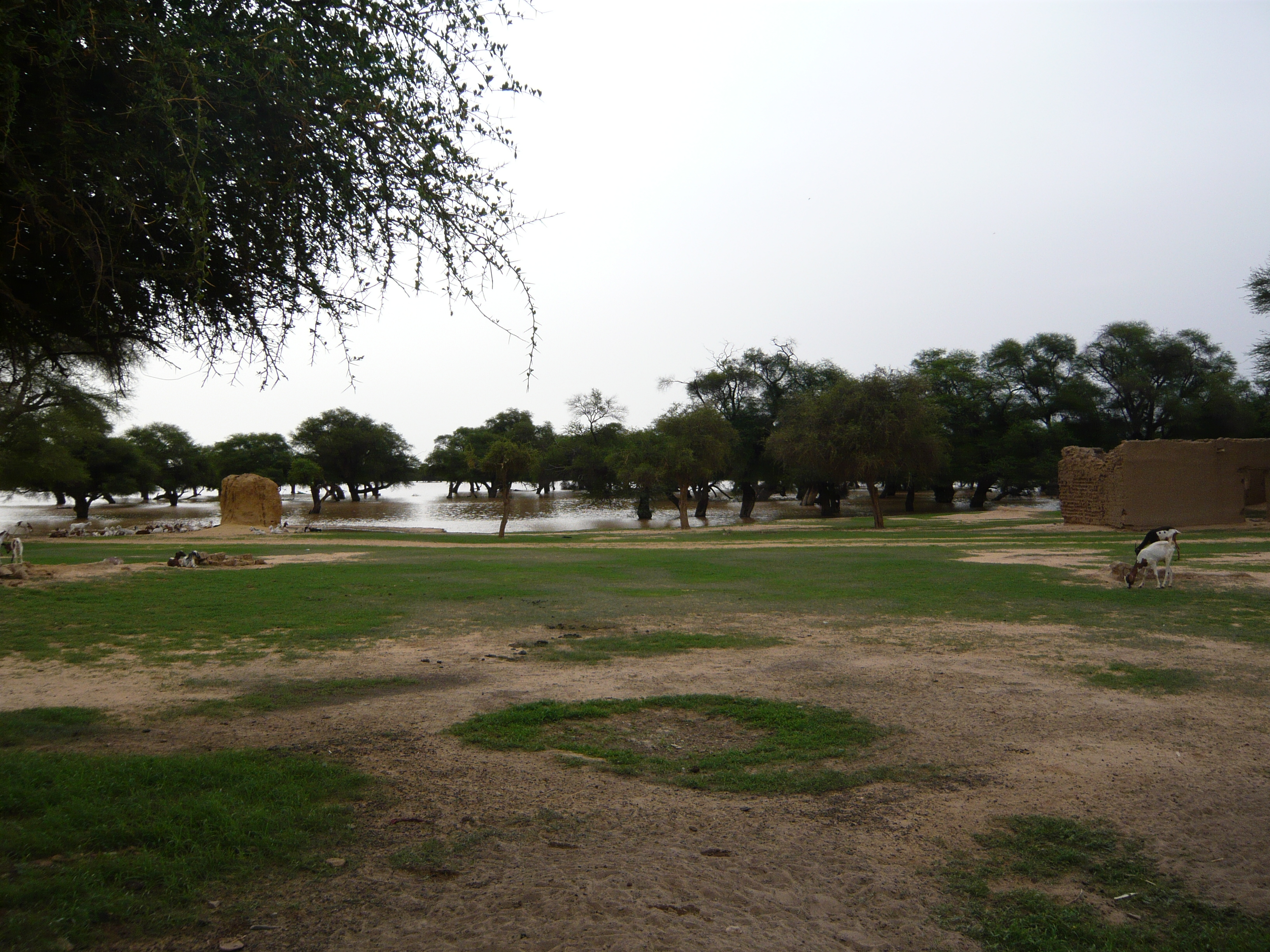
- N'Tillit circa 2008
Date	October 16, 2014
Location	N'Tillit, Gao Region, Mali
Result	Platform victory

Belligerents
GATIA; MAA-Loyalist	MNLA

Casualties and losses
3 killed (per MINUSMA); 14 killed 9 injured (per MNLA)	4 killed (per MINUSMA); 2 killed 3 injured (per MNLA)

On October 16, 2014, clashes broke out between the pro-government GATIA militia and the National Movement for the Liberation of Azawad in N'Tillit, Mali.

== Background ==
The National Movement for the Liberation of Azawad (MNLA) consists of Ifoghas Tuaregs, and rebelled against the Malian government in 2012. Imghad Tuaregs, who are considered by Ifoghas to be a vassal clan of Tuaregs, created the GATIA militia that supported the Malian state. By 2014, peace negotiations were ongoing between the Malian government and Platform, a coalition of pro-government rebels including GATIA and loyalist factions of the Arab Movement of Azawad (MAA), and the Coordination of Azawad Movements, which included the MNLA.

== Battle ==
GATIA fighters attacked an MNLA outpost in N'Tillit on October 16, claiming retaliation for the forced disarmament of a GATIA fighter in his home by MNLA fighters. The group denounced the disarmament as unacceptable. The MNLA denounced the attack in a press release, and accused the Malian Army of supporting GATIA in the attack. The Malian Army denounced these claims, stating that GATIA was autonomous.

MINUSMA confirmed the presence of loyalist MAA fighters before the battle, and stated that the presence of the MAA was due to residents backing up the presence of the MNLA. GATIA fighters arrived on nineteen to twenty pickups, with fighting lasting for more than six hours. The MNLA claimed to have fought until 5:30pm before being forced to retreat. Shortly afterward, GATIA seized the village, and claimed to also capture the nearby town of Tessit.

A detachment of Nigerien peacekeepers from MINUSMA arrived in the village on the evening of October 16. A Dutch drone and a helicopter flew over the village for the rest of the evening.

== Aftermath ==
A MINUSMA source told AFP that at least four MNLA fighters were killed and three GATIA fighters were killed. Six were wounded in total on both sides. The MNLA stated two fighters were killed and three were injured, in conjunction to fourteen GATIA fighters killed and nine injured. The Malian government released a statement condemning the violence and expressing condolences to the victims, while also reaffirming they didn't intervene.
