= Inabelbel clashes =

2018 battle of the Mali War

- Part of Mali War
Date	June 22, 2018
Location	Inabelbel forest, Tombouctou Region, Mali
Result	Franco-Malian victory

Belligerents
Mali; France	Jama'at Nasr al-Islam wal Muslimin

Strength
Unknown	~20

Casualties and losses
None	15 killed or captured

Clashes at Inabelbel took place on June 22, 2018, between French and Malian forces against Jama'at Nasr al-Islam wal Muslimin.

== Prelude ==
Jama'at Nasr al-Islam wal Muslimin is a coalition of five jihadist groups that initially rebelled against the Malian government in 2012, before amalgamating in 2017 to form JNIM. Throughout 2018, the group spread in southern Tombouctou Region and northern Mopti Region. At the time of the attack in Inabelbel, French and Malian troops were carrying out an operation called "Bani Fonda" in the gourma region of Mali.

== Clashes ==
French and Malian forces were ambushed by JNIM fighters on June 22 while on patrol in the forest near Inabelbel. The jihadists then attacked a group of Malian commandos in the forest. In response, French forces from Operation Barkhane deployed air support and reinforcement. Afterwards, the French general staff reported 15 jihadists were neutralized. Two pick-ups, six motorcycles, and some weaponry was seized.
