= Lafia, Mali =

Lafia
- Commune
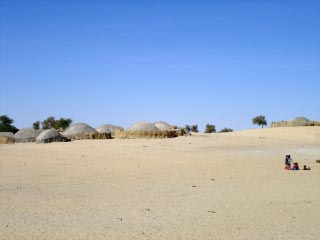
- Sahara Desert Tribal Camp.jpg

- Location in Mali
- Coordinates: 16°37′01″N 2°40′59″W
- Country: Mali
- Region: Tombouctou Region
- Cercle: Timbuktu Cercle
- Admin HQ (Chef-lieu): Aglal

Area
  - Total: 446 km^{2} (172 sq mi)

Population (2009 census)
  - Total: 7,764
  - Density: 17.4/km^{2} (45.1/sq mi)
- Time zone: UTC+0 (GMT)

Lafia is a commune of the Cercle of Timbuktu in the Tombouctou Region of Mali. The administrative center (chef-lieu) is the village of Aglal.
