= Tilemsi =

Tilemsi may refer to two communes in Mali:

- Tilemsi, Gao
- Tilemsi, Tombouctou
