= Douékiré =

- Commune and village
- Location in Mali
- Coordinates: 16°34′25″N 3°22′19″W
- Country: Mali
- Region: Tombouctou Region
- Cercle: Goundam Cercle

Area
  - Total: 1,422 km^{2} (549 sq mi)

Population (2009 census)
  - Total: 17,401
  - Density: 12.24/km^{2} (31.69/sq mi)
- Time zone: UTC+0 (GMT)

Douékiré is a village and commune of the Cercle of Goudam in the Tombouctou Region of Mali.
