= Bourem-Inaly =

- Commune and village
- Location in Mali
- Coordinates: 16°41′18″N 2°51′10″W
- Country: Mali
- Region: Tombouctou Region
- Cercle: Timbuktu Cercle

Population (Census 2009)
  - Total: 12,336
- Time zone: UTC+0 (GMT)

Bourem-Inaly is a village and commune of the Cercle of Timbuktu in the Tombouctou Region of Mali. In 1998 the commune had a population of 8,532.
