= Alafia =

- Commune

- Location of Toya in Mali
- Coordinates: 16°39′25″N 3°02′52″W
- Country: Mali
- Region: Tombouctou Region
- Cercle: Timbuktu Cercle

Area
  - Total: 27,857 km^{2} (10,756 sq mi)

Population (2009 census)
  - Total: 13,318
- Time zone: UTC+0 (GMT)

Alafia is a rural commune of the Cercle of Timbuktu in the Tombouctou Region of Mali. The main village and administrative centre is Toya. The commune is mostly desert and covers an area of 27,857 km^{2}. In the 2009 census the commune had a population of 13,318.
