= Bougouni Airport =

Airport in Mali

Bougouni Airport Aéroport Bougouni
- IATA: none; ICAO: GABG

Summary
- Airport type: Public
- Serves: Bougouni, Mali
- Elevation AMSL: 1,139 ft / 347 m
- Coordinates: 11°26′25″N 7°30′30″W

Map
- Location of the airport in Mali

Runways
Direction	Length		Surface
Direction	m	ft	Surface
03/21	800	2,625	Dirt
- Source: Google Maps GCM

Bougouni Airport (ICAO: GABG) (French: Aéroport Bougouni) is an airstrip serving Bougouni in Mali.

== See also ==
- Transport in Mali
- List of airports in Mali
