= Niafunké Airport =

Airport in Mali

Niafunké Airport Aéroport de Niafunké
- IATA: none; ICAO: GANF

Summary
- Airport type: Public
- Serves: Niafunké, Mali
- Elevation AMSL: 866 ft / 264 m
- Coordinates: 15°55′25″N 004°00′25″W

Map
- Location of Niafunké Airport in Mali

Runways
Direction	Length		Surface
Direction	ft	m	Surface
08/26	3,937	1,200	Gravel

Niafunké Airport (ICAO: GANF) (French: Aéroport de Niafunké) is an airport serving Niafunké, a town in the Niafunké Cercle in the Tombouctou Region of Mali. It is 866 feet (264 m) above mean sea level. It has one runway that is 1,200 metres (3,937 ft) long.
