= Al-Hassan Ag Abdoul Aziz =

Malian Islamist militant (b. 1977)

Al-Hassan Ag Abdoul Aziz Ag Mohamed Ag Mahmoud
- Born: 19 September 1977 (age 49); Hangabéra, Mali
- Convictions: Crimes against humanity; War crimes
- Trial: ICC investigation in Mali
- Penalty: 10 years in prison
- Military career
- Allegiance: Ansar Dine
- Commands: Islamic Police in Timbuktu
- Conflict: Northern Mali conflict

Al-Hassan Ag Abdoul Aziz Ag Mohamed Ag Mahmoud (born 19 September 1977) is a Malian Islamist militant and convicted war criminal who joined Ansar Dine in early 2012 and became an interpreter and administrator of the Islamic police in Timbuktu during the Northern Mali conflict. Al-Hassan was tried in the International Criminal Court on the charges of crimes against humanity and war crimes carried out during 2012 and 2013, including rape and sexual slavery under Article 8 2.(e)(vi) of the Rome Statute of the ICC. He was convicted on 26 June 2024 of some of the war crimes and crimes against humanity charges, including torture, mutilation and cruel treatment. He was acquitted of the charges of rape, sexual slavery and other inhumane acts in the form of forced marriage.

== Northern Mali conflict ==
Ansar Dine and al-Qaeda in the Islamic Maghreb (AQMI) held military control over Timbuktu during April 2012 to January 2013. Ansar Dine and AQMI created what they called a religious police force, a morals brigade and an Islamic tribunal, which severely punished locals disobeying the Ansar Dine/AQMI rules, with imprisonment, unfair trials, flogging, torture and the destruction of religious objects. Al-Hassan joined Ansar Dine in early 2012 and by May 2012 had become a member of the religious police. Al-Hassan also cooperated with the Islamic tribunal, knowing, according to the Prosecution at the ICC, that the tribunal operated unfairly, and participated in carrying out the tribunal's punishments and in the destruction of Muslim mausoleums in Timbuktu. Al-Hassan participated in a program of forced marriages that effectively rendered Timbuktu women and girls as sexual slaves.

== ICC case ==
The Prosecutor of the ICC, in light of her investigation in Mali, argued that al-Hassan's actions during 2012 and 2013 constituted part of the systematic policy of an organisation against the civilian population of Timbuktu, and that he individually, together with others, via others, and by giving orders or encouragements, was penally responsible for crimes against humanity and war crimes.

=== Mandate and arrest ===
The ICC issued a mandate for al-Hassan's arrest on 27 March 2018. He was surrendered by Mali to the court several days later, arriving in the Netherlands on 31 March 2018.

The case against al-Hassan was described as "groundbreaking" in The Guardian as it included sexual enslavement as a major component of the war crimes and crimes against humanity charges. Melinda Reed of Women's Initiatives for Gender Justice described the case as "another step in a positive evolution. Every decision matters. We are writing the jurisprudence of the future now, so every case and every step is extremely important with regards to gender-based and sexual crimes."

=== Trial ===
On 30 September 2019, ICC judges confirmed the charges against al-Hassan and stated that the trial would proceed. Al-Hassan's lawyers stated that he was innocent and that the case should be dismissed.

Closing statements were given by both the prosecution and defense on 25 May 2023.

=== Evidence allegedly obtained through torture ===
The defence claimed that trial evidence against Al-Hassan was tainted by his torture in Mali during the time that ICC investigators interviewed him. ICC personnel commented during his interviews that Al-Hassan's conditions were "like Guantanamo," and Al-Hassan informed prosecutors that beatings and abuse were taking place in his prison. The Trial Chamber denied Al-Hassan's attempt to have the evidence excluded. According to Georgetown Law professor David Luban, the Trial Chamber "rejected the defense's request for voir dire on the issues of fact (17–18), dismissed the reports of the defense's medical experts (48), and granted the Prosecutor's motion to exclude a defense submission containing a table pairing the Prosecutor's assertions with 'extracts of evidence which, in the Defence's submission, purportedly refute those assertions' (22)." Luban concluded: "The Trial Chamber's decision, in brief: we don't want to hear about torture or the shadow it casts on evidence. Let the tainted evidence in."

=== Conviction on some charges ===
On 26 June 2024, the International Criminal Court found al-Hassan guilty of some of the charges presented. He was found guilty of the crime against humanity of torture, the war crimes of torture and outrages upon personal dignity, and the war crimes of mutilation, cruel treatment and passing sentences without a fair trial; and the crimes against humanity of persecution and other inhumane acts.

Al-Hassan was found not guilty of the war crimes and crimes against humanity of rape and sexual slavery. The ICC Trial Chamber found that the events had occurred, but that al-Hassan was not responsible for them. Al-Hassan was also found not guilty of the war crime of attacking protected objects. On 20 November 2024 he was sentenced to ten years' imprisonment.
