= Adarmalane =

- Commune
- Location in Mali
- Coordinates: 16°37′14″N 4°19′16″W
- Country: Mali
- Region: Tombouctou Region
- Cercle: Goundam Cercle

Area
  - Total: 250 km^{2} (97 sq mi)

Population (2009 census)
  - Total: 1,790
  - Density: 7.2/km^{2} (19/sq mi)
- Time zone: UTC+0 (GMT)

Adarmalane also D'adarmalane is a rural commune of the Cercle of Goudam in the Tombouctou Region of Mali. It lies to the south of Lake Faguibine.
