= N'Gorkou =

- Commune and village
- Location in Mali
- Coordinates: 15°39′33″N 3°42′56″W
- Country: Mali
- Region: Tombouctou Region
- Cercle: Niafunké Cercle

Area
  - Total: 879 km^{2} (339 sq mi)

Population (2009 census)
  - Total: 24,381
  - Density: 27.7/km^{2} (71.8/sq mi)
- Time zone: UTC+0 (GMT)

N'Gorkou is a village and rural commune of the Cercle of Niafunké in the Tombouctou Region of Mali. The commune includes around 54 small settlements.
