= 2025 Tessit attack =

- Part of Mali War
Date	June 4, 2025
Location	Tessit, Mali
Result	ISGS victory

Belligerents
FAMa	Islamic State - Sahel Province

Casualties and losses
40+ killed	Unknown

On June 4, 2025, jihadists from the Islamic State – Sahel Province (ISGS) attacked the Malian military base at Tessit, killing at least 40 soldiers and 50 civilians.

== Background ==
Beginning in spring of 2025, the al-Qaeda affiliate Jama'at Nasr al-Islam wal-Muslimin launched an offensive against Malian military sites in the south and center of the country. Attacks on Dioura, Boulikessi, and Timbuktu killed over a hundred Malian soldiers in total. In the southeast, however, where the ISGS is based, there were few attacks by the group against Malian forces; on May 25, ISGS killed over 50 Nigerian soldiers across the border in Tahoua Region.

== Attack ==
The base was attacked on the afternoon of June 4, with ISGS militants storming the base and sparking clashes with Malian and allied GATIA fighters. The base was heavily damaged in the assault, and the attackers left with looted weapons and vehicles. Malian officials confirmed the attack's existence, but only stated that "air patrols had violently struck the terrorist column" in their attempt to withdraw.

RFI reported that around 40 Malian soldiers were killed in the attack, according to local sources. Sahel expert Wassim Nasr stated that there were likely over 40 killed.
