= Kaneye =

Coordinates: 16°25′N 3°36′W

- Commune and village
- Interactive map of Kaneye
- Country: Mali
- Region: Tombouctou Region
- Cercle: Goundam Cercle

Population (1998)
  - Total: 2,418
- Time zone: UTC+0 (GMT)

Kaneye is a village and commune of the Cercle of Goudam in the Tombouctou Region of Mali. As of 1998 the commune had a population of 2,418.
