= Tin Aicha =

Coordinates: 16°58′N 4°33′W

- Commune and village
- Interactive map of Tin Aicha
- Country: Mali
- Region: Tombouctou Region
- Cercle: Goundam Cercle

Population (1998)
  - Total: 3,940
- Time zone: UTC+0 (GMT)

Tin Aicha is a village and commune of the Cercle of Goudam in the Tombouctou Region of Mali. As of 1998 the commune had a population of 3,940.
