= August 2021 Darey-Daye massacre =

Mass murder in Niger

- Part of Jihadist insurgency in Niger
- Location: Darey-Daye, Tillaberi Region, Niger
- Date: August 16, 2021
- Deaths: 37
- Perpetrator: Unknown

On August 16, 2021, Militants attacked the town of Darey-Daye, Tillabéri Region, Niger, killing at least 37 people. The massacre was the second major attack on Darey-Daye in 2021, after a massacre by the ISGS in March killed 66 people.

== Background ==
At the start of 2021, the Islamic State in the Greater Sahara, a predominantly Fulani organization based in the tri-border area between Mali, Niger, and Burkina Faso, began attacking civilian areas, especially with non-Fulani populations. The first major attack was the Tchoma Bangou and Zaroumdareye massacres that killed 105 people, and on the same day of the attack in Darey-Daye, ISGS fighters in Mali killed thirty-three Malian soldiers during the battle of Tessit.

In March 2021, Militants attacked buses carrying civilians between Chinagodrar and Darey-Daye, killing sixty-six people and targeting Zarma men and boys. The attack on Darey-Daye was followed by an attack on four villages in Tillia a week later that killed 137 people.

== Massacre ==
At the time of the massacre, civilians in Darey-Daye were tending to their fields when jihadists arrived on motorbikes. The attack occurred shortly after Friday prayer, and the perpetrators shot indiscriminately at the farmers, killing fourteen children. The Nigerien Ministry of Defense stated on August 17 that 37 people were killed in the massacre. Nigerien officials also mandated 48 hours of mourning and flags to be placed at half-mast.

ISGS did not immediately claim responsibility for the massacre, although were suspected by Nigerien officials and analysts.
