= M'Bouna =

Coordinates: 16°41′N 3°58′W

- Commune and village
- Interactive map of M'Bouna
- Country: Mali
- Region: Tombouctou Region
- Cercle: Goundam Cercle

Population (1998)
  - Total: 6,070
- Time zone: UTC+0 (GMT)

M'Bouna is a village and commune of the Cercle of Goudam in the Tombouctou Region of Mali. As of 1998, the commune had a population of 6,070.
