= Bintagoungou =

- Commune and village
- Location in Mali
- Coordinates: 16.738°N 3.732°W
- Country: Mali
- Region: Tombouctou Region
- Cercle: Goundam Cercle

Area
  - Total: 92 km^{2} (36 sq mi)

Population (2009 census)
  - Total: 4,004
  - Density: 44/km^{2} (110/sq mi)
- Time zone: UTC+0 (GMT)

Bintagoungou is a rural commune and village of the Cercle of Goudam in the Tombouctou Region of Mali. The village lies at the south east corner of Lake Faguibine near the channel that connects Lake Faguibine to Lake Takara. The commune includes all of Lake Takara and a small section at the eastern end of Lake Faguibine.

The commune includes eight settlements:

- Alphahou Abarbouch
- Alphahou Inataben
- Alphahou Taraba
- Bintagoungou
- Etewel
- Taxina
- Tihigrène
- Toufazrouf
