= Banikane Narhawa =

- Commune and village
- Location in Mali
- Coordinates: 16°56′56″N 1°45′02″W
- Country: Mali
- Region: Tombouctou Region
- Cercle: Niafunké Cercle

Area
  - Total: 553 km^{2} (214 sq mi)

Population (2009 census)
  - Total: 24,193
  - Density: 43.7/km^{2} (113/sq mi)
- Time zone: UTC+0 (GMT)

Banikane Narhawa is a village and commune of the Cercle of Niafunké in the Tombouctou Region of Mali.
