= Dianke =

- Commune and village
- Location in Mali
- Coordinates: 15°44′N 4°39′W
- Country: Mali
- Region: Tombouctou Region
- Cercle: Niafunké Cercle

Population (2009 Census)
  - Total: 12,684
- Time zone: UTC+0 (GMT)

Dianke is a village and commune of the Cercle of Niafunké in the Tombouctou Region of Mali. In the 2009 census the commune had a population of 12,684.
