= International Criminal Court investigation in Mali =

Situation in the Republic of Mali
- The seal of the International Criminal Court
- File no.: 01/12
- Referred by: Mali
- Date referred: 13 July 2012
- Date opened: 16 January 2013
- Incident(s): Mali War
- Crimes: War crimes: · Intentionally directing attacks against buildings dedicated to religion · Destruction of cultural world heritage in the Malian city of Timbuktu

Status of suspects
- Ahmad al-Faqi al-Mahdi: Served a 7 year sentence
- al-Hassan Ag Abdoul Aziz: Convicted
- Iyad Ag Ghaly: Fugitive

The International Criminal Court investigation in Mali or the Situation in the Republic of Mali is an ongoing investigation by the International Criminal Court (ICC) into war crimes and other crimes within the ICC's jurisdiction that are alleged to have occurred during the Mali War since January 2012. The investigation was requested by the government of Mali in July 2012. As the first person who pleaded guilty to a charge of the ICC, Ahmad al-Faqi al-Mahdi made a statement expressing remorse and advising others not to commit similar acts.

On 27 September 2016, al-Mahdi was sentenced to nine years in prison for the destruction of cultural world heritage in the Malian city of Timbuktu. At least nine mausoleums and one mosque were destroyed. On 26 June 2024, al-Hassan Ag Abdoul Aziz was found guilty of crimes against humanity and war crimes.

== Background ==
Several human rights organisations reported on human rights abuses during the Northern Mali conflict that started in early 2012. The International Federation for Human Rights (FIDH) and its Malian member organisation Association Malienne des Droits de l'Homme (AMDH) published a detailed report in December 2012, referring to evidence of a rape campaign in Gao and Timbuktu after their takeover by the National Movement for the Liberation of Azawad (MNLA), recruitment of 12- to 15-year-old children as child soldiers by Ansar Dine, and the summary execution of up to 153 Malian soldiers by the MNLA and Ansar Dine on 24 January 2012. Human Rights Watch reported the use of "several hundred" child soldiers by the Movement for Unity and Jihad in West Africa (MUJAO), and Al Qaeda in the Islamic Maghreb (AQIM). Amnesty International published a detailed report in May 2012, describing the human rights situation as "Mali's worst human rights situation in 50 years".

== Referral ==
On 13 July 2012, the government of Mali, represented by its Minister of Justice Malick Coulibaly, made a formal request to the ICC to investigate war crimes and crimes against humanity that took place in Mali since January 2012.

== Investigation ==
The ICC's Office of the Prosecutor gathered evidence, and on 16 January 2013, the Court formally started a full investigation led by Chief Prosecutor Fatou Bensouda. Bensouda has determined that there is a reasonable basis to believe the following crimes were committed during the conflict: (i) murder; (ii) mutilation, cruel treatment and torture; (iii) intentionally directing attacks against protected objects; (iv) the passing of sentences and the carrying out of executions without previous judgement pronounced by a regularly constituted court; (v) pillaging, and (vi) rape. The 16 January 2013 ICC report listed evidence for suspected crimes that include some attributed to the MNLA, such as the executions at Aguelhok of about 100 Malian army soldiers on 24 January 2012, and some attributed to the Malian army, such as the Diabaly September 2012 massacre of 16 unarmed preachers.

=== Cases ===
==== Ahmad al-Faqi al-Mahdi ====
On 18 September 2015, the court issued an arrest warrant for Ahmad al-Faqi al-Mahdi, who was accused of the war crime of intentionally directing attacks against buildings dedicated to religion, specifically the mausoleums and mosques located in Timbuktu. They were destroyed by members of Ansar Dine and other Islamist groups in 2012.

On 26 September 2015, he was sent from Niger to the court's detention center in The Hague. On 27 September 2016, al-Mahdi was sentenced to nine years in prison for the destruction of cultural world heritage in the Malian city of Timbuktu.

==== Al Hassan ====
Al Hassan Ag Abdoul Aziz Ag Mohamed Ag Mahmoud, born on 19 September 1977, was allegedly a member of Ansar Dine and the de facto chief of the Islamic Police. He has also been allegedly involved in the work of the Islamic court in Timbuktu and in executing its decisions.

Al Hassan was charged for crimes against humanity allegedly committed in Timbuktu, Mali, for allegedly participating in a widespread and systematic attack by armed groups against the civilian population of Timbuktu and its region, between 1 April 2012 and 28 January 2013. He is also being charged for war crimes allegedly committed in Timbuktu, Mali, between April 2012 and January 2013.

On 26 June 2024, al-Hassan was found guilty.

==== Iyad Ag Ghaly ====
On 18 July 2017, the court issued an arrest warrant under seal for Iyad Ag Ghaly, accused of committing war crimes and crimes against humanity in Timbuktu between 2012 and 2013 as the leader of Ansar Dine. The warrant was made public on 21 June 2024.
