= Sikasso Airport =

Airport in Mali

Sikasso Airport Aéroport de Sikasso
- IATA: KSS; ICAO: GASK

Summary
- Airport type: Public
- Serves: Sikasso
- Elevation AMSL: 1,302 ft / 397 m
- Coordinates: 11°19′35″N 5°41′30″W

Map
- Location of the airport in Mali

Runways
Direction	Length		Surface
Direction	ft	m	Surface
08/26	1,840	561	Paved
- Source: Google Maps

Sikasso Airport (IATA: KSS, ICAO: GASK) (French: Aéroport de Sikasso) is an airport serving Sikasso in Mali. Aerial images of runway markings show an original unpaved length of approximately 2,000 metres (6,562 ft), much of which has deteriorated or found other uses. A 225 metres (738 ft) dirt overrun on the west end of the gravel pavement appears usable.

== See also ==
- Transport in Mali
