= Tilemsi, Tombouctou =

Tilemsi
- Commune
- Location in Mali
- Coordinates: 16°20′00″N 4°57′45″W
- Country: Mali
- Region: Tombouctou Region
- Cercle: Goundam Cercle

Population (2009 census)
  - Total: 7,296
- Time zone: UTC+0 (GMT)

Tilemsi is a commune of the Cercle of Goundam in the Tombouctou Region of Mali. The seat lies at Kel Malha. In the 2009 census the commune had a population of 7,296.
