= Bengassi Airport =

Airport in Mail

Bengassi Airport Aéroport de Bangassi
- IATA: none; ICAO: none

Summary
- Airport type: Public
- Serves: Manantali
- Elevation AMSL: 538 ft / 164 m
- Coordinates: 13°15′20″N 10°30′15″W

Map
- Location of the airport in Mali

Runways
Direction	Length		Surface
Direction	ft	m	Surface
09/27	4,660	1,420	Gravel
- Source: Google Maps

Bengassi Airport (French: Aéroport de Bangassi) is an airport serving Manantali in Mali. The airport is located 8 kilometres (5 mi) northwest of the town.

== See also ==
- Transport in Mali
