= Goundam Airport =

Airport in Mali

Goundam Aéroport de Goundam
- IATA: GUD; ICAO: GAGM

Summary
- Airport type: Public
- Serves: Goundam
- Elevation AMSL: 866 ft (264 m)
- Coordinates: 16°21′30″N 3°36′15″W

Map
- Location of the airport in Mali

Runways
Direction	Length		Surface
Direction	m	ft	Surface
05/23	1,500	4,921	Dirt
- Source: Google Maps GCM

Goundam Airport (IATA: GUD, ICAO: GAGM) (French: Aéroport de Goundam) is an airstrip serving Goundam in Mali. It is 8 kilometres (5 mi) southeast of the town.

== See also ==
- Transport in Mali
- List of airports in Mali
