= Ansongo =

- Commune and town
- Location in Mali
- Coordinates: 15°39′34″N 0°30′6″E
- Country: Mali
- Region: Gao Region
- Cercle: Ansongo Cercle

Area
  - Total: 445 km^{2} (172 sq mi)
- Elevation: 246 m (807 ft)

Population (2009 Census)
  - Total: 32,709
  - Density: 73.5/km^{2} (190/sq mi)
- Time zone: UTC+1 (WAT)

Ansongo is a rural commune and small town in the Gao Region of eastern Mali. The town lies on the left bank of the Niger River 90 km south of Gao. It is the administrative center for the surrounding Ansongo Cercle. The commune covers an area of 445 square kilometers and in the 2009 census had a population of 32,709.

== Geography and climate ==
Ansongo is located in the southern part of the Gao region. The rural commune of Ansongo was created on 4 November 1996. It covers an area of approximately 445 km^{2} and is mostly located on the left bank of the Niger River but includes a small area on the right bank. As well as Ansongo, the commune includes the villages of Bazi-Gourma, Bazi-Haoussa, Monzonga, Seyna-Bella and Seyna-Sonrhai. The commune is bordered to the east by the town of Tin-Hama, to the south by the commune of Bourre, to the west by the commune of Tessit and to the north and north east by the communes of Bara and Talataye. The town of Ansongo has 23 councilors representing numerous parties. Directly to the east of the town is the Ansongo-Ménaka animal reserve, which covers an area of more than 4,300,000 acres (1,750,000 hectares).

The climate is sahelian, and is characterized by the alternation of two seasons: a long dry season (October to June) and a short wet season (July to September). The annual rainfall varies between 250 and 350 mm depending on the year. Ansongo may experience major fluctuations in temperature, such as from 15 °C to 45 °C. The commune is overall on a low altitude and the Niger River plays a crucial role in the nature of the commune.

There are two major types of soil in Ansongo, sandy clay soil along the river suitable for growing rice, vegetables and sorghum and the rearing of some livestock and sandy soils that occur in areas away from the river valley, notably the formations of sand dunes between which there are clay depressions. The presence of sand however is sometimes covered by vegetation. Vegetation consists of wooded savanna with dominant species such as acacias, Ziziphus mauritiana and Euphorbia balsamifera.

== History ==
In October 2022, large swaths of rural areas were conquered by the Islamic State in the Greater Sahara in the Ansongo Cercle, causing the local civil society committee of Ansongo and its surroundings to launch 48 hours of civil disobedience.

In November 2023 MINUSMA officially closed its base in Ansongo.

== Economy ==
Niger River at Ansongo

Average monthly flow (m^{3}/s) at the Ansongo hydrometric station over the period 1951–1992

Ansongo is primarily agricultural. The Niger River is of central importance to the economy although sometimes there is a risk from flooding. Along the river the cultivation of different vegetables is important, as well as growing rice and sorghum. Around 80 percent of the population is employed in agriculture. Livestock is an important activity, and the town is the centre of trading. Animal husbandry includes cattle, camels, sheep, goats, poultry, horses and donkeys. Dairy products are also important but the lack of processing units in the commune is a problem which may also suffer from various epidemics among animals and humans, water scarcity, and lack of pasture. The Niger River also provides an abundance of fish, and numerous fisheries are dotted along the river. The number of fishermen is increasing due to immigration of people to Ansongo and fish farms have grown in recent years. Crafts are mainly practiced by women, and include domestic leather, basketry, forge, pottery, mats, hides and skins for trade at the market in the town. Some artisans operate in the production of farm equipment, with plows, carts, daba, sickle, picks, shovels, stoves, etc. for sale in which farmers from the surrounding rural area in the commune will buy or trade their goods with.

Trade is important with many Arab Songhai and Tamasheq retail dealers, especially by women. Ansongo market trades in basic necessities such as sugar, tea, cereals, tobacco etc. A lot of these supplies are brought in from neighbouring Niger, Nigeria, and also from other areas of Mali such as Gao and Bamako.

== Transport ==
The town is served by Ansongo Airport.
