= Soboundou =

- Commune
- Location in Mali
- Coordinates: 15°56′00″N 3°59′17″W
- Country: Mali
- Region: Tombouctou Region
- Cercle: Niafunké Cercle
- Admin HQ (chef-lieu): Niafunké

Area
  - Total: 1,482 km^{2} (572 sq mi)

Population (2009 census)
  - Total: 44,899
  - Density: 30.30/km^{2} (78.47/sq mi)
- Time zone: UTC+0 (GMT)

Soboundou is a commune of the Cercle of Niafunké in the Tombouctou Region of Mali. The administrative center (chef-lieu) is the town of Niafunké.
