= Kolokani Airport =

Airport in Mali

Kolokani Airport Aéroport de Kolokani
- IATA: none; ICAO: GAKN

Summary
- Airport type: Public
- Serves: Kolokani
- Elevation AMSL: 1,457 ft / 444 m
- Coordinates: 13°31′25″N 8°02′45″W

Map
- Location of the airport in Mali

Runways
Direction	Length		Surface
Direction	ft	m	Surface
10/28	2,624	800	Gravel
- Source: Google Maps

Kolokani Airport (ICAO: GAKN) (French: Aéroport de Kolokani) is an airstrip serving Kolokani in Mali.

== See also ==
- Transport in Mali
