= Women's Initiatives for Gender Justice =

The Women's Initiatives for Gender Justice (WIGJ) is an international women's rights organisation that supports legal actions against gender violence through the International Criminal Court (ICC) and peace processes.

== Aims ==
Women's Initiatives for Gender Justice, based in The Hague, describes itself as networking with "more than 6,000 grassroots partners, associates and members across multiple armed conflicts", especially conflicts under investigation by the ICC, especially in Uganda and the Democratic Republic of the Congo. WIGJ's networking includes participation in Sudan, the Central African Republic, Kenya, Libya and Kyrgyzstan. WIGJ also has offices in Cairo, Kampala and Kitgum. Brigid Inder was co-founder of WIGJ, and Executive Director from 2004 to 2017.

== ICC support ==
In September 2019, Melinda Reed of WIGJ commented on the decision by ICC judges to proceed to trial against al-Hassan Ag Abdoul Aziz, a Malian accused of crimes against humanity and war crimes during his role as head of the religious police in Timbuctoo during the Northern Mali conflict in 2012 and 2013. The case against al-Hassan explicitly includes systematic sexual slavery of Timbuctoo women and girls. The Guardian described the case as "groundbreaking" while Reed described the case as "another step in a positive evolution. Every decision matters. We are writing the jurisprudence of the future now, so every case and every step is extremely important with regards to gender-based and sexual crimes."
