= Bourra =

- Commune
- Location in Mali
- Coordinates: 15°28′25″N 0°42′35″E
- Country: Mali
- Region: Gao Region
- Cercle: Ansongo Cercle
- Admin HQ (Chef-lieu): Tassiga

Area
  - Total: 2,323 km^{2} (897 sq mi)

Population (2009 census)
  - Total: 19,163
  - Density: 8.249/km^{2} (21.37/sq mi)
- Time zone: UTC+0 (GMT)

Bourra is a commune in the Cercle of Ansongo in the Gao Region of south-eastern Mali. The commune extends along the left (east) bank of the River Niger. It covers an area of approximately 2,323 square kilometers and includes 14 villages. In the 2009 census the commune had a population of 19,163. The main village (chef-lieu) is Tassiga.
