= Raz El Ma =

- Commune and village
- Location in Mali
- Coordinates: 16°36′N 4°28′W
- Country: Mali
- Region: Tombouctou Region
- Cercle: Goundam Cercle

Population (2009 Census)
  - Total: 4,121
- Time zone: UTC+0 (GMT)

Raz El Ma is a village and commune of the Cercle of Goundam in the Tombouctou Region of Mali. In the 2009 census the commune had a population of 4,121.
