= Mbabaram =

Mbabaram (Babaram) may refer to:

- Mbabaram people, an Australian ethnic group
- Mbabaram language, an extinct language of Australia

== See also ==
- Bambara (disambiguation)
