= Keibane Airport =

Airport in Mali

Keibane Airport Aéroport Keibane
- IATA: NRM; ICAO: GANK

Summary
- Airport type: Public
- Serves: Nara
- Elevation AMSL: 889 ft / 271 m
- Coordinates: 15°13′40″N 7°15′40″W

Map
- Location of the airport in Mali

Runways
Direction	Length		Surface
Direction	ft	m	Surface
13/31	4,020	1,225	Gravel
- Source: Google Maps

Keibane Airport (IATA: NRM, ICAO: GANK) (French: Aéroport Keibane) is an airport serving Nara in Mali. The airport is located 2 kilometres (1 mi) south of the town.

== See also ==
- Transport in Mali
