= Tonka, Tombouctou Region =

Tonka
- Commune and town
- Location in Mali
- Coordinates: 16°08′02″N 3°44′55″W
- Country: Mali
- Region: Tombouctou Region
- Cercle: Goundam Cercle

Area
  - Total: 1,023 km^{2} (395 sq mi)

Population (2009 census)
  - Total: 53,438
  - Density: 52.24/km^{2} (135.3/sq mi)
- Time zone: UTC+0 (GMT)

Tonka is a town and commune of the Cercle of Goudam in the Tombouctou Region of Mali. The commune includes around 22 settlements. The commune lies to the north of the Niger River and includes Lake Oro, a seasonal lake that fills with water during the annual flood of the Niger River. The name 'Tonka' is derived from a Soninke language term for king or ruler.

On 26 May 2026, JNIM militants entered the town and opened fire, killing one and injuring four. They also executed a quranic teacher the week before.

== See also ==
- List of cities in Mali
