= Kidal Airport =

Airport in Mali

Kidal Airport Aéroport de Kidal
- IATA: none; ICAO: GAKL

Summary
- Airport type: Public
- Serves: Kidal
- Elevation AMSL: 1,496 ft / 456 m
- Coordinates: 18°26′05″N 1°25′25″E

Map
- Location of the airport in Mali

Runways
Direction	Length		Surface
Direction	ft	m	Surface
09/27	5,690	1,735	Dirt
- Source: Google Maps

Kidal Airport (ICAO: GAKL) (French: Aéroport de Kidal) is an airstrip serving Kidal in Mali.

== See also ==
- Transport in Mali
