= Manantali =

- Town
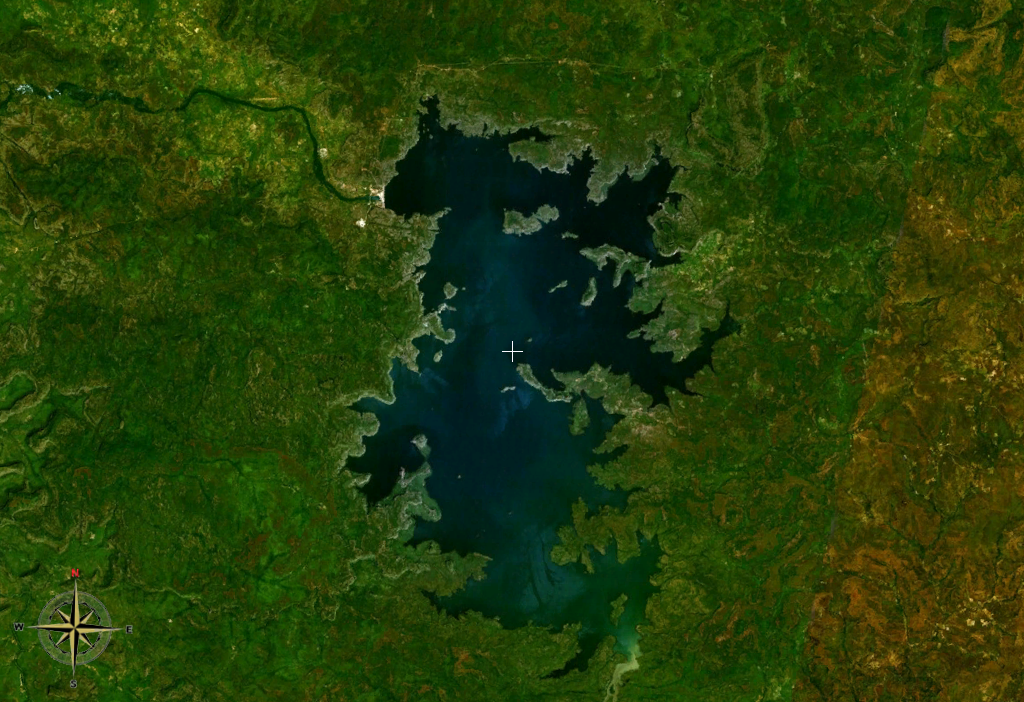
- Lake Manantali. The town is located on the north-western side of the lake.

- Location in Mali
- Coordinates: 13°12′N 10°28′W
- Country: Mali
- Region: Kayes Region
- Time zone: UTC+1 (WAT)

Manantali is a town on the Bafing River in the Kayes Region of south-western Mali. East of the town is Lake Manantali and its dam. It is a small town but there is a daily ( morning) market, some shops, a small petrol station and a campsite on the river.

== Transport ==
The town is served by Bengassi Airport.
