= Ansongo Cercle =

Coordinates: 15°45′N 0°45′E

- Cercle
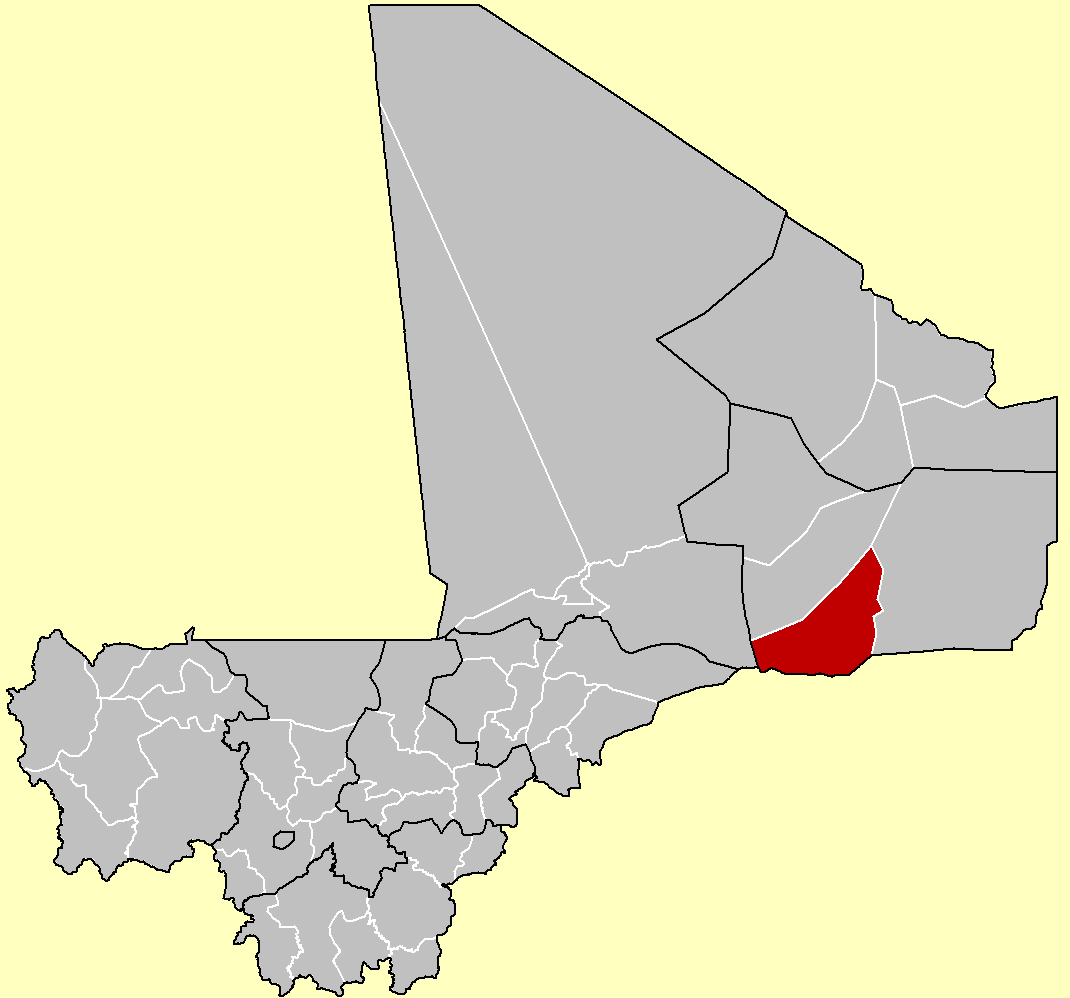
- Cercle of Ansongo in Mali
- Country: Mali
- Region: Gao Region
- Capital: Ansongo

Area
  - Total: 23,614 km^{2} (9,117 sq mi)

Population (2009)
  - Total: 132,205
  - Density: 5.5986/km^{2} (14.500/sq mi)
- Time zone: UTC+0 (GMT)

Ansongo Cercle is an administrative subdivision of the Gao Region of Mali. The administrative center (chef-lieu) is the town of Ansongo. The Niger River passes through the cercle and plays an important role in transportation and the economy in the region.

The cercle is divided into seven communes:

- Ansongo
- Bara
- Bourra
- Ouattagouna
- Talataye
- Tessit
- Tin-Hama
