= Bambara =

Bambara or Bambarra may refer to:

- Bambara people, an ethnic group, primarily in Mali
  - Bambara language, their language, a Manding language
  - Bamana Empire, a state that flourished in present-day Mali (1640s–1861)
- Bambara (beetle), a genus of feather-winged beetles
- Bambara groundnut, a traditional food crop in Africa (Vigna subterranea)
- Bambarra, a settlement on Middle Caicos, Turks and Caicos Islands
- Bambara (band), a New York post-punk band

== Persons with the surname ==
- Narcisse Bambara (born 1989), Burkinabé footballer
- Toni Cade Bambara (1939–1995), American author, social activist, and college professor

== See also ==
- Mbabaram (disambiguation), an Australian people and language
