= Battle of Tessit (2021) =

- Part of Mali War
Date	March 15–16, 2021
Location	Tessit, Mali
Result	ISGS victory

Belligerents
Mali; France	Islamic State in the Greater Sahara

Casualties and losses
33 dead 14 injured	20 dead (per Mali)

Between March 15 and 16, 2021, Islamic State in the Greater Sahara fighters clashed with Malian and French troops over control of a Malian military base near the town of Tessit, with ISGS jihadists overrunning the coalition.

== Battle ==
The attack on the military base began around midday on March 15, and was carried out by around 100 fighters on motorcycles and pickups. A convoy of Malian vehicles and soldiers planned to depart the base towards Ansongo when the attack was carried out, the surprise of which splintered the Malian troops into two convoys.

Following the news of the attack, two helicopters from Operation Barkhane departed towards the base, although the jihadists dispersed whenever the French forces arrived. The Islamic State had effectively destroyed the base, seen in photos published by ISGS on March 24.

== Aftermath ==
The day after the attack on the military base, Barkhane forces carried out airstrikes on ISGS positions. On March 17, the Malian government stated 33 soldiers were killed and 17 were injured, and the bodies of twenty jihadists were discovered near the ruins of the base.
