= Bara, Gao Region =

Bara
- Commune and village
- Location in Mali
- Coordinates: 15°48′54″N 0°19′46″E
- Country: Mali
- Region: Gao Region
- Cercle: Ansongo Cercle

Area
  - Total: 1,090 km^{2} (420 sq mi)

Population (2009 census)
  - Total: 12,354
  - Density: 11.3/km^{2} (29.4/sq mi)
- Time zone: UTC+0 (GMT)

Bara is a rural commune and village in the Cercle of Ansongo in the Gao Region of south-eastern Mali.
