= Talataye =

- Commune and village
- Location in Mali
- Coordinates: 16°32′N 1°31′E
- Country: Mali
- Region: Ménaka
- Control: Jama'at Nasr al-Islam wal Muslimin

Area
  - Total: 8,126 km^{2} (3,137 sq mi)

Population (2009 census)
  - Total: 13,907
  - Density: 1.711/km^{2} (4.433/sq mi)
- Time zone: UTC+0 (GMT)

Talataye is a village and rural commune in the Cercle of Ansongo in the Gao Region of south-eastern Mali. The commune has an area of approximately 8,126 square kilometers. In the 2009 census it had a population of 13,907.
