= Tin-Hama =

Coordinates: 15°31′N 0°25′E

- Commune and town
- Interactive map of Tin-Hama
- Country: Mali
- Region: Gao Region
- Cercle: Ansongo Cercle

Population (1998)
  - Total: 1,902
- Time zone: UTC+0 (GMT)

Tin-Hama is a small town and commune in the Cercle of Ansongo in the Gao Region of south-eastern Mali. In 1998 the commune had a population of 1902.
