= Goundam Cercle =

- Cercle
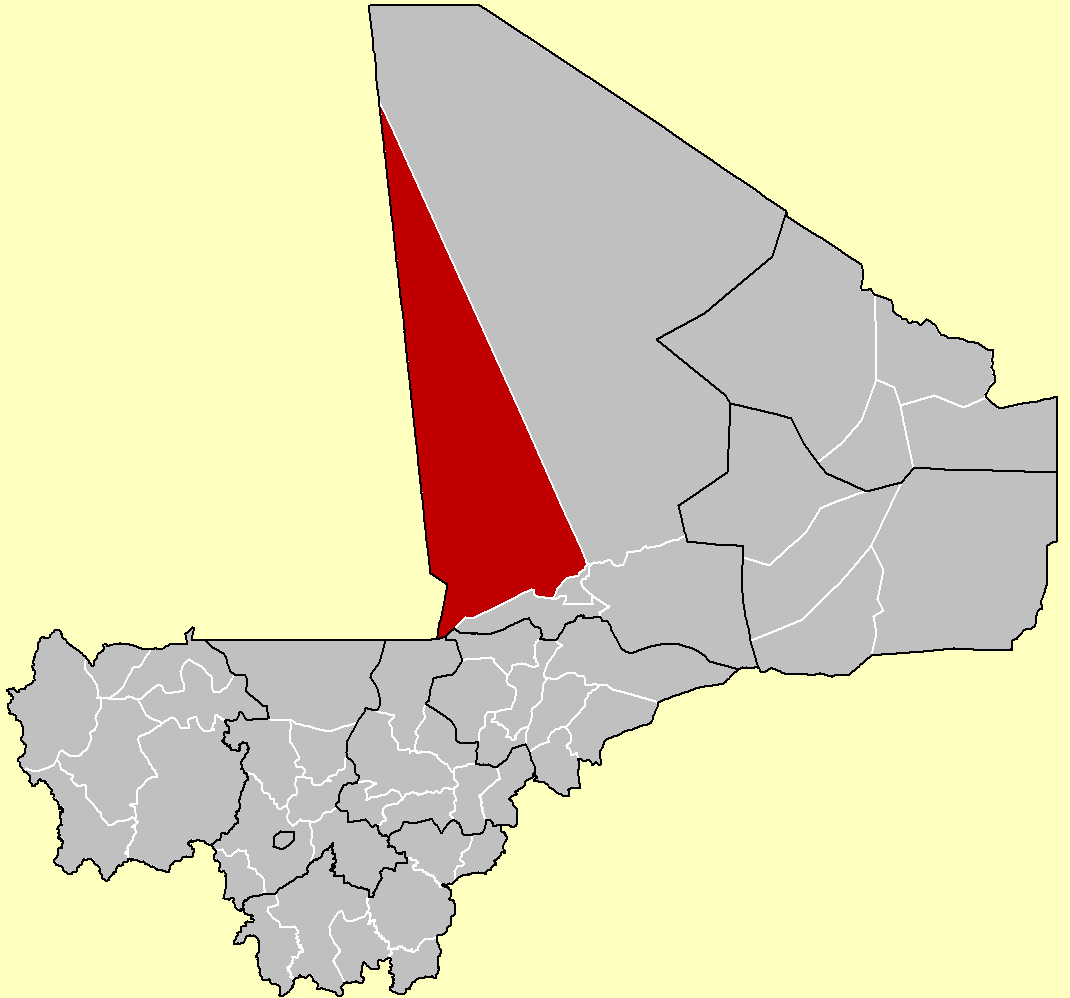
- Location of the Cercle of Goundam in Mali

- Location within Mali
- Coordinates: 16°25′02″N 3°40′00″W
- Country: Mali
- Region: Tombouctou Region
- Admin HQ (Chef-lieu): Goundam

Area
  - Total: 92,688 km^{2} (35,787 sq mi)

Population (2009 Census)
  - Total: 150,150
  - Density: 1.6200/km^{2} (4.1957/sq mi)
- Time zone: UTC+0 (GMT)

Goundam Cercle is a second-level administrative subdivision (cercle) of the Tombouctou Region in northern Mali. Its administrative center is the town of Goundam, although the most populous commune is Tonka. In the 2009 census, the cercle had a population of 150,150.

Although Goundam Cercle extends far into the north of Mali, the entire northern two thirds are covered by the inhospitable Sahara Desert. In the south, seasonal lakes and rivers along the northern edge of the Inner Niger Delta provide a meager living for the population, mostly occupied in pastoralism, farming, and fishing. The population is Tuareg and Maure nomads in the vast north, with settlements of Fula people, Songhai people, and Bozo people in the far south of the cercle. Seasonal lakes in this area include Lake Faguibine, Lac Télé, Lac Fatil and Lac Oro. There is an airport at Goundam, and a highway running towards Mopti far to the southwest and east to the regional capital of Timbuktu.

During the Tuareg rebellion of 2012, the government of Mali lost control of the northern part of the country, which was declared independent from Mali altogether as part of the breakaway state of Azawad by the National Movement for the Liberation of Azawad (MNLA) on 6 April 2012. The MNLA government was expelled from the region after June 2012, and the area continued under control of various militias and Islamist organizations.

Goundam Cercle contains sixteen communes:

- Adarmalane
- Alzounoub
- Bintagoungou
- Douékiré
- Doukouria
- Essakane
- Gargando
- Goundam
- Issa Bery
- Kaneye
- M'Bouna
- Razelma
- Télé
- Tilemsi
- Tin Aicha
- Tonka
