= Timbuktu Cercle =

Coordinates: 20°50′N 3°20′W

Timbuktu
- Cercle
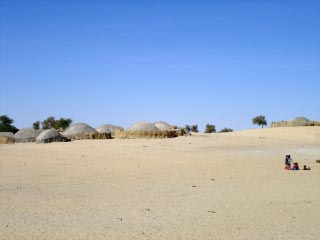

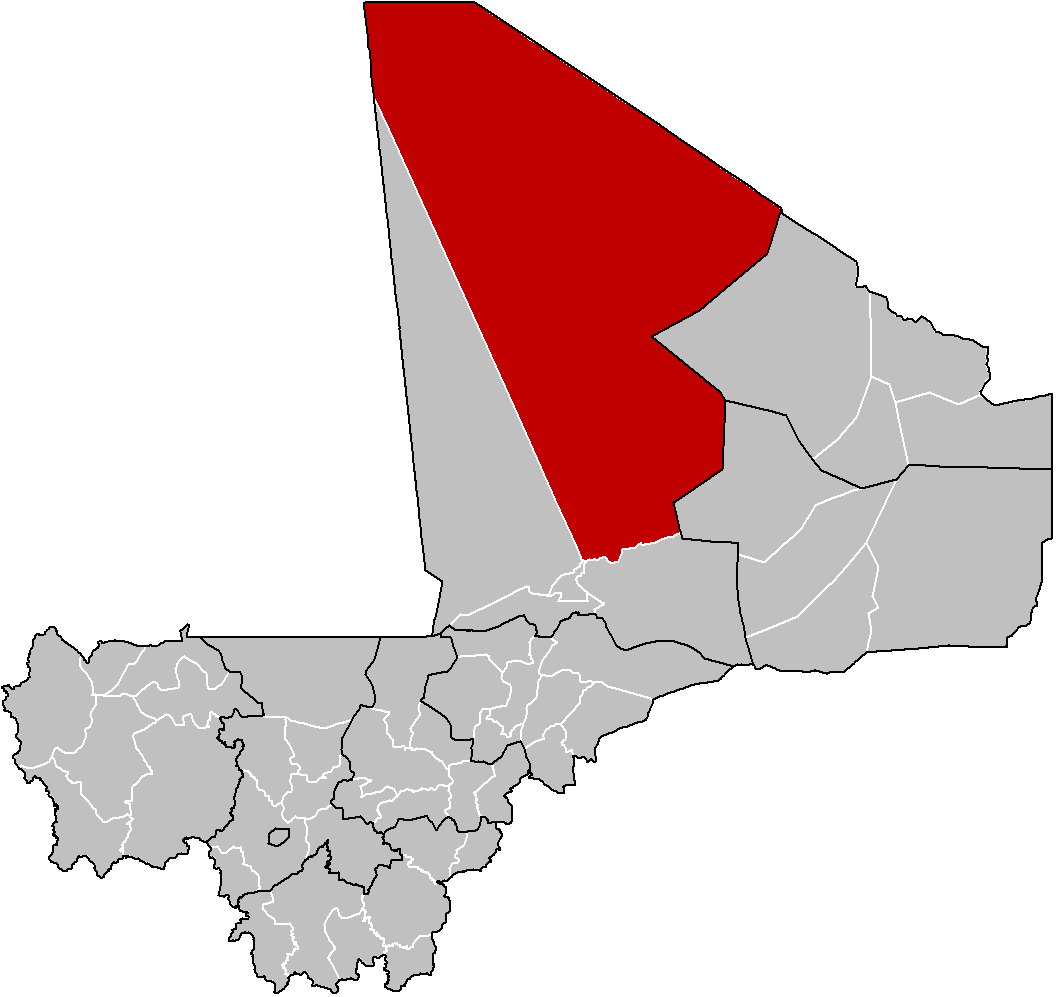
- Location of the Cercle of Timbuktu in Mali
- Country: Mali
- Region: Tombouctou Region
- Capital: Timbuktu

Area
  - Total: 347,488 km^{2} (134,166 sq mi)

Population (2009)
  - Total: 124,546
  - Density: 0.358418/km^{2} (0.928299/sq mi)
- Time zone: UTC+0 (GMT)

Timbuktu Cercle is an administrative subdivision of the Tombouctou Region of Mali. It is the largest cercle by area in the whole of Mali. The capital lies at the city of Timbuktu. The cercle is divided into rural and urban communes, and below this, quarters/villages. In the 2009 census the cercle had a population of 124,546.

== Communes ==
Timbuktu Cercle contains the following six communes:

- Alafia
- Ber
- Bourem-Inaly
- Lafia
- Salam
- Timbuktu
