= Niafunké Cercle =

Coordinates: 15°55′N 3°50′W

- Cercle
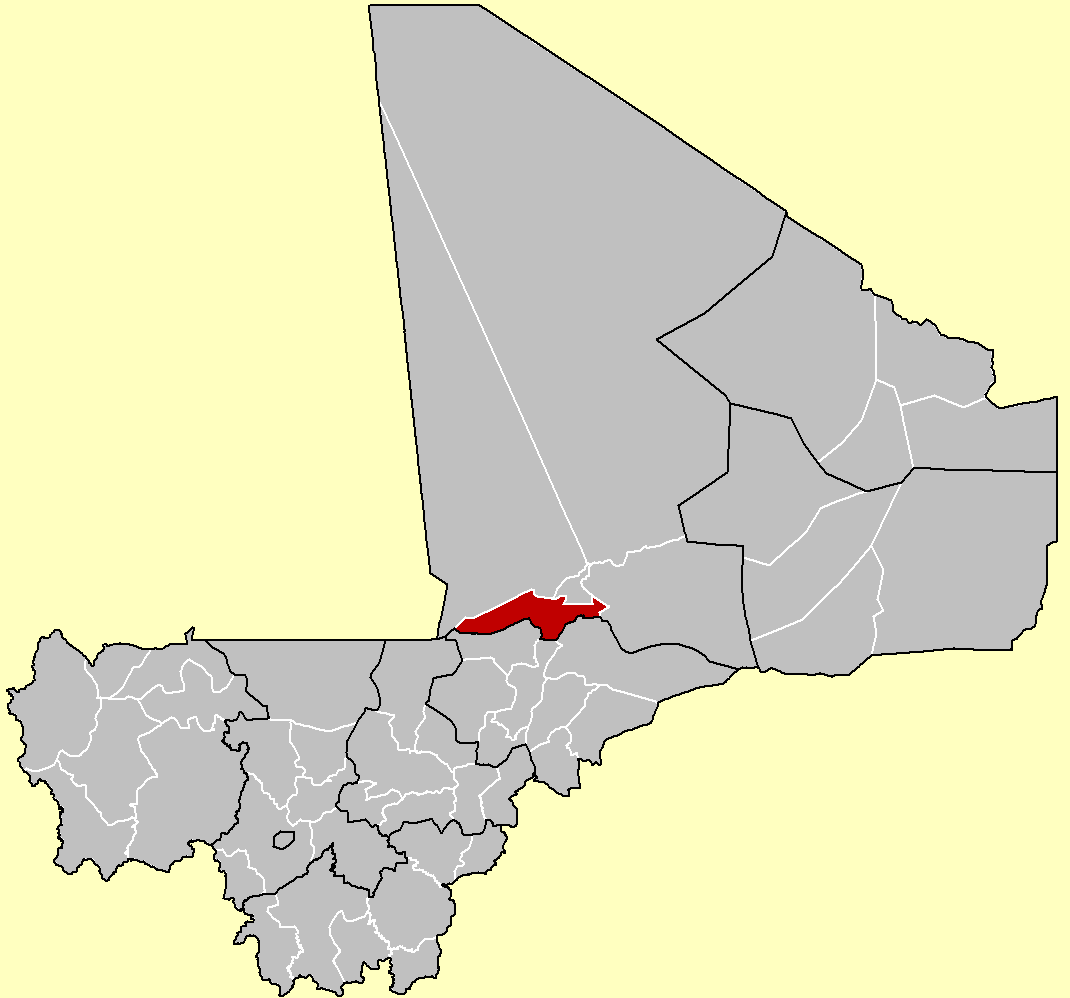
- Location of the Cercle of Niafunké in Mali
- Country: Mali
- Region: Tombouctou Region
- Admin HQ (Chef-lieu): Niafunké

Area
  - Total: 12,000 km^{2} (4,600 sq mi)

Population (2009 census)
  - Total: 184,285
  - Density: 15/km^{2} (40/sq mi)
- Time zone: UTC+0 (GMT)

Niafunké Cercle is an administrative subdivision of the Tombouctou Region of Mali. The administrative center (chef-lieu) is the town of Niafunké. In the 2009 census the cercle had a population of 184,285. The Niger River runs for 100 km through the cercle.

The cercle is subdivided into eight communes:

- Banikane Narhawa
- Dianké
- Fittouga
- Koumaïra
- Léré
- N'Gorkou
- Soboundou
- Soumpi
