= Goundam =

- Commune and Town
- Location within Mali
- Coordinates: 16°25′0″N 3°40′0″W
- Country: Mali
- Region: Tombouctou Region
- Cercle: Goundam Cercle
- Commune: Goundam

Area
  - Total: 101 km^{2} (39 sq mi)
- Elevation: 349 m (1,145 ft)
- Highest elevation: 460 m (1,510 ft)
- Lowest elevation: 260 m (850 ft)

Population (2009 Census)
  - Total: 16,253
  - Density: 161/km^{2} (417/sq mi)

Goundam is a commune and town in north central Mali, in the Tombouctou Region. It is the capital of Goundam Cercle, one of five subdivisions of the Region. In the 2009 census the commune had a population of 16,253. The main ethnic groups are Songhay, Tuareg and Fulani.

== Situation ==
The town is located on the Tassakan channel which runs west along the southern edge of the town center, draining from the Niger River (between October and January when it is in flood) towards the nearby Lac Télé which is approximately 4 metres below the level of the Niger. The Niger river town of Diré lies 35 km to the southeast, while Timbuktu is connected by highway 97 km to the east-northeast. Lac Fatil and Lac Oro lie to the southwest, near the Goundam Airport. Further north lies Lake Faguibine and to the south and west is the vast Niger inland delta, seasonal marshlands which feed the local lakes and rivers along this edge of the Sahara desert.

== History and culture ==
The town has a long history as a center for Songhay farmers and Bozo fishing communities, as well as settled elements of the semi-nomadic Fula, Tuareg and Maure peoples. Goundam was a city of the Songhai Empire, fell to the Moroccan invasion in 1591, and was later seized by Tuareg confederations from the northeast and the Fula of the delta region. Most powerful of these Fula states was the Macina Empire, centered to the southwest. The Toucouleur Empire conquered the area in the mid 19th century, and the French captured the town in 1894.

=== French conquest ===
Goundam was the site of a major reverse in the French drive to Timbuktu, known at the time as the "Goundam Massacre". In December 1893 French lieutenant colonel Eugène Bonnier took a small company of troops downriver from the French outpost at Segou to conquer Timbuktu on his own initiative. His advance guard, an even smaller force of two gunboats commanded by Lieutenant H. Gaston Boiteaux, went ahead, but contrary to their orders advanced to Timbuktu themselves, beating out Bonnier. Bonnier pursued him, finding Boiteaux had taken the fabled city prior to the Lt. Col's arrival on 10 January 1894. That day, after arresting his subordinate, Bonnier marched out towards Goundam with a small number African troops. They took the town 14 January, but on the way they had seized 500 sheep at a Tuareg encampment, and fought Tuareg raiders at nearby Tacoubao. In the early hours of 15 January, Tuareg warriors attacked Bonnier's camp, killing him, 11 officers, two French NCOs, 68 African Tirailleurs, and their interpreter. A rescue column, commanded by the future Marshal of France Joseph Jacques Joffre, recaptured Goundam on 8 February and Timbuktu four days later.

=== Refugee center ===
In the period following the Sahel droughts of the 1970s, and again following the 1990s Tuareg Rebellion, Goundam became a major relocation center for Tuareg and other refugees from the north of Mali. Many still remain around Goundam town.

== Attractions ==
Among the landmarks in Goundam is the historic mud brick Goundam-Tokossel Mosque.

== Agriculture ==
The seasonal wetlands near Goundam are, due to desertification and a low annual rainfall of 150-200mm, one of the few opportunities local farmers have for food cultivation. The staple here is mostly rice. With highly variable year-to-year rain, the Goundam area has often an unpredictable extents of fertile lands around seasonally flooded river branches, ponds and lakes.
