= Tessit =

- Commune and town
- Location in Mali
- Coordinates: 15°13′N 0°18′W
- Country: Mali
- Region: Gao Region
- Cercle: Ansongo Cercle
- Control: Jama'at Nusrat al-Islam wal-Muslimin

Population (1998)
  - Total: 6,717
- Time zone: UTC+0 (GMT)

Tessit is a small town and commune in south-eastern Mali. Located in Ansongo Cercle in the Gao Region of Mali, a 1998 census detailed that the commune had a total population of 6,717.

Between March 15 and 16, 2021, Islamic State in the Greater Sahara fighters clashed with Malian and French troops over control of a Malian military base, with ISGS jihadists overrunning the coalition and taking over the town.

On April 27, 2026, Jama'at Nusrat al-Islam wal-Muslimin (JNIM) captured the town during the 2026 Mali Offensives.

== See also ==
- Labbezenga
