= Niafunké =

- Town
- Location within Mali
- Coordinates: 15°55′52″N 3°59′24″W
- Country: Mali
- Region: Tombouctou
- Cercle: Niafunké
- Commune: Soboundou

Niafunké is a small town on the Niger River in central Mali. The town is the administrative center (chef-lieu) of the commune of Soboundou in the Niafunké Cercle of the Tombouctou Region.

Niafunké was the hometown of musician and farmer Ali Farka Touré, who moved there as an infant and went on to become the town's mayor in 2004. He invested much of his music income in an irrigation scheme. Niafunké is also the title of an album he recorded there in 1999.

Toure's son Vieux Farka Toure was also born in Niafunké.
