= Transport in Mali =

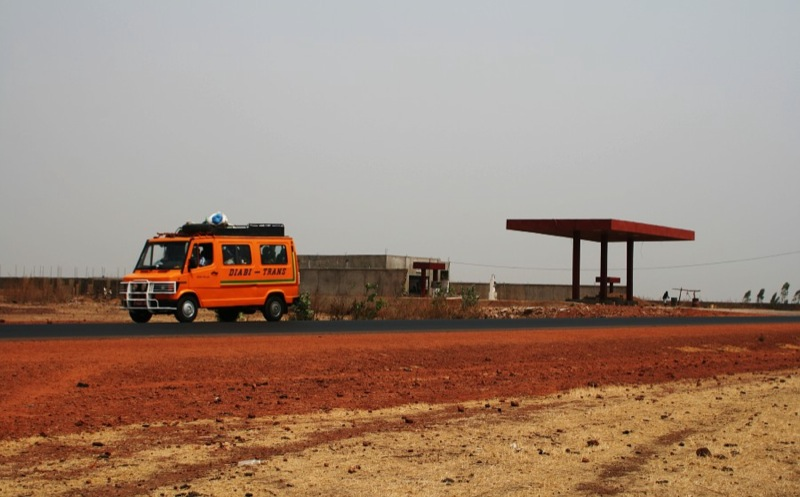
A highway heading south from Bamako, Mali.

Mali's transportation infrastructure is regarded as poor, even by regional standards, and deficiencies have limited economic growth and development. Nevertheless, improvements have been noted in the early 2000s. Most of the transportation in Mali consists of cars, planes, and boats.

== Railways ==
Mali has one railroad (the Dakar-Niger Railway), with 729 kilometers in Mali, which runs from the port of Koulikoro via Bamako to the border with Senegal and continues on to Dakar. The Bamako-Dakar line, which has been described as dilapidated, was owned by a joint company established by Mali and Senegal in 1995, with the eventual goal of privatization. In 2003 the two countries sold a 25-year concession to run the rail line to a Canadian company, which has pledged to upgrade equipment and infrastructure.

The Malian portion of the railroad carried an estimated 536,000 tons of freight and 778,000 passengers in 1999. The track is in poor condition, and the line is closed frequently during the rainy season. The line is potentially significant because it links landlocked Mali to the port of Dakar. It is increasingly of interest for Malian exports in the face of the disruption of access to Abidjan, Ivory Coast, as a result of civil conflict in that country beginning in late 2002. In the early 2000s, there also were plans to construct a new rail line between Bamako and Kouroussa and Kankan in Guinea.

As of 2013, passenger services in Mali were being offered three days between Bamako and Kayes via Kati and Diamou.

== Highways ==
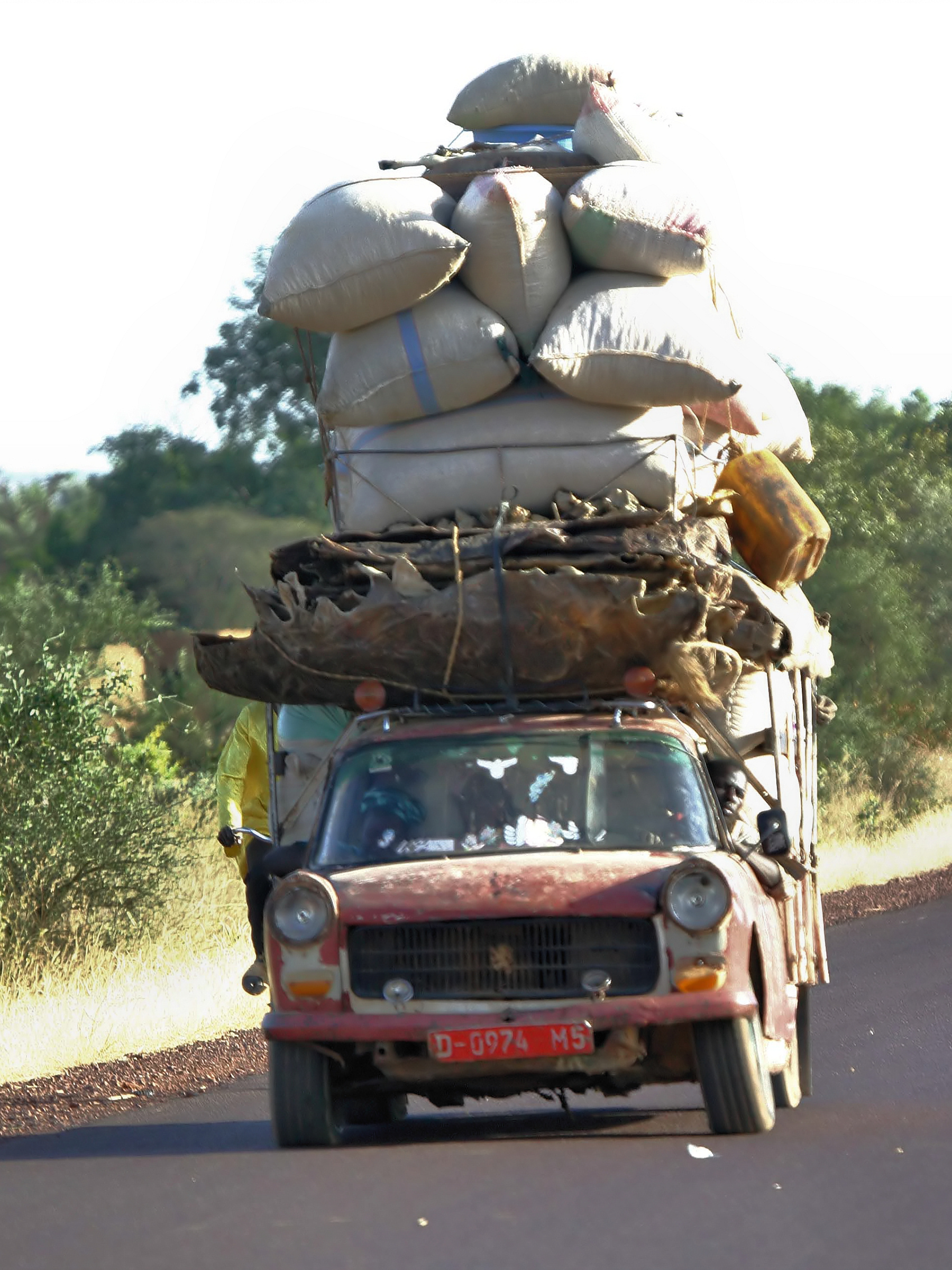
A typical highway scene in Mali.

Mali had a road network totaling about 18,563 kilometers in 2000, including about 4,450 kilometers of paved roads. Mali's main economic link to the coast is a paved road between Bamako and Abidjan in Ivory Coast. The European Development Fund is financing construction of a road linking Bamako and Dakar, Senegal. The African Development Bank is funding the construction of a road linking Bamako and Kankan in Guinea. There are also plans for a trans-Saharan road linking Mali with Algeria.

In general, road conditions outside of urban areas are hazardous, especially at night. Because of isolation, poor road conditions, and the prevalence of banditry, overland travel to the north of Mali is regarded as especially dangerous. Flying or traveling by boat is reported to be preferable where possible. Many of Mali's major thoroughfares in the north are little more than desert tracks with long isolated stretches.

=== Urban transport ===
Because rate of automobile ownership is low, and formal government run public transit is sparse, informal buses and taxis abound in Malian urban centers. Bamako in particular is known for its green and yellow taxi fleet. Other vehicles, including trucks, buses, motorcycles and mini-vans, function as taxis. In recent years small motorcycles, imported from China and most lacking licenses, have come to dominate much of Bamako's traffic. Inexpensive motorbikes are often the only affordable transport in Mali, with Chinese made bikes selling for US$700.

While the government formally requires licensing for both motorcycles and their operators, these rules are largely ignored. Some 500,000 motorcycles were estimated to be operating in Mali in 2009, with two-thirds of them inexpensive Chinese made cycles, known locally as "Jakarta"s, which boast better fuel economy but fewer safety features than more expensive Japanese or Western brands.

In the 1990s, Bamako banned horse carts, which caused an increase in hand carts on the streets. Recent road construction has included separated lanes for two wheeled (carts, bicycles, motorcycles), four wheeled, and pedestrian traffic.

=== Road fatalities ===
Motor vehicle accidents are relatively common on Mali's roads. The Malian Equipment and Transport Ministry reported that the first half of 2008 saw 254 deaths and 1,924 injuries on Mali's roads, following on 579 deaths in 2007 and 642 in 2006. The government has pledged 15 billion CFAF in 2009 to fund road safety, and has pledged to create a national road security agency to control highway traffic.

=== Police corruption ===
While police control barriers are a common sight on African highways, and while illicit demands for bribes at such stops are common in many countries, the main Malian highway heading south from Bamako to the Burkina Faso border was singled out in late 2008 as the worst in West Africa. A survey by the Observatory of Abnormal Practices (OPA) of the West African Economic and Monetary Union (WAEMU) found the Malian section of this road to have the highest number of police roadblocks with the highest average amount paid in bribes per trip in West Africa. An average of twenty-nine roadblocks, almost 4 for every 100 km, were reported from June to September 2008. The amount paid in bribes in the Mali section (per trip) was CFA F 31,509. Also at Bamako airport is common to ask for CFA 40.000 to be allowed to leave the country. While in other nations the customs officials were responsible for most stops, in Mali, gendarmerie (National paramilitary police) and the Police force were found creating the majority of bribe extorting roadblocks

== Ports and waterways ==
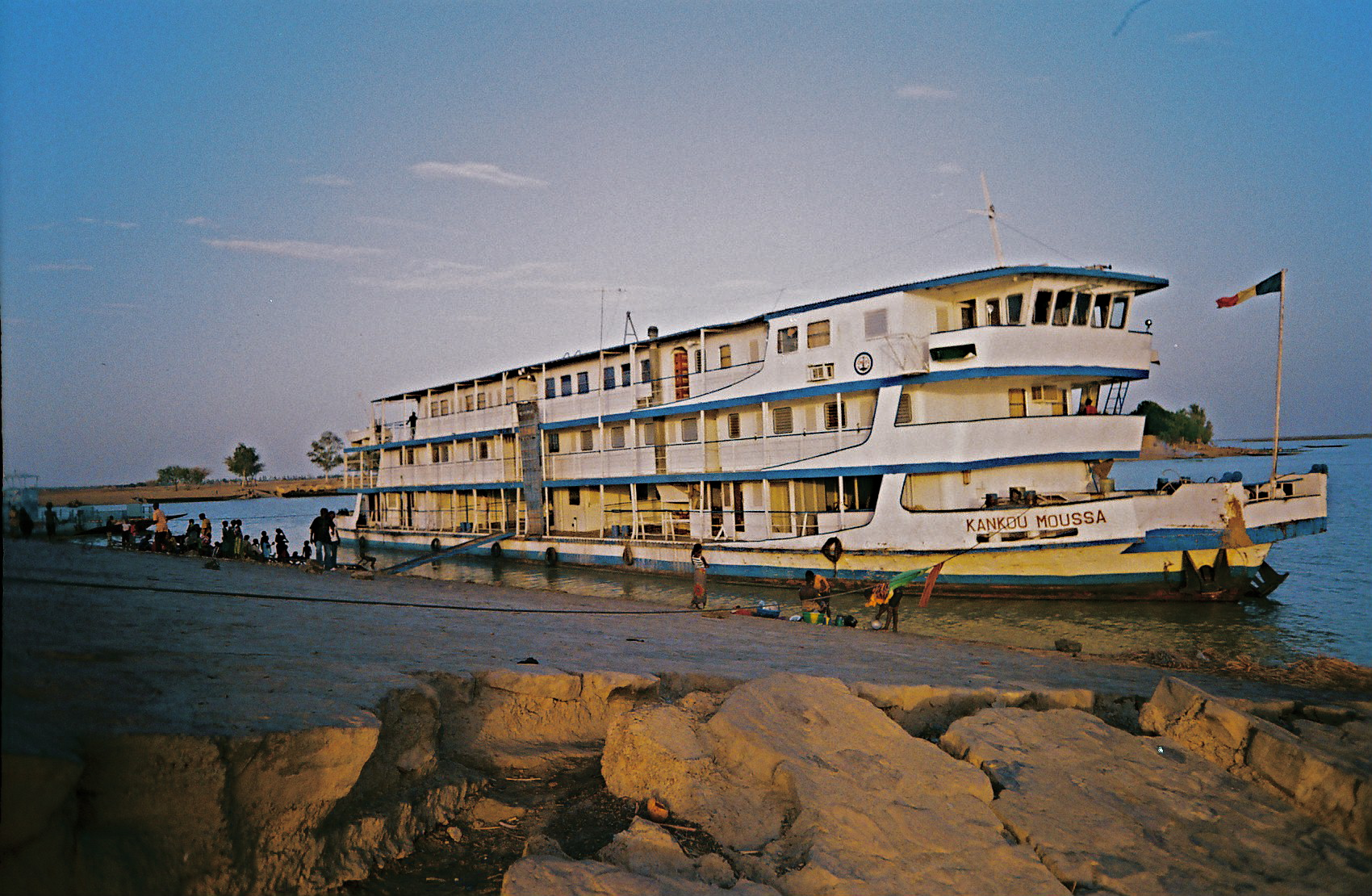
The Kankou Moussa river ferry on the Niger river at Korioume, 2008.

Mali has no seaports because it is landlocked, but Koulikoro on the Niger River near Bamako, serves as a principal river port. Traditionally, Abidjan in Ivory Coast has been Mali's main seaport, handling as much as 70 percent of Mali's trade (except for gold exports). Mali's export trade suffered when turbulence in Ivory Coast in the early 2000s interrupted that trade route.

Mali has 1,815 kilometers of inland waterways, principally the Niger River, some portions of which are navigable for medium and large shipping during the rainy season (June/July–November/December) in years of normal rainfall. Parts of the Senegal River also are navigable, providing year-round access to the Atlantic from Kayes to St. Louis in Senegal.

Cargo imported into Mali by sea must be covered by a bordereau électronique de suivi des cargaisons (BESC), an electronic cargo tracking note obtained before shipment and presented to customs during clearance.

== Aviation ==
In 2007 Mali reportedly had 29 airports, 8 of which had paved runways. The main airport is Senou International Airport in Bamako, which offers flights to neighboring countries and to Europe. As part of infrastructure improvements in 2002, the runway at Bamako was extended, and new airstrips were built in previously isolated areas of the west—Kayes, Mopti, and Sikasso. Intercontinental services from Bamako are provided by Air France to Paris and Turkish Airlines to Istanbul as of 2025.
