= Tombouctou Region =

Region of Mali

- Region
- Location within Mali
- Interactive map of Tombouctou Region in Mali
- Coordinates: 21°8′45″N 4°1′15″W
- Country: Mali
- Capital: Timbuktu

Government
  - Governor: Bakoun Kanté

Area
  - Total: 56,435 km^{2} (21,790 sq mi)

Population (2023 estimate)
  - Total: 1,047,917
  - Density: 18.569/km^{2} (48.092/sq mi)
- Time zone: UTC±0 (UTC)
- HDI (2017): 0.309 low

Tombouctou Region or Timbuktu Region (Bambara: ߕߎߡߎߕߎ ߘߌߣߋߖߊ, Tumutu Dineja) is one of the administrative regions of Mali. For administrative purposes, the region is subdivided into five cercles.

The region is part of northern Mali that was separated and declared independent by the National Movement for the Liberation of Azawad (MNLA) during the Tuareg rebellion of 2012. In the course of the conflict, the MNLA lost control of the territory to Islamist militias.

Tombouctou Region is world-famous for its capital, the ancient city Timbuktu (French: Tombouctou), synonymous to 19th-century Europeans with an elusive, hard-to-reach destination. The city gained fame in 1390 when its ruler, Mansa Musa I, went on a pilgrimage to Mecca, stopping with his entourage in Egypt and dispensing enough gold to devalue the Egyptian currency. This started the legend of a city in the interior of Africa, where roads were said to be paved with gold and buildings topped with roofs of gold.

== History ==
The city is located at the southern edge of the Sahara, near the Niger River, which has headwaters in the highlands very near the Atlantic coast before its long 3,200 kilometres (2,000 mi) journey to the north east, before finally turning south to reach the Atlantic. The riches of the kingdom were due to Tombouctou's position as the southern terminus of the trans-Saharan trade in gold, salt, kola nuts, copper and slaves.

Timbuktu's decline began with the capture of the city by Morocco in 1592. Many Islamic scholars were dispersed, some to Morocco. Morocco had difficulty holding onto the city, as the supply lines were long compared to the closer kingdoms vying for dominance of the region. Furthermore, the Moroccans did not establish a proper means by which to govern Timbuktu and their other holdings along the Niger bend. Ultimately, however, it was the rise of sea trade along the West Africa coast that doomed the overland routes connecting North Africa to sub-Saharan Africa. The city lost its economic base and its fine university was not enough to save Timbuktu from decline.

Cut off from major trade routes, the city retained an aura of spectacular treasure. When French explorers rediscovered the city in 1815, they were disappointed to find a sand-blown city of low mud buildings.

The region was marginalized under French colonial control, which ended in 1960. The French opened up shorter trade routes to the Atlantic, cutting into the trans-Sahara trading economy and people in the city.

In early 2012, the National Movement for the Liberation of Azawad and other militant groups opposed to the government of Mali swept through the region, entering Timbuktu without a fight after making a deal with local Arab militias. On 6 April 2012, the region was declared independent from Mali as part of the new country of Azawad. However, Mali refused to acknowledge the Azawadi Declaration of Independence, and the international community continues to recognise Bamako's claim to the region. In 2013, Timbuktu was taken over by Islamist militants affiliated with the Tuareg but was retaken by the Malian government after a year. In 2023, Timbuktu came under siege from more Islamist militants.

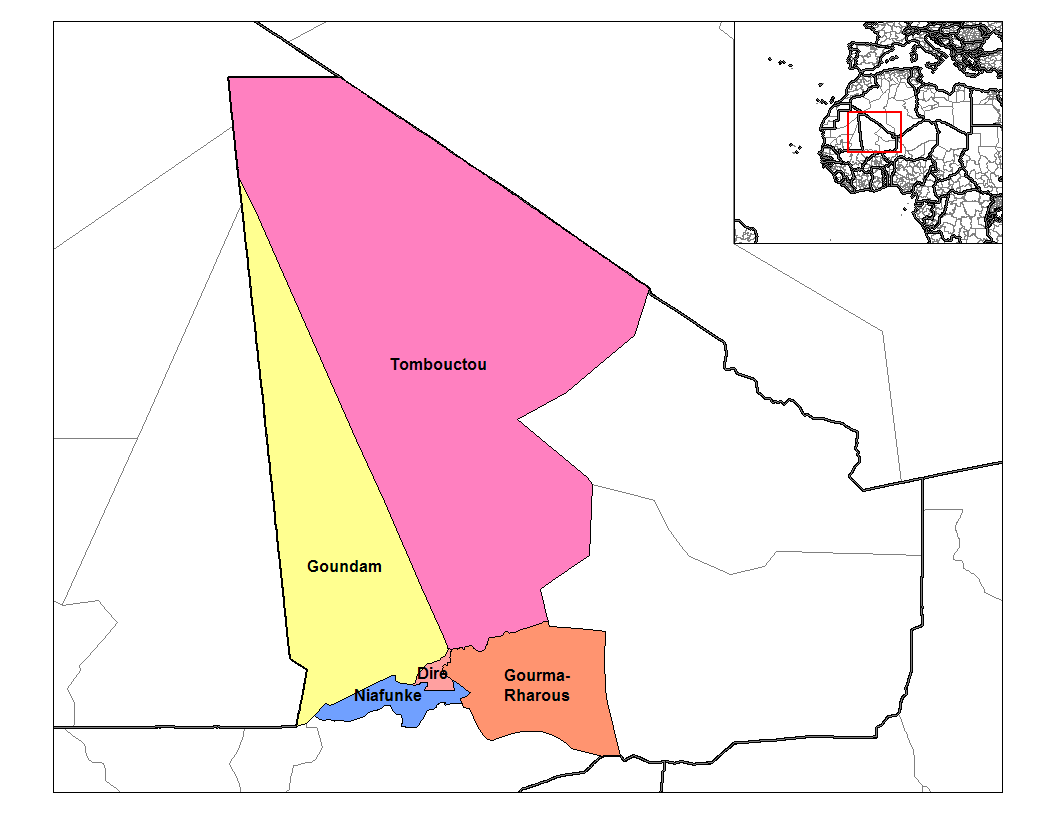
Cercles of the Tombouctou Region prior to the formation of the Taoudénit Region

== Administrative subdivisions ==
The region is divided into five cercles:

Cercle name	Area (km^{2})	Population Census 1998	Population Census 2009
Niafunké	12,000	119,900	184,285
Diré	1,750	76,960	111,324
Goundam	92,688	113,897	150,150
Tombouctou	347,488	68,228	124,546
Gourma-Rharous	45,000	63,634	111,386

The larger parts of Timbuktu and Goundam cercles (323,326 km² with about 134,000 inhabitants) were separated in 2016 to form the new Taoudenit Region.

== Demographics ==
The Tombouctou Region is the seventh most populated region in Mali, with a population of 974,278 in 2022. With a total fertility rate at 4.9 births per woman, Tombouctou has a lower TFR than the Malian national average of 6.1 births per woman.

=== Ethnicity ===
Ethnicity in Tombouctou (2022)
1. Tuareg (43.4%)
2. Songhai (39.8%)
3. Arab (5.50%)
4. Bambara (4.50%)
5. Fula (4.32%)
6. Bozo (1.22%)
7. Other (1.30%)

In 2022, the largest ethnic groups in the region were the Tuareg and Songhai. Minorities in Tombouctou include Arabs (Maure), Bambara, Fula, and Bozo.

Mother tongues in Tomboctou region (2022)
1. Tuareg (42.6%)
2. Songhai (41.7%)
3. Arabic (4.82%)
4. Bambara (4.76%)
5. Fula (3.99%)
6. Other (2.19%)

=== Religion ===
The 2022 census found that 99.67% of the population in Tombouctou was Muslim, 0.31% was Christian, and 0.02% identified with no religion at all. Islam is the dominant religion among all of Tombouctou's ethnic groups, with the Tuareg, Songhai, Arab, Fula, and Bozo peoples being almost entirely Muslim.

== See also ==
- Regions of Mali
- Cercles of Mali
