= Menaka (disambiguation) =

Menaka is a Hindu goddess.

Menaka may also refer to:

== Geography ==
- Meñaka, a town in Northern Spain
- Ménaka, a town in Mali
  - Menaka Cercle, an administrative subdivision of Mali
    - Ménaka Region, an administrative region of Mali
  - Menaka Airport, an airport in Mali

== People ==
=== Mononym ===
- Menaka (actress) (born 1963), an Indian actress
- Madame Menaka (1899–1947), Leila Roy, Lady Sokhey, one of the first non-courtesan Kathak dancers

=== Given name ===
- Maneka Gandhi (born 1956), an Indian politician
- Menaka Guruswamy (born 1974), Indian Supreme Court advocate
- Menaka Lalwani, Indian actress
- Menaka Rajapakse (born 1983), Sri Lankan actor
- Maneka Sardar, Indian politician
- Menaka de Silva, (born 1985), Sri Lankan swimmer
- Menaka Thakkar (1942–2022), Indo-Canadian dancer, choreographer, and teacher

=== Surname ===
- Sujani Menaka (born 1980), Sri Lankan actress

== Films ==
- Menaka (1935 film), an Indian film
- Menaka (1955 film), an Indian film

== See also ==
- Menaca (disambiguation)
- Battle of Menaka (disambiguation)
