= Battle of Takellote =

2017 battle of Mali War

- Part of Mali War
Date	July 26, 2017
Location	Takellote, Kidal Region, Mali
Result	CMA victory
Territorial changes	GATIA pushed entirely out of Kidal region

Belligerents
GATIA	CMA: MNLA; HCUA; MAA

Commanders and leaders
El Hadj Ag Gamou	Mohamed Ag Najem

Casualties and losses
50 killed, 33 to 39 captured (per CMA and MINUSMA)	2 killed, 5 injured (per GATIA); 4 killed (per CMA)
- 3 Civilians Killed

On July 26, 2017, clashes broke out between the pro-government GATIA Imghad Tuareg militia and anti-government Idnane Tuareg rebels from the Coordination of Azawad Movements.

== Background and Kidal Region campaign ==
In the Algiers Agreement of 2015, most Tuareg groups signed a peace treaty with each other and the Malian government. Despite this, clashes still broke out between the pro-government GATIA, composed of Imghad Tuaregs (considered a vassal clan of Tuaregs), and the Idnane Tuaregs (a higher-ranked clan of Tuareg) armed groups of the coalition Coordination of Azawad Movements (CMA). The most notable fighting between the two groups occurred in 2016, and then again in June 2017. The second spate of fighting caused between ten and thirty deaths on both sides, with RFI stating that "assassinations, kidnapping, and even branding ... incidents were increasing." These incidents were in Kidal Region, which is traditionally Idnane Tuareg territory, although the Malian government through GATIA wanted to expand control over the region and dilute CMA control.

On July 6, 2017, clashes between GATIA and the CMA left three people dead near Aguelhok. Renewed fighting broke out in Anefif five days later on July 11, with the CMA capturing the city. Negotiations between GATIA and the CMA restarted, but failed on July 19. GATIA insisted that Anefif should be under control of "neutral forces" like MINUSMA, the French Army, or the Malian Army. The CMA refused this, stating that the Malian army was not a neutral party in the conflict.

A majority of the violence was perpetrated by GATIA against Idnane Tuaregs aligned with the CMA, according to a Jeune Afrique report. The report alleged that the attacks by GATIA occurred during Ramadan, when CMA fighters had left to spend the holy month with their families. When Ramadan was over, the CMA was back at full capacity and had more of a desire to fight GATIA.

== Battle ==
Clashes broke out on July 26 in the vicinity of Takellote, about 40 to 45 kilometers south of Kidal. The fighting began early in the morning, when a CMA column headed towards the town. Takellote at the time was a stronghold for GATIA fighters, which the CMA suspected of planning an offensive towards CMA-controlled Kidal. The CMA benefitted from a numerical advantage and the element of surprise during the battle. Shortly before noon, the CMA seized the town, later releasing a statement announcing they "disabled" all GATIA positions around Kidal.

== Aftermath ==
=== Casualties ===
RFI reported that several dozen fighters were killed. AFP reported that GATIA had several dozen fighters killed, and several dozen taken prisoner. On the other hand, the CMA has two deaths and several injured. Oumar Ag Acherif, a CMA spokesperson, stated at least 50 GATIA fighters were killed and 39 were taken prisoner. Another CMA source stated at least thirteen GATIA fighters were killed, and four killed in the CMA, including the second-in-command to the MNLA, Mohamed Ag Najem. A resident of Kidal stated he saw fifty GATIA fighters taken prisoner, and three wounded taken to Kidal hospital. Fahad Ag al-Mahmoud, secretary-general of GATIA, mentioned that GATIA had twenty killed and that the CMA had two killed and five injured.

GATIA released a statement confirming they had fighters killed, some fighters injured that were taken to Gao, and that they had killed some CMA fighters. The CMA stated that they had captured prisoners, and urged the Red Cross to come visit. Wounded from the CMA were treated in Kidal, and wounded from GATIA were treated in Gao.

On August 11, Guillaume Ngefa, the director of human rights of MINUSMA, stated that the CMA had detained thirty-three GATIA fighters in the battle, including eight minors. The minors were returned to MINUSMA that same day.

=== Further clashes ===
The CMA attacked GATIA positions in Inafarak, northwest of In Khalil, on July 27. After this, GATIA retreated towards Gao. CMA fighters pushed further south on July 29, entering Ménaka, an Imghad Tuareg stronghold. The CMA faced no resistance from the Malian Army or Movement for the Salvation of Azawad, which controlled the town. The MSA stated that they remained neutral in the conflict between GATIA and the CMA.
