= Aklaz and Awkassa massacres =

Terrorist incident in Mali

- Part of Mali War
- Location: Aklaz and Awkassa refugee camps, Menaka Cercle, Mali
- Date: 26 and 27 April 2018
- Target: Daoussahak Tuareg civilians
- Deaths: 47
- Injuries: 2
- Perpetrator: Islamic State in the Greater Sahara

On 26 and 27 April 2018, militants from the Islamic State in the Greater Sahara attacked two refugee camps near Andéramboukane, Ménaka, Mali, killing forty-seven people, mostly Tuareg civilians.

== Prelude ==
Heavy fighting occurred in southeastern Mali's Menaka region in early 2018 between the Malian army, aligned with the French army, Movement for the Salvation of Azawad (MSA), and Imghad Tuareg Self-Defense Group and Allies (GATIA) against the Islamic State in the Greater Sahara. The massacre of four civilians in Inwelane, near Talataye, in February led to reprisal offensives by the MSA against ISGS. The French army stated on March 15 that the reprisal offensives saw 60 ISGS militants killed or captured. The heaviest fighting occurred during the battle of Akabar on April 1, where thirty jihadists were killed.

Conflicts between the Tuareg rebel groups and ISGS often stem from ethnic conflict between the Daoussahak Tuaregs and Fulani, with massacres being ethnically motivated. In April 2018, MINUSMA accused both movements of having summarily executed 95 people in Menaka region, along with looting and ethnic cleansing. Sixteen Tuareg nomads were killed in the village of Tchigin Bawel on April 18. Despite this, Bruno Guibert, the commander of the French Operation Barkhane, stated that attacks on civilians had significantly decreased in the Menaka region.

== Massacres ==
The first attack occurred at Aklaz (also spelled Akliz), when armed men arrived with 16 motorcycles and began shooting indiscriminately at residents of the refugee camp. An MSA patrol set out in pursuit of the attackers the next day, alleging to have killed four perpetrators of the attack, with one MSA fighter dead and one injured. Meanwhile, militants shot up the Awkassa camp as well.

== Aftermath ==
=== Death toll ===
The governor of Menaka, Daouda Maiga, stated that six to nine people were killed in Aklaz and thirty-one in Awkassa. Maiga stated that while the elderly, women, and children were shot, many of the dead were young men affiliated with the MSA. A Daoussahak tribal administrator stated that 43 people were killed, all of whom were civilians. The MSA corroborated this, assessing twelve deaths in Aklaz and 31 in Awkassa.

MINUSMA stated on April 30 that forty-seven people were killed and two were injured in the massacres. The next day, the French Army, GATIA, and the MSA corroborated the toll.

=== Reactions ===
Mahamat Saleh Annadif, the head of MINUSMA, declared the attacks "war crimes", with the French Army accusing the perpetrators of "terrorist attacks."

=== Perpetrators ===
While no group claimed responsibility for the attacks, the perpetrators are suspected to be the Islamic State in the Greater Sahara. All civilians killed were Daoussahak, and the perpetrators were Fulani. Maiga alleged that the massacres were reprisal attacks for the joint offensive by MSA and GATIA in February and March, along with an attempt to induce fear in Daoussahak populations of Menaka.

=== Further massacres ===
Two more massacres were committed on May 1 in the villages of Tindinbawen and Taylalene. GATIA and the MSA assessed that seventeen civilians were killed in the attacks, with several burned to death in their homes. Fulani rights organizations denounced the attacks, but also accused the two groups of committing attacks against Fulani communities, in particular in Niger. The MSA denied these incursions. On May 18, seventeen Fulani were killed in an attack in Aghay, Niger.

The MSA signed an agreement with Fulani supremacist group Ganda Iso on May 5 to ease tensions between Daoussahak and Fulani and to create a unified force against ISGS, but the latter retracted their portion of the agreement, claiming Mohamed Sidibe, Ganda Izo's signatory, hadn't been affiliated with the group since 2014.
