= Taghatert and West Inekar massacres =

Terrorist incident in Mali in 2019

- Part of Mali War
- Location: Taghatert and West Inekar, Ménaka Cercle, Mali
- Date: 15 January 2019
- Target: MSA militants and Daoussahak Tuareg civilians
- Victims: 37–40 killed: 27 civilians killed; 10 MSA fighters killed
- Perpetrator: Islamic State in the Greater Sahara (alleged)

On 15 January 2019, militants from the Islamic State in the Greater Sahara attacked two villages in Ménaka, Mali, killing at least 40 people. The massacres were targeted against Tuaregs.

== Prelude ==
In the Ménaka Cercle of southeastern Mali, most conflict in the area stems from three main groups as of November 2018. The first two groups are the Movement for the Salvation of Azawad (MSA) and Imghad Tuareg Self-Defense Group and Allies (GATIA), both predominantly Tuareg, which were both at the time allied with the Malian and French armies. The Islamic State in the Greater Sahara, on the other hand, are predominantly Fulani, and communal ethnic conflicts between Tuaregs and Fulani often scaled up to conflict with the MSA and GATIA against ISGS.

== Massacre ==
Around 4pm, a group of armed men on motorcycles attacked a MSA security post at the village of West Inekar, killing the seven Tuareg men defending it. The militants entered Inekar and began massacring its inhabitants, including women, children, and the elderly. They then attacked the village of Taghatert, about ten kilometers away. Ten of the people killed in the massacres were MSA fighters, and the rest were civilians.

All of the victims belonged to the Daoussahak Tuareg people. A Malian source from Jeune Afrique stated that members of the Iboghilitan tribe were spared. Later, fighting broke out between the MSA and GATIA against ISGS in the village of Amaloulaou.

While the Taghatert and West Inekar attacks were not claimed by any group, the attack came after days of threats by ISGS against MSA leader Moussa Ag Acharatoumane.

== Aftermath ==
Eighteen people were killed in West Inekar from the attacks, and nine were killed in Taghatert. Seven MSA militants were killed in West Inekar, and three were killed in Taghatert. The day after the attack, the Ministry of Territorial Administration gave an initial death toll of 10 killed. The MSA, in a press release on January 16, stated that the massacre occurred after clashes between the MSA and ISGS in West Inekar, and that several ISGS militants were killed as well. They also corroborated the death toll in West Inekar.

The mayor of Ménaka, Nanout Kotia, gave Reuters a death toll of 34. That same day, Jeune Afrique stated 37 were killed total, giving specific tolls for civilians and MSA per village. Kibaru, a Malian newspaper, gave a death toll of 40 after interviews with villagers. In a March 2019 report, the UN reported 26 civilians killed.
