= 2018 Talataye attack =

Battle of the Mali War

- Part of Mali War
Date	May 26, 2018
Location	Talataye, Mali
Result	Indecisive

Belligerents
Movement for the Salvation of Azawad	Islamic State in the Greater Sahara

Casualties and losses
4 killed 2 injured	8 killed
- 7 killed

The Talataye attack occurred on May 26, 2018, during the Mali War. Islamic State in the Greater Sahara (IS-GS) fighters attacked a festival in Talataye, Mali, killing several civilians and Movement for the Salvation of Azawad (MSA) fighters.

== Background ==
Eastern Mali, in particular Ménaka Cercle, came under control of the Tuareg militia Movement for the Salvation of Azawad in late 2016 following the MSA's founding that year. In 2017, the Islamic State in the Greater Sahara attacked more and more localities in the tri-point area - the area encompassing western Niger, northern Burkina Faso, and the Ménaka Region of Mali, following the ISGS's founding the previous year. Ethnic conflict between Daoussahak Tuaregs and predominantly-Fulani ISGS members also exacerbated tensions between the MSA and ISGS.

At the time of the attack, Talataye was under MSA control.

== Attack ==
On May 26, a group of armed men in three vehicles and motorcycles arrived in Talataye. The attackers spoke Fulfulde, Arabic, and Tamasheq, according to witnesses. The attackers, who were suspected of being ISGS, attacked an MSA post and a group of men resting under trees, using the nearby fair to catch the victims off guard. Around twenty people were killed in the attack, with the advisor to the mayor of Talataye stating four MSA fighters were killed along with eight ISGS fighters. A teacher in Talataye stated five civilians were killed sleeping under the trees. An MSA statement released on May 28 stated seven civilians were killed and two MSA fighters were injured, in addition to the toll mentioned by the mayor.
