= Amazragane skirmish =

2013 war in Mali

- Part of Mali War
Date	November 8, 2013
Location	Amazragane, Ménaka Region, Mali 1°53′48.617″N 25°34′03.95″E
Result	Malian victory

Belligerents
Mali	MNLA

Casualties and losses
1 injured (per Mali); 2 killed (per MNLA)	3 killed 4 injured 6 captured (per Mali)
- 3 civilians killed, 3 injured (per MNLA)

On November 8, 2013, clashes broke out between Malian forces and the National Movement for the Liberation of Azawad (MNLA) in Amazragane, Ménaka Region, Mali.

== Background ==
In early 2012, Tuareg rebels under the moderate MNLA rebelled against the Malian government, making massive gains in the early days of the war. The rebellion was hijacked by jihadist groups such as Ansar Dine and Movement for Oneness and Jihad in West Africa, and conflict quickly broke out between Mali, the MNLA, and the jihadist groups. In 2013, French forces of Operation Serval pushed the jihadists back, and MINUSMA deployed to cities and areas of northern Mali to quell the jihadists.

== Skirmish ==
A patrol composed of Malian soldiers, Nigerien peacekeepers, and French forces were responsible for the security of a fair in Amazragane, Ménaka Region, on November 8. Little is known about what occurred leading up to the clash, but Malian forces fought MNLA fighters around midday in Amazragane. Both Malian and Tuareg forces blamed one another for the attack. Malian forces alleged that MNLA fighters on a pick-up shot at the soldiers as soon as they saw them. MNLA fighters instead claimed that a small group of Malian soldiers broke off from the larger contingent to ambush a group of three MNLA fighters.

French and Nigerien forces were in the village at the time, and were not present for the ambush.

== Aftermath ==
The Malian Minister of Defense stated that three MNLA fighters were killed and four were wounded in the clash, and one Malian soldier was wounded. Another Malian military source reported the deaths of three MNLA fighters and capture of six others. MINUSMA stated at least one Tuareg was killed and two suspects were arrested. The MNLA acknowledged the deaths of three of their fighters, but asserted that two Malian soldiers were killed during the clash.

The MNLA claimed that six civilians were arrested by the Malian Army in Amazragane immediately following the clash, and that three of them were executed by the soldiers and the other three were tortured and seriously injured. French forces rejected the MNLA's claims, and stated that the MNLA likely attacked Malian forces first.
