= Battle of In Khalil =

Battle of the Mali War

Coordinates: 21.1886°N 1.0414°E

- Part of Northern Mali conflict
- Battle of In Khalil (Mali)
| Date | 22–23 February 2013 (1 day) |
| Location | In Khalil, Mali |
| Result | French-Azawad victory |

Belligerents
| MNLA; France | Arab Movement of Azawad (MAA) | MOJWA; Ansar al-Sharia (Mali) |

Commanders and leaders
| Bilal Ag Acherif | Boubacar Taleb | Oumar Ould Hamaha; Hussein Ghoulam |

Units involved
| (France) French Air Force | Unknown | Unknown |

Strength
| Unknown | Unknown; 32 armoured vehicles | Unknown |

Casualties and losses
| 3 killed 4 wounded | 3 killed 9 captured | Unknown |

The Battle of In Khalil took place on 22–23 February 2013 and was part of the first stage of the Mali War.

According to the MNLA, the first suicide bomber attempted to drive his car into a building, but the car was destroyed by fighters ahead of impact. A second car then drove into the group's local operations center and exploded, instantly killing four including three MNLA fighters and the bomber. The MUJAO immediately claimed responsibility for both bombings and said it specifically targeted the MNLA for their part in siding with the French intervention.

On 23 February, the MAA claimed to have attacked In-Khalil and taken full control over the area. The MNLA then renewed a counter-attack on Khalil. Over the course of the fighting French fighter jets regularly supported MNLA units. The battle resulted in the French-MNLA forces re-taking the town of In Khalil from the Islamist groups Ansar Dine and AQIM.

== Background ==
According to MNLA, his army was facing a coalition of MUJAO, Ansar al-Sharia and the Arab Movement of Azawad. Oumar Ould Hamaha, and Hussein Ghoulam were commanding the MUJAO-Ansar al-Sharia forces, while MAA claimed that one of its representatives, Boubacar Ould Taleb, present in In Khalil, was commanding MAA forces.

The MAA claimed to have attacked the town of In Khalil in retaliation for abuses committed by the MNLA against Arab civilians. He accused Tuareg fighters of seizing all the vehicles belonging to Arabs, of emptying businesses and raping women. The MAA claimed to have tried to negotiate with the MNLA but without success, while saying that is ready to join forces with French forces. In turn, MLNA denied the allegations, and blamed MAA for joining forces with MUJAO.

According to the Malian press, the abuses mentioned by the MAA took place in In Khalil, during a demonstration of the MNLA seeking autonomy. Arab traders who refused to join the march were then attacked by the rebels, who looted their stores. Then, MNLA fighters reportedly went to a camp where three women were allegedly gang-raped. The situation become tense with MNLA, when the general secretary of the movement, Bilal Ag Acherif, ordered the looters to return the stolen goods.

== The battle ==
On 23 February around thirty armored vehicles attacked from the north-east and north-west sides of the city, according to the MNLA. In the afternoon, the MAA claimed to have taken control of the village, but the MNLA claimed that Tuaregs defeated the Jihadists and that they were victorious. At the end of the day both sides claimed victory and claimed to control In Khalil. An unidentified convoy of vehicles then retreated to Algeria.

Finally, on 4 March the MAA admitted to have lost the battle, after the French Air Force had bombed some of their vehicles, killing 5 of its fighters. A day later, French airplanes bombarded the main base of MAA, 8 km from In Khalil, wounding many fighters.
