= Tinabaw and Tabangout-Tissalatatene massacres =

Terrorist incident in Mali in 2018

- Part of Mali War
- Location: Tinabaw, Tabangout, and Tissalatatene refugee camps, Menaka Cercle, Mali
- Date: 11–12 December 2018
- Target: Daoussahak Tuareg men
- Deaths: 43–47
- Injuries: 3
- Perpetrator: Islamic State in the Greater Sahara

On 11 and 12 December 2018, Islamic State in the Greater Sahara fighters attacked Daoussahak Tuareg refugee camps in the villages of Tinabaw, Tabangout and Tissalatatene, all in the Ménaka Cercle of Mali. Between 43 and 47 civilians were killed by ISGS.

== Prelude ==
Since the beginning of 2018, eastern Malis Ménaka Cercle, near the Nigerien and Burkinabe borders, has been a hotspot of conflict between Tuareg rebels of the Imghad Tuareg Self-Defense Group and Allies (GATIA) allied with the Movement for the Salvation of Azawad (MSA) against the predominantly Fulani jihadist Islamic State in the Greater Sahara. Because of this, the conflict between GATIA and the MSA along with their French and Malian allies against ISGS often became an ethnic conflict between Tuaregs and Fulani.

== Massacres ==
On the night of December 11 and the morning of December 12, several armed men attacked the refugee camps at Tinabaw and Tabangout-Tissalatatene. According to the MSA, the attackers arrived on 20 motorcycles, while the CMA described a group of 9-12 individuals. Several dozen Daoussahak Tuaregs were killed in the attack, with the massacre lasting an hour in total. Afterwards, the attackers set fire to the camps and the bush, before heading in the direction of Niger.

The attack was committed by Fulani militants, who only attacked the men of the camps, and spared the women. The Islamic State in the Greater Sahara were suspected of the attack as well.

== Aftermath ==
The MSA released a statement providing a death toll of 47 killed and 3 injured, with the CMA releasing an identical statement. Local elected officials told AFP the death toll was between twenty and several dozen killed. One official in Menaka region, however, claimed that the dead were buried by the MSA before the arrival of the Malian army and that the numbers were manipulated. Nanout Kotia, the mayor of Menaka, gave a toll of 43 killed on December 13. Human Rights Watch assessed the death toll to be 47 killed.

The attack was condemned by MINUSMA, who deployed a team to assess the massacre. They also called on the Malian authorities to investigate the killings.
