= Battle of Tinzaouaten =

Battle of Tinzaouaten may refer to:

- Battle of Tinzaouaten (2012)
- Battle of Tinzaouaten (2024)
