= Menaca (disambiguation) =

Menaca is a genus of wasp.

Menaca may also refer to:

== People ==
- Menaca (and de Menaca), a variant of the Basque surname Mena
- Ángel Meñaca, a soccer executive for Rayo Cantabria/Deportivo Rayo Cantabria recognized by Santander, Spain

== Places ==
- MENACA, a country grouping for the Middle East, North Africa, and, Central Asia
- Meñaca, Basque, Spain; a town

== See also ==
- MENA, Middle East and North Africa
- Menaka (disambiguation)
