= Bombardment of Ametettai =

- Part of Mali War
Date	March 4–5, 2014
Location	Ametettai, Kidal Region, Mali
Result	French victory

Belligerents
France	al-Mourabitoun

Commanders and leaders
Unknown	Omar Ould Hamaha †; Abdelwaheb al-Harrachi †

Casualties and losses
None	11 killed Several injured

Between March 4 and 5, 2014, French forces conducted a bombing campaign in the Ametettai mountains of Kidal Region against al-Mourabitoun. The bombings killed Omar Ould Hamaha, a prominent jihadist commander, and several other militants.

== Background ==
During the initial days of Operation Serval, French forces launched raids against Al-Qaeda in the Islamic Maghreb (AQIM) and other jihadist groups in their headquarters in the Ametettai mountains in rural Kidal Region. Chadian forces fought a major battle in the Ametettai mountains during the Battle of Ifoghas in February and March 2013. In January 2014, American-made Reaper drones bought by France were used in Mali for the first time.

== Bombardment ==
On March 4, French observation drones spotted a group of jihadists in the Ametettai valley. According to the French minister of defense Jean-Yves Le Drian, around ten militants had rocket launchers and an arms cache. French fighter jets then came back to Ametettai in the late afternoon of March 4, and launched airstrikes five hours later. The jihadists shot back with a single rocket attack, but it missed.

A Malian army official stated eleven jihadists were killed in the bombing. A few others were injured, and were able to escape. French intelligence stated Omar Ould Hamaha, a prominent jihadist commander, and Abdelwaheb al-Harrachi were killed in the attack. These statements were disputed by AQIM spokesperson Abou Assem al-Moujahir, who claimed Hamaha was still alive and that the French statements were unfounded.
