= In Khalil =

Village in Azawad where the Battle of Khalil took place

In Khalil Arabic: الخلیل Berber languages: In Xalil
- Border Town
- Location within Mali
- Coordinates: 21°11′24″N 1°2′25″E
- Country: Mali
- Region: Kidal
- Cercle: Tessalit
- Elevation: 442 m (1,450 ft)

Population
  - Total: 207
- Time zone: UTC±00:00 (GMT)
- Area code: 7FH352RV+26

In Khalil also known as El Khalil (Arabic: الخلیل, Amazigh language: In Xalil) is a rural commune, belonging to the rural commune of Kidal. Although it belongs to Mali, some houses are in Algeria. It is known for smugglers who slip through cigarettes, fuel, and weapons into Algeria. The village is also notable for being the site of the Battle of Khalil.

== History ==
In the spring of 2008, In Khalil was torn apart by a conflict between Arabs and Tuaregs following a brawl between a Bérabich Arab and an Ifoghas Tuareg that tribal mediation managed to calm down. In Gao, the Tilemsi Arabs are mostly grouped together in the fourth district, which was built relatively recently.

At the beginning of June 2012, according to the Toumapress agency, women demonstrated against “the obscurantists of Ansar Dine”.

On January 29, 2013, the National Movement for the Liberation of Azawad (MNLA) announced that the city of In Khalil was under its control.

On February 3, 2013, Ansar Dine number 3, Mohamed Moussa Ag Mouhamed, responsible for the implementation of sharia in Timbuktu, was arrested there.

In December 2015, several hundred Syrian refugees were reported in In Khalil.

=== Battle of In Khalil ===
In Khalil is primarily inhabited by Tuareqs and Arabs, for that reason occurred this war.

The Battle of In Khalil took place on February 22–23, 2013, and was part of the first Mali War.

According to the MNLA, a suicide bomber tried to crash his car into a building, but was detained. Then, another car exploded at the MNLA operations center, killing four people. The MUJAO claimed responsibility for the attacks, targeting the MNLA.

On February 23, the MAA claimed to have attacked In Khalil and taken full control of the area. The MNLA then resumed a counterattack against Khalil.

The MNLA reported that its army was fighting a coalition formed by the MUJAO, Ansar al-Sharia. Omar Ould Hamaha and Hussein Ghoulam led the combined forces of MUJAO and Ansar al-Sharia, while the MAA claimed that Boubacar Ould Taleb led its forces in In Khalil.

On February 23, about thirty armored vehicles attacked from the northeast and northwest of the city, according to the MNLA. In the afternoon, the MAA claimed to have taken control of the town, but the MNLA claimed that the Tuaregs defeated the jihadists and that they were victorious. At the end of the day, both sides claimed victory and claimed control of In Khalil. An unidentified convoy of vehicles subsequently withdrew to Algeria.

Finally, on March 4, the MAA admitted to having lost the battle.
