= Ikelan =

Former slave caste of Tuaregs

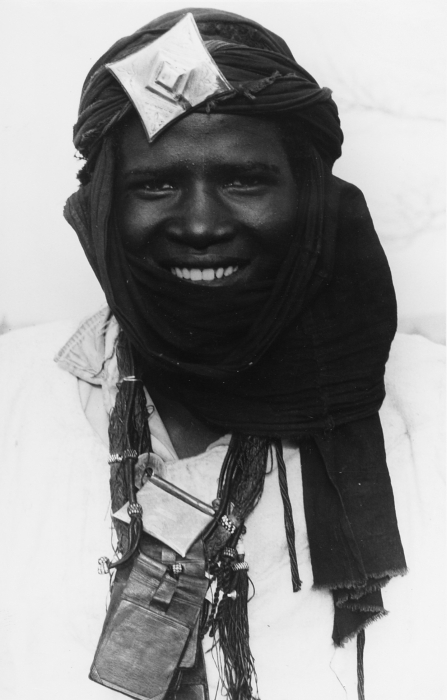
A Tuareg man of the Bella caste

The Ikelan (Éklan/Ikelan or Ibenheren in Tamasheq; Bouzou in Hausa; Bella in Songhai; singular Akli) are members within Tuareg society.

The Ikelan's situation is somewhat analogous to that of the Haratin within Maure society in Mauritania. Like the Haratin, the name "Ikelan", and to a much greater degree Bouzou and Bella, are exonyms (a name not used by that people themselves) with negative connotations. Historically the term "Ikelan" has been used to refer to the slaves of the Tuareg. Moreover, while they now speak the same language as Tuareg nobles, they are possibly of assimilated origin from other local neighbouring communities.

== Caste system ==
The Tuareg people have in the past had a highly socially stratified society, with specific social roles (warriors, religious leaders) or professions (blacksmiths, farmers, merchants) assigned to specific castes. The tiny aristocratic caste of warrior elite which once sat atop a pyramid of Tuareg society was decimated during the wars of the colonial period, and this, along with economic necessity, post-colonial border restrictions, and modern education, have broken down many traditional caste barriers.

Tuareg higher caste traditions value a nomadic life, warfare, study, animal husbandry, and trade. Consequently, higher caste communities travel, at least seasonally, if able. Lower caste groups, not limited to the Ikelan, are more likely to live in settled communities, either in Sahara oasis towns or in villages scattered among other ethnic groups in the Sahel region to the south.

== Formation and role ==
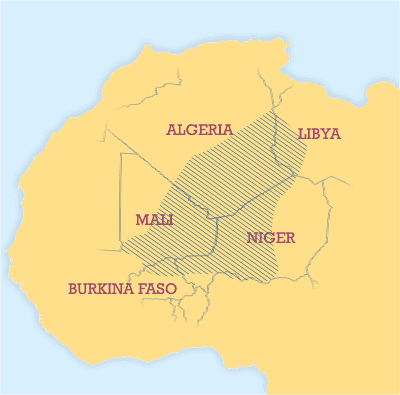
Tuareg people are spread across a large area of West Africa, settled and transient amongst other cultures.

As the Tuareg moved southward along the African continent in the 11th century AD, they took slaves as prisoners of war. Most slaves were taken from adjacent populations, as well from rival Tuareg Kels (tribal confederations). These éklan once formed a distinct social class in Tuareg society.

Servile groups came in two forms: domestic slaves lived near their owners as domestic servants and herders, and functioned as part of the family, with close social interactions. Additionally, entire communities became servile to aristocratic tribes, conquered in situ, formed by migration of Ikelan families or even other ethnic groups moving into Tuareg controlled communities seeking protection. Sometimes members of rival Kels, defeated in war, were subsumed as lower castes, but usually of higher level than the Ikelan.

Servile farming or salt extraction communities, somewhat analogous to European serfs were gradually assimilated into Tuareg culture, maintained Tuaregs herders during their annual transhumance cycle, or provided trade or farming centers for Tuareg clans. Prior to the 20th century, the Tuareg captured most individual slaves during raids into other communities and in war. War was then the main source of supply of slaves, although many were bought at slave markets, run mostly by indigenous peoples.

Some Tuareg noble and vassal men married slaves, and their children became freemen. In this sense, éklan formed distinct subsections of a family: "fictive children." Entire Ikelan communities, on the other hand were a class held in an inherited serf-like condition, common among some societies in pre-colonial West Africa, and often having little interaction with "their" nobles though most of the year.

When French colonial governments were established, they passed legislation to abolish slavery, but did not enforce it. Some commentators believe the French interest was directed more at dismantling the traditional Tuareg political economy, which depended on slave labor for herding, than at freeing the slaves. Historian Martin Klein reports that there was a large-scale attempt by French West African authorities to liberate slaves and other bonded castes in Tuareg areas following the 1914–1916 Firouan revolt.

Despite this, French officials following the Second World War reported there were some 50,000 "Bella" under direct control of Tuareg masters in the Gao–Timbuktu areas of French Soudan alone. This was at least four decades after French declarations of mass freedom had happened in other areas of the colony. In 1946, a series of mass desertions of Tuareg slaves and bonded communities began in Nioro and later in Menaka, quickly spreading along the Niger River valley.

In the first decade of the 20th century, French administrators in southern Tuareg areas of French Sudan estimated "free" to "servile" Tuareg populations at rations of 1 to 8 or 9. At the same time the servile "rimaibe" population of the Masina Fulbe, roughly equivalent to the Bella, made up between 70% and 80% of the Fulbe population, while servile Songhai groups around Gao made up some 2/3 to 3/4 of the total Songhai population.

Klein concludes that roughly 50% of the population of French Soudan at the beginning of the 20th century were in some servile or slave relationship.

== Contemporary conditions ==
While post-independence states have sought to outlaw slavery, results have been mixed. Traditional caste relationships have continued in many places, including the institution of slavery. In some areas, the descendants of those slaves known as the Bella are still slaves in all but name. In Niger, where the practice of slavery was outlawed in 2003, a study found that almost 8% of the population were still enslaved two years later.

=== Mali ===
In Mali, members of hereditary Tuareg servile communities reported that they have not benefited from equal education opportunities and were deprived of civil liberties by other groups and castes. Ikelan communities in Gao and Ménaka also reported systematic discrimination by local officials and others that hindered their ability to obtain identity documents or voter registration cards, locate adequate housing, protect their animals from theft, seek legal protection, or access development aid.

In 2008, the Tuareg-based human rights group Temedt, along with Anti-Slavery International, reported that "several thousand" members of the Tuareg Bella caste remain enslaved in the Gao Region and especially around the towns of Ménaka and Ansongo. They complain that while laws provide redress, cases are rarely resolved by Malian courts.

=== Niger ===
In Niger, where the practice of slavery was outlawed in 2003, a study has found that more than 800,000 people are still slaves, almost 8% of the population. Slavery dates back for centuries in Niger and was finally criminalized in 2003, after five years of lobbying by Anti-Slavery International and Nigerien human-rights group, Timidria.

Descent-based slavery, where generations of the same family are born into bondage, is traditionally practiced by at least four of Niger's eight ethnic groups. The slave holders are mostly from the nomadic ethnic groups—Tuareg, Fula, Toubou and Arabs. In the region of Say on the right bank of the river Niger, it is estimated that three-quarters of the population around 1904–1905 was composed of slaves.
