= Tagarangabotte ambush =

Battle of the Mali War on 16 November 2012

Coordinates: 16.2667°N 0.0500°W

Ambush of Tagarangabotte
- Part of the Malian Civil War
- Tagarangabotte ambush (Mali)
Date	16 November 2012
Location	Between Ansongo and Ménaka, Mali
Result	MLNA victory

Belligerents
Azawad: MNLA	Islamists: MOJWA; AQIM

Commanders and leaders
(Azawad) Machkanani Ag Balla (Azawad) Moulay Ag Sidi Molla	Mokhtar Belmokhtar; Omar Ould Hamaha

Strength
Two brigades 60 pickups	Unknown

Casualties and losses
9 wounded 1 pickup destroyed (according to the MNLA)	13–20 killed 17–70 wounded 3 pick-up trucks destroyed (according to the MNLA)

The Ambush of Tagarangabotte took place during the Internal conflict in Azawad. A MUJAO column en route to Ménaka fell into an ambush by the MNLA.

== The ambush ==
MUJAO launched an attack on 16 November against the independence MLNA forces in Ménaka, while the latter continued their attacks aimed at retaking the town of Gao. According to statements by Moussa Ag Assarid, in charge of Communication and Information of the MLNA, on 16 November at 10 am, a column of MUJAO vehicles was ambushed by the MNLA at Tagarangabotte, in the east, from Ansongo on the road to Ménaka. According to the first assessment of the MNLA, none of its fighters were killed, but nine were wounded and one vehicle was destroyed, while the Islamists had more than 20 dead and dozens wounded and three vehicles destroyed.

MNLA spokesman Hama Ag Sid'Ahmed said:"Two armed MNLA brigades led respectively by the Deputy Chief of Staff, Machkanani Ag Balla and the leader of the commando groups, Colonel Moulay Ag Sidi Molla opened crossfire early this morning November 16 around 11 am in the locality of Ansongo and of its environs (near the town of Gao) held by terrorist groups of Mujao and those of Belmokhtar."

In an interview with Le Temps de l'Agérie, published on 19 November 2012, Hama Ag Sid'Ahmed stated: "MNLA troops are positioning themselves against the terrorist groups that have gathered around Ansongo (one position 30 km away and another 50). In the morning, MNLA mobile troops opened fire on both positions of terrorist groups in the area. The MNLA opens crossfire. The terrorist groups had initially sent the new recruits to the fire. The real terrorists stayed behind. It was only mid-day on November 16, when the terrorists noticed that their recruits were falling and that the terrorist ambulances quickly took over to evacuate a few dozen dead and nearly 60 to 70 wounded. Some terrorist leaders had come forward and engaged in hostilities. These are those who came to create the Mujao with the help, Pakistanis (instructors and strategists), Tunisians and Moroccans, including those who had been rejected by Western Sahara officials. Some fighters and heavy weapons belonging to the group of Benlmoctar entered the fights against the Tuareg towards the end of the day of November 16th. There was a coalition of terrorists coming from all over against the Tuaregs. It must be said that the MNLA Chief of Staff, Machkanani Ag Balla, went straight with his group to join the terrorist camp. And the other MNLA brigades also followed. The fighting was very violent. A huge fire blanket was coming from both sides. The MNLA, at the beginning of the day of 17 November, had taken account of its losses. Indeed, there were 3 seriously wounded and 6 light and no death was lamented in the ranks of Tuareg fighters during these fights."

According to Ibrahim Ag Assakeh, a member of an MNLA delegation in Ouagadougou, the ambush was happened 50 kilometers west of Ansongo, 13 MUJAO fighters were killed and 17 wounded, as against 9 wounded men on the MNLA side, including a serious one. He also added that the fighting continued . Colonel Mechkanine, number 2 of the MNLA staff, was among the wounded. The success of the MNLA, however, seems to have been only temporary and insufficient to stop the Islamist offensive, according to a security source from Burkina Faso, the same day the MUJAO attacked elements of the MNLA in the village of Idelimane to 80 kilometers of Ménaka, the last bastion of the MNLA. According to the same source, "The Mujao has taken a lot of prisoners and taken two vehicles, there have been deaths."
