= Fall of Andéramboukane =

Coordinates: 15.9167°N 2.4000°E

- Part of 2012 Northern Mali conflict
- Fall of Andéramboukane (Mali)
Date	26 January 2012
Location	Andéramboukane, Mali
Result	Tuareg victory: The city was captured by the MNLA.

Belligerents
Azawad: MNLA	Mali

Strength
Unknown	40 men

Casualties and losses
2 wounded	8–40 captured 3 armoured vehicles captured

On 26 January 2012, the city of Andéramboukane was attacked by MNLA rebels. In its statement, the MNLA says that after three hours of fighting, its fighters have captured the majority of Malian soldiers, and the city, including a lieutenant and a chief warrant officer. They further claimed to have seized three armored vehicles and ammunition.
