= Battle of Menaka =

Battle of Menaka may refer to:

- Battle of Menaka (January 2012), Menaka, Mali; an attack by Azawad that started the Toureg rebellion
- Battle of Menaka (November 2012), Menaka, Mali; the last battle and defeat of the state of Azawad
- 2019 Ménaka attack, Menaka Region, Mali; an attack by the Islamic State

== See also ==
- Menaka (disambiguation)
