= Dawsahak =

Dawsahak may mean:

- the Dawsahak people (Idaksahak)
- the Dawsahak language (Tadaksahak)
