= Battle of Tinzaouaten (2024) =

Battle of the Mali War

- Part of the Mali War
Date	25–27 July 2024
Location	Outskirts of Tinzaouaten, Mali 19°56′36″N 2°42′07″E
Result	CSP/JNIM victory
Territorial changes	CSP takes control of Tinzaouaten and territory further south in Kidal Region.

Belligerents
CSP-DPA: MNLA; HCUA; MAA; GATIA 2; Jama'at Nasr al-Islam wal-Muslimin	Wagner Group; Mali

Commanders and leaders
Alghabass Ag Intalla Sedane Ag Hita; Abderahmane Zaza	Anton Yelizarov (Note: According to some Russian pro-Wagner Telegram channels, Yelizarov was killed. According to Russian military correspondents, Elizarov was taken as POW and exchanged. There is currently no confirmed information about his fate.); Sergei Shevchenko †

Strength
1,000+ (per Wagner Group)	75+ Unknown

Casualties and losses
Per CSP: 9 CSP killed 12 CSP injured Per Mali: 20+ rebels killed Per NYT: 18 CSP killed 45 CSP wounded	Per Russian sources: 25–82+ killed Dozens killed and injured Per CSP: 84 killed 47 killed Per JNIM: 50 killed 10 killed Per NYT: 46+ killed 2 captured 24+ killed 9 captured
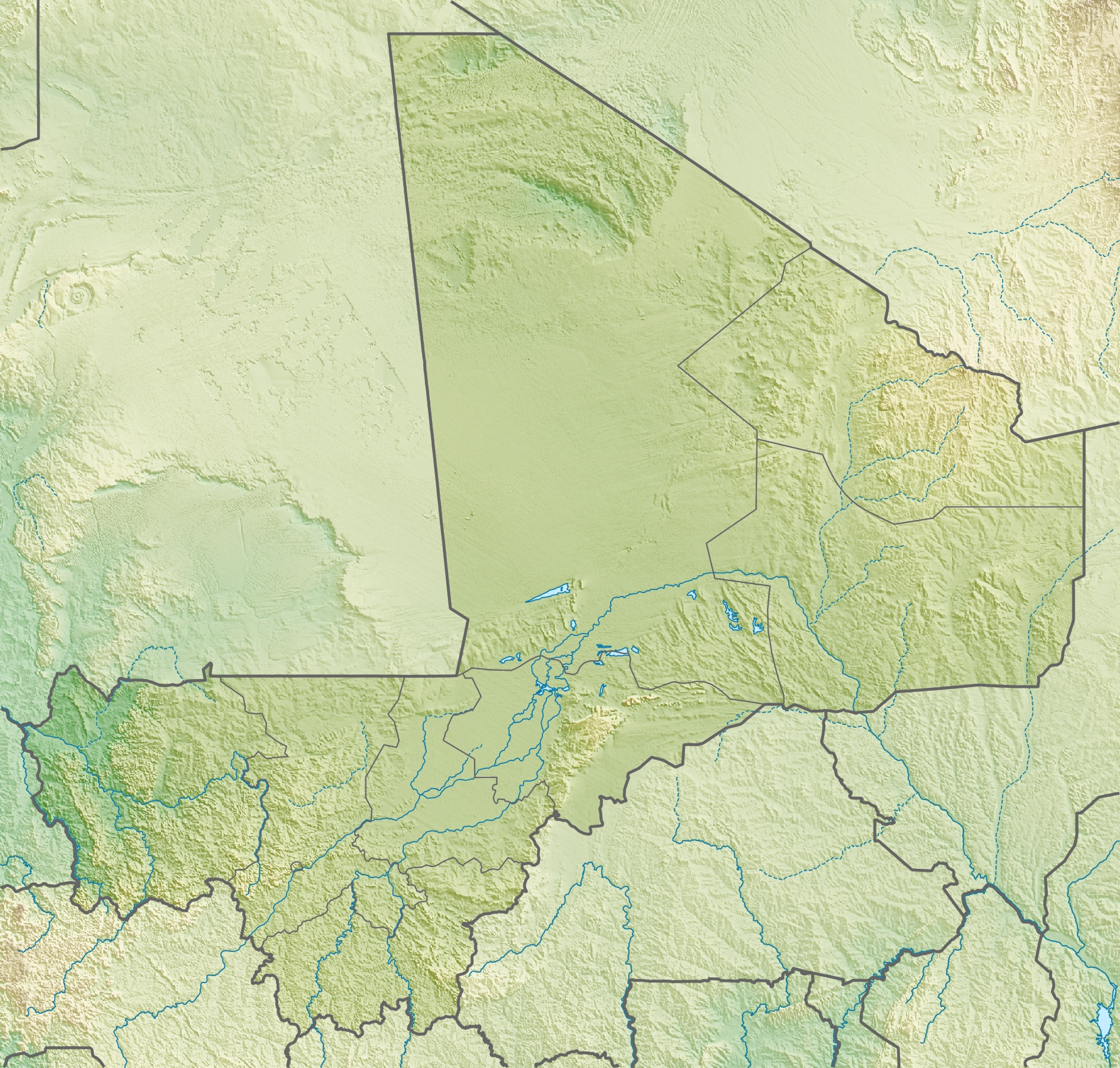
- Location within Mali

The battle of Tinzaouaten was fought between the rebel coalition Strategic Framework for the Defense of the People of Azawad (CSP-DPA), and the Malian Armed Forces (FAMa) backed by the Wagner Group, a Russian state-funded mercenary group. It took place in the outskirts of Tinzaouaten, a commune near the Algeria–Mali border. The Sahelien branch of al-Qaeda, Jama'at Nasr al-Islam wal-Muslimin (JNIM), also claims to have taken part in the battle against the Malian and Wagner forces, but CSP denied their involvement.

The battle began on 25 July 2024, when CSP rebels ambushed a military convoy transporting Malian and Wagner personnel to Tinzaouaten. The ensuing fighting saw dozens of Malian and Wagner forces killed, injured or captured and resulted in the rebels claiming control of the commune. FAMa acknowledged that it suffered heavy losses, while inflicting over 20 casualties on the rebels. CSP claimed that around 84 Wagner mercenaries and 47 Malian soldiers were killed. The Wagner Group's death toll in the battle varied in reports by Russian Telegram sources, which said that it was between 20 and 80.

According to the pro-Russian propaganda outlet African Initiative, the Wagner Group suffered at least 25 deaths, making the battle their most significant loss in Mali since their deployment in 2021 and one of the deadliest attacks on Russian personnel in Africa since 2017.

== Battle ==
=== Prelude ===
On 20 July, a convoy of nearly 20 vehicles carrying FAMa soldiers and Wagner mercenaries engaged in a series of search operations in northern Mali, mainly looking for Tuareg rebels who held territory in the strongholds of Inafarak and Tinzaouten. According to the Wagner Group, fighting began on 22 July and involved its 13th Storm Brigade. The mercenaries were commanded by Sergei Shevchenko, whose call sign was "Pond", and successfully defeated most of the rebels, whom they referred to as "Islamists", forcing the rest to retreat.

By 23 July, Inafarak was captured by Malian forces and the convoy moved towards Boghassa. It was attacked by an improvised explosive device near the Tamassahart valley and one armoured personnel carrier was disabled, but the convoy continued and moved towards Tinzaouaten.

=== Ambush ===
On 25 July at 14:50 GMT, Tuareg rebels ambushed the convoy while heading to Tinzaouaten, 12 miles (19 km) west of the commune. Ten Malian soldiers and five mercenaries were estimated to have died in the ambush, and a number of vehicles were disabled. A rescue helicopter was dispatched to evacuate the wounded. Russian and FAMa forces were forced into a low ground position with little natural barriers while Tuareg snipers were positioned on the high ground. Civilians in the commune evacuated.

=== Regrouping and subsequent battle ===
Both sides were forced to retreat due to a dust storm in the area, and Algerian border forces increased their presence in the area. The Wagner Group said that this allowed the rebels to regroup and increase their numbers to over 1,000, and additional Wagner mercenaries were also deployed. The Alliance of Sahel States claimed that FAMa repelled the ambush and inflicted heavy casualties on Tuareg forces during the battle, with the group abandoning the bodies of its fighters.

According to a statement from the CSP on 27 July, Tuareg forces seized armoured vehicles, tankers, and trucks during the fighting from 25–26 July. FAMa said that two of its soldiers were killed and ten others were injured in a rebel attack on 26 July, while 20 rebels were also killed and several vehicles were disabled.

The CSP also claimed that they damaged a helicopter carrying wounded Wagner personnel, causing it to crash in Kidal. FAMa acknowledged the loss, claiming that a Mil Mi-24 helicopter crashed during a routine mission resulting in no fatalities. Meanwhile, the Wagner Group stated that the rebels increased their firepower with heavy arms, unmanned aerial vehicles, and "suicide vehicles".

On 27 July, the CSP claimed victory in the battle, saying that it defeated and "annihilated" another Malian battalion supported by Wagner mercenaries, and the few survivors fled or surrendered and were taken prisoner. The Wagner Group made a statement saying that only three of its mercenaries remained and continued fighting. Malian equipment and weapons were also seized by the rebels, who acknowledged that seven of their fighters were killed and another 12 were injured.

On the same day, JNIM conducted an ambush on a convoy carrying Malian and Wagner mercenaries who attempted to retreat from the commune near the Tin-Gamira mountains. According to security sources, CSP forces also partook in the ambush. This ambush by JNIM was commanded by Sidane Ag Hita, a senior commander within the group, and Abderahmane Zaza, the JNIM commander for the Tin-Essako Cercle. A spokesperson for the rebel group said that CSP fighters took control of the commune and territory further south in Kidal Region.

=== Ukrainian involvement ===
On 29 July, the Kyiv Post reported that the rebels displayed a Ukrainian flag in a picture after defeating the Wagner Group in the commune, indicating their support for Ukraine. However BBC Verify debunked the report, saying that the picture was taken from a video from June, where no Ukrainian flag was shown. The Main Directorate of Intelligence of Ukraine said that it gave the rebels information and further assistance that enabled their victory against the "Russian war criminals" in the battle. However, CSP Colonel Hamad-Rhissa denied any Ukrainian help or intervention.

== Casualties ==
The number of Russians killed in the battle is unclear. The Wagner Group confirmed that it suffered heavy losses during the fighting, but did not give an exact death toll. It confirmed that commander Sergei Shevchenko was killed in combat. FAMa also confirmed that it suffered "significant losses", without providing a number, and said that it was conducting an analysis to "learn all the necessary lessons". A former United Nations employee in Kidal said that at least 15 Wagner mercenaries were killed or captured during the battle.It became the deadliest battle during the Russian intervention in Mali war

According to Baza, a news channel on Telegram with links to Russian security forces, at least 20 Russians were killed, while the far-right and neo-Nazi paramilitary Rusich Group, which has links to the Wagner Group, said on Telegram that 80 mercenaries were killed and at least 15 were captured. A former Wagner Group mercenary told BBC News Russian that at least 82 Russians died in the battle.

Russian sources confirmed that Nikita Fedyanin was among the dead and uploaded photos purportedly of his body on social media. He was an administrator of the Wagner-linked Grey Zone Telegram channel, which has over 500,000 subscribers. Some Russian Telegram channels reported the death of Anton Yelizarov, a commander who led Wagner operations in Soledar and Bakhmut during the Russian invasion of Ukraine. A Russian war correspondent said that he was captured by the rebels and exchanged, however his actual fate is unknown.

A Tuareg commander said that 54 Wagner mercenaries and seven Malian soldiers were killed. On 2 August, CSP said that 84 Wagner mercenaries and 47 Malian soldiers were killed in the battle, while 30 other troops, either dead or seriously injured, were evacuated by aircraft to Kidal, while losing nine of its own men. In addition, it captured seven mercenaries and Malian soldiers. JNIM claimed that 50 mercenaries and 10 Malian soldiers were killed in their ambush on 27 July, after they attacked a convoy with powerful improvised explosive devices.

Visually confirmed losses include at least six MRAPs (one OTT Puma M26, four Norinco CS/VP-11 and one Streitgroup Typhoon), one helicopter (Mi-24), and 14 trucks (nine Kia KM450, one Sinotruk Howo, one Sinotruk Howo Tanker, two Toyota Landcruiser 79 and one unknown vehicle).

== Aftermath ==
=== Impact on the Wagner Group ===
The Institute for the Study of War cited Russian military bloggers who wrote that the Russian Ministry of Defense "gloated" over Wagner's losses in Mali and suggested that Russia would use the defeat to justify ending the deployment of mercenaries to the Sahel region and replace them with units of its Africa Corps. On 1 August, Russian foreign minister Sergey Lavrov pledged to continue economically and militarily supporting Mali's junta, without mentioning the events that occurred during the battle.

=== Retaliatory attacks ===
On 31 July, Mali and Burkina Faso carried out joint airstrikes in the area of Tinzaouaten. FAMa said that the airstrikes targeted "a coalition of terrorists" and important targets such as caches, logistical positions and vehicles, while urging civilians to stay away. CSP meanwhile condemned the strikes and said that the Burkinabe drone attack killed over 50 migrant workers at gold mines who came from Chad, Niger, and Sudan.

On 25 August, drone strikes hit buildings in parts of the commune, including a house and pharmacy. The attacks killed 21 people, including 11 children, injured dozens of others, and caused severe damage.

=== Diplomatic fallout ===
On 4 August, Mali broke off diplomatic relations with Ukraine with immediate effect, after a senior Ukrainian official, according to Bamako, admitted Kyiv's "involvement" in this attack. Ukraine denied involvement in the attack and condemned the severance, calling the decision "short-sighted and hasty".

In response, Sweden canceled their humanitarian aid package to Mali, stating that "You can't support Russia's illegal war of aggression against Ukraine and at the same time receive several hundred million kronor each year in development aid." In response, Mali broke off comertial relations with Sweden and expelled their ambassador Kristina Kühnel. On 6 August, Niger also broke off diplomatic relations with Ukraine and accused them of supporting terrorist groups.

The Foreign Ministry of Senegal summoned Ukrainian ambassador Yurii Pyvovarov over a video he allegedly posted on the Ukrainian embassy's Facebook page in which he supported the "terrorist attack" in Mali. The Economic Community of West African States (ECOWAS) declared its "firm disapproval and firm condemnation of any outside interference in the region which could constitute a threat to peace and security in West Africa and any attempt aiming to draw the region into current geopolitical confrontations". ECOWAS expressed concern towards the deteriorating situation in Mali following the battle and condemned the ambush.

On 31 August 2024, Mali denounced Algeria to the UN and accused it of spreading "terrorist propaganda" after Algerian representative to the UN Ammar Benjamaa urged international accountability for the perpetrators of a drone strike in Tinzaouaten that killed 20 civilians.

== See also ==
- Islamist insurgency in the Sahel
- Wagner Group activities in Mali
- Battle of Bourem
- Labbezanga attack
