= Andéramboukane Cercle =

Andéramboukane
- Cercle
- Country: Mali
- Region: Ménaka
- Control: Islamic State in the Greater Sahara
- Time zone: UTC+0 (GMT)

Andéramboukane is a cercle of Ménaka Region, Mali.
