= Battle of Tessit =

- Part of the 2012 Tuareg rebellion
- Battle of Tessit (Mali)
Date	24 February 2012
Location	Tessit, Mali
Result	MNLA victory

Belligerents
Mali: Malian Army	Azawad: MNLA

Commanders and leaders
(Mali) Ahmadou Ag Badi	(Azawad) unknown

Casualties and losses
Unknown	Unknown

The MLNA separatists ambushed a convoy defended by Malian soldiers and Tuareg militia commanded by captain Ahmadou Ag Badi. The latter fled after an hour of fighting. Another MNLA mobile unit then began chasing them about 50 kilometers to the outskirts of the town of In Tillit. The MNLA said it ignored the Malian losses because of the large extent of the scene of the fighting, however, it considers that the latter have suffered loss of life and material and also stated that it had no loss in its ranks.
