= Ménaka Airport =

Airport in Mali

Ménaka Airport Aéroport de Ménaka
- IATA: none; ICAO: GAMK

Summary
- Airport type: Public
- Serves: Ménaka, Mali
- Elevation AMSL: 899 ft / 274 m
- Coordinates: 15°55′45″N 002°20′50″E

Map
- Location of Ménaka Airport in Mali

Runways
Direction	Length		Surface
Direction	ft	m	Surface
08/26	4,020	1,225	Dirt

Ménaka Airport (ICAO: GAMK) (French: Aéroport de Ménaka) is an airport serving Ménaka, a town and commune in the Ménaka Cercle in the Gao Region of Mali. The airport is 5 kilometres (3 mi) west of the city.
