= Labbezanga attack =

2023 battle in Labbézanga, Mali

- Part of Mali War
Date	December 3, 2023
Location	Ménaka Region and Labbézanga, Mali
Result	ISSP victory

Belligerents
Mali; Wagner Group	Islamic State – Sahil Province; Supported by: Ukraine (accused by Russia)

Casualties and losses
30–40 Malian soldiers killed (per RFI)	Several dozen killed, 20 arrested (per Mali, denied by RFI)

On December 3, 2023, jihadists from the Islamic State – Sahil Province (ISSP) launched simultaneous attacks against Malian forces and allied Wagner Group mercenaries in Labbézanga, Gao Region, and against Tuareg militia groups in Ménaka Region.

== Background ==
Labbezanga is a small town on the border between Mali and Niger, deep in territory controlled by the jihadist groups Jama'at Nasr al-Islam wal Muslimin (JNIM) and the Islamic State – Sahil Province (ISSP). The Malian military camp has been the target of many jihadist attacks, including one in July 2023 that injured a civilian. In early 2023, the Malian junta that took power in 2021 demanded the evacuation of MINUSMA by the end of the year. Around this same time, the Malian Army began cooperating with the Russian Wagner Group after the junta kicked the French of Operation Barkhane out a year prior.

The Malian camp at Labbezanga was built in 2020 by French troops of Barkhane in a Vauban style. When it was first built, Le Figaro called the fortress "impregnable."

== Attack ==
Two attacks were launched by ISGS on December 3; one in Ménaka and one in Labbezanga. The attack in Menaka targeted the pro-government Movement for the Salvation of Azawad (MSA) and GATIA militias, and briefly ended after an hour of fighting. ISSP attacked the Malian fort at Labbezanga while fighting at Menaka raged, with the Menaka attack intended to divert Malian attention and forces away from Labbezanga. ISSP fighters seized weapons, ammunition, and fuel, and torched the camp before abandoning it.

Malian officials stated in a report that night that several dozen jihadists were killed and twenty were captured across both attacks, but these reports were unverifiable. In later reports, the Malian army stated it had conducted air and land counteroffensives against the group. RFI stated that between thirty and forty Malian soldiers were killed in the attack. The Malian junta denied the capture of the camp, but photos released by the Islamic State's Amaq News Agency showed the fighters capturing the base. The raid was likely the first confrontation between Wagner mercenaries and ISSP fighters since the mercenaries arrived in Mali earlier that year.

After the attack subsided, Nigerien soldiers from across the border visited the base to aid Malian soldiers.

== Aftermath ==
On December 23, 2023, Malian colonel Ibrahim Samassa visited the camp at Labbezanga, which was repopulated by Malian soldiers led by Souleymane Dembele. Samassa congratulated the soldiers in defending the base after the attack on December 3. Malian counteroffensive operations were called Operation Moniko, and lasted from December 3 to January 25, 2024. Malian officials claimed that Operation Moniko killed sixty-five jihadists and arrested forty-two others.
