= Alata, Mali =

Alata
- Commune
- Location in Mali
- Coordinates: 16°56′58″N 2°39′36″E
- Country: Mali
- Region: Ménaka
- Cercle: Tidermène
- Created: 2001

Population (2009 census)
  - Total: 2,184
- Time zone: UTC+0 (GMT)

Alata is a rural commune in the cercle of Tidermène in Ménaka Region of southeastern Mali. The administrative centre (chef-lieu) is at Tedjerit. The commune was created in 2001 by dividing the large rural commune of Tidermène. The implementation of Ménaka Region in 2016 led to the promotion of Tidermène to a cercle, and Alata was reincorporated into it. As of 2017 the mayor is Frataye Ag Etaw.
