= Tidermène =

- Cercle and village
- Location in Mali
- Coordinates: 16°35′37″N 2°24′53″E
- Country: Mali
- Region: Ménaka
- Control: Islamic State in the Greater Sahara (Since April 12 2023)

Population (2009 census)
  - Total: 5,816
- Time zone: UTC+0 (GMT)

Tidermène is a village and cercle in Ménaka Region of southeastern Mali. In the 2009 census it had a population of 5,816. Its area is approximately 29,000 square kilometers. It was previously a commune in Ménaka Cercle but was promoted to the status of a cercle when Ménaka Region was created in 2016. From 2001 to 2016 the commune of Alata was separated from Tidermène. On 12 April 2023, the town was seized by the Islamic State in the Sahel.
