= Mali–Ukraine relations =

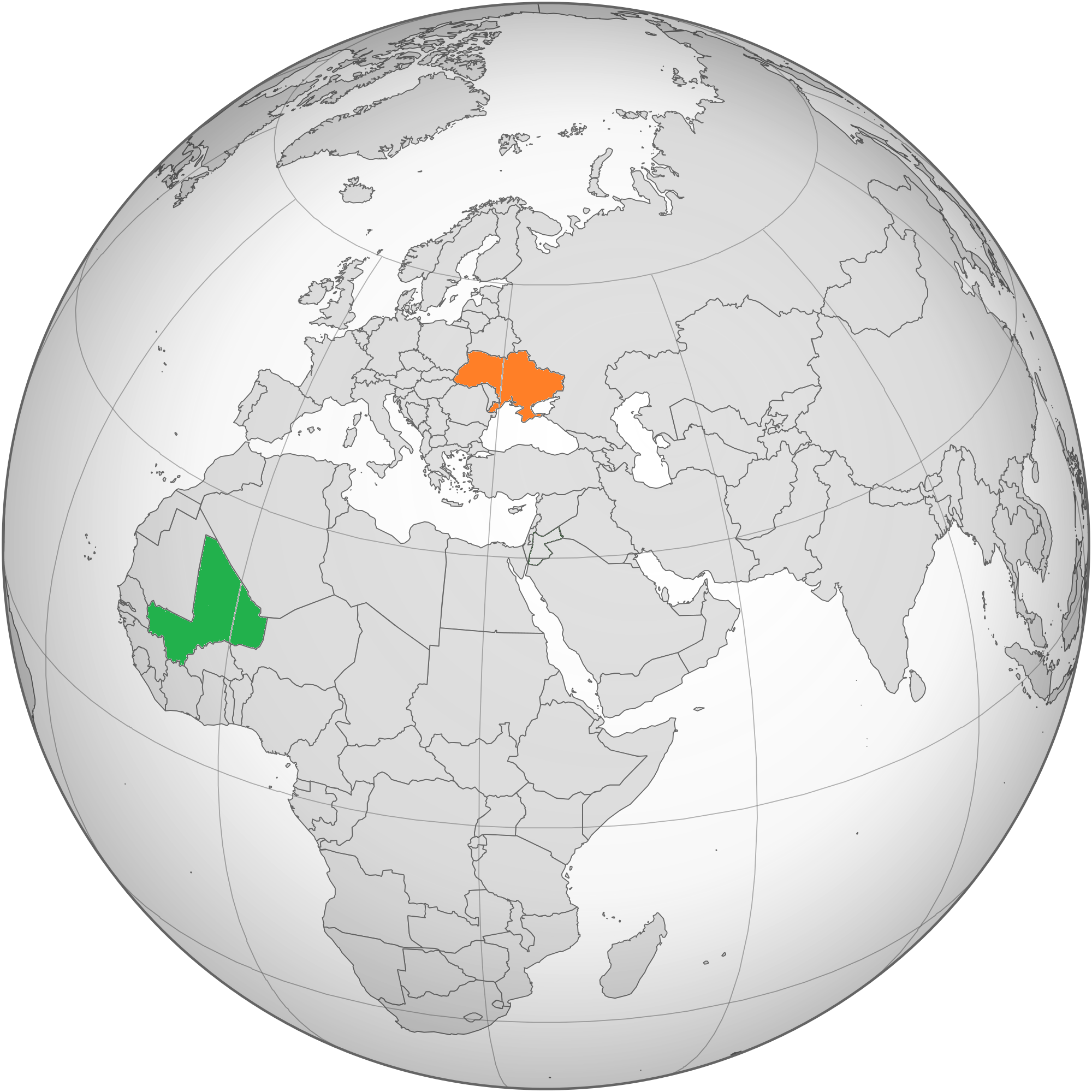
- Mali: Ukraine

Mali–Ukraine relations are the bilateral relations between Mali and Ukraine. They have remained hostile after the government of Mali decided to cut diplomatic ties with Ukraine, claiming that the country provided intelligence to Tuareg rebels.

== History ==
On January 5, 1992, Mali officially recognized Ukrainian independence, and later established diplomatic relations on November 5, 1992.

The interests of Ukrainian citizens in the Republic of Mali are protected by the Ukrainian Embassy in Algiers.

In 2023, the interim president of Mali, Assimi Goïta, expressed support for Putin following the Russian invasion of Ukraine.

On August 4, 2024, Mali severed diplomatic relations with Ukraine after a senior Ukrainian official supposedly admitted Kyiv's "involvement" in the Battle of Tinzaouaten, where the Malian Armed Forces and Russia's Wagner Group suffered heavy defeat. In response, the Ukrainian government called this decision "short-sighted and hasty", while pointing out the "terrorist methods" of the Wagner Group in Mali.

== Economic ==
In January 2022, Ukrainian exports to Mali were valued at $1.3 million USD, which has risen to $1.59 million by 2023. The main export products include hot and cold-rolled iron bars, poultry meat, and beer.

Conversely, Malian exports to Ukraine were valued at $4.47 million USD in 2023, with the main products being gas turbines, aircraft parts, and transmissions.
