= Battle of Tinzaouaten (2012) =

- Part of the Tuareg rebellion (2012)
Date	7–8 February 2012
Location	Tinzaouaten, Mali 19°57′45″N 2°51′27″E
Result	MNLA victory
Territorial changes	Tinzaouaten captured from the Malian Army

Belligerents
Mali: Malian Army	Azawad: MNLA; Ansar Dine

Strength
50	Unknown

Casualties and losses
1 killed 10 captured 37 defected	1 killed
- Location within Mali

On 8 February 2012, rebel forces from the separatist National Movement for the Liberation of Azawad (MNLA) attacked a military outpost in Tinzaouaten located near the Algeria–Mali border. The battle led to the capture of the commune by MNLA rebels. A Malian government statement was released the following day declaring a "strategic retreat" from its base in Tinzaouaten. A Malian soldier was killed. Ten were captured and 37 defected and were retrieved by Algerian authorities.

== Battle ==
On 7 February 2012, the commune of Tinzaouaten was attacked by the rebels. Malian forces managed to repel the initial attack after several hours of combat, but the commune was captured by the rebels the next day. According to MNLA spokesman Hama Ag Sid'Ahmed, the separatists took control of two military camps in the commune and took several military vehicles. The Malian Army withdrew the garrison to Algeria, but denied defeat by referring to the move as a "strategic retreat". On 20 March, Ansar Dine also claimed to have control of Tinzaouaten.

== Aftermath ==
According to the report released by the MNLA, more than 34 Malian soldiers fled to Algeria, 5 were wounded, 10 taken prisoner (including an officer), against a single wounded soldier on their side. The separatists also claimed to have captured several vehicles. Spokesman Hama Ag Sid'Ahmed, however, mentions both dead and injured in the ranks of the MNLA. According to an unnamed official Malian source, there was no fighting or loss of life as the army decided to abandon the isolated positions for tactical reasons. However, according to Reuters, the Malian government indicates in a statement on 8 February that one soldier was killed and two others wounded.
