= Inékar =

- Cercle and village
- Location in Mali
- Coordinates: 15°56′57″N 3°9′33″E
- Country: Mali
- Region: Ménaka
- Control: Islamic State in the Greater Sahara

Area
  - Total: 27,000 km^{2} (10,000 sq mi)

Population (2009 census)
  - Total: 8,714
  - Density: 0.32/km^{2} (0.84/sq mi)
- Time zone: UTC+0 (GMT)

Inékar is a village and cercle of Ménaka Region in southeastern Mali. It has an area of approximately 27,000 square kilometers and in 2009 had a population of 8,714. It was previously a commune in Ménaka Cercle but was promoted to the status of a cercle when Ménaka Region was implemented in 2016.
