= Mali–Niger border =

International border

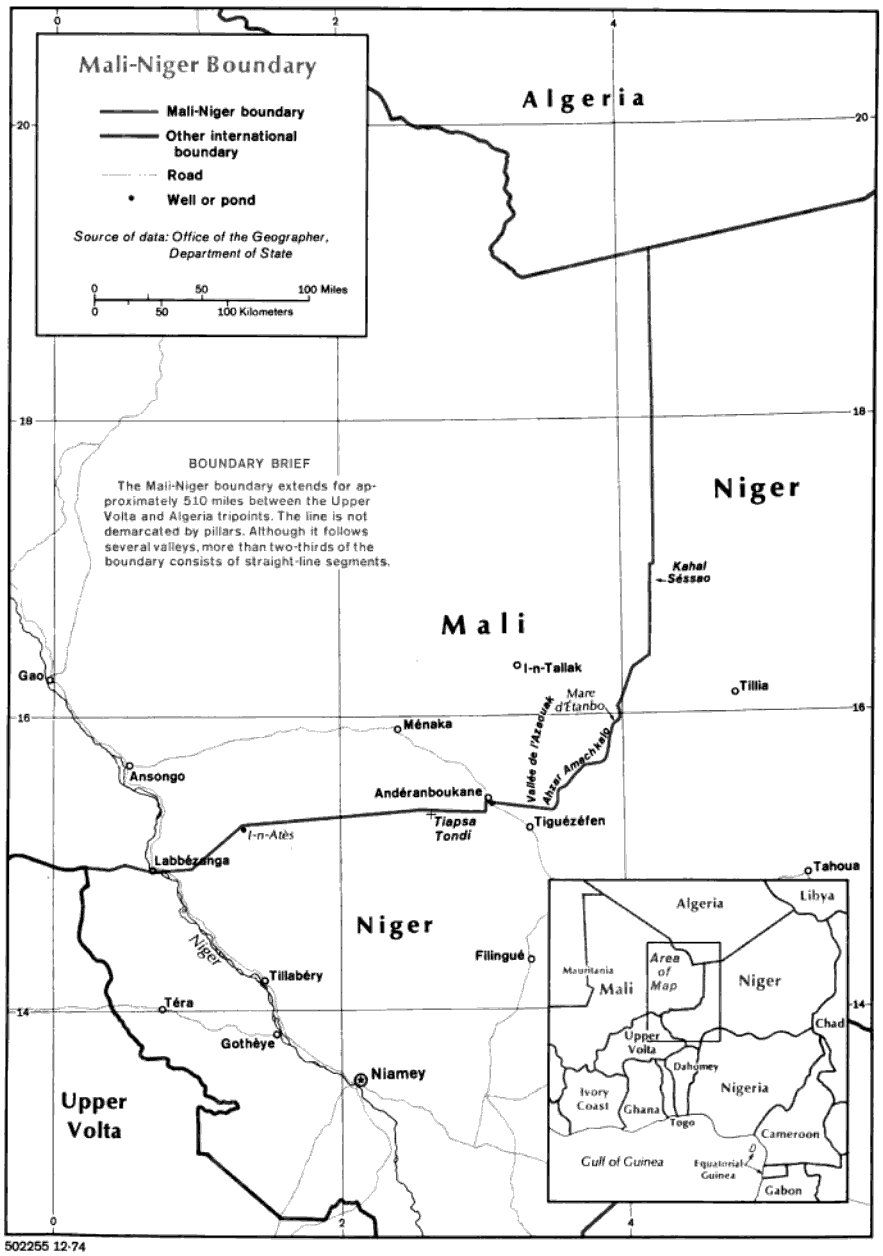
Map of the Mali-Niger border

The Mali–Niger border is 828 km (520 mi) in length and runs from the tripoint with Burkina Faso in the west to the tripoint with Algeria in the east.

== Description ==
Beginning at the tripoint with Burkina Faso, the border proceeds in an irregular line eastwards, cutting across the Niger River, with a series of straight lines proceeding eastwards to a point just north of the Mata Lekya well in Niger. The boundary then follows the seasonal Ahzar Amachkalo river in a steep north-eastwards direction, then continues in this manner via a series of straight lines in an almost directly northwards direction up to the Algerian tripoint. The terrain is generally Sahelian, merging into the Sahara desert in the northern stretches.

== History ==
The border first emerged during the Scramble for Africa, a period of intense competition between European powers in the later 19th century for territory and influence in Africa. The process culminated in the Berlin Conference of 1884, in which the European nations concerned agreed upon their respective territorial claims and the rules of engagements going forward. As a result of this France gained control of the upper valley of the Niger River (roughly equivalent to the areas of modern Mali and Niger). France began occupying the area of modern Mali (then often referred to as French Sudan) during the 1880s–90s, later occupying the territory of modern Niger by 1900. These areas fell under the control of the federal colony of French West Africa (Afrique occidentale française, abbreviated AOF). The internal divisions of this polity underwent several changes during its existence; what are now Mali, Niger and Burkina Faso were at first united as Upper Senegal and Niger, with Niger being classed as a military territory, ruled from Zinder. What is now the Mali–Niger border was initially delimited by the Commanders of Gao and Niamey on 26 August 1909. It appears that for about a year from 1910 to 1911 the town of Gao was included within Niger. The Niger military territory was split off from Upper Senegal and Niger in 1911, becoming a separate colony in 1922. The Mali-Niger boundary was further delimited in 1928–29 and 1937–38, being finalised at a convention in Niamey on 3 April 1939.

As the movement for decolonisation grew in the post-Second World War era, France gradually granted more political rights and representation for its African territories, culminating in the granting of broad internal autonomy to each colony in 1958 within the framework of the French Community. Eventually, in August 1960, both Mali (at that point part of the short-lived Federation of Mali with Senegal) and Niger were granted full independence and their mutual frontier became an international one between two independent states. A joint protocol between the two new states on 27 February 1962 confirmed their mutual boundary as per the 1939 convention. Security along the boundary has been poor for many years, owing to the Tuareg rebellions of the 1990s and 2000s. This worsened considerably after 2012, following the outbreak of the Northern Mali conflict and associated Islamist-inspired violence.

== Settlements ==
=== Mali ===
- Labbézanga
- Ouattagouna
- Akabar
- Tabonkort
- Andéramboukane

=== Niger ===
- Ayourou
- Bani-Bangou
- Chinagodrar
- Andéramboukane

== Border crossings ==
There is a road crossing in the far west of the border connecting Ansongo (Mali) to Ayourou (Niger). Further east lies the border crossing at Andéramboukane (Mali). The border can also be traversed via boat along the river Niger. Travel to the border region is discouraged by third party governments owing to the high incidence of kidnap and criminality, and the ongoing instability resulting from the Tuareg rebellions and the insurgency in Mali.

== See also ==
- Mali–Niger relations
