= Mohamed Ag Najem =

Azawadi colonel

Head of Military Operations of MNLA
- Incumbent
- Assumed office 15 October 2011

Military service
- Allegiance: Libyan Arab Jamahiriya; MNLA
- Rank: Colonel

Mohamed Ag Najem (alias Ag Mohamed Najem, alternatively spelled Mahamed Ag Najim) is an Azawadi colonel, who is the chief of staff of the National Movement for the Liberation of Azawad (MNLA) army.

== Biography ==
He is thought to be born at the end of the 1950s in the Adrar des Ifoghas massif. His father of the Kel Adagh tribe was killed by the Malian army in the 1963 Tuareg rebellion at a time where he was a young child. At 20 years old he was recruited as a volunteer in the Libyan army under Gaddafi. He served in Libya and in Chad before returning to Mali to take part in the 1990 Tuareg rebellion led by Iyad Ag Ghaly. He then returned to Libya, rejecting the peace agreement signed between the Malian government and the Tuareg rebels. He became a colonel in the Libyan army and was put in charge of an elite unit in the city of Sabha. The civil war in Libya prompted his return to his homeland.

At the end of 2011, he federated his former fellow Libyan soldiers, three local Tuareg clans and Tuareg deserters of the Malian Army to become the military leader of the MNLA army.
