= Andéramboukane =

- Cercle and town
- Location in Mali
- Coordinates: 15°25′42″N 3°1′6″E
- Country: Mali (de jure); Islamic State (de facto)
- Region: Ménaka
- Control: Islamic State - Sahel Province

Area
  - Total: 6,684 km^{2} (2,581 sq mi)

Population (2009 census)
  - Total: 18,688
  - Density: 2.796/km^{2} (7.241/sq mi)
- Time zone: UTC+0 (GMT)
  - Summer (DST): UTC+0 (not observed)

Andéramboukane (var. Andéramboucane) is a town and cercle in Ménaka Region, Mali. It lies at the extreme east of the country, several kilometers north of the Nigerien border. It was previously a commune in Ménaka Cercle but was promoted to the status of a cercle when Ménaka Region was implemented in 2016. Anderamboukane has been the capital of the Islamic State - Sahel Province since its capture by the group in 2022.

Andéramboukane is a rural, isolated, and largely desert area, crisscrossed by seasonal wadis, part of an ancient dry river system of the Azawagh region (the Iullemmeden Basin). The area is just south of the rocky outcrops of the Ader Douchi hills, and north of the Sahel scrubland which begins in Niger. Most of the population of the area are nomadic Tuareg or other nomadic minorities, including the Wodaabe Fula. The sedentary population is a largely low caste Tuareg community. The town is a seasonal gathering point for the Kel Dinnik Tuareg confederation, who travel from the desert Azawagh in the rainy season and the Niger River valley in the dry season. Since the 1990s, the town has hosted a formalised version of the traditional fairs that take place at beginning of the southward transhumance cycle. This festival, named Tamadacht, has become a showcase of traditional and contemporary Tuareg and Wodaabe music, dance, sport, performance, and arts.

== Lawlessness ==
The area around Andéramboukane has a reputation for lawlessness. Since the 1990s, there have been conflicts between Nigerien Fula and Malian Tuareg cattle herders in the area, and the theft of animals has been a regular occurrence. In addition, the vast empty border region is used as a route to smuggle drugs, alcohol, weapons and illegal migrants from tropical Africa to the Mediterranean.

Andéramboukane was a center of Ag El Insar Firhoun's Malian rising in the larger 1916 Tuareg Rebellion, after Firhoun's rebels fled the French colonial forces from their homes near Goundam in the Timbuktu area. The region was controlled by rebel forces during the 1961–1964, 1990–1995, 2007–2009, and the 2012 Tuareg Rebellions.

=== 2009 kidnapping ===
On 22 January 2009, four foreign tourists were kidnapped in Ménaka Cercle, while traveling by car from a festival at Andéramboukane on the main road to Ménaka, and on to Gao. One Briton, one German, and two Swiss citizens were reportedly kidnapped. One of their vehicles escaped the attack, and one which was seized was later found abandoned across the border near Bani-Bangou, Niger.

On 1 June, an Al-Qaeda website claimed that the Briton, Edwin Dyer, had been killed following demands for the release of the radical Muslim cleric Abu Qatada from a British jail.
