= Meñaka =

Coordinates: 43°21′52″N 2°48′6″W

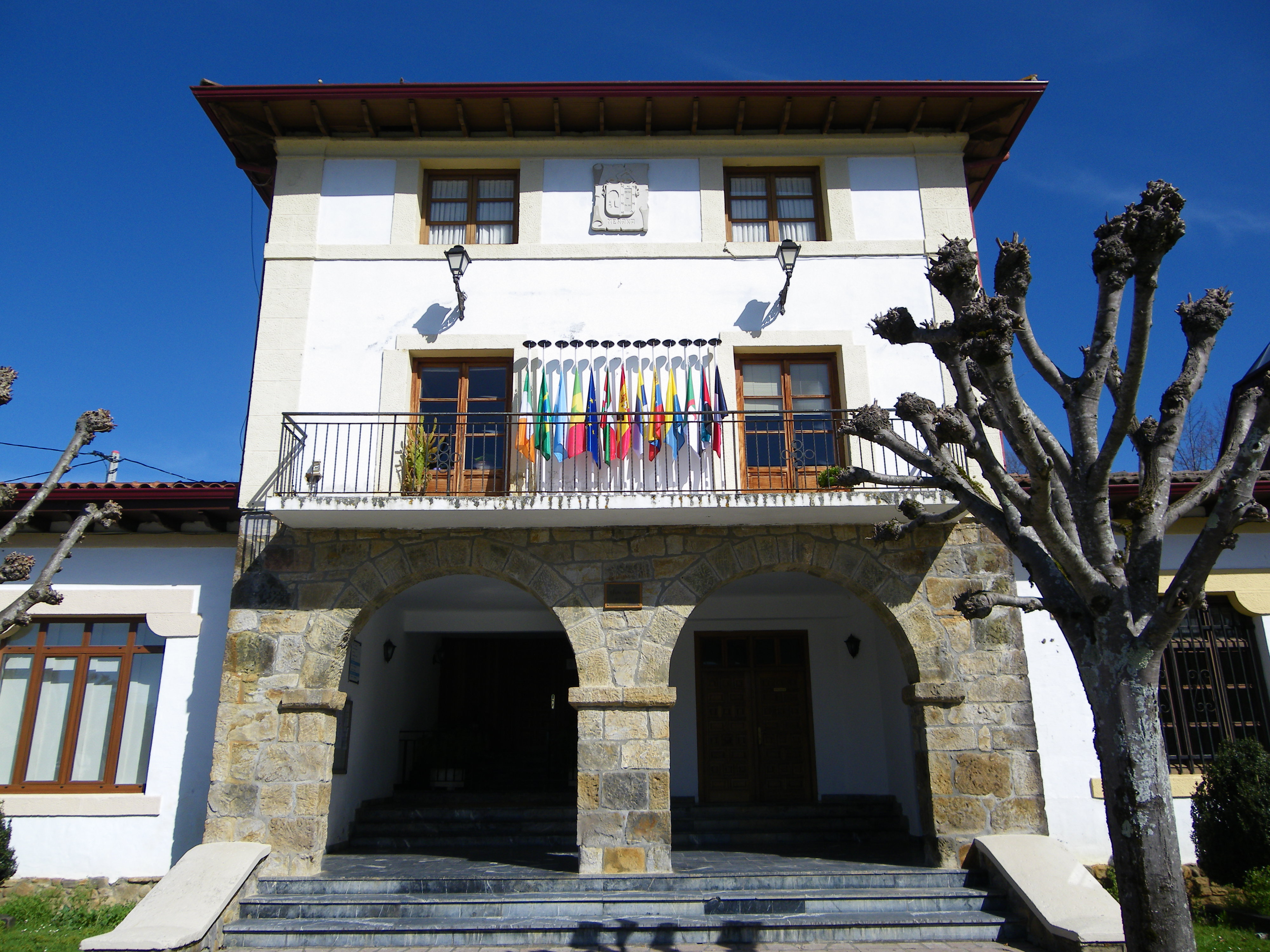
- Town hall

- Flag Coat of arms

- Location in Spain.
- Country: Spain
- Autonomous community: Biscay

Area
  - Total: 12.70 km^{2} (4.90 sq mi)
- Elevation: 154 m (505 ft)

Population (2025-01-01)
  - Total: 789
  - Density: 62.1/km^{2} (161/sq mi)
- Time zone: UTC+1 (CET)
  - Summer (DST): UTC+2 (CEST)
- Website: www.menaka.eus

Meñaka is a town and municipality located in the province of Biscay, in the autonomous community of Basque Country, northern Spain.
