= Idaksahak people =

Dawsahak
- People: Idaksahak
- Language: Tadáksahak

The Dawsahak people, Idaksahak (var.: Daoussahak, Dahoussahak, Dausahaq, Daosahaq, Daoussahaq, Daoussak, Dawsahaq) are pastoralist Berbers centered on Ménaka and Inékar town in Ménaka Region and Talataye in Ansongo Cercle of the Gao Region of northeastern Mali. They speak the Northern Songhai language Tadaksahak. Many also speak Western Tawallammat Tamajaq language, the Tuareg language of southern Gao. Daoussahak appears to be the most common transliteration of the collective name among French and English academics.

== History ==
The Idaksahak are a former dependent faction of local Tuareg Iwellemmeden, formerly serving as maraboutic (religious experts) and livestock minders for higher caste Tuareg factions. Despite this history, they predated the Tuareg in the region, and even the Songhay Empire, from which they took their language. They are still sometimes referred to as a tewsit (clan) of the Iwellemmeden Tuareg. The Idaksahak, like the related Igdalan "were among the first Berbers to migrate to sub-Saharan Africa, sometime between the 8th and 9th centuries" and were among the first Muslim groups in the area.

The Daoussahak remained detached from, and sometimes in conflict with, French colonial rule as late as the 1950s. They were among the first of the rebels who rose against the Malian government in the 1963-64 rebellion, an insurgency which was met with brutal suppression across the north of the country. Daoussahak men also formed armed groups during the 1990s rebellion. The Popular Liberation Front of Azawad(1991-1993) and the later splinter group the National Liberation Front of Azawad (1993) contained fighters drawn from the Daoussahak, the later being majority Daoussahak.

Daoussahak livestock raiding and conflict with rival Fula pastoralists and farmers continues today, with occasional armed conflict over land, grazing, water, and animals periodically spilling over into the Ouallam Department of Niger.

== Pastoralism ==
They now include both sedentary pastoralists and town dwellers, as well as seasonally nomadic pastoralists, herding cattle, goats, and camels from Mali through southern Algeria and northwest Niger. Transhumance patterns continue to take them northeast into the area of Niger inhabited by the Igdalen related Isawaghan: sedentary Northern Songhay speakers of Ingal Niger. The Idaksahak also have a history of transhumance patterns to the southeast, taking them into what is now the Ouallam area of Niger.

== Demography, religion, and society ==
In 2001, the Malian population of Idaksahak was estimated at 30,000. Idaksahak share with Tuareg a three part caste system of "free masters" (i-dáksahak), "craftspeople" (ʒeem-án) and the "captives/slaves" (ṭaam-én). One study suggested that of North Songhay speaking communities, the Idaksahak are closest to Tuareg. While culturally similar, Igdalan do not intermarry with Tuareg, while Idaksahak intermarry with both communities.

The name i-dáksahak means "sons of Isaac". The Idaksahak are Muslim, although many maintain pre-Islamic beliefs and practices. In Menaka and Ansongo, the Idaksahak live amongst populations of the Igdalan, the Kel Essouk Tuareg, Ihatan Songhay, and Berberiche Arab factions.

== See also ==
- Tadaksahak language
- Tuareg
