= Ménaka Cercle =

Ménaka
- Cercle
- Ménaka Cercle in Mali

- Location within Mali Location within Africa
- Coordinates: 16°35′N 2°50′E
- Country: Mali
- Region: Ménaka
- Admin HQ (Chef-lieu): Ménaka

Area
  - Total: 14,900 km^{2} (5,800 sq mi)

Population (2009 Census)
  - Total: 20,702
  - Density: 1.39/km^{2} (3.60/sq mi)
- Time zone: UTC+0 (GMT)

Ménaka Cercle is an administrative subdivision of Ménaka Region, Mali. Its administrative center is the town of Ménaka. Ménaka Cercle's population as of 2009 was 56,104 people. Ménaka is located in the middle of the Sahara Desert, along Wadi Ezgeuret and an ancient dry river valley of the Iullemmeden Basin. Its highest point, Mount Abourak, is located around 150 km to the north of the town of Ménaka. Most of the small population are nomadic Tuareg tribal populations; minorities include the Wodaabe Fula and sedentary Songhai people. The area is a traditional center of the Kel Dinnik Tuareg confederation, along with the town of Andéramboukane near the Nigerien border.

== History ==
The current Ménaka Cercle is the successor to a previous commune of the same name. Prior to 2016, a different Ménaka Cercle existed corresponding to the current Ménaka Region. It was divided into five communes:

- Alata
- Andéramboukane
- Inékar
- Ménaka
- Tidermène

=== 2009 kidnappings ===
On 22 January, four foreign tourists were reported kidnapped in Ménaka Cercle, while traveling by auto from a festival at Anderamboukané on the main road to Ménaka, and on to Gao. One Briton, one German, and two Swiss citizens were reportedly kidnapped. One of their vehicles escaped the attack, and one which was seized was later found abandoned across the border near Bani-Bangou, Niger. The German and one of the Swiss citizens were released in April 2009. The Briton was killed in May 2009. The other Swiss citizen was released in July 2009.

On 25 November, a Frenchman called Pierre Camatte was taken hostage from a hotel in Ménaka city. A January 2010 statement issued by the north African branch of al-Qaeda, sets an ultimatum of 20 days for the exchange of four of al-Qaeda members by Pierre Camatte, after which, it says, the French and Malian governments "will be fully responsible for the French hostage's life". Camatte was released in exchange for the four prisoners in February 2010.
