= Omar Ould Hamaha =

Islamist militia commander (1965–2014)

- Oumar Ould Hamaha
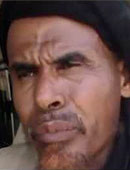
- Born: 5 July 1963; Kidal, Mali
- Died: 8 March 2014 (aged 50); Northeastern Mali
- Other name: Hakka
- Military career
- Allegiance: Islamist
- Branch: Militia
- Conflicts: Mali war Operation Serval: Battle of Konna

Omar Ould Hamaha (or Oumar Ould Hamaha, Hakka; 5 July 1963 – March 8, 2014) was an Islamist militia commander from Northern Mali. During the 2012 Northern Mali conflict he became known alternatively as the spokesman and chief of staff for both Ansar Dine and Movement for Oneness and Jihad in West Africa (MOJWA), militant groups associated with Al-Qaeda in the Islamic Maghreb (AQIM).

Ould Hamaha was born in Kidal, Mali. He was the son of a military camel driver and member of the Arab ethnicity. In 1984, he graduated from the Franco-Arabic lycée in Timbuktu. Instead of going to university, he opted to study the Koran at a Mauritanian madrasa. Returned to Timbuktu in 1990, he was refused preaching licence at the Grand Mosque. After his brother, who was a fighter of the Arab Islamic Front of Azawad, was killed by the Malian army during the Tuareg rebellion of the early 1990s, Ould Hamaha went underground. Influenced by Pakistani preachers, he embraced Salafist teachings.

In the mid-2000s, he joined Al-Qaeda in the Islamic Maghreb (AQIM) and became the deputy to Mokhtar Belmokhtar, an emir of AQIM's Sahelian Brigade. At some point during Belmokhtar and Ould Hamaha's relationship it is believed that Belmokhtar married a daughter of Ould Hamaha, further strengthening their relationship. The Canadian diplomat Robert Fowler, who was abducted by AQIM in Niger in 2008, identified Ould Hamaha as one of his kidnappers. After 1 April 2012, he became publicly known as the spokesman of the Islamist militant group Ansar Dine. The MOJWA, in coordination with its allied Militant Islamist groups AQIM and Ansar Dine, took control of Northern Mali from the Battle of Gao in June 2012 until the French Operation Serval in January 2013, which led to the recapture of Northern Mali. Following the capture of Gao, Ould Hamaha became identified as deputy to the MOJWA chief of Gao. In August 2012, he became the chief of staff of MOJWA. Ould Hamaha's actual position in both of these groups was undefined, with one commentator describing him as "a spokesman for the [Islamist] coalition" that ruled Northern Mali.

After France's intervention into Northern Mali in January 2013, Ould Hamaha, along with Mokhtar Belmokhtar, eluded capturing by French and MINUSMA forces. At the end of May 2013, two near simultaneous suicide attacks at a uranium mine and military barracks in Northern Niger were claimed both by MOJWA and Belmokhtar's breakaway organization, Katibat al-Mulathimeen or "The Masked Brigade." Ould Hamaha's relationship with both MOJWA and Belmokhtar is believed to have factored into the joint operation. On 22 August 2013, Mauritania's news agency, ANI, reported that MOJWA and Belmokhtar's brigade had merged to form al-Murabitun, in reference to the 11th Century Almoravid Dynasty of Morocco and Southern Spain.

On 3 June 2013, the US State Department's Rewards for Justice program announced a $3 million bounty for information leading to Ould Hamaha's arrest. The State Department also announced a $5 million bounty for Belmokhtar's arrest. In March 2014, Malian and French military sources reported that Ould Hamaha had been killed in an airstrike carried out by French forces in northeastern Mali. A month later, a spokesman for Al-Mourabitoun denied Hamaha was killed. Despite this denial of Hamaha's death, the Rewards for Justice program removed him from the list in May 2014. AQIM officially confirmed Hamaha's death in February 2016.

Ould Hamaha's nom de guerre was Hakka (French pronunciation of "AK", alluding to his skill at handling the AK-47 assault rifle). He was also known as the "red-bearded" or Barbe Rousse for his henna-dyed goatee beard. Besides Arabic, Ould Hamaha spoke French and Songhay.
