= Ménaka Region =

Region of Mali

Ménaka
- Region
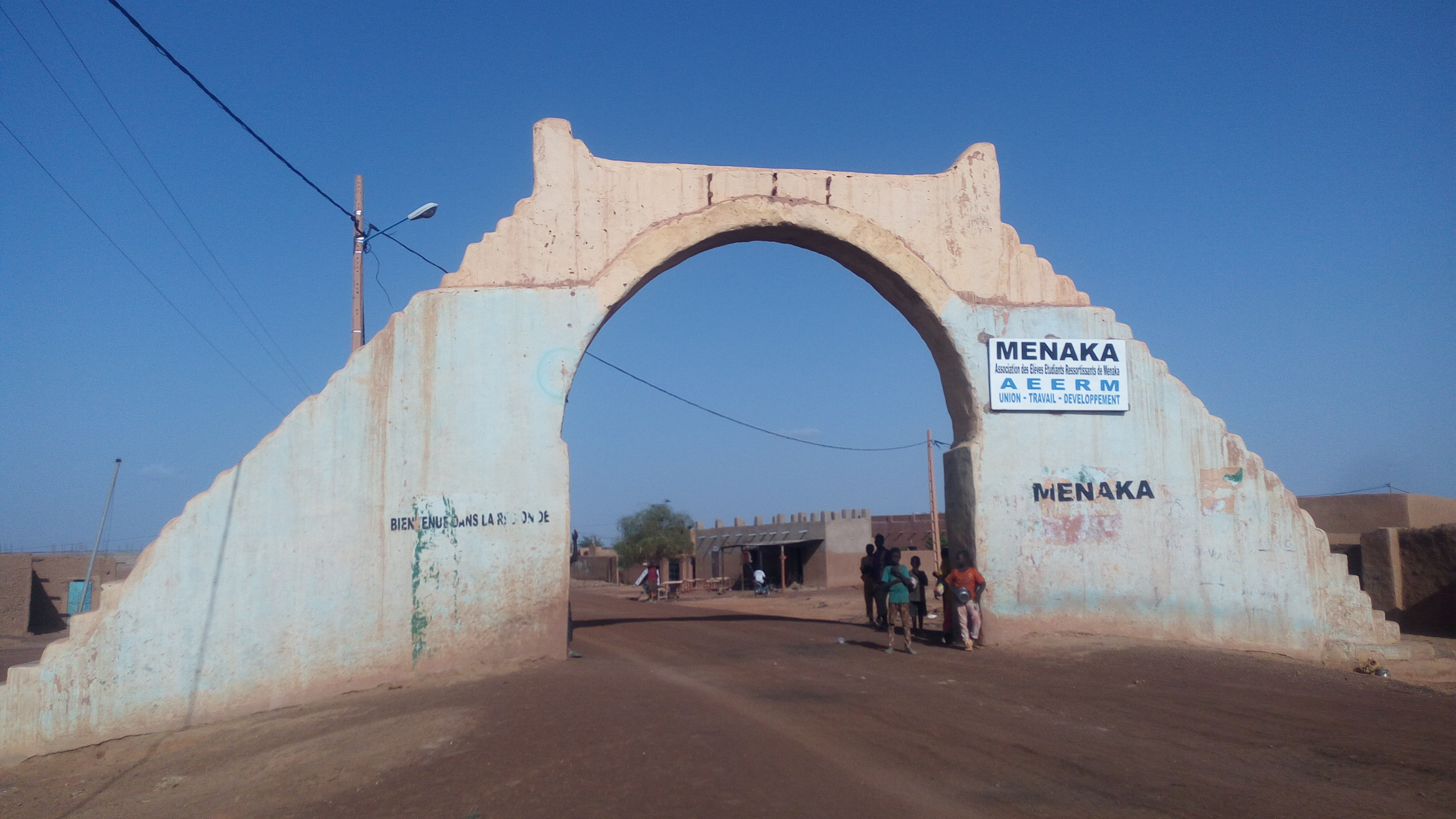
- Entrance to Menaka town

- Location of the former Ménaka Cercle in Mali, corresponding to the current region
- Interactive map of Ménaka Region in Mali
- Coordinates: 16.7°N 2.7°E
- Country: Mali
- Capital: Ménaka

Government
  - Governor: Daouda Maïga

Area
  - Total: 81,040 km^{2} (31,290 sq mi)

Population (2023 estimate)
  - Total: 314,518
  - Density: 3.881/km^{2} (10.05/sq mi)
- Time zone: UTC±0 (UTC)

Ménaka (Bambara: ߡߋߣߊߞߊ ߘߌߣߋߖߊ tr. Menaka Dineja) is a region of Mali legislatively created in 2012 from the cercle of the same name previously part of Gao Region. Actual implementation of the region began on 19 January 2016 with the appointment of Daouda Maïga as the region's governor. Members of the region's transitional council were appointed on 14 October 2016. The region is divided into four cercles: Andéramboukane, Inékar, Tidermène, and Ménaka, the location of the capital, also called Ménaka.

== Demographics ==
The Ménaka Region is the fifth least populated region in Mali, with a population of 318,876 in 2022. With a total fertility rate at 4.1 births per woman, Ménaka has a lower TFR than the Malian national average of 6.1 births per woman.

=== Ethnicity ===
Ethnicity in Ménaka (2022)
1. Tuareg (72.7%)
2. Songhai (4.96%)
3. Arab (2.93%)
4. Bambara (2.86%)
5. Senufo (0.86%)
6. Somono (0.79%)
7. Other (14.9%)
Mother tongues in Menaka region (2022)
1. Tuareg (74.8%)
2. Songhai (4.55%)
3. Bambara (2.94%)
4. Arabic (2.78%)
5. Other Malian (12.6%)
6. Other African (2.10%)
7. Other foreign (0.19%)

Ménaka is one of three Malian regions (the others being Kidal and Tombouctou) where the Tuareg constitute the single largest ethnic group. In 2022, Tuareg people accounted for over 72% of the regional population. Minorities in Ménaka include the Songhai, Arabs (Maure), Bambara, Senufo (mostly Minyanka), and Somono.

=== Religion ===
The 2022 census found that 99.67% of the population in Ménaka was Muslim, 0.30% was Christian, 0.02% were adherents of traditional faiths, and 0.01% practised other religions. Islam is the dominant religion among the Tuareg, who are almost entirely Muslim.
