= National Movement for the Liberation of Azawad =

Militant group in Northern Mali (2011–2024)

- ⵜⴰⵏⴾⵔⴰ ⵏ ⵜⵓⵎⴰⵙⵜ ⴹ ⴰⵙⵍⴰⵍⵓ ⵏ ⴰⵣⴰⵓⴰⴷ الحركة الوطنية لتحرير أزواد; Mouvement national de libération de l'Azawad
- Emblem of the MNLA
- Leaders: Bilal Ag Acherif (General Secretary); Mahmoud Ag Aghaly (President of the political bureau); Mohamed Ag Najem (Head of military operations); Moussa Ag Acharatoumane (2011-2016); Ibrahim Ag Bahanga
- Dates active: October 2011 – November 30, 2024
- Headquarters: Kidal (until 2023)
- Active regions: Northern Mali (former State of Azawad)
- Ideology: Nationalism; Autonomy; Berberism; Secularism
- Size: 9,000–10,000 (in 2012, per MNLA sources); 3,000–4,000 (2023)
- Part of: Coordination of Azawad Movements
- Wars: Tuareg rebellion: Battle of Tessit; Siege of Tessalit; Battle of Tinzaouaten (2012); Battle of Kidal (2012); Fall of Andéramboukane; Battle of In Arab Operation Serval
- Website: www.mnlamov.net

The National Movement for the Liberation of Azawad or the Azawad National Liberation Movement (French: Mouvement national de libération de l'Azawad, MNLA), (Note: Tamasheq: ⵜⴰⵏⴾⵔⴰ ⵏ ⵜⵓⵎⴰⵙⵜ ⴹ ⴰⵙⵍⴰⵍⵓ ⵏ ⴰⵣⴰⵓⴰⴷ, romanized: Tankra n Tumast ḍ Aslalu n Azawad; Arabic: الحركة الوطنية لتحرير أزواد, romanized: al-Ḥarakat al-Waṭaniyat Litaḥrīr ʾĀzawād) formerly the National Movement of Azawad (French: Mouvement national de l'Azawad, MNA), was a militant organization based in northern Mali.

The movement consisted mostly of ethnic Tuareg (a branch of Berbers), some of whom had previously fought in the 2011 Libyan Civil War, either for the Libyan army (loyal to the regime of Muammar Gaddafi) or for the National Liberation Army (military branch of the National Transitional Council, which was Libyan opposition's head organization), and returned to Mali after the war. The movement was founded in October 2011 and has stated that it includes other Saharan peoples.

The Malian government accused the movement of having links to Al-Qaeda in the Islamic Maghreb. The MNLA denied this claim. Human Rights Watch and FIDH accused MNLA of terrorism and war crimes, a conclusion supported by the ICC. By 1 April 2012 the MNLA and Ansar Dine were in control of virtually all of northern Mali, including its three largest cities of Kidal, Gao, and Timbuktu. Tensions between the MNLA and Ansar Dine culminated in the Battle of Gao, in which the MNLA lost control of northern Malian cities to Ansar Dine and the Movement for Oneness and Jihad in West Africa.

== History ==
Since 1916, there have been at least five Tuareg rebellions. After the failure of the 2007–2009 rebellion in northern Niger and Mali, some Tuareg fighters left for Libya, where they were integrated into the ranks of the Libyan Army. At the end of 2011, following a successful NATO military intervention in Libya, which resulted in the defeat of the Libyan Arab Jamahiriya and the death of Libyan dictator Muammar Gaddafi, several Tuareg from the Libyan Army and the rebel National Transitional Council (NTC) returned to northern Mali. Many fighters returned for either financial reasons, such as losing their savings, or due to the alleged racism of NTC fighters and Libyan militias.

The MNLA was founded in October 2011; though it is sometimes considered to have been founded more than a year earlier in relation to other such groups. The MNLA claim to be a movement for the liberation of all the peoples of "Azawad" (Songhai, Arab, Fula, and Tuareg). Additionally, rumors suggested that battle-hardened Tuaregs from neighboring Niger provided significant assistance and military support to the group. On the subject of its composition, the MNLA has declared:

The MNLA (National Movement for the Liberation of Azawad) would like to make it clear that within the MNLA military command there are: old rebels from the uprisings of the 1990s (MFUA – Movements of the united Fronts of Azawad), of 2006 (MTNM – The Tuareg Movement of Northern Mali, which was led by the late Ibrahim Ag Bahanga), fighters who have returned from Libya but who mostly participated in the liberation of that country, volunteers from the various ethnicities of northern Mali (Tuareg, Songhai, Peul, and Moor) and both soldiers and officers who have deserted from the Malian army.

— Official Website of the MNLA

The MNLA was said to have been formed following a merger of the Northern Mali Tuareg Movement and other related groups. An alleged influx of arms, originally intended for rebels in Libya, led to a huge cache in the largely ungoverned desert areas around where the Tuareg live. This led to concern that much of the heavy weaponry remains unaccounted for.

Though some analyses have denied the movement's connections to either Al Qaeda in the Islamic Maghreb (AQIM) or Muammar Gaddafi and the Libyan Civil War, the rebellion was still read as being fuelled by weapons from Libya, as well as leftovers from previous rebellions in "Azawad" and even from Mali's army which were taken by defecting Arab and Tuareg personnel.

The group was considered to be secular. The Tuareg fighters within the ranks of the National Movement for the Liberation of Azawad have been considered former allies of Colonel Muammar Gaddafi which may have organized after the Tuareg Rebellion between 2007 and 2009.

MNLA's adopted flag for "Azawad".

The government of Mali accused the movement of cooperating with AQIM. The MNLA has denied this claim.

=== Factionalism ===
According to sources in the Malian government, the MNLA was rumored to have factionalized with the Islamist Ansar Dine claiming control of the region after the capture of several cities, previously attributed to the MNLA. Though the international media has linked the MNLA to Ansar Dine and AQIM, the MNLA distanced itself from both groups, stating that their sole goal is the independence of "Azawad". However, after the fall of Timbuktu, they declared that "Azawad" would be governed alongside Ansar Dine. On 26 May, the MNLA and Ansar Dine announced a pact in which they would merge to form an Islamist state, named the Islamic Republic of Azawad.

=== Fight for Independence ===
MNLA launched its armed campaign in January 2012 with the goal of freeing three regions of Mali from the central government's control and seeking the complete independence of "Azawad".

The MNLA's fight is for the Touareg military domination of northern Mali. (Area captured is indicated.)

In January, its fighters launched armed assaults on Andéramboukane, Ménaka, Tessalit, Niafunké, and Aguelhok. On 1 February, they reportedly managed to take control over several parts of northern Mali, including Menaka. During that time, several sources confirmed that the movement successfully opened a fifth front in the town of Lere. At the end of January, MNLA's commanders claimed to have shot down a Malian Air Force MiG-21, using surface-to-air missiles, that the movement's fighters acquired from NATO arms drops over Libya. Moreover, the Malian Armed Forces used helicopter gunships on several occasions to target the group's positions.

On 4 February 2012, the movement's fighters launched an attack on the government forces in Kidal, intending to take control of the town and occupy the two military bases that were located in the area. Further towns were seized and re-seized over the course of February and March. At the same time, in the aftermath of the armed clashes in the north, Tuareg civilians were said to have left Bamako for fear of reprisals. According to the International Committee of the Red Cross, 3,500 people had fled across the border to Mauritania, while a further 10,000 people had crossed into Niger during the armed clashes.

On 8 February 2012, Tinzaouaten was wrested from central government control after Malian troops took a "tactical withdrawal" following one soldier being killed in the battle and two others sustaining injuries, amid calls by the United Nations for a halt to the offensive. One rebel was also killed and another was wounded, while the MNLA seized two military bases and several weapons storage sites there. The ICRC added that there were 30,000 internally displaced persons, while the UN said that over 20,000 people have fled to Burkina Faso, Algeria, and Mauritania. Furthermore, the United Nations issued warnings of food shortages as a result of the fighting. Additionally, the United Nations High Commissioner for Refugees (UNHCR) estimated that approximately 22,000 people had been displaced in February.

The Economic Community of West African States (ECOWAS) planned to send a team to investigate the violence. It also condemned their actions and called for logistical support for Mali. After the March coup d'état, the MNLA, as well as Ansar Dine, took control not only of several small towns but also of the bigger cities of Kidal, Gao, and Timbuktu. Reuters reported that MNLA's capture of Timbuktu was the culmination of the group's plan to take control over northern Mali. Additionally, the MNLA announced that by taking Timbuktu, it sought to "dislodge Mali's remaining political and military administration" in the region, stating that it would rule the region with Ansar Dine in opposition to the administration in Bamako.

On 6 April, in an interview with France 24, an MNLA spokesman officially announced the independence of Azawad, declaring it as a sovereign and independent country, while stating that the movement would act as a provisional administration until a fully functional government is elected and confirmed.

Mali is an anarchic state. Therefore, we have gathered a national liberation movement to put in an army capable of securing our land and an executive office capable of forming democratic institutions. We declare the independence of Azawad from this day on.

— Mossa Ag Attaher, MLNA spokesman, 6 April 2012

In the same interview, Mossa Ag Attaher also promised that "Azawad" would "respect all the colonial frontiers that separate Azawad from its neighbours" and insisted that Azawad's declaration of independence has "some international legality." Two days after Azawad officially declared independence, the Arab-dominated National Liberation Front of Azawad (FLNA) was formed, whose primary task was to defend Timbuktu from a supposed Tuareg domination.

=== Conflict with Islamist groups ===
Although the MNLA collaborated with and fought alongside various Islamist groups against the Malian government in the beginning of the conflict, there were deep ideological differences between them. The MNLA's primary goal of establishing a secular, sovereign, and independent country of Azawad in the territory of northern Mali contrasted sharply with the aims of the Islamist groups, whose objective was to unite Mali under a theocratic government and impose Islamic sharia law on a countrywide level. Consequently, after the majority of the Malian Armed Forces had been defeated and expelled from the region, the two ideological camps began to turn against each other.

On 26 May, the MNLA and Ansar Dine announced a pact in which they would merge to form an Islamist state. However, some later reports indicated the MNLA had decided to withdraw from the pact, distancing itself from Ansar Dine.

On 26 June 2012, the tension erupted into combat in Gao between the MNLA and the Movement for Oneness and Jihad in West Africa (MOJWA), with both sides firing heavy weapons at each other's positions. MNLA Secretary-General Bilal ag Acherif was wounded in the battle. MOJWA managed to gain the upper hand, which resulted in the MNLA's troops being eventually forced to retreat from the city, as well as from Kidal and Timbuktu shortly afterwards. However, the MNLA stated that it continued to maintain forces and control some rural areas in the region. The following day, Ansar Dine announced that it was in control of all the cities of northern Mali.

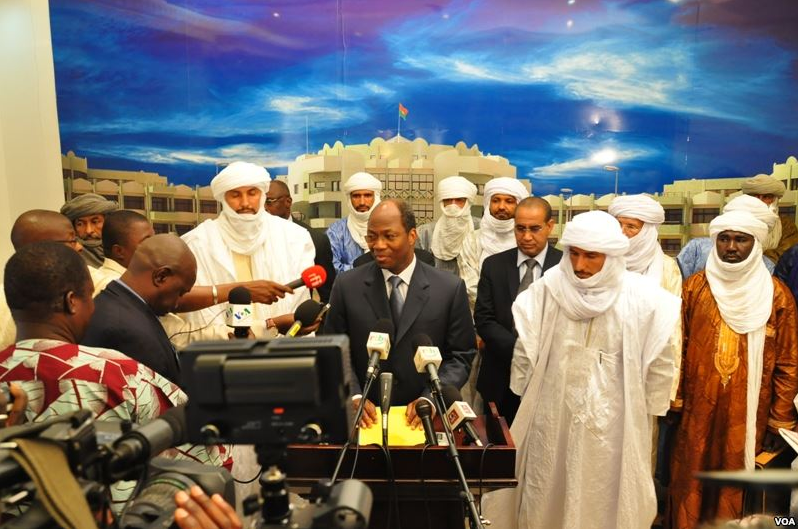
Ansar Dine and MNLA delegates in Ouagadougou with Burkina Faso President Blaise Compaoré, 16 November 2012

Initially, the MNLA retained control of the city of Ménaka, with hundreds of people taking refuge in the city from the Islamists, and the city of Tinzawatène near the Algerian border. In the same month, a splinter group broke off from the MNLA, calling itself the Front for the Liberation of the Azawad (FPA), and stating that Tuareg independence was no longer a "realistic goal" and that they must concentrate on fighting the Islamists.

On 16 November 2012, MNLA forces launched an offensive against Gao in an attempt to retake the town. However, by the end of the day, the Tuaregs were beaten back by the MOJWA forces after the Islamists laid an ambush for them. On 19 November 2012, MOJWA and AQIM forces took over Ménaka from the MNLA.

On 14 January 2013, after French intervention in the conflict had commenced, the MNLA declared it would fight alongside the French and even the Malian government to "end terrorism in Azawad." At the same time, the MNLA warned the Malian forces not to enter territories it considered its own before an official autonomy agreement was signed. The spokesman also declared that the MNLA would be a more effective force than those of the neighboring West African nations "because of our knowledge of the ground and the populations."

=== Return of Malian troops to Azawad ===
Following the French intervention in Mali, Malian troops and the MNLA signed a peace agreement. This allowed for Malian troops to return to such cities as Kidal. There were still reports of conflict between those who supported the presence of the 200 Malian soldiers at a local barracks and those who supported the MNLA, who sought to keep Malian soldiers out. Kidal's Deputy Mayor Abda Ag Kazina said, "The Malian army arrived in Kidal. There were two demonstrations, one was to support the army and the other was to prevent the army from returning. There were shots fired in the air and the protesters dispersed."

On 28 November 2013, after a few hundred Tuareg protesters were violently confronted by Malian soldiers over the visit of Malian Prime Minister Oumar Tatam Ly to MNLA-controlled Kidal, one of the MNLA founders, Attaye Ag Mohamed, said: "The political and military wings of the Azawad declare the lifting of the ceasefire with the central government in Bamako. All our military positions are on alert."

== Organization ==
=== Leadership ===
One of the founding leaders was said to be Moussa Ag Acharatoumane.

One of the officers he had met in Libya was Colonel Ag Mohamed Najem, who is said by the movement to be the head of its military wing. He is of Malian origin but resigned from the Libyan Army shortly after the uprising to join the Tuareg rebellion in Mali. Colonel Dilal Ag Alsherif is another military leader of the movement.

There are said to be about 40 officers in the MNLA movement. There are also deserters from the Malian Army, including officers. Colonel Nagim was one of the officers who led the military charge that resulted in the adversary's defeat and eventual capture of the two cities. The General-Secretary of the movement is Bilal Ag Acherif. The spokesman for the MNLA's political wing is Hama Ag Mahmoud. Following the independence declaration, Mahmoud Ag Aghaly was appointed as the head of the interim Executive Committee of the MNLA that was said to govern "Azawad".

=== Armed forces and equipment ===
Following their victory over the Malian army, the MNLA established their main base at the airport of Gao where they had stocked 30 functional tanks and 10 being repaired. An unnamed commander of the MNLA said that at the beginning they were mainly armed from weapons brought by fighters returning from Libya, but that later approximately 60% of their equipment was seized from the Malian army.

== Split-off ==
Ibrahim Ag Mohamed Assaleh, a former external relations representative of the MNLA, split off from the party in March 2014 and formed the Coalition for the People of Azawad. He was said to be frustrated at the "hardline" negotiations position Bilal Ag Acherif took when dealing with the Malian government.
