= Ménaka =

- Commune and town
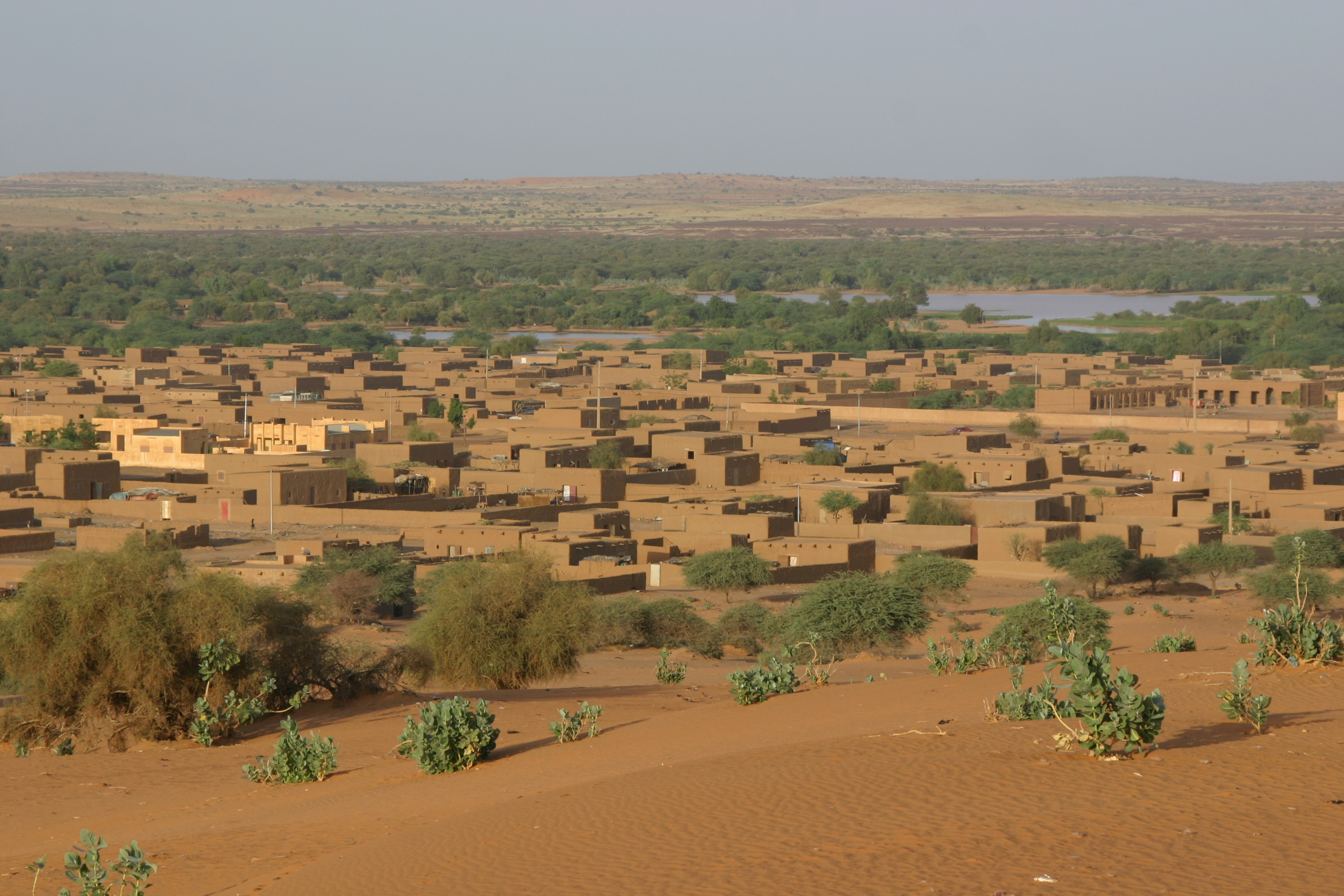

- Location within Mali
- Coordinates: 15°55′00″N 2°24′00″E
- Country: Mali
- Region: Ménaka
- Cercle: Ménaka

Government
  - Control: Mali

Population (2009 Census)
  - Total: 20,702
  - Summer (DST): UTC0

Ménaka (Berber: ⵎⵏⴾⴰ) is a town and urban commune in Ménaka Cercle and Ménaka Region in eastern Mali. It is the seat and the largest town in the cercle and region. The town is set amidst the rocky outcrops of the Ader Douchi hills, and is served by Ménaka Airport. As of May 2026, the town is under Malian government control, surrounded by the Islamic State – Sahel Province (ISSP). ISSP clashed with the Malian army in an attempt to capture the town on 28 April 2026, subsequently withdrawing to the outskirts of the city.

== Tuareg rebellions ==
The Ménaka area was a center of Ag El Insar Firhoun's Malian rising, part of the larger 1916 Tuareg Rebellion, and was a government garrison town in the 1961–1964, 1990–1995, and the 2007–2009 Tuareg Rebellions. Most recently, Ménaka was put under siege and the military post sacked by former rebels who had been integrated into the Malian Army in a short term rising in May–July 2006. The current May 23, 2006 Democratic Alliance for Change rebel group dates from this siege.

On 17 January 2012, Ménaka was captured by the National Movement for the Liberation of Azawad (MNLA), a Tuareg rebel group. On 19 November they lost their control to the Movement for Oneness and Jihad in West Africa and Al-Qaeda in the Islamic Maghreb.

== 2009 kidnappings ==
On 25 November 2009, a French citizen named Pierre Camatte was taken hostage from a hotel in Ménaka city. A January 2010 statement issued by the AQIM, the north African branch of al-Qaeda, set an ultimatum of 20 days for the exchange of four al-Qaeda members for Pierre Camatte, after which, it said the French and Malian governments "will be fully responsible for the French hostage's life". Camatte was freed 6 weeks later following a prisoner swap deal in which the four Islamists were released.

== Slavery ==
Malian and international Human Rights organisations pointed to Ménaka in 2008, as one of several towns in the Gao Region in which informal slavery relations persist between noble caste Tuareg pastoralists and thousands of sedentary low caste Bellah Tuareg.

== Climate ==
Climate data for Menaka (1961–1990)
Month	Jan	Feb	Mar	Apr	May	Jun	Jul	Aug	Sep	Oct	Nov	Dec	Year
Mean daily maximum °C (°F)	31.0 (87.8)	34.1 (93.4)	37.7 (99.9)	41.1 (106.0)	42.4 (108.3)	41.0 (105.8)	38.0 (100.4)	36.2 (97.2)	38.2 (100.8)	39.0 (102.2)	35.6 (96.1)	31.8 (89.2)	37.2 (99.0)
Mean daily minimum °C (°F)	15.2 (59.4)	17.5 (63.5)	21.1 (70.0)	25.1 (77.2)	28.2 (82.8)	28.3 (82.9)	26.3 (79.3)	25.0 (77.0)	25.4 (77.7)	24.1 (75.4)	19.7 (67.5)	16.0 (60.8)	22.6 (72.7)
Average precipitation mm (inches)	0.0 (0.0)	0.0 (0.0)	0.1 (0.00)	1.7 (0.07)	6.8 (0.27)	23.5 (0.93)	68.2 (2.69)	83.9 (3.30)	28.8 (1.13)	4.9 (0.19)	0.1 (0.00)	0.1 (0.00)	218.1 (8.59)
Average rainy days	0.0	0.0	0.2	0.3	1.5	4.1	7.2	8.8	5.2	0.9	0.1	0.1	28.4
Mean monthly sunshine hours	263.7	237.8	212.3	227.9	242.1	176.8	231.5	222.1	234.0	272.9	280.1	262.5	2,863.7
Source: NOAA
