= List of airports in Western Sahara =

This is a list of airports in Western Sahara, sorted by location.

== Airports ==
Airport names shown in bold indicate the airport has scheduled commercial airline service.

City served	ICAO	IATA	Airport name	Coordinates
Dakhla (Villa Cisneros)	GSVO / GMMH	VIL	**Dakhla Airport**	23°43′05″N 015°55′55″W
Laayoune (El Aaiún)	GSAI / GMML	EUN	**Hassan I Airport**	27°09′06″N 013°13′09″W
Smara (Esmara)	GSMA / GMMA	SMW	Smara Airport	26°43′54″N 011°41′04″W
La Güera		ZLG	La Güera Airport (closed)	20°51′0″N 017°5′0″W

- Laayoun Annex Air Base (May be a section of Hassan I Airport GMML/EUN)

There are other unpaved airstrips in Western Sahara:

- Oum Dreyga Airport
- a 1,960 metres (6,430 ft) marked north–south runway at the Moroccan occupation border control facilities south of Guerguerat.
- one rough dirt airstrip southwest of Tifariti
- two well defined dirt airstrips just west of Al Mahbes

== See also ==
- Legal status of Western Sahara
- List of airports in Morocco
- Transport in Western Sahara
- List of airports by ICAO code: G#Western Sahara
- Wikipedia: WikiProject Aviation/Airline destination lists: Africa#Western Sahara (claimed by Morocco)
