= Battle of Al Mahbes =

Battle of Al Mahbes may refer to:

- Battle of Al Mahbes (1979)
- Battle of Al Mahbes (1985)
