= Timeline of the Western Saharan clashes (2020–present) =

This is the Timeline of the Western Saharan clashes (2020–present).

== Timeline ==
=== 2020 ===
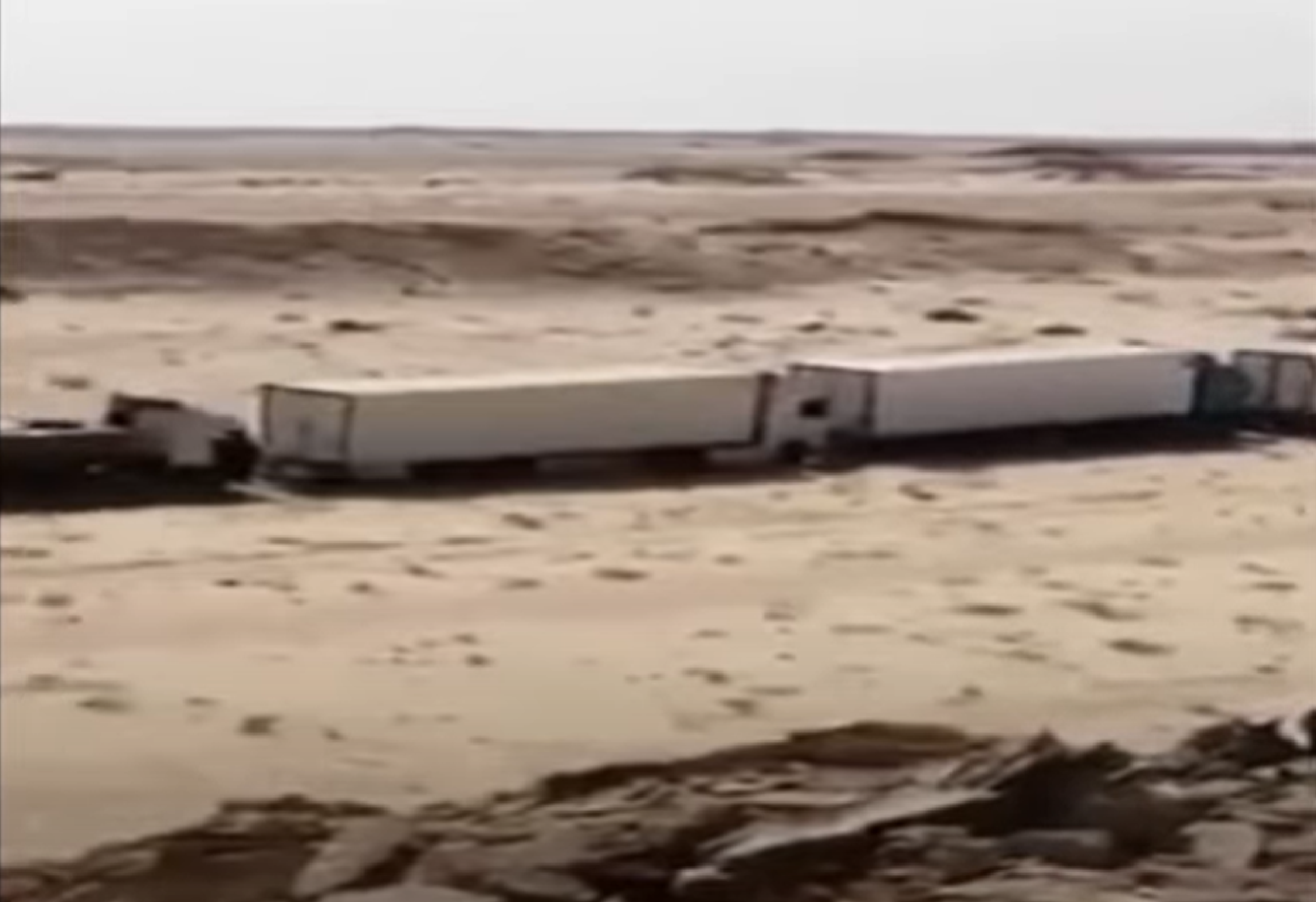
Moroccan trucks being blocked

- 13 November: The clashes erupted on 13 November, when the Moroccan forces launched an offensive on Guerguerat to seize control of the road passing by the village, which was blocked by around 50 Sahrawi activists and a few SPLA fighters. In the ensuing engagement, both sides exchanged gunfire; however, no casualties were reported as both the SPLA and the protesters quickly retreated from the scene. The Moroccan authorities stated that they had acted in self-defence, after a Sahrawi attack on Al Mahbes, and launched an offensive to restore free circulation of civilian and commercial traffic in the area. Later in the day, MINURSO observed three breaches across the berm southeast of Guerguerat as well as Moroccan bulldozers constructing a new sand wall through the buffer strip 6 km east of the road. In response to these events, Polisario Front stated that its forces fired upon four Moroccan bases and two checkpoints along the security wall. Since the initial clash, the Moroccan military has kept a presence in Guerguerat and along the road in violation of the ceasefire agreement.
- 14 November: The Sahrawi Arab Democratic Republic officially declared war on Morocco. The Polisario Front then stated that its forces had launched attacks on Moroccan military positions near Bagari, Al Mahbes, and Guerguerat. Morocco denied that it suffered casualties.
- 15 November: More skirmishing was reported between SADR and Moroccan forces along the security wall, especially near Al Mahbes where Moroccan forces claimed to have destroyed an SPLA armoured vehicle.
- 16 November: MINURSO reported continued skirmishing along the security wall.
- 18 November: MINURSO reported harassing fire at points along the security wall.
- 24 November: The spokesman for the United Nations Secretary-General, Stéphane Dujarric, stated during his daily press briefing that MINURSO remains present and continues to monitor the situation throughout the territory, including Guerguerat. The United Nations also continues to receive reports of fire scattered throughout the northern and eastern parts of the berm, with the spokesperson stating that these incidents often occur at night.
- 11 December: The spokesman for the UN Secretary-General, Stéphane Dujarric, stated that the United Nations was still in contact with MINURSO in Western Sahara and that the mission had not witnessed any activity on the ground that would raise any concern in the past 24 hours.

=== 2021 ===
- 23 January: The Polisario Front's official news agency reported that they fired four missiles near a Moroccan-controlled border post at Guerguerat.
- 3 February: For the 43rd consecutive day, the SADR has claimed to attack Moroccan positions. The SADR Ministry of National Defense said they have carried out concentrated bombardments against Moroccan positions in Gararat Al-Firsik region, Mahbes sector. Along with bombardment in Um Dagan region, Al-Bagari sector; Ajbeilat Lajdar region, Guelta sector; and Lagseibiyin region, Farsía Sector.
- 9 February: The Polisario claimed that it had killed three Moroccan soldiers the previous day in a specific attack in the Ouarkziz region of southern Morocco, near the disputed territory of Western Sahara. Contacted by the French press, the information was not denied by the Moroccan government.
- 1 March: A spokesperson for António Guterres, the United Nations' Secretary-General, addressed the situation in Western Sahara during a daily press briefing. According to a near-verbatim transcript, he said that MINURSO "continues to receive unconfirmed reports of sporadic firing across the berm."
- 8 April: The Polisario head of the gendarmerie Addah al-Bendir was killed by what reports claim to be a drone strike, while attempting raid on Moroccan positions along berm. The Sahrawi Ministry of Defense reported the military commander's "martyrdom," confirming his death to AFP. However, moments after publishing the news in the Polisario Front's official news agency, the Sahrawi Ministry of Defense removed it from its official publication.
- 14 October: A patrol of the Sahrawi People's Liberation Army consisting of several armed vehicles opened fire at a guard post near the Moroccan wall on Thursday night. The Royal Moroccan Army fired back and repelled the attack.
- 17 October: Brahim Ghali announced that attacks on Morocco by the Sahrawi People's Liberation Army will continue.
- 18 October: The Polisario Front fired rockets along sites near Al Mahbes.
- 14/15 November: Two Moroccan drone strikes hit SUVs near the berm, killing 11 people. The Moroccan government claims they were members of the Polisario Front attempting to cross the Moroccan Western Sahara Wall, while pro-Polisario sources claimed they were civilians, although some pro-Polisario sources did acknowledge the "martyrdom" of one militant.
- 17 November: The Sahrawi People's Liberation Army (SPLA), through its official news agency, claimed to have concentrated their artillery fire against the Moroccan forces entrenched in the Acheidmiya and Rus Asabti regions, in the Mahbes sector.
- 18 November: The SPLA stated it had carried out bombardments against Moroccan forces in north of the Galb Dirit region, in the Hauza sector and the Gabl Ad-dalim region, in the Tichla sector.
- 19 November: The SPLA stated it had carried out new attacks against Moroccan forces at various points of the Moroccan berm, in the Laagad and Sabjat Tnushad regions, both in the Mahbes region. Brahim Ghali criticized the Resolution 2602 of the UN Security Council, and recalls that the Polisario Front cannot commit to any cooperation outside the framework agreed in the 1991 AU-UN Solution Plan.
- 20 November: The SPLA stated it had carried out new attacks against the Moroccan forces positioned in the regions of Russ Sabti and the Udey Amarkba, in the Mahbes sector. Robert F. Kennedy Human Rights expressed its "deep concern" over reports of attacks and human rights violations against Sultana Sid Brahim Khaya by Morocco.
- 21 November: The SPLA stated it had carried out new attacks against the Moroccan forces positioned in the region of Fadrat Almars in the Hauza sector. Polisario front demanded all foreign companies to immediately withdraw from Western Sahara, considering their presence in the region as a flagrant violation of international law.
- 22 November: The SPLA stated it had carried out new attacks against Moroccan forces positioned in the regions of Fadrat Tamat, Um Dagan and Sabjat Tanuchad, in the Hauza, Bagari and Mahbes sectors, respectively. The SADR called on the African Commission on Human and Peoples' Rights to end Morocco's military presence in Western Sahara.
- 23 November: The SPLA stated it had carried out new attacks against the Moroccan occupation forces positioned in the regions of Tajalit At-talah and Guerat Uld Blal, in the sectors of Um Dreiga and Mahbes, respectively.
- 24 November: The SPLA stated it had carried out new attacks against the positions and entrenchments of the Moroccan forces at various points of the Moroccan wall, in the Fadrat Al-maras region in the Hauza sector.
- 25 November: The SPLA stated it had carried out new attacks against the positions and entrenchments of the Moroccan forces at various points of the Moroccan wall, in Sabjat Tanuchad and Guerat Uld Blal regions in Mahbes sector.
- 1 December: The SPLA stated it had carried out new attacks against positions of the Moroccan forces along the Moroccan wall, in the region of Tajalit At-Talah in Um Dreiga sector, Udey Adamrán in Mahbes and the command of the 43rd Regiment located in the Amitir Lemkhinza region, in Mahbes.
- 2 December: The SPLA stated it had carried out attacks on Moroccan forces entrenched in the Laagad and Guerat ULD Blal areas, both in the Mahbes sector.
- 3 December: The SPLA stated it had launched bombardments at Moroccan positions, in the regions of Um Dagan and Fadrat Almars, in the Bagari and Hauza sectors, respectively.
- 4 December: The SPLA stated it had launched bombardments at Moroccan positions, in the regions of Agrarat al-Atása and the Udey Damrán, Mahbes sector, as well as the regions of Tajalat Talh and Steilat Uld Bugrein in the Um Dreiga and Auserd sectors, respectively.
- 5 December: The SPLA stated it had carried out new attacks against the Moroccan forces in the sectors of Hauza, Umdrega, Awsard and Mahbes.
- 6 December: The Spanish Minister of Foreign Affairs, José Manuel Albares, reaffirmed his country's commitment to the relaunch of the dialogue to resolve the conflict in Western Sahara.
- 7 December: Brahim Ghali, affirmed in a letter he addressed to the UN Secretary General, António Guterres, that "[the Polisario] will not engage in any peace process while the Moroccan state continues imposing its reign on the Saharawi civilians in the occupied territories of Western Sahara."
- 8 December: The SPLA stated it had launched new attacks against various targets of the Moroccan forces at different points of their positions throughout from the Moroccan Wall.
- 9 December: Brahim Ghali, affirmed to the Polisario's official news agency that "the Polisario will not adhere to any peace process at a time when Morocco imposes its regime on the occupied Sahrawi territories".
- 10 December: The SPLA stated it had carried out attacks on FAR base 14 and destroyed its radar in the regions of Guerat ULD Blal, Udey Damrán and Udey Emarkba, the Mahbes sector, and reached the area of Fadrat Aaach in the Hauza sector.
- 11 December: The SPLA stated it had carried out new attacks against positions of the Moroccan forces in Galb Nass and Aadeim Umajlud in the Hauza and Auserd sectors, respectively and bombarded the northern area of Dirit located in the Hauza sector.
- 12 December: The SPLA stated it had launched bombardments at the regions of Galb Nass and Aadeim Umajlud in the Hauza and Auserd sectors. According to the Polisario's official news agency, Brahim Ghali, said during a speech in the Dakhla refugee camp in Tindouf, Algeria that "the Moroccan occupier is the origin of the conflict in El Guerguerat given the assaults he committed against the Sahrawi people."
- 13 December: The SPLA stated it had bombed the regions of Laagad, Grarat Alfarsik and Asteilat ULD Bugrein in the Mahbes and Auserd sectors, respectively.
- 14 December: The SPLA stated it had launched concentrated bombardments against Moroccan positions in the regions of Rus Bin Zakka, Dirit, Al-Aidiyat and Rus Bin Amera, in the sectors of Hauza, Guelta and Farsía, respectively.
- 15 December: The SPLA stated it had launched concentrated bombardments against the positions and entrenchments of the Moroccan forces in the regions of Gararat Al-Firsik and Rus Asabti, in the Mahbes sector.
- 16 December: The SPLA stated it had carried out new attacks against positions of the Moroccan forces along the Moroccan wall, in the regions of Udeyat Achadida, Taraganit, Lagteitira, Lagseibi Lamlas and Asteilat Uld Bugrein in the Farsía, Hauza and Auserd sectors.
- 17 December: The SPLA stated it had carried out new attacks against positions of the Moroccan forces along the Moroccan wall, in the regions of Udey Damrán and Udey Amarkba in the Mahbes sector.
- 18 December: The SPLA stated it had carried out new attacks against positions of the Moroccan forces in the Agseiby Najla, Rass Lagseibi, Fadrat Almars and Alatása in the Hauza and Mahbes sectors, respectively.
- 19 December: The SPLA stated it had carried out intensive attacks targeting Moroccan soldiers in the regions of Targanat, Russ Arbeib, Al ga'aa, Lagteitira, Aadeim Um Ajlud, Aadeim Um Ajlud, Sabjat Tanuchad and allegedly bombed the headquarters of the Royal Moroccan Army's 43rd regiment in the Ameitir Lamjeinza, in the Hauza, Auserd and Mahbes sectors.
- 20 December: The SPLA stated it had carried out new attacks against positions of the Moroccan forces in the regions of Hafrat Achiaf, Galb An-nas and Gararat Al-Firsik in the sectors of Bagari, Auserd and Mahbes, respectively.
- 21 December: The SPLA stated it had concentrated their attacks against Moroccan forces in Fadrat Labeir, Fadrat Al-Ich, Taraganit, Galb An-nas, Asteilat Uld Bugrein, Udei Adamran and Udei Um Rakba regions in the sectors of Farsía, Hauza, Auserd and Mahbes.
- 22 December: The SPLA stated it had attacked several positions of the Moroccan forces along the Moroccan wall in Laagad, Sabjat Tanuchad and Um Dagan regions, in the Mahbes and Bagari sectors, respectively.
- 23 December: The SPLA stated it had bombed Moroccan positions in the Fadrat Abruk region, Hauza sector
- 24 December: The SPLA stated it had attacked several positions of the Moroccan forces along the Moroccan wall, in Tuayil area in the Umdreiga sector.
- 25 December: The SPLA stated it had carried out new attacks against the entrenchments of the Moroccan forces in the area of Fadrat Alaaach, in the Hauza sector, and Russ Sabti in the Mahbes sector.
- 26 December: The SPLA stated it had attacked several positions of the Moroccan forces along the Moroccan wall, in the Russ Sabti and Udey Amarkba areas, both in the Mahbes sector.
- 27 December: The SPLA stated it had intensified their attacks on the entrenchments of the Moroccan forces in the two regions of Astila Ould Boukrine and Kelb Ennes in the Ausard sector, and in Akouira Ould Ablal in the Mahbes sector.
- 28 December: The SPLA stated it had attacked several positions of the Moroccan forces along the Moroccan wall, in Edeim Umm Jlud region, Auserd sector in addition to Rus Sabbti and Cheidmia, in the Mahbes sector.
- 29 December: The SPLA stated it had attacked several positions of the Moroccan forces, in the Rus Udei Adamran regions, in Mahbes, and the Adeim Um Ajlud region, in Auserd.
- 30 December: The SPLA stated it had concentrated their attacks against the Moroccan forces in the regions of Fadrat Lagrab, Rus Fadrat Lagrab, Rus Fadrat Dirit, Rus Arbeiyab Al-Geya, Rus Lagteitra and Fadrat Taraganit, in the Hauza sector. The commander of the SPLA, Mohamed Luali Akeik, stated that "[the SPLA] will continue its mission of fighting until achieving independence and establishing total sovereignty over Western Sahara."
- 31 December: The SPLA stated it had carried out attacks on the areas of Lagseiby Lamlas, Lagseiby Kassar and the area of Lamkeitab, both in the Hauza sector and the Sabjat Tanuchad area in the Mahbes sector.

=== 2022 ===
- 1 January: The SPLA stated it had bombarded the 43rd regiment of the Moroccan Army in the Amitir Lemkhinza region, and carried out attacks on the Laâked area in the Mahbes sector.
- 2 January: The SPLA stated it had carried out new attacks in Ahreichat Dirit and Udey Damran regions in the Hauza and Mahbes sectors, respectively.
- 3 January: The SPLA stated it had carried out new attacks against the Moroccan forces in Oudi Edamrane area in the Mahbas sector.
- 4 January: The SPLA stated it had launched new attacks against the entrenchments of the Moroccan forces in the Laagad region, Mahbes sector.
- 5 January: The SPLA stated it had concentrated their bombardments against Moroccan forces positioned in the Rus Bin Amera region, in the Farsia region, as well as the regions of Laagad, Udei Adamran, Gararat Al-Firsik and Sabjat Tanuchad, in the Mahbes sector. The SPLA also reportedly carried outbombardments against the 65th regiment's command post in the Laagad region.
- 6 January: The SPLA stated it had concentrated their bombardments on the regions of Bin Zakka, Rus Lagseibiyin and Fadrat Al-Ich in the Hauza sector.
- 7 January: The SPLA stated it had bombed the areas of Udey Damrán, Sabjat Tanuchad, Russ Sabti, Grarat Afarsik and Guerat ULD Blal in the Mahbes sector.
- 8 January: The SPLA stated it had bombed the region of Sabjat Tanuchad, in the Mahbes sector.
- 9 January: The SPLA stated it had bombed the regions of Grarat Alfarsik and Galb Nass in the Mahbes and Auserd sectors, respectively.
- 10 January: The SPLA stated it had bombed the regions of Fadrat Lagrab, Fadrat Al-Ich and Rus Asabti, in the sectors of Hauza and Mahbes, respectively. The representative of the Polisario Front to the United Nations, Sidi Mohamed Omar, affirmed that "the Saharawi side is willing to cooperate with the efforts of the United Nations and the African Union to achieve a peaceful and lasting solution to the conflict".
- 11 January: The SPLA stated it had concentrated their bombardments against Moroccan forces in the regions of Jangat Huría, Rus Udei As-sfaa and Gararat Lahdid, in the Smara and Farsía sectors, respectively.
- 12 January: The SPLA, stated through its official news agency that their units carried out concentrated attacks against the entrenchments of the Moroccan forces in the Fadrat Al-Mars region, in the Hauza and the regions of Um Lagsa and Acheidmiya, in the Mahbes sector. The latter region had several vehicles and military equipment destroyed in the attacked base, including a Katyusha rocket launcher.
- 13 January: The SPLA stated it had bombed the regions of Rus Faraa Udei As-sfaa, Fadrat Al-Ich, Guerat Uld Blal and Sabjat Tanuchad in the regions of Hauza and Mahbes. The United Nations Personal Envoy for Western Sahara, Staffan de Mistura visited Rabat to meet Nasser Bourita, the Moroccan Minister of Foreign Affairs and Omar Hilale, Morocco's Permanent Ambassador to the United Nations, as part of the UN efforts to promote negotiations between the parties in conflict and a solution to the dispute. Morocco reiterated its position that Morocco has full sovereignty over Western Sahara.
- 14 January: The SPLA stated that it had launched bombardments at the Moroccan army's 43rd battalion command headquarters in the Umeitir Lamjeinza area, and at Moroccan positions stationed in the areas of Agrarat Al-Farsik and Russ Sabti, both in the Mahbes sector.
- 15 January: The UN Personal Envoy for Western Sahara, Staffan de Mistura visited Algers and the Saharawi refugee camps in Tindouf, as part of the UN efforts to promote negotiations between the parties in conflict and a solution to the dispute. de Mistura met high-ranking officials of the Polisario Front, and the Secretary General of the Polisario Front, Brahim Ghali. Sidi Mohamed Omar, stated that "he does not expect much from de Mistura's visit, considering it a contact visit with the authorities of the parties in the conflict, (namely the SADR and Morocco), not in negotiation." Omar later stated that "[the Polisario front] no longer sees the self-determination referendum as a possible solution, but cling to their legitimate right to full independence for Western Sahara". During his visit to the Tindouf camps, de Mistura was photographed with a child soldier serving for the Polisario Front, this caused widespread controversy and indignation, the UN Press Secretary later denied that de Mistura noticing the child soldier. The SPLA stated it had launched bombardments in the Umeitir Lamjeinza area, and at Moroccan positions stationed in the Agrarat Al-Farsik and Russ Sabti areas, both in the Mahbes sector.
- 16 January: De Mistura met with the head of the Political Organization of the Polisario Front, Khatri Addouh, in Dar Diafa, Shahid Al Hafed. The chief negotiator affirmed that UN should seek peaceful settlement based on failure of past approaches. Later, he was received by Brahim Ghali in his office at the Saharawi Presidency with the presence of the Polisario representative at the UN, Sidi Mohamed Omar. The President of the CONASADH, Abba El-Haissan, warned about UN Failure to protect international humanitarian and human rights laws in Western Sahara. The SPLA said that it had launched new attacks on military targets in the Mahbes sector. The Chief of Staff of the Saharawi Army, Mohamed Luali Akeik, said that the conflict continues despite the fact that Morocco denied it.
- 17 January: De Mistura concluded his peacekeeping visit, heading to Nouakchott on his third stop, as part of his first tour to the region. The SPLA stated it had attacked the positions of the Moroccan forces in the Gararat Achadida and Gararat Lahdid regions, in the Farsía sector.
- 18 January: The SPLA stated it had carried out bombardments on the Fadrat Al-Ich and Adeim Um Ajlud regions, in the Hauza and Auserd sectors, respectively.
- 19 January: The SPLA stated it had launched bombardments against the positions of the Moroccan forces in the Gararat Al-Firsik and Udei Adamran regions, in the Mahbes sector.
- 20 January: The SPLA stated it had launched concentrated attacks against the positions of the Moroccan forces along the Moroccan Wall, in the Galb An-nas and Ahreichat Dirit regions, in the Auserd and Hauza sectors, respectively.
- 21 January: The SPLA stated it had launched bombardments in the areas of Laagad, Guerat ULD Blal and Fadrat Lagráb in the Mahbes and Hauza sectors, respectively.
- 22 January: The SPLA stated it had launched bombardments on the Russ Sabti and Agrarat Al-Farsik areas and on Moroccan troops stationed in the Udey Damran area, both in the Mahbes sector.
- 23 January: The SPLA stated it had launched bombings on Fadrat Lagraab, Galb Nass and Agrarat Al-Farsik regions in the Hauza, Auserd and Mahbes sectors, respectively.
- 24 January: The SPLA stated it had made attacks on Laagad, Tanuchad and Agrarat Al-Farsik in the Mahbes sector.
- 25 January: The SPLA stated it had attacked the Moroccan positions at various points of the Moroccan Wall, in the Guerat ULD Blal region in Mahbes sector.
- 26 January: The SPLA stated it had launched shelling against Moroccan forces in the Sabjat Tanuchad and Um Dagan regions, in the Mahbes and Bagari sectors, respectively.
- 27 January: The SPLA stated it had bombarded Moroccan positions in the Sabjat Tanuchad and Gararat Al-Firsik regions, in the Mahbes sector. In his speech, Brahim Ghali blamed "the Moroccan State for the serious events that threaten peace and security in the region".
- 28 January: The SPLA stated it had launched bombardments in the Fadrat Laach and Russ Dirit areas, both in the Hauza sector.
- 29 January: The SPLA stated it had launched bombardments in the Farsía sector, and the Galb Nass and Fadrat Tamát regions in the Auserd and Hauza sectors, respectively.
- 30 January: The SPLA stated it had launched bombardments in the areas of Sabjat Tanuchad and Udey Damrán, both in the Mahbes sector.
- 31 January: The SPLA stated it had attacked the positions of Moroccan forces in the regions of Laagad, Steilat Uld Bugerin and Um Dagan, in the sectors of Mahbes, Auserd and Bagari, respectively.
- 1 February: The SPLA stated it had launched bombings at the command post of the Moroccan army's 65th regiment in Laagad, as well as several targets in the Aagad Arkan region, in Mahbes.
- 2 February: The SPLA stated it had concentrated their attacks against the Moroccan forces positioned in the Agsibi An-Najla, Agseibi Amchagab and Lagseibi Lamlas, in the Hauza sector and the Sabjat Tanuchad, Udei Adamran and Laaran regions, in Mahbes.
- 3 February: The SPLA stated it had launched bombings against the Moroccan forces positioned in the Fadrat Al-Ich and Fadrat Lagrab regions.
- 4 February: The SPLA stated it had launched bombing attacks on Moroccan positions in the Russ Arbeib, Russ Lagteitira and Russ Turkanat regions in the Hauza sector.
- 5 February: The SPLA stated it had launched bombardments on Moroccan positions in the regions of Sabjat Tanuchad and Laagad in the Mahbes sector, and Russ Arbeib, Russ Lagteitira and Russ Turkanat in the Hauza sector.
- 6 February: During the 35th Summit of African Union Heads of State and Government held in Addis Ababa, Brahim Ghali informed African leaders of "the dangerous developments recorded in Western Sahara after the end of ceasefire", He compares "the practices pursued by Morocco [against Sahrawi people] to those practiced by the Israeli occupation against the Palestinian people". The SPLA stated it had carried out new attacks against positions of the Moroccan forces in the regions of Chadimiya and Rous Es-sebti in the Mahbas sector, as well as in the region of Laksibi Lamlas in the Hawza sector.
- 7 February: The SPLA stated it had targeted the entrenchments of Moroccan soldiers in several regions of the Hawza sector, including the regions of Rous Benzekka, Lemkiteb and Rous Terkanet.
- 8 February: The SPLA stated it had launched heavy bombardments against various positions along the Moroccan Wall, in the Gararat Achadida and Gararat Lahdid regions in the Farsía sector, and the Gararat Al-Firsik, Udei Adamran, Laagad and Udei Um Rakba regions in the Mahbes sector.
- 9 February: The SADR Ministry of Defense issued a war report summarising the combat operations that have been carried out by the SPLA in the first week of February, including a list of a total 12 Moroccan human losses. The SPLA stated it had launched concentrated bombardments in the Lagseibi Lamlas region, in Hauza, as well as in the Um Lagta and Sabjat Tanucahd regions, in Mahbes.
- 10 February: The SPLA stated it had concentrated their attacks against the entrenchments of Moroccan forces in the Gararat Al-Firsik, Um Dagan, Rus Taraganit and Fadrat Labeir regions in the Mahbes, Bagari, Hauza and Farsia sectors, respectively.
- 11 February: A senior military official in the Sixth Military Region of the SPLA told the Polisario Front's official news agency that there were 8 Moroccan losses in early February 2022 near Mahbes. Morocco allegedly stated that the cause of these deaths was due to COVID-19 or other causes. The SPLA stated it had launched bombing attacks on Moroccan positions in the Agseiby Najla and Agseibi Amchagab regions in the Hauza sector.
- 12 February: The SPLA stated it had launched bombardments in the regions of Udey Adamrán and Agrarat Al-Farsik in the Mahbes sector, and the Tandkama Al-Bayda area, Um Dreiga sector.
- 13 February: The SPLA stated it had launched bombardments in Laagad, Sabjat Tanuchad and Lamkeitab regions in the Mahbes and Hauza sectors, respectively.
- 14 February: The SPLA stated it had attacked the regions of Galb An-nas, Tandakma Al-Beida and Guerat Uld Blal in the Auserd, Um Dreiga and Mahbes sectors, respectively.
- 15 February: The SPLA stated it had launched several attacks against the Moroccan forces in the Udei Adamran, Fadrat Tamat and Sahab Achadida in the Mahbes, Hauza and Farsía sectors, respectively.
- 18 February: The SPLA stated it had launched bombing attacks on Moroccan positions in the Um Dagan area in the Bagari sector.
- 19 February: The SPLA stated it had launched bombardments on Moroccan positions in the regions of Al-Aría, Lairán, Aagad Argán, Guerat ULD Blal and the 65th regiment's command headquarters of the Moroccan army in Laaked, Mahbes sector, as well as the Russ Lagteitira and Um Dagan regions in the Hauza and Bagari sectors, respectively.
- 20 February: The SPLA stated it had launched bombing attacks on Moroccan positions in the Sabjat Tanuchad, Lagseibi Lamlas and Legseibi Al-Kasir and Aadeim Um Ajlud, in the Mahbes, Hauza and Auserd sectors, respectively.
- 21 February: The SPLA stated it had launched bombing attacks on Moroccan positions in the Russ Targánat region in the Hauza sector.
- 22 February: The SPLA stated it had launched new attacks in the Mahbes sector, against the entrenchments of the Moroccan forces in the regions of Gararat Al-Firsik and Udei Um Rakba.
- 23 February: The SPLA stated it had launched heavy shelling against the entrenchments of the Moroccan forces in Rus Asabti region, in the Mahbes sector and in the Amagli Adachra and Amagli Labgar regions, in the Amgala sector.
- 24 February: The SPLA stated it had attacked Moroccan forces positioned in the Tandakma Al-Beida and Um Dagan regions, in the Bagari sector and in the Azamul Um Jamla region, in Um Dreiga. In addition, SPLA attacked Moroccan forces entrenched in the Gararat Al-Atasa region, as well as the 43rd regiment's command base in the Ameitir Lamjeinza region, in the Mahbes sector.
- 25 February: The SPLA stated it had bombarded Moroccan positions in the areas of Laagad, Guerta Uld Blal, Sabjat Tanuchad and Russ Udey Damràn, in the Mahbes sector, as well as the Tandagma Albeida region, in the Bagari sector.
- 26 February: The SPLA stated it had launched bombing attacks on Moroccan positions in the Grarat Alfarsik and Udey Emarkba areas, in the Mahbes sector.
- 27 February: The SPLA stated it had bombarded Moroccan positions in the Rus Acheidmiya and Udey Damràn areas, in the Mahbes sector.
- 28 February: The SPLA stated it had attacked Moroccan positions in the Guerat Uld Blal and Sabjat Tanuchad regions, in the Mahbes sector, and in the Adeim Um Ajlud region, in Auserd sector.
- 1 February: The SPLA stated it had attacked Moroccan forces in the Udei Um Rkba and Gararat Al-Firsik regions, in the Mahbes sector.
- 2 February: The SPLA stated it had bombarded Moroccan positions in the Gasbat Achuhada and Gararat Al-Arabi regions, in the Atweizegui sector and the Amheibas At-tarab, Aagad Aragan and Laaran, in the Mahbes sector.
- 3 February: The SPLA stated it had bombarded Moroccan positions in the Gararat Al-Firsik region, in the Mahbes sector.
- 4 February: The SPLA stated it had bombarded the 43rd regiment's command base of the Moroccan army in the Ameitir Lamjeinza region, in the Mahbes sector, and neutralized a Moroccan BM-21 Grad artillery battery.
- 5 February: The SPLA stated it had attacked Moroccan forces in the areas of Guerat Uld Blal and Sabjat Tanuchad, in the Mahbes sector.
- 6 February: The SPLA stated it had launched bombardments on Moroccan positions located in the Guerat Uld Blal, Sabjat Tanuchad, Grarat Alfarsik, Amheibas Tedrib, Aagad Argàn, Laaràn, Agseibat Shuhadà and Grarat Alaarbi in the Mahbes and Tuizgui sectors, respectively.
- 7 February: The SPLA stated it had launched bombardments on Moroccan positions located in the Grarat Chdeida, Russ Sueihat and Taraf Ahmeida areas, in the Farsía sector and in the Fadrat Laach area in the Hauza sector, as well as in Um Lagta and Laagad, in the Mahbes sector.
- 8 February: The SPLA stated it had bombarded the entrenchments of the Moroccan forces in the Guerat Uld Blal, Laagad, Sabjat Tanuchad, Gararat Al-Firsik and Um Lagti regions in the Mahbes sector.
- 9 February: The SPLA stated it had carried out new attacks against the Moroccan forces positioned in the Laagad region, in the Mahbes sector.
- 11 February: The SPLA stated it had launched bombardments on Moroccan positions located in the Grarat Alfarsik and Udey Damràn regions, in the Mahbes sector.
- 12 February: The SPLA stated it had launched bombardments on Moroccan positions located in the Russ Cheidmiya and Udey Amarkba areas, in the Mahbes sector.
- 13 February: The SPLA stated it had launched bombardments on Moroccan positions located in the Grarat Chdeida and Alfieín regions, in the Farsìa sector.
- 14 February: The SPLA stated it had bombarded Moroccan positions in the Gararat Achadida, Gararat Lahdid and Al-Faiyin regions, in the Farsía sector, as well as in the Tanuchad region, in the Mahbes sector.
- 15 February: The SPLA stated it had attacked Moroccan forces in the Guerat Uld Blal region, in the Mahbes sector.
- 16 February: The SPLA stated it had attacked Moroccan forces positioned in the Garart Achadida, Ajbeilat Aljadar and Gararat Al-Firsik regions in the Farsía, Guelta and Mahbes sectors, respectively.
- 17 February: The SPLA stated it had launched bombardments on Moroccan forces located in the Rus Asabti and Udei Adamrán regions, in the Mahbes sector.
- 19 February: The SPLA stated it had launched new attacks in the Grarat Chdeid, Jbeilat Aljadar and Grarat Al-Farsik areas in the Farsía, Guelta and Mahbes sectors.
- 19 February: The SPLA stated it had bombarded Moroccan positions in the Laagad area in the Mahbes sector.
- 20 February: The SPLA stated it had launched bombardments on Moroccan positions located in the Guerat Uld Blal area in the Mahbes sector.
- 21 February: The SPLA stated it had launched bombardments on Moroccan positions located in the Ajbeilat Aljadar area in the Guelta sector.
- 22 February: The SPLA stated it had bombarded Moroccan positions in the Acheidmiya, Rus Asabti and Udei Adamran regions, in the Mahbes sector.
- 23 February: The SPLA stated it had launched bombing attacks on Moroccan positions in the Rus Ajbeilat Lajdar, Laagad, Guerat Uld Blal and Sabjat Tanuchad regions, in the Mahbes and Guelta sectors, respectively.
- 24 February: The SPLA stated it had attacked Moroccan positions in the Udei Um Rakba region, in the Mahbes sector.
- 25 February: The SPLA stated it had bombarded Moroccan positions in the Laagad and Guerat Uld Blal, in the Mahbes sector.
- 26 February: The SPLA stated it had attacked Moroccan positions in the Grarat Alfarsik, Udey Damrà and Russ sabti regions, in the Mahbes sector and in the Amagli Dachra and Amigli Alhàra regions, in the Guelta sector.
- 27 February: The SPLA stated it had launched bombardments on Moroccan forces located in the Um lagta, Russ Cheidmiya, Grarata Chdeida, Grarat Lahdid and Ajbeilat Albid regions in the Mahbes, Farsía and Guelta sectors, respectively.
- 28 February: The SPLA stated it had launched bombardments against Moroccan positions located in the Guerat Uld Blal region, Laagad, and Gaarat Al-Firsik, in the Mahbes sector, as well as in the regions of Taref Hamida, Rus Asweihat and Gararat Achadida, in the Farsia sector.
- 2 February: The SPLA stated it had launched bombardments against Moroccan positions in the Laagaad and Grarat Alfarsik areas, both in the Mahbes sector.
- 3 February: The SPLA stated it had launched bombardments against Moroccan positions in the Udey Damràn area in the Mahbes sector.
- 4 February: The SPLA stated it had launched bombardments on Moroccan forces in the Kaydiat area, Um Dreiga sector.
- 6 February: The SPLA stated it had launched bombardments against Moroccan positions in the Gararat Lahdid and Gararat Achadida regions, in Farsia sector.
- 7 February: The SPLA stated it had attacked Moroccan forces positioned in The Rus Asabti and Guerat Uld Blal regions in the Mahbes sector, as well as the special intervention group's general headquarters of the 47th Battalion, in the Um Dagan region, Um Dagan sector.
- 8 February: The SPLA stated it had launched bombardments against Moroccan forces in the areas of Udey Damràn and Laagad, both in the Mahbes sector.
- 10 April: Moroccan forces reportedly killed three Algerian citizens in an airstrike on a truck convoy close to Ain Ben Tili, Mauritania.
- 11 February: The SPLA stated it had attacked Moroccan forces positioned in the regions of Ajbeilat Albid, Lemsamir, Gararat Al-Arabi, Gasbat Achuhada and Rus Asabti, in the sectors of Guelta, Atweizegui and Mahbes, respectively.
- 12 February: The SPLA stated it had launched bombardments against Moroccan positions in the regions of Fadrat Al-Mars, north of Galb Dirit, Al-Ariya and Amheibas At-tadrib, in the Hauza and Mahbes sectors, respectively.
- 13 February: The SPLA stated it had launched bombardments against Moroccan positions in the Gararat Al-Firsik and Udei Adamran regions, in the Mahbes sector.
- 14 September: According to Mauritanian media, two Mauritanian gold miners were killed in a Moroccan drone strike in Western Sahara.

=== 2023 ===
In 2023 the SPLA stated that it has continued to launch daily attacks and bombardments against Moroccan positions along the berm.

- 1 September: A Moroccan drone strike killed 5 Polisario members in Al Mahbes area, including head of the sixth military region, Abba Ali Hamudi. The Sahrawi Arab Democratic Republic declared three days of national mourning.
- 23 October: The SPLA stated that it launched bombardments against Moroccan positions in Al-Akkad area.
- 28 October: The Polisario Front claimed responsibility for four explosions that struck the Moroccan-controlled city of Smara in three neighborhoods, damaging two houses, killing one and injuring three others, two of whom are in critical conditions. In a press release by the Sahara Press Service, the Polisario Front said "The attacks of the SPLA (the Sahrawi People's Liberation Army) targeting the entrenchments of the Moroccan occupation forces continue, inflicting heavy losses in lives and equipment along the wall of shame." Al-Yaoum 24 website said that the explosions were caused by Polisario attacks launched from the Tifariti region. Morocco opened investigations into the series of explosions.
- 5 November: Two rockets fired by the Polisario Front landed in open areas, up to 4 km from the Smara airport.
- 14 November: The SADR MoD stated that the SPLA carried out more than 3,457 military actions and targeted more than 922 sites since the start of the war.
- 24 and 25 December: On the evening of both days a total of 7 rockets were launched by the SPLA towards locations ranging from 900m to 2 km from the Awsard UN team site, near the south of the wall.
- 31 December: A Moroccan official stated that 4 individuals were killed, one was injured and 3 vehicles were blown up after three aerial attacks carried by the Royal Moroccan Army in the Miyek area. The next day a MINURSO team verified that 3 vehicles were destroyed observed the remains of a body

=== 2024 ===
- 14 March: MINURSO reported a firing incident allegedly by the Polisario Front.
- 17 March: MINURSO reported a firing incident allegedly by the Polisario Front.
- 19 March: Moroccan army airstrike in Bir Lahlou, the army claimed killing two and injuring one individual.
- 1 April: Moroccan army airstrike in Mijek.
- 4 April: MINURSO reported a firing incident allegedly by the Polisario Front.
- 5 April: MINURSO reported a firing incident allegedly by the Polisario Front and a Moroccan army airstrike in Mijek.
- 13 May: MINURSO reported a firing incident allegedly by the Polisario Front.

As of 13 May 2024, the SPLA continues to claim deadly and regular attacks on Moroccan military positions near the berm, and that the fighting has extended to the Moroccan interior. An April 2024 report by the International Crisis Group summarizing the conflict notes that Moroccan foreign minister Nasser Bourita acknowledges ongoing hostilities.

- 2 June: MINURSO reported a firing incident allegedly by the Polisario Front.
- 6 July: MINURSO reported a firing incident allegedly by the Polisario Front near Mahbas.
- 15 October: Three civilian deaths were confirmed by MINURSO after an artillery attack by the Moroccan Army.
- 9 November: A shooting was reported in Mahbes while there was a commemoration of the Green March, no casualties were reported.
- 11 November: MINURSO observed the remains of four rockets 350m away from a Moroccan Army unit.

=== 2025 ===
- 6 April: A 155mm projectile shot by the Royal Moroccan Army fell 2 km away from Tifariti. There were no casualties or material damages reported.
- 16 May: A Moroccan drone stuck a vehicle and killing two miners.
- 27 June: Four rockets launched from the east of the berm exploded 200m from a MINURSO site in Smara. There were no casualties.

Between 1-10-2024 and 30-9-2025 the Moroccan drone strikes killed 21 Polisario soldiers and injured 7. Most attacks happened near Mijek. A Polisario commander was also between the killed.

=== 2026 ===
- 2 February: A Moroccan drone strike targeted a vehicle next to an artisanal gold mine 130km north of Mijek without casualities observed.
- 5 May: Two rockets, allegedly from Polisario, struck Smara injuring a civilian and generating material damage. The US condemmned the attack.
- 5 June: An alleged Moroccan drone attack targeted two civilian vehicles with a Saharawi registration plate that were damages in de Mijek area according to MINURSO. There were also reports of a civilian vehicle that had been targeted by 23mm cannon fire that couldn't be verified.
- 7 June: Morocco killed Lehbib Mohamed Abdelaziz, son of the former President of the Sahrawi Republic, Mohamed Abdelaziz, and two other Polisario military officers in a drone attack near the Western Sahara separation barrier.
- 1 November: MINURSO mandate ended without being extended marking the end of the peacekeeping misson. António Guterres asked fot the right to self determination of the Saharawi people to be respected.

== See also ==
- Timeline of the Arab Spring
