= List of airports in Morocco =

Morocco (Arabic: المغرب, al-Maġrib), officially the Kingdom of Morocco, is a country located in North Africa. Morocco has a coast on the Atlantic Ocean that reaches past the Strait of Gibraltar into the Mediterranean. It is bordered by Spain to the north (a water border through the Strait and land borders with three small Spanish exclaves, Ceuta, Melilla, and Peñón de Vélez de la Gomera), Algeria to the east, and Western Sahara to the south. Its capital is Rabat, and its largest city is Casablanca.

As of 2015, Morocco is divided into 12 regions, the highest administrative division of Morocco, with 3 of them that lie partially or completely within the disputed territory of Western Sahara, which has been illegally occupied by Morocco since 1975. The regions are subdivided into a total of 61 second-order administrative divisions, which are prefectures and provinces.

As of 21 November 2017 the new NOS airport was given approval for construction and is expected to be the airport that serves Morocco for generations to come.

== Airports ==
Names shown in bold indicate the airport has scheduled passenger service on commercial airlines.

Location served	Region	ICAO	IATA	Airport name	Coordinates
Public airports
Agadir	Souss-Massa	GMAD	AGA	**Al Massira Airport**	30°19′30″N 9°24′47″W
Al Hoceima	Tangier-Tétouan-Al Hoceima	GMTA	AHU	**Cherif Al Idrissi Airport**	35°10′37″N 3°50′22″W
Ben Slimane	Casablanca-Settat	GMMB	GMD	Ben Slimane Airport	33°39′20″N 7°13′17″W
Beni Mellal	Beni Mellal-Khenifra	GMMD	BEM	**Beni Mellal Airport**	32°24′00″N 6°19′00″W
Bouarfa	Oriental	GMFB	UAR	Bouarfa Airport	32°30′52″N 1°58′42″W
Casablanca	Casablanca-Settat	GMMC	CAS	~~Anfa Airport~~ (closed)	33°33′25″N 7°39′38″W
Casablanca	Casablanca-Settat	GMMN	CMN	**Mohammed V International Airport**	33°22′02″N 7°35′23″W
Casablanca	Casablanca-Settat	GMMT		Tit Mellil Airport	33°35′40″N 7°27′50″W
El Jadida	Casablanca-Settat	GMMJ		~~El Jadida Airport~~ (closed)	33°14′00″N 8°31′15″W
Errachidia	Draa-Tafilalet	GMFK	ERH	**Moulay Ali Cherif Airport**	31°56′51″N 4°23′54″W
Essaouira (Mogador)	Marrakesh-Safi	GMMI	ESU	**Mogador Airport**	31°23′51″N 9°40′54″W
Fez	Fez-Meknes	GMFF	FEZ	**Saïss Airport**	33°55′38″N 4°58′41″W
Fez	Fez-Meknes	GMFU		~~Sefrou Airport~~ (closed)	34°00′20″N 4°57′56″W
Guelmim	Guelmin-Oued Noun	GMAG	GLN	**Guelmim Airport**	29°01′00″N 10°04′04″W
Ifrane	Fez-Meknes	GMFI		Ifrane Airport	33°30′19″N 5°09′10″W
Marrakesh	Marrakesh-Safi	GMMX	RAK	**Marrakesh Menara Airport**	31°36′25″N 8°02′11″W
Nador	Oriental	GMMW	NDR	**Nador Airport** (Al Aroui Airport)	34°59′20″N 3°01′42″W
Ouarzazate	Drâa-Tafilalet	GMMZ	OZZ	**Ouarzazate Airport**	30°56′21″N 6°54′34″W
Ouezzane	Tangier-Tétouan-Al Hoceima	GMFA		Ouezzane Airport	34°47′35″N 5°38′02″W
Oujda	Oriental	GMFO	OUD	**Angads Airport**	34°47′14″N 1°55′26″W
Rabat / Salé	Rabat-Salé-Kénitra	GMME	RBA	**Rabat-Salé Airport** (First Royal Air Force Base)	34°03′05″N 6°45′05″W
Safi	Marrakesh-Safi	GMMS	~~SFI~~	~~Safi Airport~~ (closed)	32°16′23″N 9°14′13″W
Sidi Ifni	Guelmim-Oued Noun	GMMF	SII	~~Sidi Ifni Airport~~ (closed)	29°22′08″N 10°10′49″W
Tangier (Tanger)	Tangier-Tétouan-Al Hoceima	GMTT	TNG	**Ibn Battouta Airport**	35°43′37″N 5°55′01″W
Tan Tan	Guelmim-Oued Noun	GMAT	TTA	**Tan Tan Airport** (Plage Blanche Airport)	28°26′54″N 11°09′41″W
Taroudannt	Souss-Massa	GMMO		Taroudannt Airport	30°30′09″N 8°49′25″W
Taza	Fez-Meknes	GMFZ		Taza Airport	34°13′55″N 3°57′0″W
Tétouan	Tangier-Tétouan-Al Hoceima	GMTN	TTU	**Sania Ramel Airport**	35°35′40″N 5°19′12″W
Zagora	Drâa-Tafilalet	GMAZ	OZG	**Zagora Airport**	30°16′00″N 5°51′26″W
Military airports
Meknes	Fez-Meknes	GMFM	MEK	Bassatine Air Base (Second Royal Air Force Base)	33°52′45″N 5°30′54″W
Kenitra	Rabat-Salé-Kénitra	GMMY	NNA	Kenitra Air Base (Third Royal Air Force Base)	34°17′56″N 6°35′45″W
Sidi Slimane	Rabat-Salé-Kénitra	GMSL		Sidi Slimane Air Base (Fifth Royal Air Force Base)	34°13′50″N 6°03′01″W
Agadir	Souss-Massa	GMAA		Inezgane Airport	30°22′52″N 9°32′46″W

== See also ==
- List of airports by ICAO code: G#Morocco
- List of airports in Western Sahara
- Royal Moroccan Air Force
- Transport in Morocco
- Wikipedia: WikiProject Aviation/Airline destination lists: Africa#Morocco
