= Loukili =

Loukili is a surname. Notable people with the surname include:

- Ghouti Loukili (born 1973), Algerian footballer
- Karim Loukili (born 1997), Moroccan footballer
- Mohsine Loukili (born 1978), Moroccan novelist
