= Oum Dreyga Airport =

Airport in Western Sahara

- IATA: none; ICAO: none

Summary
- Airport type: Public
- Serves: Oum Dreyga
- Elevation AMSL: 930 ft / 283 m
- Coordinates: 24°05′30″N 13°18′40″W

Map
- Location of the airport in Western Sahara

Runways
Direction	Length		Surface
Direction	ft	m	Surface
02/20	6,630	2,020	Sand
- Source: Google Maps

Oum Dreyga Airport is an airport serving Oum Dreyga in Western Sahara.

== See also ==
- Transport in Western Sahara
- List of airports in Western Sahara
