= Transport in Western Sahara =

Transport in Western Sahara is very limited by sea, road and air with camels being the primary means of transportation in the desert area. Road transport by buses remain the major mode of transportation. The longest conveyor belt in the world is 100 kilometres (62 mi) long, from the phosphate mines of Bu Craa to the coast south of Laayoune. The belt moves about 2,000 metric tons of rock containing phosphate every hour from the mines to El-Aaiun, where it is loaded and shipped.

Portions of Western Sahara were a Spanish Colony until 1975 as the last colonial province in Africa. A war erupted between those countries and the Sahrawi national liberation movement, the Polisario Front, which proclaimed the Sahrawi Arab Democratic Republic (SADR) with a government in exile in Tindouf, Algeria. Mauritania withdrew in 1979, and Morocco eventually secured control of most of the territory, including all the major cities and natural resources. A UN brokered ceasefire was implemented from 1991 between Polisario and Moroccan forces.

The world's longest cargo train, the Mauritania Railway cargo train, crosses the southeastern corner of Western Sahara for a short distance. Transit through Western Sahara was disrupted during the war between Polisario and Moroccan forces before the ceasefire was implemented in 1991.

== Background ==
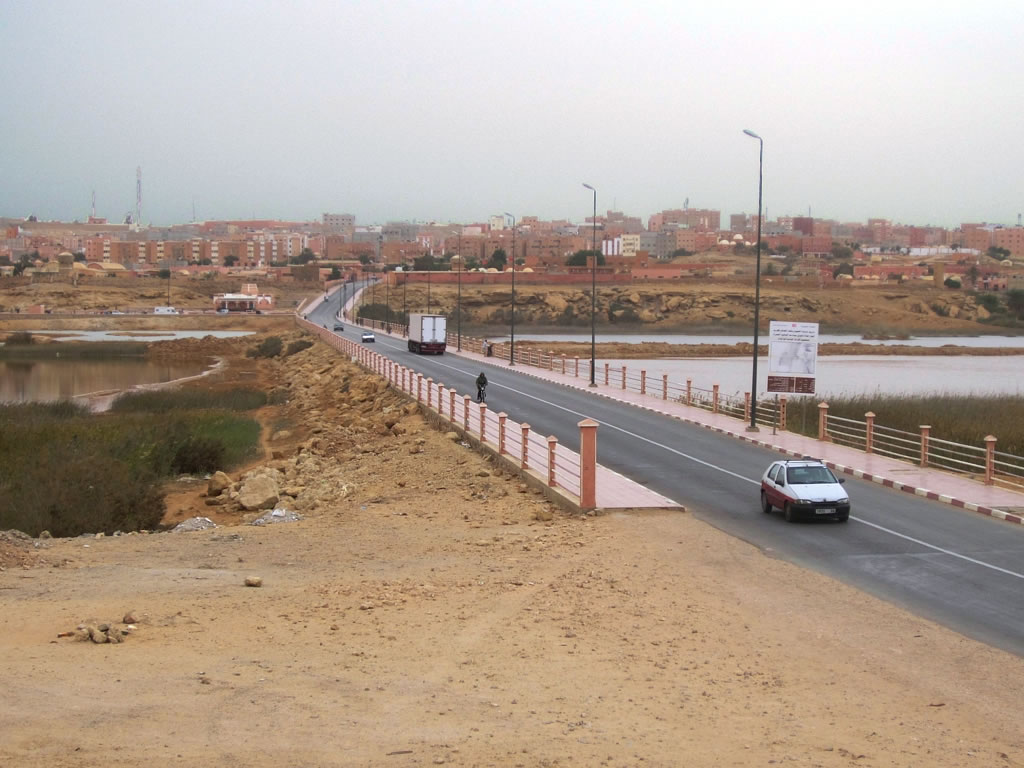
The road into El Aaiún from the north crosses the Saguia el-Hamra, a seasonal river

Portions of Western Sahara were a Spanish Colony till 1975 as the last colonial province in Africa. A war erupted between those countries and the Sahrawi national liberation movement, the Polisario Front, which proclaimed the Sahrawi Arab Democratic Republic (SADR) with a government in exile in Tindouf, Algeria. Mauritania withdrew in 1979, and Morocco eventually secured control of most of the territory, including all the major cities and natural resources.

Polisario was formed in 1973 to fight for the rights of Saharawi Arab African People. Polisario attacked Moroccan positions many times and have retaliated. Continued war was waged between Polisario and Morocco over prominence in the region backed by Algeria for Polisario and US, France and Saudi Arabia for Morocco. Polisario were successful in cutting the transport of Phosphorus across Western Sahara to the Atlantic Coast. The transport infrastructure of the region, including the border towns of Morocco was affected during the wars.

== Road transport ==
Western Sahara has no rail service, with the exception of a 5-kilometre (3.1 mi) section of the Mauritania Railway; which (since the closure of the Choum Tunnel), cuts across the extreme south-eastern corner of the territory. The rail-route is considered the world's longest cargo train covering a distance of 437 mi (703 km). Passengers with tickets ride in cramped cars while many illegal passengers, sometimes with livestock, ride on top of freight cars.

There are only 6,200 kilometres (3,900 mi) of roads, of which 1,126 kilometres (700 mi) are metalled. A small network of highways provides limited ground travel connections. N1 highway is a major roadway traversing along the Atlantic coastline of the country. There are a few roads in the north and only two roads in the south that branch off of N1. All other roads are local ones in the various cities and towns. Off road driving is considered dangerous since there are "thousands of unexploded mines" in the area. Highway Road plans in the region started by Algeria have been used to increase its own influence in the region. There are only 4 companies licensed to use buses in Western Sahara which are: CTM, Supratours, Satas and Sat; CTM and Supratours buses have daily service from Dakhla to Marrakech via Laayoune and Agadir.

== Rail transport ==
Since the closure of the Choum Tunnel, a 5 km (3.1 mi) section of Mauritania Railway cuts through the Polisario Front-controlled part of the Western Sahara (21.354867°N 13.012644°W).

== Ports ==
The major port in Western Sahara is Ad Dakhla - small docking facility (Port Marchand Lassarga/Port-Îlot) located in a shelter bay south of the airport, Cabo Bojador - small port with fishing boats store inland and Laayoune (El Aaiun) - major deep water port facility; used by vessels carrying phosphate, large fishing vessels and military patrol boats. The longest conveyor belt in the world is 100 kilometres (62 mi) long, from the phosphate mines of Bu Craa to the coast south of Laayoune.

The belt moves about 2,000 metric tons of rock containing phosphate every hour from the mines to El-Aaiun, where it is loaded and shipped.

== Air transport ==
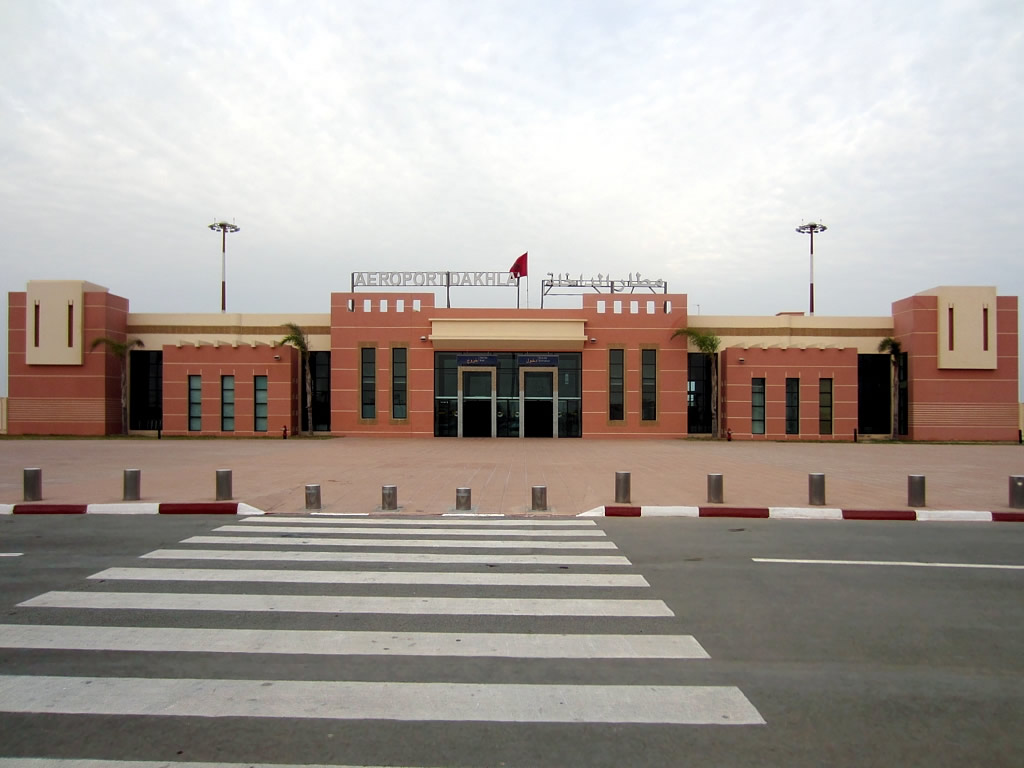
Dakhla Airport

There are six airfields, three with paved runways and three unpaved surfaces, and one helipad (military in Cape Bojador). Hassan I Airport, serving El Aaiún (Laâyoune), is an international airport, but the carriers at the airport connect only to regional destinations (to Morocco or the Canary Islands). Dakhla Airport is located in Dakhla and has commercial operational flights. Smara Airport in Smara and La Güera Airport serving La Güera are other smaller airports in Western Sahara.

== See also ==
- List of airports in Western Sahara

== Sources ==
- CIA World Factbook (2010).
