= Taroudant Airport =

- IATA: none; ICAO: GMMO

Summary
- Airport type: Public
- Serves: Taroudant
- Elevation AMSL: 869 ft / 265 m
- Coordinates: 30°30′09″N 8°49′25″W

Map

Runways
Direction	Length		Surface
Direction	m	ft	Surface
08/26	1,477	4,846	Unpaved
- Source: Google Maps GCM

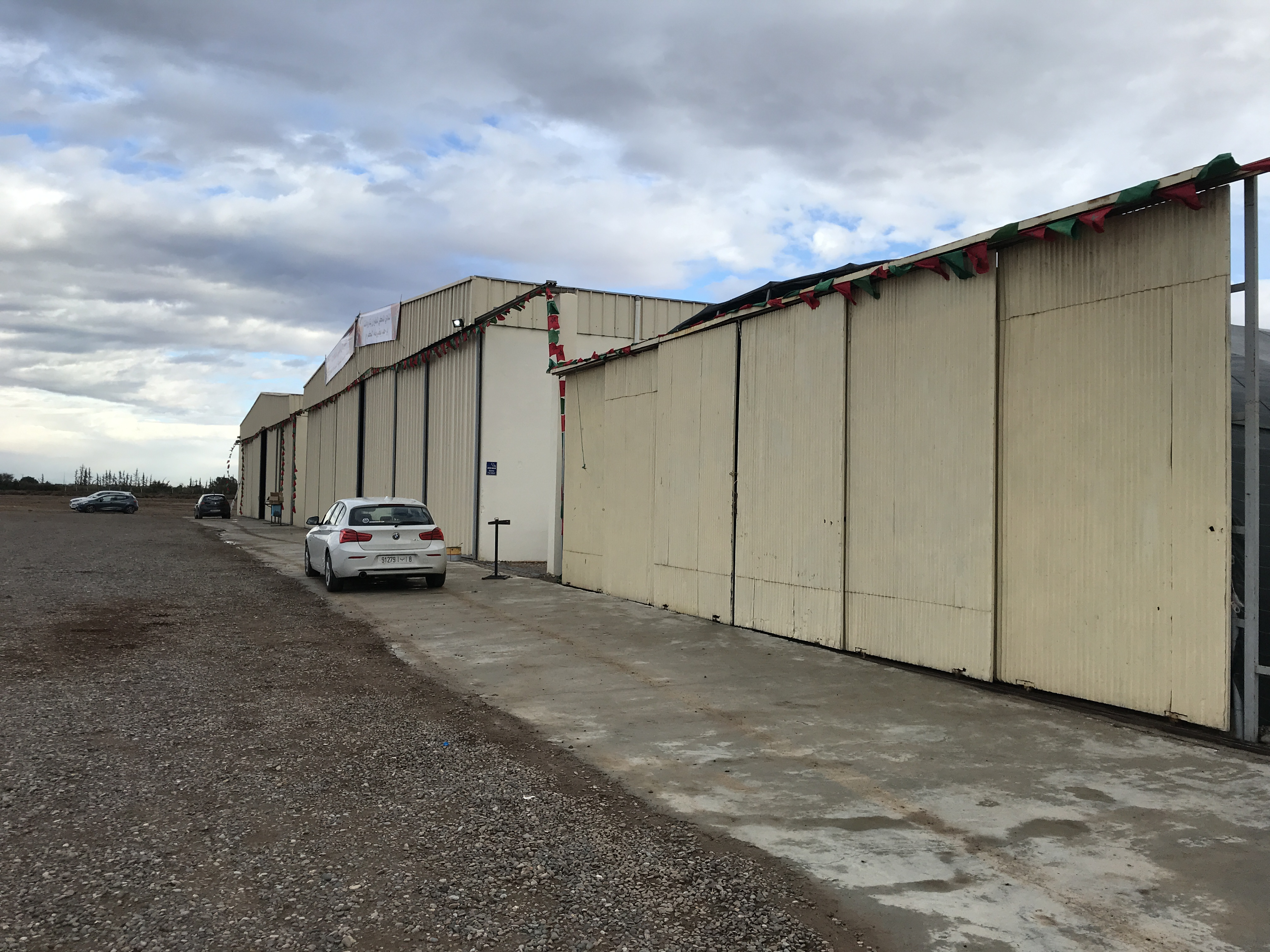
Aircraft hangars at Taroudant Airport

Taroudant Airport (ICAO: GMMO) is an airport serving Taroudant, Morocco. The airport is mainly used for skydiving; the airport has a school to teach skydiving skills and also has a small hangar for the planes used for this sport. The local authorities are planning to invest more in the airport such as paving the current runway to encourage tourism and skydiving in the city.

== See also ==
- Transport in Morocco
- List of airports in Morocco
