= Ahmed Bouzfour =

Moroccan writer

Ahmed Bouzfour (Arabic: أحمد بوزفور) (born 1940s, in Taza) is a Moroccan novelist.

== Biography ==
Born in the early 1940s near to Taza, Bouzfour received his primary education and learned the Qur'an in a Quranic school. He then studied at the University of Al Qaraouiyine (Arabic: القرويين) in Fès, where he completed his high school studies and obtained a baccalauréat in 1966. After that, he was arrested and incarcerated during three months for his political activism.

Bouzfour continued his studies in the "Faculty of Humanities and Human Science" in Mohammed V University, in Rabat, where he obtained a licence (Academic degree) of Arabic literature, then, in 1972, a master in modern Moroccan literature.

His first novella, Yas'alounaka âni al-qatl (يسألونك عن القتل) was published in 1971 in Al-Alam (العلم), a Moroccan newspaper belonging to the Istiqlal Party.

== Works ==
- Ta'abbaṭa shiâran (تأبط شعرا)
- Three collections of novellas :
  - An-naḍar fi al-wajh al-âaziz (النظر في الوجه العزيز) in 1983
  - Al-Ġābir Al-Ḍāhir (الغابر الظاهر) en 1987
  - Sayyād al-Naâam (صياد النعام) en 1993
- Dīwān as-sindibād (ديوان السندباد)
- Az-zarāfa al-mushtaâila (الزرافة المشتعلة): Points of view about Moroccan modern stories

== See also ==
- Short story
- Moroccan literature
- Arabic literature
