= Ouezzane Airport =

Airport in Morocco

- IATA: none; ICAO: GMFA

Summary
- Airport type: Public
- Serves: Ouezzane, Morocco
- Elevation AMSL: 568 ft / 173 m
- Coordinates: 34°47′35″N 5°38′02″W

Map

Runways
Direction	Length		Surface
Direction	m	ft	Surface
18/36	1,207	3,960	Grass
- Source: Google Maps SkyVector

Ouezzane Airport (ICAO: GMFA) was an airport serving Ouezzane, Morocco. The airport is 5 kilometres (3.1 mi) west of the city.

There is rising terrain southeast and southwest of the airport.

The Sidi Slimane VOR-DME (Ident: SMN) is located 39.0 nautical miles (72.2 km) south-southwest of the airport.

== See also ==
- Transport in Morocco
- List of airports in Morocco
