= El Jadida Airport =

Defunct airport in Morocco

El Jadida Airport (ICAO: GMMJ) was an airport serving the city of El Jadida, Morocco.

Google Earth Historical Imagery from 4/28/2002 shows a 1,524 metres (5,000 ft) grass runway 04/22. 07/13/2005 image shows a highway cut through, and the current satellite image shows the area covered with streets and apartment blocks.

The surface of the airport measured 92ha and was transformed in 2008 into a real-estate development project by the firm CGI (subsidiary of the CDG fund) and a Marjane hypermarket was opened there in 2013.

== See also ==
- Transport in Morocco
- List of airports in Morocco
