= Taza Airport =

- IATA: none; ICAO: GMFZ

Summary
- Airport type: Public
- Serves: Taza
- Elevation AMSL: 1,890 ft (580 m)
- Coordinates: 34°13′55″N 3°57′0″W

Map
- Location within Morocco

Runways
Direction	Length		Surface
Direction	m	ft	Surface
08/26	1,695	5,561	Asphalt
- Source: Google Maps SkyVector

Taza Airport (ICAO: GMFZ) is an airport serving the city of Taza, Morocco. The airport is 3 kilometres (2 mi) east of the city.

It currently serves small airplanes of less than 5,700 kg and is mainly used by the fire-fighters brigade for forest fires and pesticide distribution. No commercial passenger or cargo airlines serve it.

The Saiss VOR-DME (Ident: FES) is located 56.0 nautical miles (104 km) west-southwest of the airport.

== See also ==
- Transport in Morocco
- List of airports in Morocco
