= Postage stamps and postal history of La Agüera =

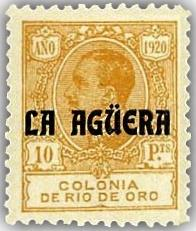
A 1920 stamp of La Aguera

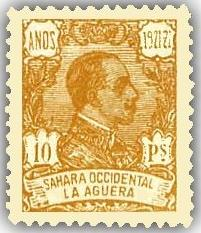
A 1922 stamp of La Aguera

In June 1920, Spain issued postage stamps of its existing colony Río de Oro overprinted "LA AGÜERA", and followed those up in 1922 with a series portraying King Alfonso XIII and inscribed "SAHARA OCCIDENTAL / LA AGÜERA". These were superseded in 1924 by stamps of Spanish Sahara, as La Güera was incorporated to the Spanish colony of Rio de Oro. The stamps of La Agüera are not rare, typically costing about US$1 either used or unused, but because of the small population (probably fewer than 1,000 persons) and short period of validity, non-philatelic uses on cover are likely to be hard to find.

== Sources ==
- Stanley Gibbons Ltd: various catalogues
- Encyclopaedia of Postal Authorities
- Rossiter, Stuart & John Flower. The Stamp Atlas. London: Macdonald, 1986. ISBN 0-356-10862-7
