= Battle of Al Mahbes (1979) =

Battle during the Western Sahara War

- Part of the Western Sahara War
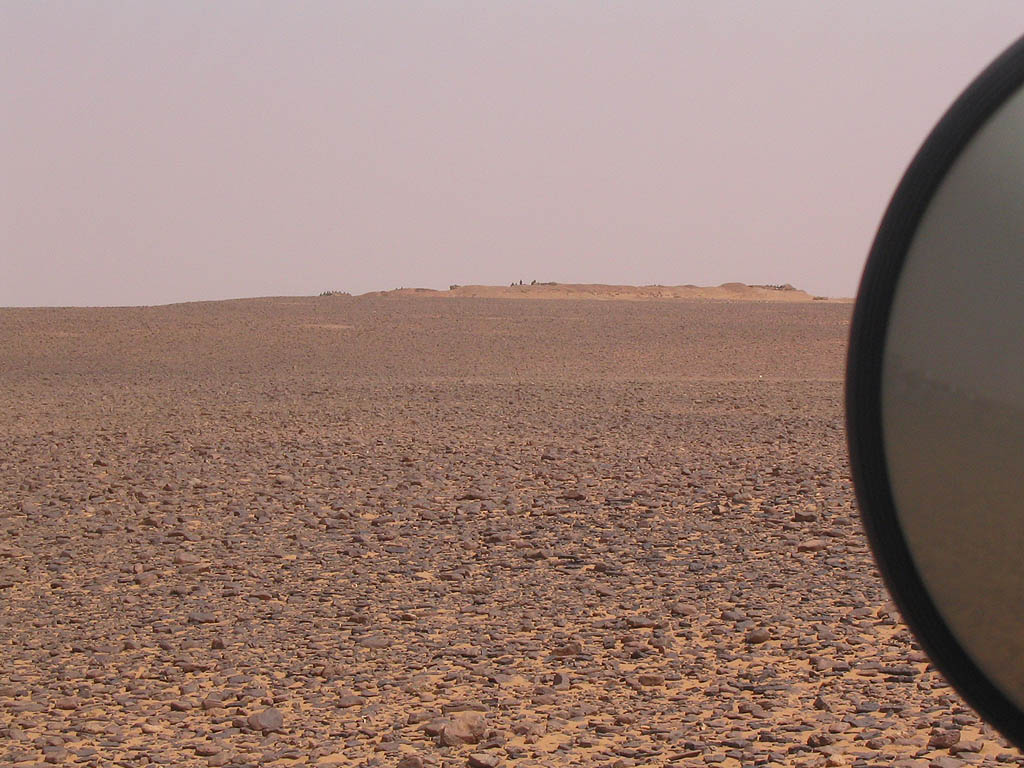
Date	14 October 1979
Location	Al Mahbes, Western Sahara 27.416°N 9.051°W
Result	Sahrawi victory

Belligerents
Sahrawi Arab Democratic Republic; Polisario Front	Morocco

Casualties and losses
Unknown	At least 132 Killed; 150 wounded 53 captured
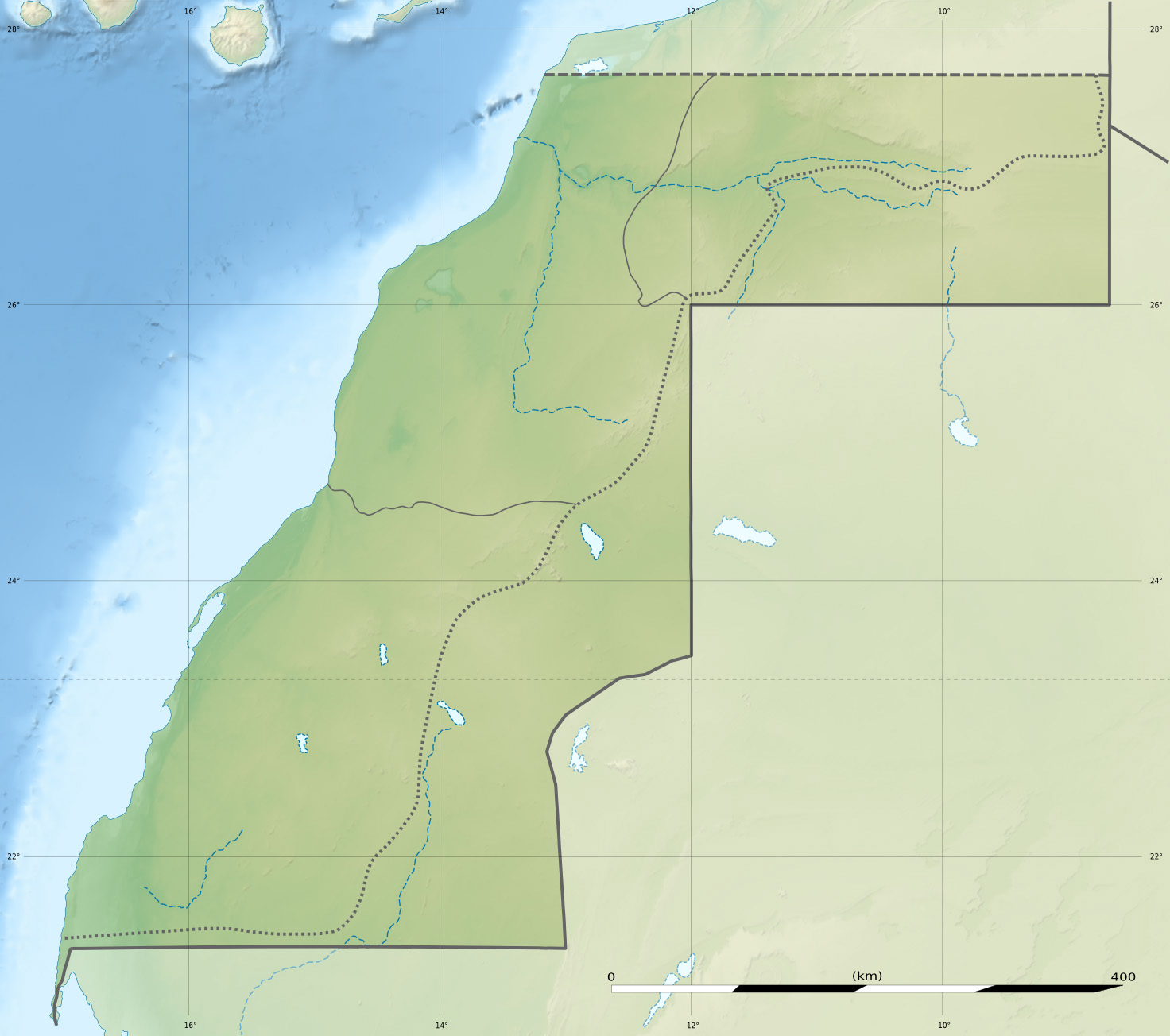
- Location within Western Sahara

The Battle of Al Mahbes was fought on 14 October 1979 during the war in Western Sahara. The Polisario Front annihilated a battalion of the Royal Moroccan Armed Forces.

== Background ==
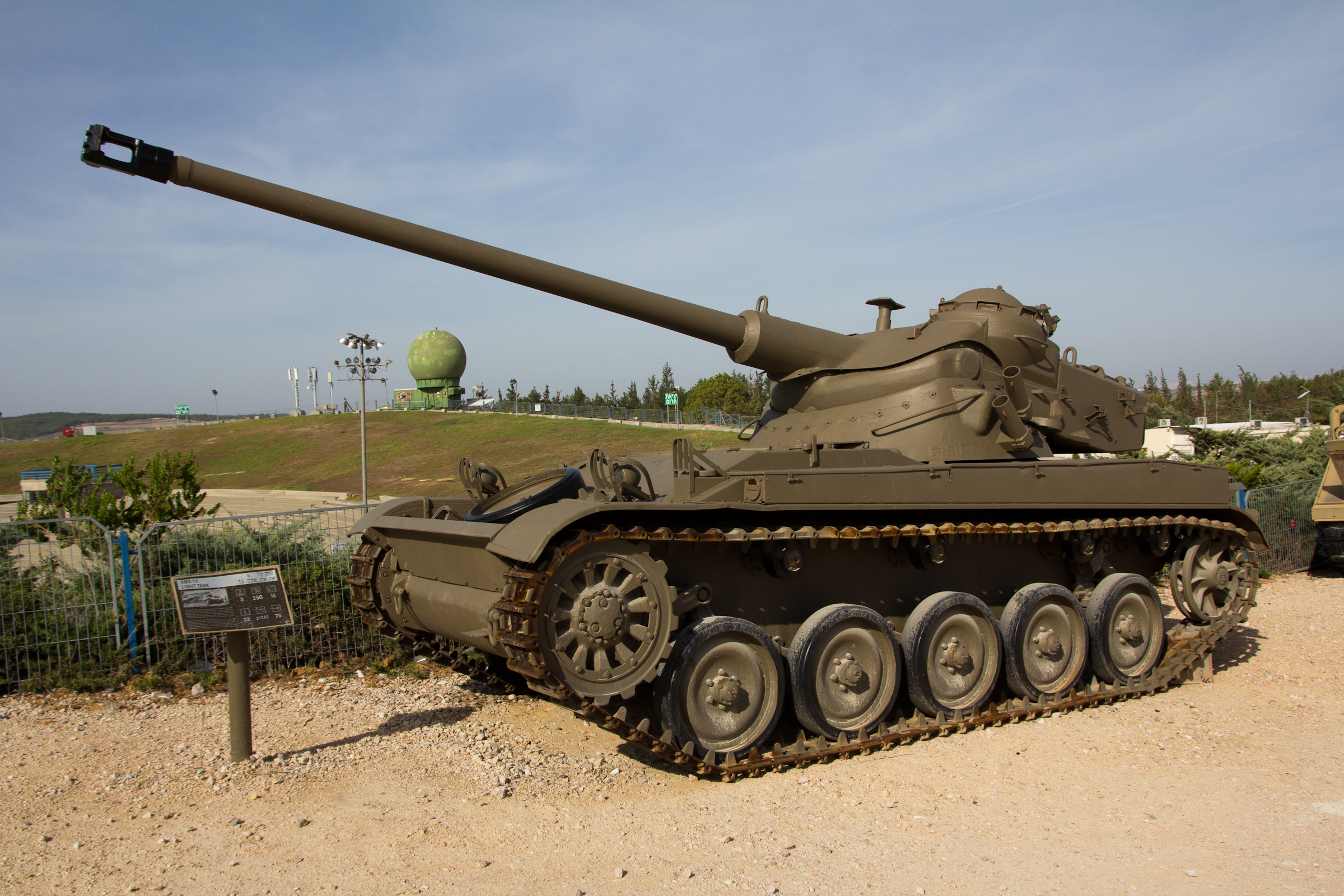
An AMX-13 tank (here in a museum in Israel), identical to those used by the Moroccan garrison.

The town of Al Mahbes was defended by a battalion of the 14th motorized infantry regiment of the Moroccan army, about 780 men.

The garrison included an artillery battery, BGM-71 TOW anti-tank missiles and an armoured squadron, including 8 AMX-13 tanks (4 of which were present on the day of the attack).

After the attack on Smara, the Polisario forces who retreated to their bases in Algeria decided to attack the garrison of Al Mahbes.

Around ten Polisario units took part in the attack, i.e. around 1,200 men.

== Battle ==
The attack was launched at 6:00 a.m. Around noon, all Moroccan defensive lines were taken by the Polisario, and the last Moroccan resistance was broken at around 4 pm. The Moroccan Air Force intervened. During the day of the 15th, the Saharawis pursued the fleeing Moroccans and blocked Moroccan reinforcements. Part of the garrison, including its commander Captain Mohamed Sakka, managed to withdraw to the town of Zag. Both sides are said to have run out of ammunition.

== Casualties and consequences ==
According to the Polisario, 767 Moroccan soldiers were killed. Journalists who came to the scene counted 132 Moroccan corpses. The Polisario also presented 53 prisoners to journalists. According to Moroccan reports, 20% of the soldiers of the garrison were killed and the number of wounded was even higher.

Morocco claimed 350 Polisario were killed and 75 vehicles were destroyed.

400 tonnes of weapons of all kinds, including a BGM-71 TOW anti-tank missile, were captured by the Polisario Front following this attack.
