= Mohsine Loukili =

Moroccan novelist

- Born: 17 January 1978 (age 47); Taza, Morocco
- Education: BA in history and civilization
- Occupation(s): Writer, novelist
- Years active: 2009–present
- Awards: won the first place in the Ghassan Kanafani Award for Narration in 2016

Mohsine Loukili (Arabic: محسن الوكيلي, born 17 January 1978) is a Moroccan novelist. He published more than 5 books and won several awards including Ghassan Kanafani Award for Narration in 2016.

== Education and career ==
Mohsin Loukili was born in Taza, Morocco, on 17 January 1978. He holds a BA in History and Civilization. He worked as a teacher and then became the manager for a documentation and information center. Loukili started his literary career with writing short stories and publishing them in several Arab magazine such as the Emirati magazine "Al-Rafid", "Al-Rai", and "Al-Nahar". He published his first collection of short stories "Dawn of Wrath" in 2009, then his first novel "Aab Winds" in 2013, published by the Sharjah Department of Culture, which won the Sharjah Award for Arab Creativity at its 16th session in the same year. Loukili published four collections of short story, three novels, and one play. He has also won several awards, including the Sharjah Award for Arab Creativity for his novel "Aab Winds" in 2013, and the Naji Al Numan Award for Literary Creativit for his short collection "Hayy Al-Abeereen in 2011. In 2017, his story “Rayah Al-Shirky" was nominated in the long list of the Sheikh Zayed Book Award.

== Works ==
=== Short-story collections ===
- "Fajr Al Ghadab", 2009
- "Hai Al Abereen", 2011
- "Teh", 2016
- "Maout Min Zawaia Al Mutadida", 2017

=== Novels ===
- "Riyah Abb", 2016
- "Reeh Al Sharki", 2016
- "Shathaia", 2016

=== Plays ===
- "Hamalat Al Awjah", 2017

== Awards ==
- 2011: won Naji Al-Numan Award for Literary Creativity for his short-story collection "Hayy Al-Abereen".
- 2012: won Ahmed Bouzfour's Award for storytelling at the level of the Arab world for his story "Maout Min Zawaia Al Mutadida"
- 2013: won the Sharjah Award for Arab Creativity in its 16th session for his novel "Riaah Ab".
- 2016: won the first place in the Ghassan Kanafani Award for Narration.
