= Taza =

Taza تازة ⵜⴰⵣⴰ
- city
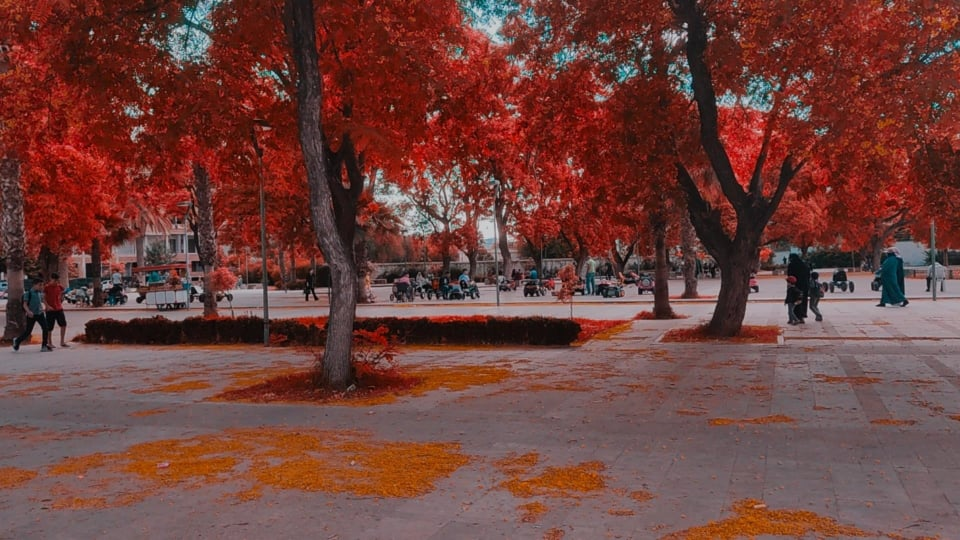
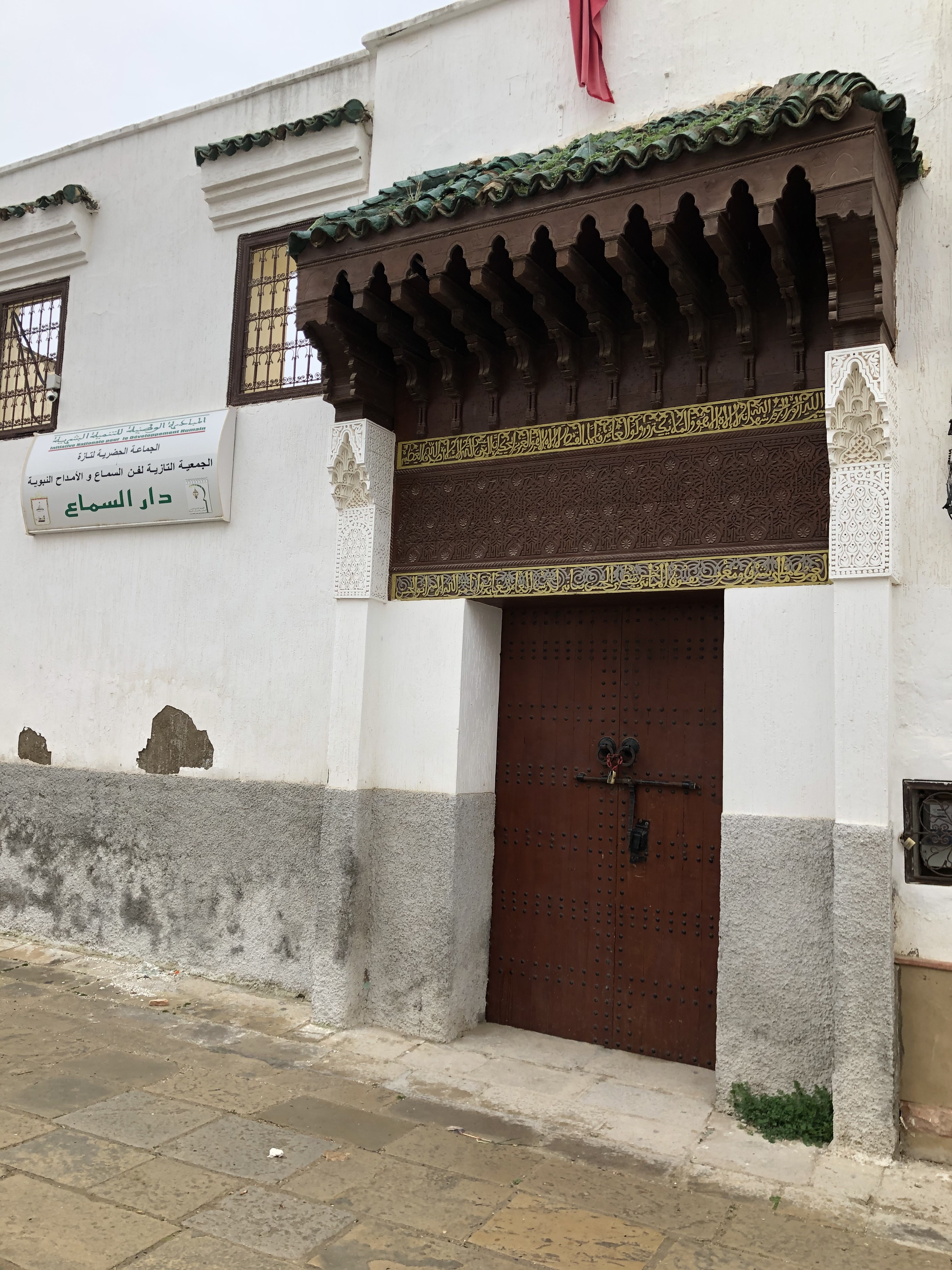
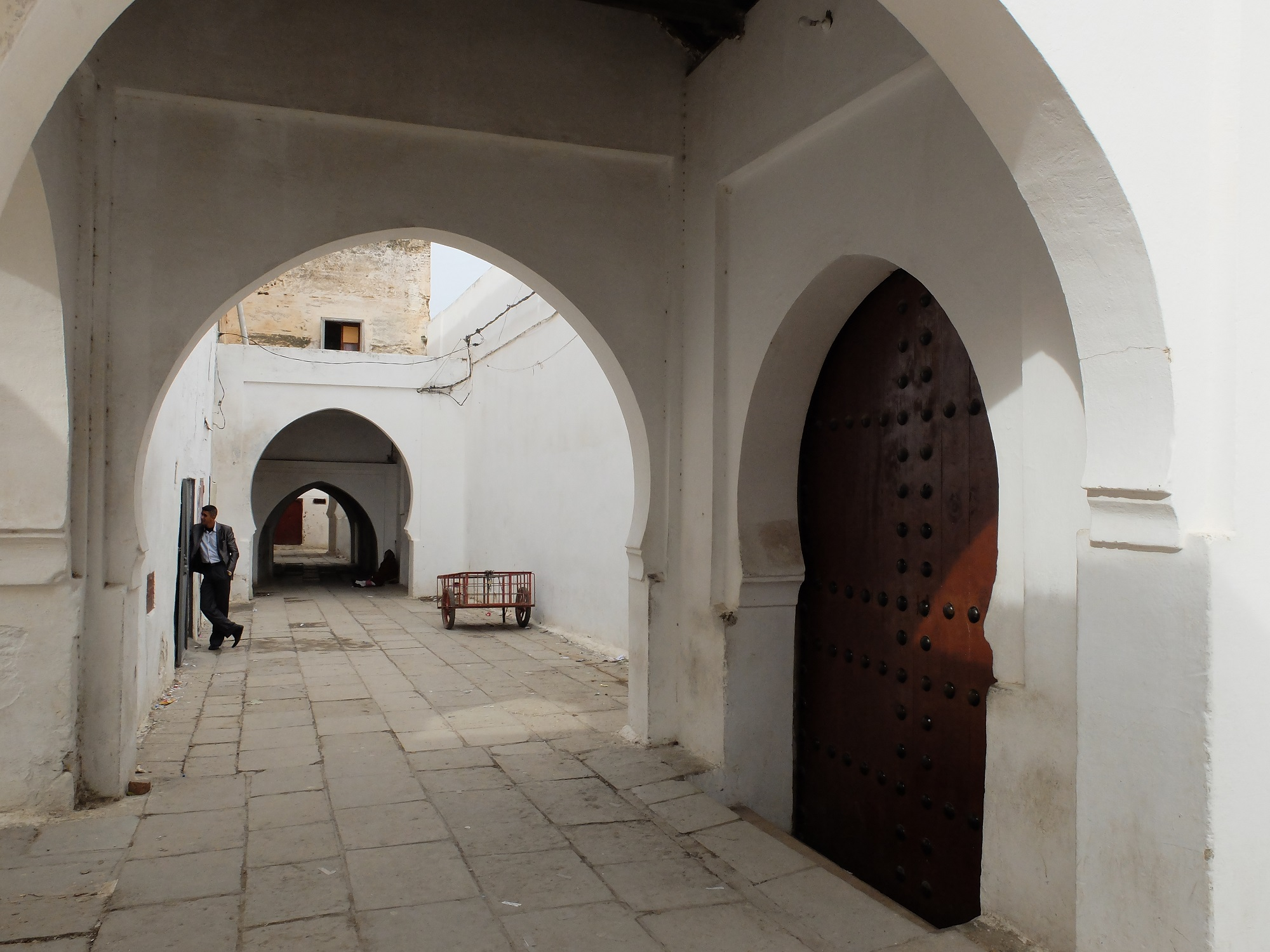
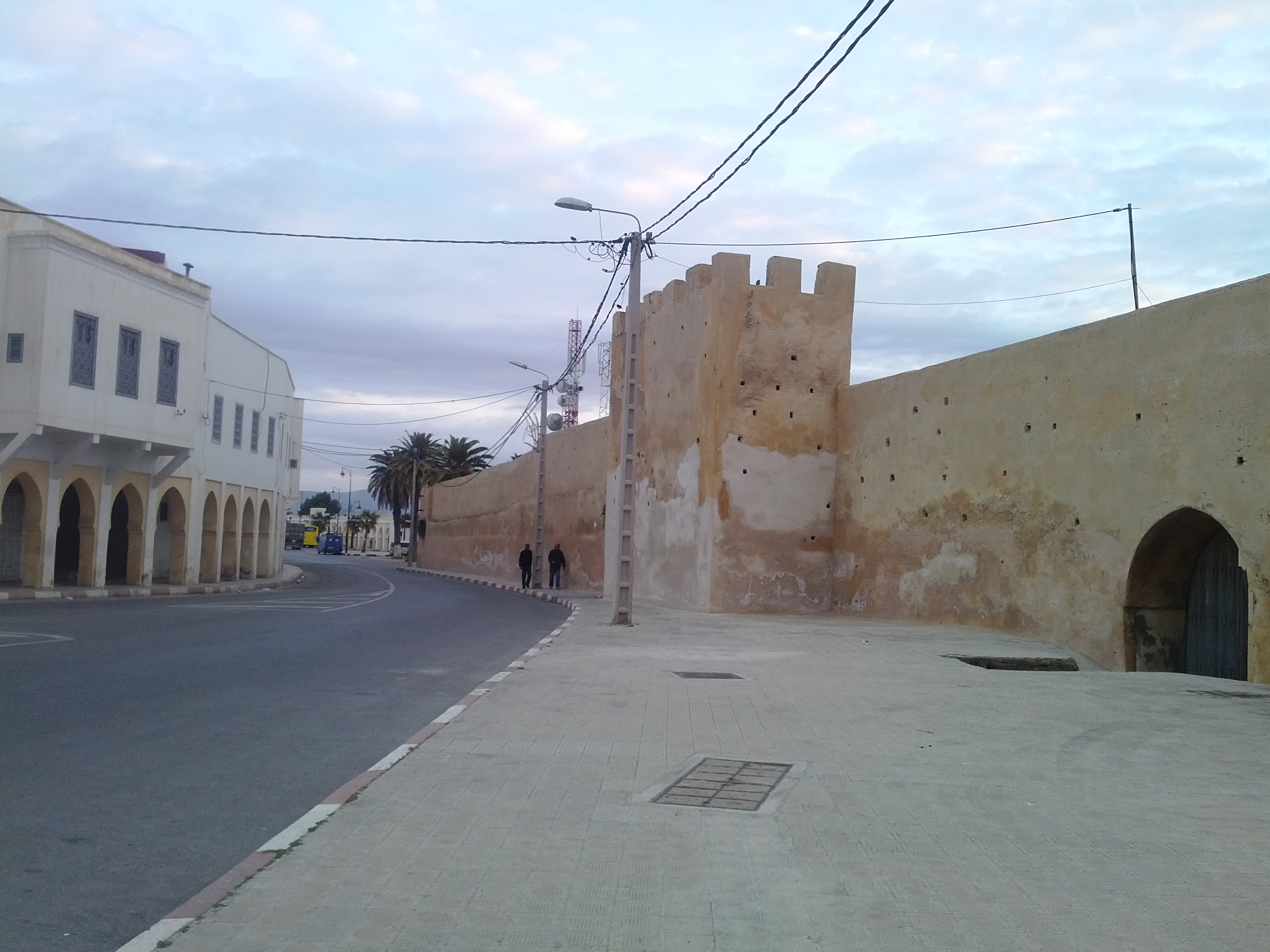
- Interactive map of Taza
- Coordinates: 34°13′N 4°1′W
- Country: Morocco
- Region: Fez-Meknes
- Province: Taza
- Elevation: 510 m (1,670 ft)

Population (2024)
  - Total: 150,763
  - Rank: 24th in Morocco
- Demonym: Tazi
- Time zone: UTC+0 (GMT)

Taza (Arabic: تازة; Standard Moroccan Tamazight: ⵜⴰⵣⴰ) is a city in northern Morocco occupying the corridor between the Rif mountains and Middle Atlas mountains, about 120 km east of Fez and 150 km south of Al Hoceima. It recorded a population of 150,763 in the 2024 Moroccan census and is the capital of Taza Province.

== History ==
Historically Taza was known first as Ribāt Taza (Arabic: رباط تازة), a military camp belonging to the Fatimid state, founded by the local governor Musa ibn Abi'l-Afiya (موسى بن أبي العافية) who was also the leader of the Miknasa. Up to at least the early 20th century, Taza was a considerable trading centre on the route between Fez and the Algerian frontier. Taza as a toponym could be derivative from Tizi (Tamazight for a hill that lies between mountains) which is where it stands up.

Taza was first settled by Miknasa tribesmen, who gave it its name: Miknasa Taza, similar to Miknasa al-Zeitoun (present-day Meknes, another Miknasa settlement). The Almoravid empire took over Taza in 1074. They were replaced by the Almohad empire in 1132. In 1248 the city was captured by the Marinids. Although Taza barred the route of the Turks from Algiers seeking conquest in Morocco, it fell to the French in 1914. The old town has Berber monuments, mosques, and a 14th-century madrasa (Koranic school). Population in 1982 stood at 77,216.

== Geography ==
Taza is located in north-central Morocco, in the south of the Rif region right outside the mountain range on a narrow plain. The city is composed of two formerly separate towns built on separate terraces overlooking a mountain valley. The old-Taza town is at an elevation of 1,919 feet (585 m) above sea level and is surrounded by fortifications; the newer town, established by the French in 1920, is located in a fertile plain at an elevation of 1,460 feet (445 m). Fossil remains indicate that caves in the area were inhabited as early as the Paleolithic Period. One of the most important caves in Morocco, Rhar Chara, is close to Taza. This cave is over 7.6 kilometres long.

The city is located in a mountain pass known as the "Taza Gap", where the Rif mountains and the Middle-Atlas range come together. Through this pass successive waves of invaders moved westward onto the Atlantic coastal plains of north-western Africa.

=== Climate ===
The Köppen-Geiger climate classification system classifies its climate as hot-summer Mediterranean (Csa). Located along the Atlas Mountains, Taza has a seasonal climate, shifting from cool in winter to hot days in summer. Rainfall can reach up to 900 mm per year. The highest temperature ever registered in Taza was 46.4 °C (115.5 °F), on July 23, 2021.

Climate data for Taza (1980–2025)
Month	Jan	Feb	Mar	Apr	May	Jun	Jul	Aug	Sep	Oct	Nov	Dec	Year
Record high °C (°F)	25.2 (77.4)	28.7 (83.7)	31.6 (88.9)	33.5 (92.3)	39.6 (103.3)	44.2 (111.6)	46.4 (115.5)	45.7 (114.3)	44.3 (111.7)	38.5 (101.3)	34.5 (94.1)	26.7 (80.1)	46.4 (115.5)
Mean daily maximum °C (°F)	15.7 (60.3)	17.3 (63.1)	20.1 (68.2)	22.4 (72.3)	27.1 (80.8)	32.5 (90.5)	37.0 (98.6)	36.9 (98.4)	31.2 (88.2)	26.3 (79.3)	19.8 (67.6)	16.5 (61.7)	25.2 (77.4)
Daily mean °C (°F)	10.7 (51.3)	12.1 (53.8)	14.5 (58.1)	16.6 (61.9)	20.6 (69.1)	25.2 (77.4)	29.1 (84.4)	29.3 (84.7)	24.8 (76.6)	20.5 (68.9)	14.8 (58.6)	11.8 (53.2)	19.2 (66.5)
Mean daily minimum °C (°F)	5.6 (42.1)	6.8 (44.2)	8.9 (48.0)	10.8 (51.4)	14.0 (57.2)	17.9 (64.2)	21.2 (70.2)	21.7 (71.1)	18.4 (65.1)	14.6 (58.3)	9.8 (49.6)	7.0 (44.6)	13.1 (55.6)
Record low °C (°F)	−5.3 (22.5)	−3.5 (25.7)	−0.5 (31.1)	1.6 (34.9)	3.8 (38.8)	7.2 (45.0)	11.5 (52.7)	11.7 (53.1)	7.6 (45.7)	4.3 (39.7)	−1.1 (30.0)	−0.1 (31.8)	−5.3 (22.5)
Average precipitation mm (inches)	73.0 (2.87)	71.1 (2.80)	72.6 (2.86)	58.1 (2.29)	27.2 (1.07)	6.0 (0.24)	2.1 (0.08)	5.0 (0.20)	19.9 (0.78)	55.7 (2.19)	79.2 (3.12)	85.3 (3.36)	555.2 (21.86)
Average precipitation days (≥ 1.0 mm)	6.8	6.5	6.4	6.2	4.2	1.3	0.6	1.0	2.6	5.8	6.9	7.2	55.5
Mean monthly sunshine hours	178.3	173.8	203.0	232.1	263.0	291.7	309.2	277.3	225.6	203.4	171.7	162.6	2,691.7
Source 1: World Meteorological Organization (sun, 1981-2010)
Source 2: NOAA

== Sights ==
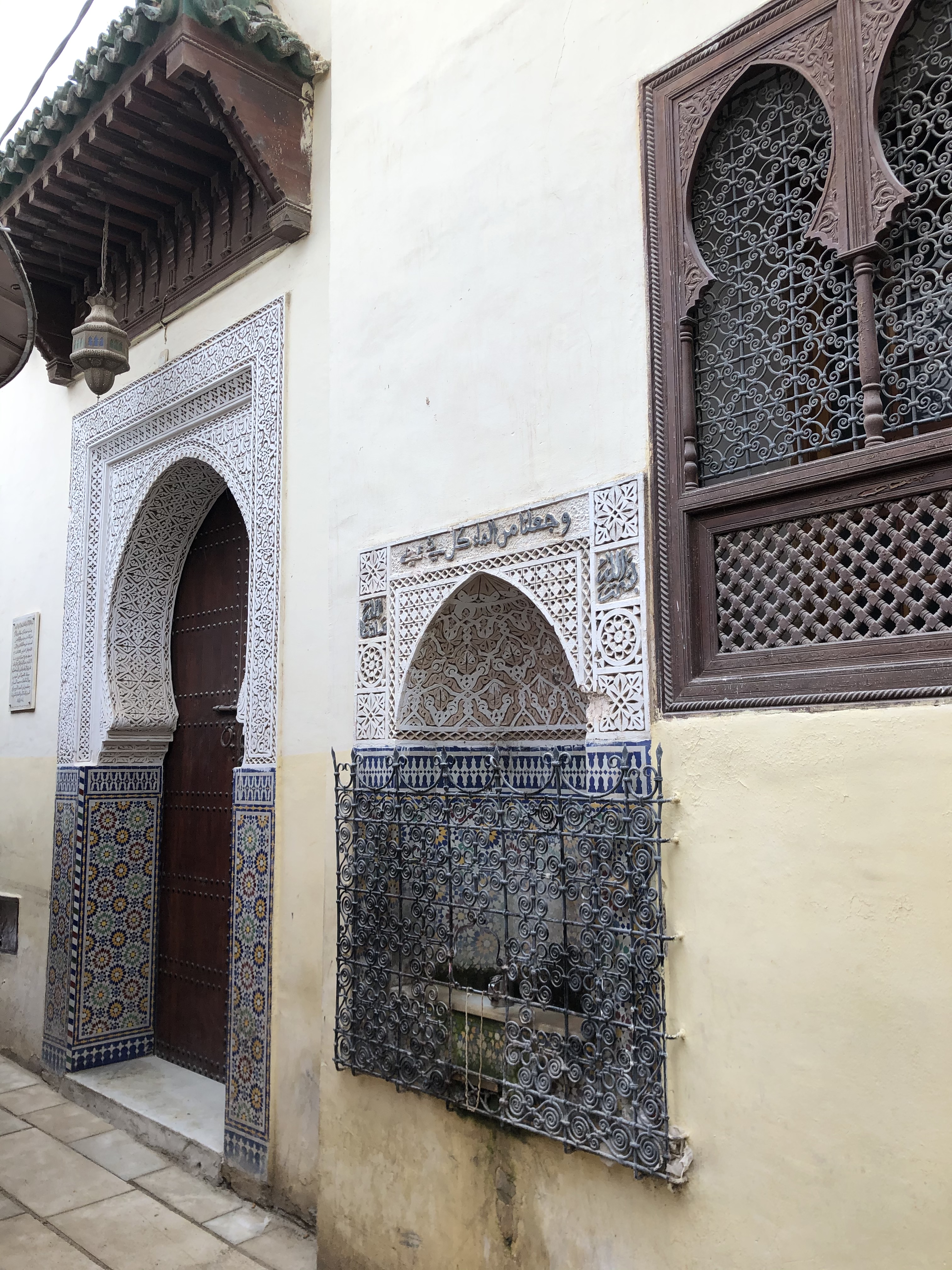
the old Medina of Taza

The city's most famous historic monument is the Great Mosque of Taza, an important piece of Moroccan architecture from the Almohad and Marinid periods. The old town's main thoroughfare is enlivened by the Grain Market and the Souks where wickerwork, tapestries, jewellery and other goods are sold. The road terminates at a square doubling as a parade ground which sports the Al-Andalous Mosque. The Mosque's minaret, constructed in the 14th century, is wider at the top than at its base.

Bab el-Qebbour Street crosses the Kissaria (covered marketplace), then leads on to the Market Mosque where it meets up with Bab Jamaa gate, the main point of entry of Taza. Somewhat further south, across from Bab el-Rih, the Wind Gate, a bastion dating from the 16th century closes the ring around the kasbah. Taza's city walls, raised in the 12th century and frequently enlarged on later occasions were equipped with a Borj or fortified tower 26 metres (85 ft) wide at the base by the Saadian sultan Ahmed el-Mansour in the 16th century. The gate with an iron grate and the casemates with terraced roofs are clearly influenced by European military architecture.

== Topology ==
Panorama of Taza from the southwest

The topology of the area has imposed a pattern of urban spread. Viewed from above, the city takes the form of a "T". It has its root in Taza high and stretches north to reach the bed of the Oued Larbaâ. Since the urban stretches east and west along the N6 between Fez and Oujda.

At the dawn of independence, the city consisted of the Medina High Taza, the European district occupying a hill called "No Adrar Illouz. People usually pronounce Draâ louz. This area became the center of town, and finally the station area a few kilometers below.

During the following years (60s, 70s) districts have emerged, midway between downtown and the train station (Bit Goulem, Ourida, Bin-Jradi).

During the 80s, other districts make their appearance, especially north of the city (and Massira Al-Quds), extended and developed areas today. The goal of this extension was the slum clearance. It was a success, since 1986 the city was declared a city without slums. The craze is such that sections like (Massira II) are villa style.

The 90s marked the beginning of the urbanization of the axis center - Taza above. These are buildings with 6 or 7 floors occupying a strategic content between public facilities (municipality, space, civil protection, hospital ibn baja, high school and college ...) and on the other hand, it is down the high rock a hundred yards. This area is also adjacent to the uptown-Qessou meddah, Friouato and Hay Shuhada (developed throughout the last three decades).

More recently this area is planning to also spread on the road to Fez for several kilometers to reach the intermittently R508 (about Tainast). The development plan provides a direct link between Taza West (at the "white bridge") and Taza high.

== Notable people ==
- Abdelkrim El Hadrioui - Former footballer
- Achraf Bencharki – Pro footballer
- Adel Taarabt - former Professional footballer
- Ahmed Bouzfour – Novelist
- Aicha Mekki – Journalist
- Jaouad Zairi - Former Moroccan-French footballer
- Mohsine Loukili – Novelist
- Niro, Moroccan-French rapper
- Rachid Ben Ali – Moroccan-Dutch painter

== See also ==
- Taza Province
- Medina of Taza
- Great Mosque of Taza
- Taza Airport
- Bou Hamara - early 20th century pretender to the throne of Morocco, based in Taza
