= Battle of Al Mahbes (1985) =

- Part of the Western Sahara War
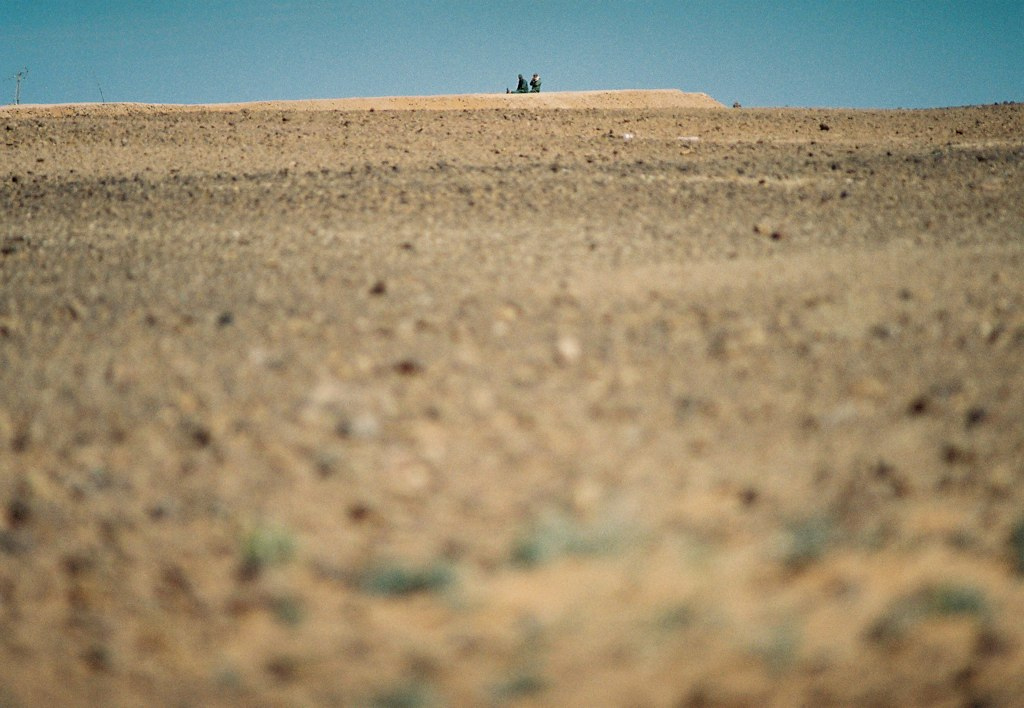
| Date | 12 January 1985 |
| Location | Al Mahbes, Western Sahara 27.416°N 9.051°W |

Belligerents
| Polisario Front | Morocco |

Casualties and losses
| 66 killed 6 T-55s; 2 BMP-1s; 6 other vehicles (Moroccan claim) | 25 Killed; 48 wounded (Moroccan claim); 311 killed 3 captured 1 Moroccan Mirage F1 shot down 17 tanks 14 armoured personnel carriers 21 other royal vehicles (Polisario claim) |
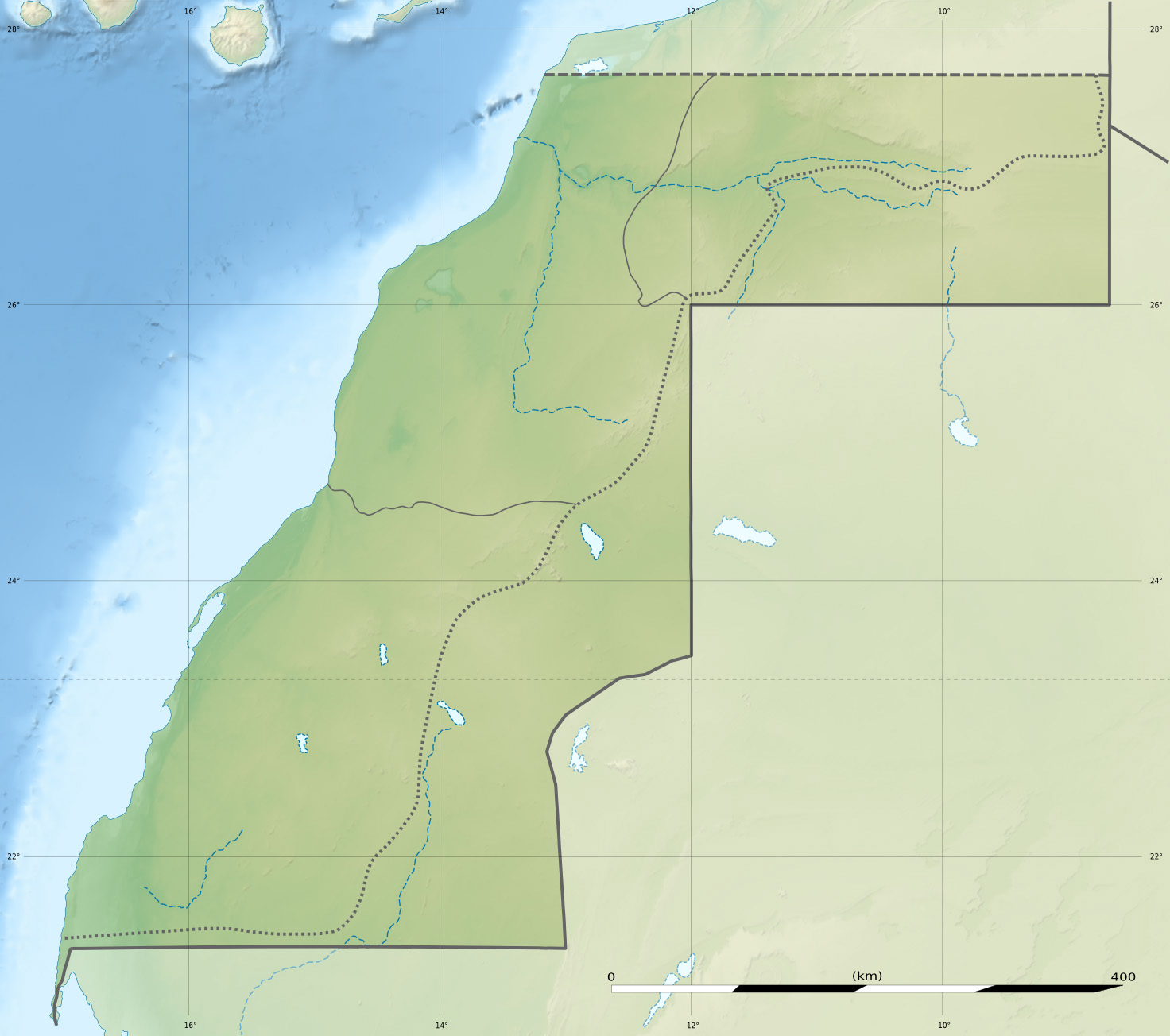
- Location within Western Sahara

The Battle of Mahbes was fought on 12 January 1985 during the Western Sahara War. As part of its Grand-Maghreb offensive, the Polisario Front, with heavy means (tanks and ground-to-air missiles), broke through the wall of sand defended by the Royal Moroccan armed forces.

== Background ==
Stages of construction of the Moroccan Western Sahara Wall.

The town of Al Mahbes was located behind the 4th sand wall, which was being completed.

Polisario forces in the regions were pushed back into their Algerian bases, but made one last attempt to break through.

According to the Moroccan Army, the Polisario Front engaged three motorised battalions (on Land Rovers), one battalion of T-55 tanks, and one mechanised battalion on BMP-1s.

== Battle ==
The Polisario Front attacked a Moroccan detachment participating in the construction of the wall north of Wadi Tenuechad, 8 kilometres from the Algerian border. The battle took place on a front of about fifteen kilometres from 7 a.m. to 4 p.m. then, according to Morocco, the attackers withdrew towards Algeria.

A Moroccan Mirage F1 fighter jet was shot down by Sahrawi 2K12 Kub missile. Morocco claimed that it was fired "from a bordering territory", alluding to Algeria.

== Casualties and consequences ==
Morocco announced that the Polisario's losses were 66 men, 6 T-55s, 2 BMP-1s and 6 other vehicles.

Rabat acknowledged that 25 Moroccan soldiers were killed and 48 wounded, while the Polisario communiqué announced the death of 311 soldiers, the capture of 3 other soldiers and the destruction of 17 tanks, 14 armored personnel carriers and 21 other royal vehicles. This attack showed that the Polisario were still capable of launching heavy attacks and that the Moroccan defense wall was not impassable.
