= Al Mahbes =

Town in the Western Sahara

Al Mahbes المحبس
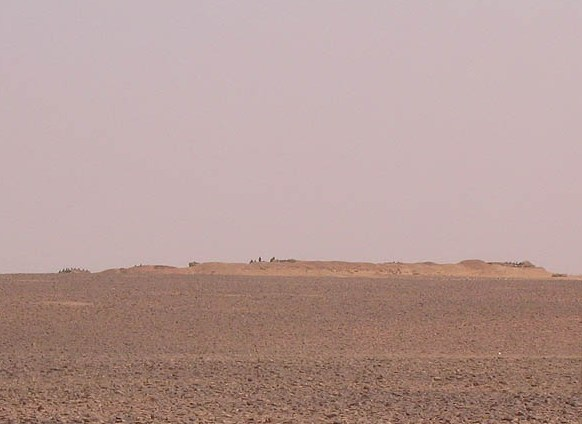

- Location in Western Sahara Al Mahbes (Africa)
- Coordinates: 27°24′57.6″N 9°3′3.6″W
- Territory: Western Sahara
- Claimed by: Kingdom of Morocco, Sahrawi Arab Democratic Republic

Area
  - Total: 55.0 km^{2} (21.2 sq mi)

Population (2004)
  - Total: 7,331
  - Density: 133/km^{2} (345/sq mi)
- Time zone: UTC+0 (GMT)

Al Mahbes (Arabic: المحبس) is a town in the UN-monitored buffer zone of Western Sahara, near the Algerian border, some 100 kilometres (62 mi) northeast of Bir Lehlou.

Mahbes' partner municipalities are the Spanish city of Noia and the Italian municipalities of Sesto Fiorentino and San Giovanni Valdarno.

== History ==
Two battles took place in Al Mahbes. The battle of Al Mahbes of 1979 and the battle of Al Mahbes that took place in 1985 during the Western Sahara War.

Al Mahbes was hit by significant strikes and incursions by the Polisario front in 2021. Skirmishes also occurred in 2024.
