= La Güera =

Ghost town in Western Sahara

La Güera الڭويرة (Hassaniyya)
- Ghost town
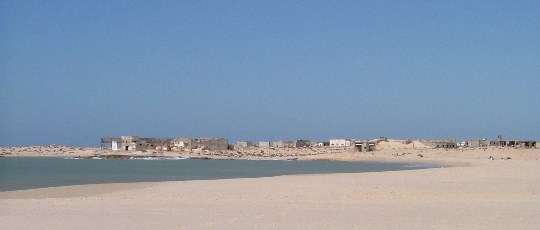
- La Güera ruins, January 2003

- Seal

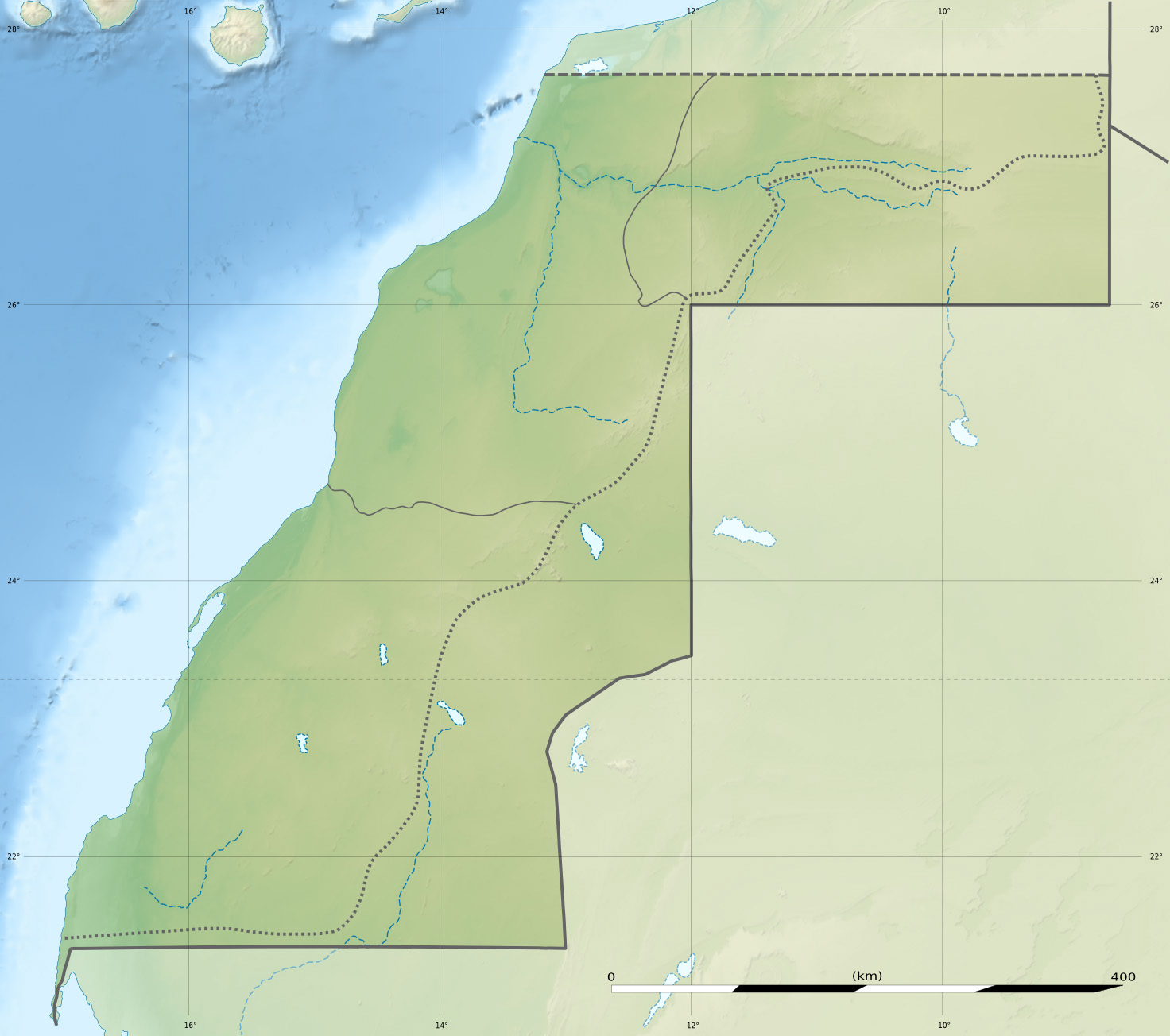
- Location in Western Sahara La Güera (Africa)
- Coordinates: 20°50′N 17°5′W
- Non-self-governing territory: Western Sahara
- Administering power: Spain (de jure) (Note: In 1976, Spain withdrew from Western Sahara and informed the Secretary-General of the United Nations that it no longer considers itself responsible for the territory. Nonetheless, the criminal division of the Audiencia Nacional ruled in 2014 that Spain remains as Western Sahara's de jure administering power. This position is shared by the United Nations, the African Union, and several jurists. Additionally, Spain continues to manage Western Saharan airspace.)
- Claimed by: Morocco; Sahrawi Republic
- Controlled by: Mauritania (de facto)
- Founded: 30 November 1920

Area
  - Total: 87.8 km^{2} (33.9 sq mi)

Population (2004)
  - Total: 3,726
  - Density: 42.4/km^{2} (110/sq mi)
- Time zone: UTC+0 (GMT)

La Güera (Arabic: الڭويرة al-Gūwayra; also known as La Agüera, Lagouira, El Gouera) is a ghost town on the Atlantic coast at the southern tip of Western Sahara, on the western side of the Ras Nouadhibou peninsula which is split in two by the Mauritania–Western Sahara border, 15 kilometres (9.3 mi) west of Nouadhibou. It is also the name of a daira at the Sahrawi refugee camps in south-western Algeria.

It is the southernmost town of Western Sahara. La Güera is situated about 65 kilometres (40 mi) south of the Moroccan Wall at Guerguerat and is largely abandoned.

== Etymology ==
The name's origin comes from the local tribes, who called the place "Güera" in Hassaniyya, meaning "steep crag by the sea". In the Spanish language, Agüera is a ditch that carries rainwater to crops.

== History ==
=== Foundation and settlement ===
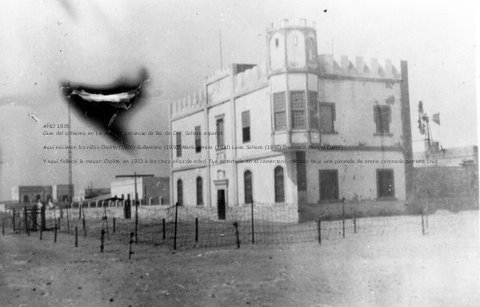
Residence of the Spanish Governor in La Güera, 1935.

La Güera came into existence in late 1920, when Spanish colonizer Francisco Bens (who had earlier taken possession of the Cape Juby region as a protectorate in 1916), after negotiating with tribal chiefs of the zone, established a fort and an air base on the western side of the Ras Nouadhibou peninsula, just a few kilometers away from the French settlement of Port-Étienne (now Nouadhibou) on the eastern side of the peninsula. (In the 1912 Convention of Madrid, Spain and France had agreed on a border between Mauritania and Spanish possessions that ran down the middle of the peninsula.)

In 1924, La Güera was incorporated into the Spanish colony of Río de Oro. During the short period (1920–1924) that the town was ruled as a separate part of the colony it released its own postage stamps. The town was served by La Güera Airport until the 1970s.

=== Western Sahara War ===
In 1979, when Mauritania withdrew from the war, La Güera's population was estimated to be 816 inhabitants.

Since the Alegal Madrid Tripartite Agreement of 1975, it remains territory in dispute. Before the long Sahrawi liberation war, the city was famous for its rich marine fauna: the Mediterranean monk seal as a symbol of the city, cetaceans and the special relationship of symbiosis in the art of fishing of these (dolphins) with fishermen belonging to the segment of the Sahrawi population most attached to Berber customs whose Amazigh language was still preserved, in the highest proportion of the territory, in addition to techniques and linguistic terms in common with Spanish fishermen from the Canary Islands and brothers of the same ethnic group Imraguen, from the Mauritanian side. The times when the Canary-Saharan fishing bank functioned at full capacity for the local people are now only memories of the yesterday.

=== Ghost town ===
By 2002, it had been mostly abandoned and partially overblown by sand, inhabited only by a very few Imraguen fishermen and guarded by a Mauritanian military outpost, despite this not being Mauritanian territory.

In February 2026, Moroccan media outlets reported that the United Arab Emirates was planning to develop a destination resort at the abandoned site.

== Twin towns and sister cities ==
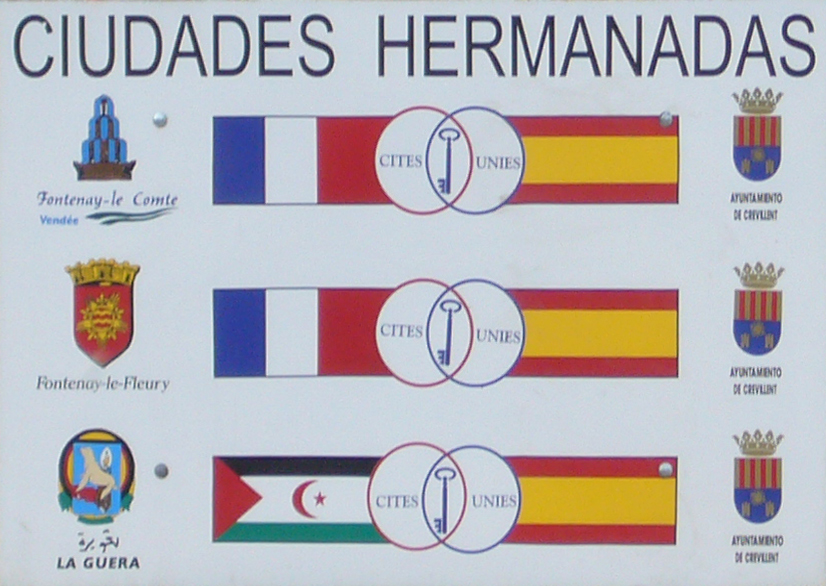
Signboard showing, among others, the twinning of La Güera with the Spanish town of Crevillent

- Águilas, Spain (since 18 July 2005)
- Alaquàs, Spain (since 14 April 2004)
- Almansa, Spain
- Castagneto Carducci, Italy
- Crevillent, Spain
- El Puerto de Santa María, Spain (since 1993)
- Fauglia, Italy (since 2009)
- Gorliz, Spain
- Guadix, Spain
- Iurreta, Spain
- Leganés, Spain (since 17 August 2001)
- Londa, Tuscany, Italy (since 2017)
- Monteriggioni, Italy
- Orio, Spain
- San Marcello Piteglio, Italy
- Santa Lucía de Tirajana, Spain (since 29 October 1986) – First twinning between a Sahrawi and a Spanish town
- Valle de Yerri, Spain (since 29 September 2005)
- Vitoria, Spain (since 1987)
