= La Güera Airport =

Airport in Western Sahara

- IATA: ~~ZLG~~; ICAO: none

Summary
- Serves: La Güera
- Location: La Güera, Western Sahara
- Elevation AMSL: 10 ft / 3 m
- Coordinates: 20°50′11″N 17°04′27″W

Map
- Location in Western Sahara

Runways
Direction	Length		Surface
Direction	ft	m	Surface
	~~3,937~~	~~1,200~~
- Source: Altiusdirectory.com

La Güera Airport ~~(IATA: ZLG)~~ was located adjacent to La Güera, Western Sahara.

The abandoned remains of a sand-drifted north–south runway 1,200 metres (3,937 ft) east of La Güera are visible in Google Earth historical imagery from 4 December 2010, but are indistinguishable in current satellite images.
