= JNIM–ISSP war =

Armed conflict

- Part of the War in the Sahel and the Al-Qaeda–Islamic State conflict
Date	March 2019 – present
Location	Tri-border region between Mali, Burkina Faso, and Niger, small-scale clashes in southern Burkina Faso, Benin, Ivory Coast, Kebbi State in Nigeria, and Togo
Status	Ongoing

Belligerents
Al-Qaeda; Jama'at Nusrat al-Islam wal-Muslimin	Islamic State; Sahel Province

Commanders and leaders
Iyad Ag Ghaly; Amadou Kouffa; Sedane Ag Hita; Djaffar Dicko; Abdelmalek Droukdel †; Ibrahim Malam Dicko †	Adnan Abu Walid al-Sahrawi †; Abu al-Bara' al-Sahrawi; Doundou Chefou; Abdelhakim al-Sahrawi †; Illiassou Djibo

Casualties and losses
Unknown	Unknown
- 2,200+ total deaths

The JNIM–ISSP war is an ongoing armed conflict between Jama'at Nusrat al-Islam wal-Muslimin (JNIM) and the Islamic State – Sahel Province (ISSP), the Sahelian branches of al-Qaeda and the Islamic State, respectively. Since ISGS's formation in October 2016 and the creation of the JNIM coalition in 2017, the two groups had been described as the Sahelien exception or Sahelien anomaly: despite the global war between al-Qaeda and Islamic State affiliates since the latter's splinter from the former in 2014, both ISGS and JNIM have ignored each other and in rare cases worked together against Malian, Nigerien, Burkinabe, French, Russian, and international governments and non-Islamist militias until 2020.

The first ideological split between the two groups began in early 2019, but intensified in the summer 2020 due to a variety of factors. JNIM press releases in 2019 attempted to mend the split between the two jihadists groups and called for unity, but by early 2020, JNIM began calling the ISGS "khawarij", a pejorative term for a historical group of Muslims who fought against the first Caliphate for inconclusive reasons. The ideological split was fueled by more confrontational propaganda after ISGS became an official province of the Islamic State under ISWAP in early 2019, and propaganda outlets fell under ISWAP control. ISGS referred to JNIM leaders Iyad Ag Ghaly and Amadou Koufa as allied with the Malian government to fight the ISGS, and accused them of starting a war. Issues between the treatment of the local population and minority groups also differed between the two groups, and both ISGS and JNIM championed themselves as protectors of Fulani.

Clashes first broke out in March 2019, with attempted negotiations to reconnect the two groups occurring in the following June and October. By January 2020, the war between the two groups was in full swing, and 125 clashes had been reported between the two groups and 415 fighters killed on both sides between 2019 and 2021. These clashes took place in eastern Mali's Ménaka and Gao regions and northern Burkina Faso. JNIM seized control of territories in these areas formerly controlled by ISGS with the exception of a few pockets, but ISGS expanded further into Niger and eastern Burkina Faso.

A significant operational difference between JNIM and ISGS is their civilian engagement strategy. According to Tammy Palacios, senior analyst and manager of the Priority Sustainable Counterterrorism portfolio at the New Lines Institute and Modern War Institute at West Point Fellow, JNIM's territorial expansion is largely due to this civilian engagement strategy and differentiates the two groups in the region, in terms of their operational strategies. JNIM and ISGS are both lethal and do kill civilians, including by horrendous means such as beheading, but JNIM has demonstrated a more intentional restraint to killing civilians and have made civilian engagement core to their approach in maintaining and taking control of territory in the tri-state hot zone. Both JNIM and ISGS consider it a killable offense for a civilian[s] to share information or to collaborate with the other group or with state security or volunteer fighting forces and civilians are killed en masse for this offense—removed from transport busses at road checkpoints and killed, even killed at their places of domicile in the middle of the night.

In the ISGS's Ménaka offensive in 2022 and 2023, the group's attacks on minorities and civilians alleged to be sympathetic to JNIM killed hundreds of civilians, and forced thousands to flee elsewhere. The clashes have also created a weakness in both groups, allowing them to be attacked by French, Russian, Malian, Nigerien, and Burkinabe forces.

== Background ==
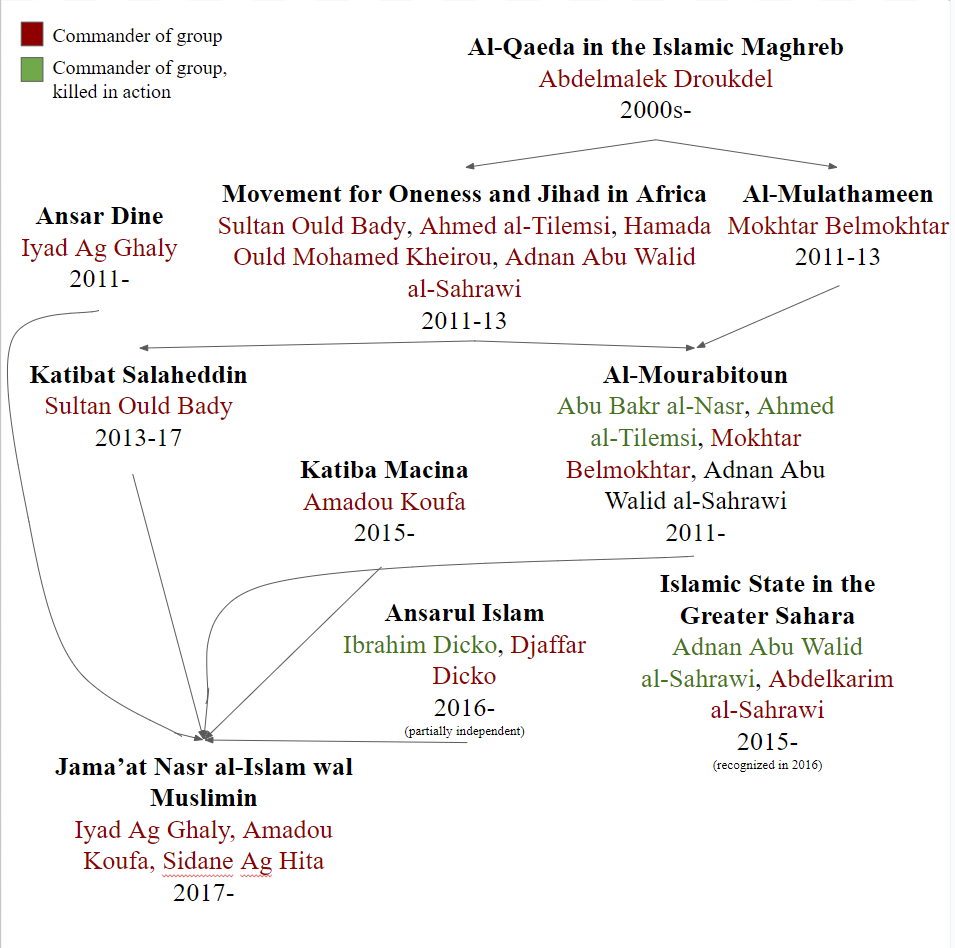
Chart outlining all groups preceding JNIM and ISGS

=== Original jihadist groups in Mali ===
Several jihadist groups were formed in the early years of the Mali War, and many of them worked together against French and Malian forces and moderate Tuareg rebel groups like the Coordination of Azawad Movements (CMA). Al-Qaeda in the Islamic Maghreb (AQIM) led by Mokhtar Belmokhtar and Abdelmalek Droukdel was the predecessor of many of these groups as AQIM had been active in the Sahel since the early 2000s. In 2012, Movement for Oneness and Jihad in West Africa (MOJWA) and Al-Mulathameen split from AQIM. MOJWA was founded by Sultan Ould Bady and led by Ahmed al-Tilemsi, Hamada Ould Mohamed Kheirou and Adnan Abu Walid al-Sahrawi, and al-Mulathameen was led by Belmokhtar.

Al-Mourabitoun was formed in 2013 as the merger of MOJWA and al-Mulathameen and pledged allegiance to Al-Qaeda. Tilemsi and Belmokhtar allowed Abu Bakr al-Nasr to command the group. When Nasr was killed by French forces, Tilemsi took over until he was killed in 2014. Tilemsi's death was the first spark of separatism for an Islamic State-sympathetic faction of al-Mourabitoun led by Sahrawi. Sahrawi pledged allegiance to IS caliph Abu Bakr al-Baghdadi in May 2015, bringing with him his faction of fighters and creating their own Islamic State after al-Mourabitoun leader Belmokhtar denounced Sahrawi's bay'ah and reconfirmed the group's loyalty to al-Qaeda.

=== Ethnic affiliations and rise of Jama'at Nusrat al-Islam wal Muslimin ===
Jihadist groups that were predominantly composed of ethnic groups, such as Ansar Dine led by Iyad Ag Ghaly and predominantly composed of Ifoghas Tuaregs and Katiba Macina led by Amadou Koufa and composed of Fulani people often from central Mali, continued their allegiance to al-Qaeda in 2015. Al-Mourabitoun eventually rejoined AQIM that same year, and MOJWA founder Sultan Ould Bady had formed his own group Katibat Salaheddin in 2013. Ansar Dine, Katiba Macina, Al-Mourabitoun, Katibat Salaheddin, and the budding Burkinabe jihadist group Ansarul Islam led by Ibrahim Malam Dicko and Djaffar Dicko formed the Jama'at Nusrat al-Islam wal Muslimin coalition in March 2017. Jama'at Nusrat al-Islam wal Muslimin (JNIM) became al-Qaeda's affiliate in the Sahel, and was led by the Tuareg Ghaly and Fulani Koufa.

Sahrawi's Islamic State-affiliated group was not recognized by IS caliph al-Baghdadi until October 2016. The group began its first attacks in Niger in early October, and was eventually recognized on October 30, 2016, by al-Baghdadi as an official IS-affiliated group part of Islamic State – West Africa Province (ISWAP). Despite al-Qaeda and the Islamic State being at war globally after Abu Bakr al-Baghdadi broke off from the former to create the latter in 2014, JNIM and ISGS commanders maintained contact with one another and even coordinated attacks with each other. These connections were based on mutual enemies in non-Islamist groups or governments and tribal alliances in local conflicts. Katiba Macina founder and leader Kouffa, an ethnic Fulani, met with Fulani ISGS commander Illiassou Djibo in early 2017 to discuss cooperation. Many JNIM commanders in Mali's Menaka Region also acted as liaisons and sometimes fighters with the ISGS.

The first coordinated attack between ISGS and JNIM was in November 2017, against a contingent of Nigeriens in MINUSMA. A JNIM commander then participated in the 2019 Tongo Tongo ambush which killed 30 Nigerien soldiers, and the Koutougou attack in August 2019 in Burkina Faso that killed dozens of Burkinabe soldiers. The deadliest attack by both ISGS and JNIM was in Inates, Niger in 2019, when over seventy Nigerien soldiers were killed by ISGS under the command of JNIM and High Council for the Unity of Azawad (HCUA) fighters. Joint attacks where one group would ambush a target and the other would attack reinforcements also took place, along with JNIM-ISGS cooperation against Tuareg militias of GATIA and the MSA.

JNIM and ISGS commands were also intertwined often, and both groups claimed the same attack at times. Researchers Heni Nsaibia and Caleb Weiss stated that in the late 2010s, JNIM and ISGS were more concerned about establishing an Islamic State than territorial control.

== Prelude ==
Nsaibia and Weiss reported that while a variety of factors drove ISGS and JNIM to war with one another, the main reasons were ideological splits, Sahrawi's faction becoming inducted as a part of ISWAP in March 2019, and the subsequent outward growth and territorial influence by ISGS as central Islamic State leadership urged it to be more confrontational with JNIM. ISGS's induction into the global Islamic State also intensified differences in their treatment of local populations and ethnic and clan alliances, sparking many defections from Katiba Macina and other groups.

=== Role of central Islamic State ===
JNIM propaganda written in early 2020 by Qutaybah Abu Numan al-Shinqiti, a Mauritanian Islamic scholar sympathetic to al-Qaeda, stated that JNIM needed to implement sharia law slowly to gain the trust of local populations in contrast to the Islamic State's immediate and harsh implementations, although the propaganda piece did not mention ISGS by name. A second pamphlet written by al-Shinqiti retold the story of the Hasan–Mu'awiya treaty as an example for ISGS and JNIM to reconcile their differences. JNIM audio messages in Tamacheq, Fulfulde, Arabic, and other local languages also called on Muslims to resist the khawarij, a pejorative term for the Islamic State, and dubbed ISGS's growing influence as a test to separate true believes from false ones in the Sahel.

Following ISGS's absorption into ISWAP in March 2019, central Islamic State leadership took a more direct role in managing the media output of ISGS. Most media output by ISGS prior to the merger was rudimentary and there was little collaboration with global Islamic State messaging. Under the new management, ISGS media was reported by central Islamic State al-Naba reports, and became extremely anti-JNIM as ISGS, ISWAP, and the central Islamic State began viewing JNIM as a competitor instead of an ally. In the first half of 2020, Islamic State leaders and reports accused JNIM leadership of working with "apostate" groups to maintain their status as the largest jihadist group in the Sahel, and working with Algeria to attack ISGS. Islamic State spokesman Abu Hamza Al-Qurashi also taunted JNIM for a high number of defections of their fighters to ISGS in Qurashi's accusation of JNIM trying to maintain their regional hegemony.

=== Defections ===
As ISGS grew in Mali, Burkina Faso, and Niger by expanding their territorial influence over the areas and conducting large and deadly attacks, they were able to take advantage of internal disputes amid Katiba Macina in Mali. Many fighters disgruntled with Kouffa's leadership defected to ISGS in early 2020. Part of the reason for these dissensions was JNIM and Katiba Macina being open to treaties and non-aggression pacts with Dogon and Bambara in Mali, as Dogon and Bambara groups were in a war with Fulani, which make up the bulk of Katiba Macina. Abdelhakim al-Sahrawi, the second-in-command of ISGS, heavily criticized these pacts and subsequently drew many Fulani from Katiba Macina to ISGS. Kouffa's dealings with traditional Fulani leaders also alienated many of his fighters, as some perceived the creation and expansion of Katiba Macina as a form of dismantling the traditional Fulani caste system. Fulani elites who initially supported Kouffa's ideas of an Islamist Fulani empire also ceded their support when lower-caste Fulani began rising through Katiba Macina's ranks. More Islamist factions of JNIM and Katiba Macina also began defecting after Kouffa laxed sharia laws to welcome new groups, and hardline Islamist critics began praising ISGS's system of governance over JNIM's. ISGS as a whole began capitalizing off these intra-Fulani conflicts, and defections soon began en masse.

The first major defection was in November 2017 by a group of Tolebe Fulani from Ménaka Region. Katibat Salaheddin, a founding group of JNIM led by Sultan Ould Bady, joined ISGS soon after. This was not extremely critical to JNIM's operations, however, as both JNIM and ISGS were still on good terms at the time. Kouffa, however, did release a statement in November 2018 calling for unity between Fulani. Factions of Ansarul Islam in Burkina Faso also defected to ISGS in 2019. One of the first major defections from Katiba Macina in was that of Mamadou Mobbo in January 2020, whose fighters fought briefly with pro-Kouffa members of Katiba Macina before Mobbo's group defected to ISGS and declared loyalty to the Islamic State. Many of these defections also revolved around the sharing of loot, taxes levied in JNIM-controlled territories versus ISGS-controlled territories, and local tribal alliances. Attempts to mediate the conflict in 2019 failed three times.

== War ==
The first reported clashes between the two groups began in July 2019 in the town of Ariel, Burkina Faso. Little else is known about the battle. The next clashes were reported in Haoussa-Foulane, Gao Region, Mali in September 2019. By December 2019 through January 2020, clashes between JNIM and ISGS had been reported in southern Mondoro, Dogo, and Inabelbel, Mali. In the first part of 2020, ISGS began expanding its influence and territorial control throughout Mali's Gao Region.

=== All-out war (2020) ===
By early 2020, the clashes had spread to Fassala on the Malian-Mauritanian border, the first reported battle outside of areas traditionally controlled by Katiba Macina. The Mopti Region towns of Dialloubé, Koubi, Djantakai, and Nigua all saw fighting between JNIM and ISGS in March and April 2020, along with areas in the Mali-Burkina Faso border area of Liptako Gourma. At least thirty-five JNIM fighters were killed in these battles and many were wounded, according to ISGS. Two battles were reported in Pobe and Keraboule, Soum Province, Burkina Faso on April 20 between JNIM and ISGS, and JNIM launched an offensive on ISGS-controlled towns in Ndaki, Mali on April 18. ISGS eventually got the upper hand in Ndaki after a suicide bomber targeted JNIM, and ISGS captured forty vehicles at the end of the battle. On April 16, battles were reported in N'Tillit on the Malian-Nigerien border and Aghay, Niger. During an April 2020 French offensive on ISGS in Liptako Gourma, the group accused JNIM of being spared by French forces.

Neither side acknowledged the clashes until the May 2020 issue of Al-Naba where ISGS accused JNIM of working with the Malian government and ethnic militias, and specifically targeted their attacks toward Kouffa and Ghaly. These accusations extended to Ansarul Islam in June 2020, with an Al-Naba that month claiming that Ansarul Islam, with the help of JNIM, had lost 170 fighters in battles with ISGS in northern Burkina Faso the month prior. In that same issue of al-Naba, ISGS claimed to have fought battles with Ansarul Islam near the Ghanaian border with Burkina Faso. Central al-Qaeda leadership disputed this story of events, with Abdelmalek Droukdel reportedly ordering JNIM to "eradicate the Islamic State and eradicate them from land of the mujahideen."

These clashes intensified in October 2020 and took place mainly in southern Gao Region near the Burkinabe border and in central Mopti Region. The fighting between January and July that signalled the intensification of the conflict and descent into open war had seen JNIM largely push ISGS out of the Inner Niger Delta area in southern Gao with ISGS holding influence in Dialloube and Kounari of Mopti Region. The fighting between this timeframe primarily took place in the tri-border area of Mali, Burkina Faso, and Niger in what the Islamic State dubbed "the triangle of death", although JNIM and ISGS fought along the Beninese border and southern Burkina Faso as well.

=== Tactics towards civilians and expansion south (October 2020 – May 2022) ===
The war also brought ISGS to attack civilians in high numbers, with the Tchoma Bangou and Zaroumdareye massacres in western Niger killing over a hundred civilians who refused to pay ISGS taxes. These civilian attacks were intensified due to ISGS's loss in late 2020 as the group fought a war against every other actor in the region. Around this same time, JNIM attempted to improve its image among the people it governed and to outside areas by establishing Islamic courts, redistributing wealth from their taxes, and allowing NGOs to operate in territory under their influence to distribute aid. JNIM also increased its efforts to establish non-aggression pacts and peace treaties with rival ethnic groups and pro-government militias, succeeding with the Niono Agreement that helped break the siege of Farabougou in October 2020. JNIM and the Malian government in late 2020 and early 2021, following the 2020 Malian coup d'état, also opened up to the idea of a peace treaty to combat ISGS, although these talks fell through.

French intervention in the region killed Adnan Abu Walid al-Sahrawi in October 2021, several months after second-in-command Abdelhakim al-Sahrawi was killed by French forces. Defections continued sporadically in 2021, driven by the same underlying factors that had emerged prior to the outbreak of full-scale war: divergent interpretations of Islam, internal conflicts within Fulani communities, and competing systems of governance.

On the battleground in Burkina Faso, JNIM maintained their hold in Est and Nord regions and expanded to Centre-Nord and Cascades regions. Clashes continued in northern and northeastern Burkina Faso between JNIM and ISGS, but ISGS was unable to expand to more than an insurgency against the Burkinabe government and JNIM in the region. Because of this, JNIM was able to gain control of or extort gold mines and smuggling networks deeper in Burkina Faso, offsetting the lost tax revenue from ISGS attracting JNIM members and affiliated locals in Mali. Ransom operations from kidnapping foreigners also gained JNIM a lot of money. JNIM's kidnapping of Burkinabe Volunteers for the Defense of the Homeland (VDP) militiamen were moreso to maintain control over JNIM-occupied territory. Many of these illicit economic activities took place in southern and eastern Burkina Faso and along the Beninese and Nigerien borders, where the Burkinabe state had little control and the presence of ISGS was minimal. By becoming the dominant group in these areas, the economic revenue and territorial gains was much safer than in the north.

JNIM's influence also grew in Burkina Faso due to the VDP's racist attacks against Fulani in northern and northeastern Burkina Faso, notably the 2020 Djibo massacres, rallying many Fulani in the north to support the group over the government. However, JNIM and affiliated groups began attacking VDP and civilians sympathetic to the government in deadly attacks in Kodyel, Mansila, and national parks, culminating in the Solhan and Tadaryat massacres that killed over 160 civilians. Extremists within JNIM began defecting to ISGS in the north, and the Burkinabe government began cracking down even harsher on JNIM and Fulani communities.

In Niger, ISGS had a larger presence in the area than JNIM, and civilians began resisting the group as they expanded. This resistance was met with clashes between ISGS and civilian militias occasionally supported by Nigerian forces. In areas where civilian defenses failed, ISGS slaughtered the residents and cracked down on dissent. The aforementioned Tchoma Bangou and Zaroumdareye massacres also sparked backlash from non-Fulani groups like the Zarma, who began attacking Fulani villages and civilians, accusing them of supporting ISGS. Massacres by ISGS on the villages of Bakoret, Intazayene, and Oursanet in Tahoua Region, which included a Tuareg refugee camp, brought Arab and Tuareg militias to mobilize against ISGS and Fulani communities. Many attacks between Fulani and non-Fulani groups in Niger were part of ISGS's expansion in the region against the Nigerien state and JNIM, but also overlapped with communal violence between different ethnic groups and clans.

=== Truce and return to hostilities (May 2022 – present) ===
JNIM and ISGS signed a truce in May 2022 that ended clashes between the two groups on all fronts. This truce was the first major cessation of hostilities since the failed truces in 2019. At the same time as the truce, ISGS began the Ménaka offensive in southeastern Mali against the Tuareg militias GATIA and the Movement for the Salvation of Azawad (MSA), which had been a serious thorn in ISGS's side after the group's defeat in the 2020 clashes between JNIM and ISGS. The offensive gained steam due to the inhibition of the JNIM threat, growing discontent in the region with the Malian junta officials and the Wagner Group mercenaries that entered the country in early 2022, and an increase in ISGS support from the central Islamic State. In March 2022, the central Islamic State announced that ISGS would be promoted to a full province of the Islamic State and renamed Islamic State – Sahil Province, although the English acronym remained ISSP to not be mixed up with Islamic State – Sinai Province (ISSP). (Note: From here on out, ISGS will be referred to as ISSP.) The offensive in Menaka saw many defections to the ISSP in the region in territories that were formerly under JNIM influence and control in Mali, Niger, and Burkina Faso.

This truce broke on November 3, 2022, when an al-Naba publication by ISSP announced the killing of forty JNIM fighters in Mali's Menaka region. JNIM restarted calls to mobilize against ISSP, as the group had conducted several massacres against Tuareg and other civilians in the region. The clashes between the two groups intensified in December 2022 during fighting that killed dozens of fighters on either side across several battles along with over seventy civilians. ISSP' brutality against civilians positioned JNIM to propagandize themselves as the sole protector of civilians in the Sahel. This statement only gained credence after the January 2022 and September 2022 Burkinabe coups d'état that brought a junta in Burkina Faso that conducted more attacks on civilians in the name of stopping JNIM and ISSP. In response to the Menaka offensive, JNIM signed a non-aggression pact with the Strategic Framework for the Defense of the People of Azawad (CSP) and High Council for the Unity of Azawad (HCUA), two moderate Tuareg groups based in northern Mali.

Attacks between the two groups continued into 2023, with fierce battles being reported in February 2023 in Mali, and elsewhere between March and August. A new group, Jama'at Wahdat al-Muslimin was formed in August 2023 to found a truce between the groups, but these notions faded quickly. While hostilities between JNIM and ISSP were fierce in 2022 and 2023, they were not as intense and common as those of 2019 and 2020 due to financial strain and both groups having a bigger enemy in the Malian, Burkinabe, and Nigerien juntas. Neither group focused on holding territory, but instead gaining influence by earning the trust of the local population and being seen as a protective group, especially as the Sahelian juntas began targeting civilians more often. Many populations sympathetic to JNIM and ISSP see the price of living under sharia law worth it compared to being attacked by Malian, Burkinabe, or Nigerien soldiers. Fighting between the two groups resumed in Bambofa, Dori Department, Burkina Faso on June 26, 2025, with JNIM claiming to have killed several IS-SP militants. Another clash occurred on September 16, 2025, near Sebba, Burkina Faso, where IS-SP militants ambushed JNIM positions to have killed 50-70 JNIM members in the attack, though exact figures remain unverified. Another clash occurred in the Pétél Kolé border crossing, in the Téra Department on 6 April 2026, where IS militants clashed with JNIM militants, killing 35 JNIM militants.

After a period of low-level clashes between the two groups, the conflict reignited on 2 September 2026 in the Kacham, Dori and Ndaki Region along the border of Mali and Burkina Faso. ISSP claimed to have killed more than 200 JNIM fighters, wounded dozens, captured and subsequently executed more than 30 captured fighters, and seized large quantities of weapons and motorcycles. While the claims couldn’t be verified, according to ACLED analyst Heni Nsaibia “if accurate, the reported death toll would make this the deadliest battle between the groups recorded by ACLED.” According to JNIM the death toll is exaggerated, although the group has still admitted defeat.

== Propaganda ==
JNIM and the ISSP have both produced or published propaganda against each other, with both having different approaches to their propaganda.

=== JNIM Propaganda ===
JNIM's media wing Az-Zallaqa has published multiple videos against ISSP, usually showing clashes with the group, or showing videos of people injured by ISSP.

In the videos that show JNIM fighting ISSP they use the common propaganda tool used by Al-Qaeda and ISIS called nasheeds, many of JNIM's videos against ISSP use Nasheeds from killed AQAP member Abu Yusuf Al-Waqari, who was a staunch anti-IS vocalist. These videos would commonly use the nasheeds "Woe to you, O' descendants of Harqous" (in Arabic: ويل لكم يا احفاد حرقوص) and "Shoot at the enemy" (In Arabic: كرة على معتدي كرة) both made by Abu Yusuf.
