= Battle of Andéramboukane (2022) =

Battle for Andéramboukane

Coordinates: 15°25′N 3°01′E

- Part of the Mali War
Date	4–5 June 2022
Location	Andéramboukane, Mali
Result	Islamic State victory

Belligerents
GATIA; MSA; Mali	Islamic State: Sahel Province

Commanders and leaders
Moussa Ag Acharatoumane; El Hadj Ag Gamou; Sidi Ghaly	Abu al-Bara al-Sahrawi

Casualties and losses
20 (per GATIA); 67 (per ISGS)	70 (per MSA); 100 (per GATIA)

The Battle of Andéramboukane occurred between 4 and 5 June 2022, during the Ménaka offensive of the Mali War. The pro-government militias Movement for the Salvation of Azawad (MSA) and Imghad Tuareg Self-Defense Group and Allies (GATIA) attempted to retake the Islamic State-held town of Andéramboukane but were unsuccessful.

== Background ==
In March 2022, the Islamic State in the Greater Sahara (ISGS) launched an offensive in the Ménaka Region of eastern Mali, held predominantly by pro-government Tuareg militias. By April, ISGS fighters had killed 300 to 500 civilians in Ménaka region, mainly Tuaregs. ISGS captured Andéramboukane on March 12, and the town, previously populated by around 20,000 residents, became a "ghost town."

By May, the ISGS offensive had stalled, although they still controlled a swath of territory by the Malian border, including Andéramboukane and the surrounding towns of Infoukeraten, Tadjalalt, Ichinanane, and Tamalat. Around the end of May, ISGS went on the offensive again, attacking the towns of Aghazraghen Igadou, Emis-Emis, and Inekar, east of the regional capital of Ménaka. These attacks failed, and prompted GATIA and the MSA to prepare for a counter-attack on Andéramboukane.

Prior to the Tuareg offensive, the Malian Army had been relatively inactive in the region, with only a mainly-Tuareg group called GTIA 8 being present in the area. GTIA 8 was commanded by El Hadj Ag Gamou, the overall commander of GATIA, and many GTIA 8 troops had close ties with GATIA.

== Battle ==
On June 4, GATIA and MSA forces entered Andéramboukane without a fight, capturing the city. However, France24 alleged the jihadists knew about the Tuareg incursion beforehand, and let them enter the city. The next morning, ISGS began a counter-attack on the town. GATIA and the MSA left the city to pursue the IS fighters, but were ambushed in Tadjalalt, suffering heavy losses and being forced to retreat to Ménaka. After several hours of fighting with remaining Tuareg forces in the center of Andéramboukane, ISGS regained control of the city.

== Losses and aftermath ==
The exact death toll is unknown. Fahad Ag al-Mahmoud, the secretary-general of GATIA, claimed twenty "friendly" fighters were killed, and a hundred jihadists were killed. Moussa Ag Acharatoumane, the leader of the MSA, alleged on June 9 that 70 ISGS fighters were killed during the fighting. Both Moussa Ag Acharatoumane and El Hadj Ag Gamous denied claims they were injured, although Sidi Ghaly, a Tuareg commander during the battle, was wounded.

The Islamic State reported 67 Tuareg soldiers were killed, eight vehicles captured, and seventeen destroyed. On June 22, the Islamic State released a large graphic photo report showing the bodies of more than 45 Tuareg soldiers alongside captured and destroyed vehicles, and a large quantity of captured weapons and ammunition.
