= Ménaka offensive =

Offensive by the Islamic State in Mali

- Part of the Mali War, al-Qaeda–Islamic State conflict, and the JNIM-ISGS war
Date	March 8, 2022 – May 2023
Location	Ménaka Cercle, Mali
Result	Islamic State in the Greater Sahara victory
Territorial changes	All of the Menaka region, besides the city of Menaka, comes under Islamic State control

Belligerents
Platform: Movement for the Salvation of Azawad; Imghad Tuareg Self-Defense Group and Allies; Mali; Takuba Task Force (until June 2022): France; Czech Republic; Wagner Group (from June 2022): Niger (from March 2023); Jama'at Nasr al-Islam wal Muslimin	Islamic State in the Greater Sahara

Commanders and leaders
Moussa Ag Acharatoumane; El Hadj Ag Gamou Iyad Ag Ghaly	Oumeya Ould Albakaye; Abu al-Bara' al-Sahrawi

Casualties and losses
Unknown	Unknown
- 900+ (per ACLED) (as of September 2022); 1,000+ (per MSA) (as of July 2022); 50,000 refugees

The Ménaka offensive was a series of offensives launched by the Islamic State in the Greater Sahara against the Malian Army, Tuareg self-defense groups including the Movement for the Salvation of Azawad (MSA) and Imghad Tuareg Self-Defense Group and Allies (GATIA), and the al-Qaeda-aligned Jama'at Nasr al-Islam wal Muslimin. The offensives took place in the Ménaka Cercle, in southeastern Mali.

== Background ==
=== Rise of the conflict in Menaka ===
In the late 2010s, the Menaka Cercle, which borders Niger and Burkina Faso at a tripoint, has seen fighting between Tuareg self-defense groups and jihadist groups. The first clashes began in the mid-2010's with Movement for Oneness and Jihad in West Africa (MUJAO), a precursor to Jama'at Nasr al-Islam wal Muslimin (JNIM), and by the 2020s, the Islamic State in the Greater Sahara became the largest jihadist group in the area. ISGS is predominantly made up of Fulani, a nomadic Muslim herder group that has been in conflict with the Daoussahak Tuaregs for generations. In 2017, the leader of ISGS, Adnan Abu Walid al-Sahrawi, accused the MSA and GATIA, in particular their leaders Moussa Ag Acharatoumane and El Hadj Ag Gamou, of allying with France and Niger. The accusation was a double entendre, accusing all Tuaregs of allying with France, Niger, and Mali, and al-Sahrawi threatened attacks on Tuaregs if MSA and GATIA did not denounce the governments of those countries.

The statement by ISGS intensified conflict between Tuaregs and Fulani, sparking the Aklaz and Awkassa massacres that saw 47 Tuareg civilians killed by ISGS. In 2021, faced with an increase of Tuareg and Zarma militias in Menaka region and Niger's Tillabéri region, ISGS increased massacres against Tuareg civilians and militants, killing several hundred. Around this time, ISGS expanded to Niger's Tahoua and Tillia regions.

=== Areas of control prior to the offensives ===
By 2022, the capital and largest city of Ménaka Cercle, the town of Ménaka, was under control of the MSA, along with several other key towns in the region. The Malian Army, French Army in Operation Barkhane, and a Czech contingent of Takuba Task Force were present in Ménaka as well, but only the city. At the time, the French army was in the process of dismantling Operation Barkhane, and the Malian government rejected their requests to intervene. In an interview, the journalist Wassim Nasr stated "The security of this area depends on the MSA, the CSP, and other Tuareg factions." At the time, JNIM controlled areas south and west of Talataye.

Despite the death of al-Sahrawi in 2021, ISGS was able to launch its offensive with several hundred fighters. Part of this strength came from an alliance with Islamic State West Africa Province (ISWAP), which including fighters from Nigeria. In late March 2022, the Amaq News Agency declared ISGS to be its own separate province of the Islamic State, as previously it was considered part of ISWAP.

== Initial attacks ==
=== Tamalat and Insalane attacks ===
On March 1, 2022, Omar Ag Badjat, an MSA officer, was assassinated by ISGS in the village of Igaghi. In response, the MSA banned civilians in Tamalat sympathetic to ISGS from giving them food. In the days that followed, eight ISGS militants were killed in reprisal attacks. On March 5, videos circulated of ISGS leadership stating that under Islamic law, it was lawful to kill cattle of Daoussahak who supported the MSA. The group launched raids on Tuareg herders, killing hundreds of cattle near the Malian-Nigerien border.

On March 8, around 2pm, several hundred ISGS fighters launched a raid on the village of Tamalat, and captured it. MSA reinforcements made their way to the village, but as they were picking up bodies, ISGS raided a second time. Two MSA commanders were killed in the attack. The next day, the MSA released a statement warning of ISGS-affiliated attackers in Tamalat. They also claimed that in the attacks, four MSA fighters were killed and two were injured, twelve civilians massacred, and three ISGS attackers killed. Local sources stated that despite regaining control of Tamalat, the MSA was alone in the conflict against ISGS in the Tamalat area, and that the group was surprised with the number of attackers and the more elaborate tactics used.

The following day, on March 9, ISGS attacked the village of Insinane (also known as Inchinane). In the past, Insinane had often been spared of jihadist attacks, and because of this, was a regional economic hub with many businesses and strong Tuareg militant security. In the Insinane attack, the village was looted and burned, and dozens of Daoussahak civilians were killed.

Following the attacks at Tamalat and Insalane, ISGS retreated back across the Nigerien border. After the attacks, witnesses stated between forty and 100 civilians were killed in the massacres. Both MSA and GATIA sent reinforcements to the Menaka area. On March 12, the MSA also claimed to have recaptured Tamalat after one hour of fighting, despite having stated they already recaptured it on March 8. That same day, the Islamic State newspaper An-Naba claimed to have captured Tamalat, Insalane, and Anderamboukane.

=== First Raid on Andéramboukane ===
On March 12, ISGS fighters entered Andéramboukane, cutting off the telephone network and then clashing with MSA and GATIA. The group killed several civilians, ransacked the market, and then left with stolen cattle. They then attacked the village of Etinbaw, but were repelled by MSA and GATIA. The CSP reported that around fifteen Tuareg militants were killed, along with several dozen civilians killed and an unknown number of ISGS fighters. The MSA later reported around a dozen ISGS fighters were killed.

The next day, Malian Army helicopters launched raids on ISGS positions in coordination with the MSA. France 24 reported that while the Malian Army did launch airstrikes near Andéramboukane, it was only after fighting had already ended. On March 14, ISGS gave an ultimatum to civilians in Andéramboukane, ordering them to vacate the city in 72 hours or be massacred. The mayor of Andéramboukane refuted this, claiming that a lone ISGS militant came to the residents and reassured them there won't be any attacks. Despite this, several families fled.

On March 16, ISGS sent a letter to Tuareg factions, stating "If you hold us responsible for individual actions (the assassination of Ag Badjat), we too will remind you of the individuals from your area who have been arrested." ISGS also referred to agreements in 2019 that put an end to clashes between Tuareg groups and ISGS.

=== Role of Operation Barkhane ===
The French forces in Operation Barkhane at the time of the first Menaka offensive were forbidden to help out the Tuareg self-defense groups by the Malian junta, as the French operations would take place on Malian territory. Despite this, French and Czech forces in Task Force Takuba stationed in Menaka claimed to have disrupted jihadist supply networks in Tin-Fadimata and In-Kadewn. On March 24, a French MQ-9 drone struck jihadists in Menaka Cercle, with French authorities announcing around 15 were killed. A Malian helicopter also opened fire on British troops on March 22, but nobody was injured.

== Ansongo offensive ==
On March 21, ISGS stormed the Malian military camp at Tessit, killing 16 Malian soldiers and wounding 18 others, along with 37 jihadists killed. However, this death toll includes the death toll of an ambush by the Malian army against ISGS in Boni. The Islamic State claimed to have killed and wounded dozens in Malian soldiers in the Tessit attack, along with burning the camp down. The Malian garrison in Ansongo came under attack on March 26, with two jihadists and one Malian soldier killed. In response, the Malian government executed 15 Daoussahak civilians that had fled fighting in Talataye. Three or four other people, arrested prior to the Ansongo and Tessit attacks, were executed as well. The Coordination of Azawad Movements denounced the Ansongo massacre, and gave a list of names of the 17 victims.

The Islamic State attacked the village of Labbézanga on March 27, with a CMA spokesman stating that the battle lasted between 11am and 4pm, resulting in dozens of deaths on both sides and ISGS's capture of the village. ISGS posted photos of the clashes the following day, with the bodies of 33 MSA fighters visible. In late March, the Malian Army began joint patrols with MINUSMA in the Ansongo and Menaka region.

On April 3, ISGS claimed responsibility for several attacks carried out against the MSA on March 26. The group claimed to have killed 30 Tuareg fighters, and published photos of eleven corpses. The next day, ISGS claimed to have captured the village of Tikriba on March 27, following a battle with the MSA that killed and injured dozens of MSA fighters. The group claimed that they launched another attack on Insinane on March 28, killing around 100 MSA fighters in the past two days. In June, ISGS claimed responsibility for an attack on April 12 in Petel-Kole. On April 22, Moussa Ag Acharatoumane denounced the Malian junta for their lack of reaction towards the Menaka offensives. The Malian junta had been silent on the campaign since it began.

In late April and early May, the fighting in southeastern Mali had largely died down. By May, the Islamic State in the Greater Sahara controlled several localities - Andéramboukane, Infoukaretane, Tadjalalt, Insinane, and Tamalat. Andéramboukane, which had a population of 20,000 people prior to the offensives, was mostly deserted, along with the other villages. ISGS went back on the offensive in late May, attacking the towns of Aghazrahgen Igadou on May 20, and the villages of Emis-Emis and Inekar on May 22. However, ISGS suffered heavy losses, and retreated back to Inarabane.

Despite being repulsed, ISGS still controlled much of the Malian-Nigerien border in Menaka Cercle. Later, the group claimed near-total control of the Malian-Nigerien border as a result of the attacks at the time, including full control of the only road linking Mali and Niger.

== Battle of Andéramboukane and arrival of Wagner Group ==
In early June, the MSA and GATIA, backed by the Malian Army and commanded by GATIA leader El Hadj Ag Gamou, launched an attack on Andéramboukane. Having been warned about the attack beforehand, the Islamic State retreated from the city and allowed GATIA and the MSA to capture it without a fight. The next day, the Islamic State launched an attack against the city, capturing the town after heavy fighting with the Tuareg militias. Moussa Ag Acharatoumane and Ag Gamou both retreated.

Between June 11 and 12, French forces captured Oumeya Ould Albakaye, a senior ISGS commander, near Tessit. French authorities claimed Albakaye was the head of ISGS in the Gourma and Oudalan provinces on the Malian-Burkinabe border. Albakaye was discovered after fighting between Jama'at Nasr al-Islam wal Muslimin and ISGS revealed his location.

On June 13, French and Czech troops departed the base at Menaka, and handed it over to Malian troops. Around 20-50 Russian soldiers of the paramilitary Wagner Group also settled at the base in Menaka. An MSA commander, on condition of anonymity, told RFI that MSA had had no prior contact with Wagner Group about their arrival, but were willing to work with them anyways. A Wagner drone was shot down on July 15 by the Islamic State.

On June 16, fighting broke out in Emis-Emis, according to the Islamic State. The group also claimed to have killed 145 Tuareg fighters and captured several vehicles and heavy weapons, posting photos to back up their claims. In the Battle of Andéramboukane alone, ISGS claimed to have killed 50 Tuareg fighters, posting 46 corpses as proof.

== Offensive on Ménaka and massacres of Tuaregs ==
By July, kidnappings, extortions, and extrajudicial killings and massacres became more and more commonplace across the Menaka Cercle. Eight people were killed in an early July attack in Tabarat by ISGS, and in Tinabaw the group executed a man and told civilians in the town to flee or be killed. On July 27, two attacks by the Islamic State killed a total of seventeen Daoussahak civilians. The first one, in Tifolat, killed twelve, and the second one, in Inekar Tadriante, killed five. An August 3 ambush by ISGS on a Malian military convoy killed 16 soldiers. Despite the ambush, the Malian government continued to stand by, with analysts suggesting Malian authorities were willing to let the Tuareg self-defense groups, JNIM, and ISGS all fight.

On August 7, ISGS launched an attack on the Malian military camp at Tessit, causing scores of killed Malian soldiers. ISGS also increased their area of control around the city of Menaka, gaining ground very close to the city. Between August 7 and 8, the Islamic State attacked Daoussahak civilians northeast of Menaka, killing over a dozen people. These attacks continued on August 12, when ISGS massacred twenty people at the village of Esseylel, and stole their cattle. Increased cattle raids, including some in the weeks prior near the city of Menaka, helped finance their operations through August and September 2022. The Malian government launched a counterattack in the Tessit area on August 29, killing 44 jihadists.

On September 6, ISGS launched an attack on the town of Talataye, which was jointly controlled by the MSA and JNIM. Dozens of civilians were killed in the attack, and the Islamic State gained control of the town.

== Jama'at Nasr al-Islam wal Muslimin counterattacks ==
Following the defeat at Talataye and massacres of Tuaregs, the Islamic State in the Greater Sahara had full control over Ansongo Cercle and much of the tri-point area between Mali, Niger, and Burkina Faso. The group also began "governance functions", including distributing medicine to locals and destroying alleged supplies of drugs. In response, Jama'at Nasr al-Islam wal Muslimin began expanding its influence across Menaka cercle, in an attempt to defeat the Islamic State via a "hearts and minds" campaign. In late October, JNIM launched a counteroffensive against the Islamic State, with fighting breaking out in Anderamboukane, Insinane, and Tamalat. By the end of October, JNIM had captured Tamalat. Many civilians fled from the areas, and local armed groups supported JNIM.

On October 31, ISGS claimed to have killed 40 JNIM militants in the clashes. JNIM responded by posting images of seventy killed Islamic State fighters, while admitting they lost 30 men. Fighting later broke out in the village of Anchwadj, Gao Region, between GATIA and the Islamic State. GATIA claimed fifteen ISGS fighters were killed in the battle, along with nine Tuareg fighters and four civilians executed. The Islamic State claimed to have killed 14 GATIA fighters, and had none killed on their side.

Later, the Islamic State claimed that JNIM killed 20 Fulani civilians in a massacre near Tamalat. JNIM denied the accusations. On November 12, the two groups clashed in Ndaki, Mali, killing 85 JNIM fighters. Clashes escalated until December 7, when they erupted again in the villages of Tadjalalt and Haroum. In the battles, hundreds of fighters on both sides were killed. Despite this, an extremely large number of Islamic State in the Greater Sahara fighters pledged allegiance to the new caliph, Abu al-Hussein al-Husseini al-Qurashi, in December 2022. Analysts stated that this was the first time such a large gathering of militants had been openly filmed in the tri-point area.

The leader of JNIM, Iyad Ag Ghaly, later appeared in Menaka region on a recruitment campaign against ISGS. Ghaly met with several Daoussahak town leaders, some of whom were part of the Movement for the Salvation of Azawad. In response, an anonymous MSA official stated no Tuareg leaders had defected to JNIM, and that there was no alliance between the two groups asides from when there is a common enemy, such as the battle of Talataye. The lack of attention on the region, and silence from the Malian government, was also a reason young, unemployed Menaka civilians were pressured to join JNIM.

Ghaly also convened a meeting in Djouenhane between the CMA, GATIA, and Malian transitional council members regarding the creation of a non-aggression pact between the groups and JNIM. Several parties signed the pact, pledging to not attack JNIM and focus on ISGS.

On March 1, clashes broke out in Tifandimata between JNIM and ISGS, both sides claiming to have killed dozens of the others.

== Consolidation of the region by the Islamic State ==
In March 2023, following an attack at Intagamey by ISGS, the Nigerien army joined the fight against the Islamic State in the Greater Sahara. Clashes broke out in Tilloa on March 17, and later the Nigerien army captured the ISGS base of Hamakat.

On April 10, 2023, ISGS captured the town of Tidermene without a fight from JNIM. After the fall of Tidermene, almost every cercle in Menaka region came under ISGS control, asides from the city of Menaka. Locals in the area claim that ISGS fighters distribute qurans out to the population, and insist that civilians go about daily life. Around 30,000 refugees from the region fled to other areas, like Gao and Kidal. In Menaka, the city is under a complete siege, with all roads in and out under Islamic State control. By May 2023, all of Menaka region, besides the city, was under ISGS control.

== Impact ==
=== Tamalat and Insinane attacks ===
A Malian military official, in early March 2022, stated that the fighting in Tamalat and Insinane left "many" dead. An anonymous official in Menaka region corroborated this, stating over a hundred civilians and combatants were killed in the three days of fighting. MSA leader Moussa Ag Acharatoumane stated twenty MSA fighters and 40 civilians were killed in the attacks. In mid-March, the mayor of Tamalat announced that a toll of 153 dead and 63 injured, including 25 women and 7 children. The Islamic State claimed the deaths of 250 Tuareg fighters between March 9 and 11. France 24 stated at least 400 Tuaregs were killed. In late March, ISGS shared photos of around 30 Plateforme fighters killed.

=== Talataye massacre ===
In late March, the Coordination of Azawad Movements stated 500 civilians had been killed by ISGS since the beginning of the Menaka offensives. Reuters, citing an anonymous military source, corroborated the CMA. Another government official in Gao region stated that 200 civilians were killed in Talataye alone between March 21 and 25. A United Nations report stated that between March and June, at least 264 civilians had been killed by ISGS.

In July, Acharatoumane estimated up to 1,000 civilians had been killed in massacres. ACLED assessments showed similar numbers in September.

=== Refugees ===
On March 14, 2022, the UNHCR in Mali estimated at least 1,500 people fled the fighting in Menaka. MINUSMA later reported on March 31 that there were significant population displacements in the tri-point area. By the end of May 2022, the UN reported 15,000 IDPs in Mali and 8,000 in Niger. That number climbed to 50,000 IDPs in Menaka city alone by August.
