= Battle of Anéfis (June 2013) =

2013 battle of the Mali War

Battle of Anefis (June 2013)
- Part of Mali War
| Date | June 5, 2013 |
| Location | Anefis, Kidal Region, Mali |
| Result | Malian victory |

Belligerents
| Mali | MNLA |

Commanders and leaders
| Didier Dacko; El Hadj Ag Gamou | Unknown |

Strength
| Several hundred men | 400 men |

Casualties and losses
| 2 injured (per Mali); Six vehicles destroyed with unknown casualties, 12 prisoners (per MNLA); 10 injured (per France) | 2 dead, 2 injured (per MNLA); 30 killed, 28 prisoners (per Mali) |

On June 5, 2013, clashes broke out between the Malian Army and the National Movement for the Liberation of Azawad (MNLA) in the village of Anefis. Malian forces entered and quickly captured the town, leading to diplomatic pushback from the MNLA.

== Background ==
As negotiations between the Malian government and MNLA dragged on in Ouagadougou in mid-2013, the ceasefire on the ground between the two groups worsened on June 2. In Kidal Region, MNLA fighters arrested several people in their area of control. While many were released the next day, around ten to twenty people accused of being spies or Malian soldiers remained in detention. The Malian government accused the MNLA of targeting Songhai, Fulani, and Ikelan minorities, all black groups in the region. Witnesses stated that black residents of Kidal were forced to plead allegiance to the MNLA under duress, or else they would be expelled to Gao. The next day, the MNLA stated that all of those arrested who weren't from Azawad would be sent to Douentza.

The MNLA stated that twenty of the original 180 prisoners were Malians, and would therefore be deported to Douentza. Some of those exiled to Gao stated that while in MNLA detention, they were not given food and were accused of being Malians. On June 4, Malian forces entered the town of Anéfis, on the edge of Kidal Region, with Malian spokesmen stating they were preparing for an offensive in Kidal.

== Battle ==
On June 5, around 5:30am, the Malian Army attacked MNLA positions in Anefis after entering the town the night before. MNLA spokesman Ibrahim Ag Mohamed Assaleh stated that the Malian forces were commanded by Didier Dacko and El Hadj Ag Gamou, and they had around three hundred vehicles and BRDM-2s. Fighting began around fifteen kilometers west of Anefis, and subsided after a few hours. Malian spokesman Souleymane Maiga confirmed Malian control of the city, which was corroborated a few hours later by the MNLA.

Maiga stated that ten MNLA fighters were killed and twenty-eight taken prisoner, and that there were no Malian casualties during the battle. Dacko disputed this, stating that two Malian soldiers received bullet wounds. In a statement on June 6, the Malian government revised the toll and claimed thirty MNLA fighters were killed. MNLA spokesman Moussa Ag Acharatoumane stated that by midday on June 5, two MNLA fighters were killed and two were injured. He also claimed that six armored vehicles were blown up with the Malian soldiers inside, and that a dozen Malian soldiers were taken prisoner. A French military source stated that ten Malian soldiers were wounded in the battle.

== Aftermath ==
The French government condemned the MNLA's arbitrary arrests in Kidal, and called for the MNLA in a second statement on June 5 to lay down their arms. The MNLA denounced France's reactions, and claimed French officials held double standards with the MNLA compared to when France "refrained from making the slightest protest against the daily massacre of Tuaregs and Moors" in Tombouctou and Mopti regions. The MNLA also accused the Malian army of violating the ceasefire negotiated for during the Ouagadougou agreements, which were ongoing.

French forces dispatched ten to twenty men to Anefis to quell tensions there following Mali's capture of the town. They later sent a "protection detachment" of a hundred men.
