= Battle of Kidal (2016) =

Battle between July 21-22, 2016

- Part of Mali War
Date	July 21–22, 2016
Location	Kidal, Mali
Result	CMA victory

Belligerents
GATIA	CMA: HCUA

Commanders and leaders
El Hadj Ag Gamou	Unknown

Casualties and losses
Dozens	Dozens
- 20 killed 35 injured 3,000 displaced

The battle of Kidal took place between July 21 and 22, 2016 between GATIA, a pro-government militia consisting of Imghad Tuaregs, against the Coordination of Azawad Movements, consisting of Ifoghas Tuaregs.

== Prelude ==
On May 21, 2014, the city of Kidal came under control of three Tuareg rebel groups; the National Movement for the Liberation of Azawad (MNLA), High Council for the Unity of Azawad (HCUA), and the Arab Movement of Azawad (MAA) during the Second Battle of Kidal. The rebels came together a few weeks later to form the Coordination of Azawad Movements (CMA), and later signed the Algiers Agreement in 2015. The CMA remained in control of Kidal during the talks, and fighting broke out shortly afterwards between the CMA and the pro-government Platform of the June 14, 2014 movements of Algiers (Platform), which included GATIA. Discussions in Anefif in late 2015 led to Platform and the CMA to cease confrontations.

Between February 1 and 2, 2016, several hundred to a thousand GATIA fighters led by El Hadj Ag Gamou entered Kidal with alleged consent from the CMA. Imghad Tuaregs, which comprise the majority of GATIA, are considered a vassal class of Tuareg by northern Ifoghas Tuaregs, which comprise most of the CMA. Some CMA fighters called the GATIA incursion a show of force, and on February 6, GATIA left the city following negotiations with the CMA.

On June 19, 2016, tensions rose between GATIA and the CMA following GATIA's erection of two checkpoints at the northern and southern entrances to Kidal. HCUA fighters reacted to the checkpoints with warning shots and threatened to dismantle them by force. GATIA agreed to dismantle the checkpoint in the south, but kept the one in the north. Jeune Afrique reported that "for GATIA, it is necessary at all costs to have a military presence in Kidal in order to resolve the crisis [between GATIA and the CMA]." GATIA commander Ag Gamou, who was headquartered in Takellote south of Kidal, was "aiming for the position of president of the regional council of the future interim administration provided for by the Algiers Agreement." Ag Gamou intended to hand over this position to consul of Mali in Niger and former Kidal governor Alhamdou Ag Ilyène. Both GATIA and the CMA accused the governor of Kidal for being too embedded with the other side and wanted a governor more in line with their ideals.

As tensions rose, Malian president Ibrahim Boubacar Keïta asked General Mahamane Touré to urge Ag Gamou to return to Gao, but Touré refused. He was dismissed by IBK on June 29 and replaced with Didier Dacko. On July 17, the CMA and GATIA agreed to share control of Kidal at a meeting in Niamey. In mid-July, a GATIA convoy carrying 1.5 tons of drugs was stopped by CMA fighters in remote areas of Kidal region, souring relations between GATIA and the CMA.

== Battle ==
On the evening of July 19, gunfire broke out in Kidal, and a GATIA fighter, an HCUA officer, and a civilian were killed. Representatives of the two groups urged one another to not break the Niamey treaty. The CMA asked GATIA to not send out armed patrols in the city, but GATIA did it anyway. Fighting broke out at 4pm on July 21 between GATIA and the HCUA in the city center, with both sides accusing the other of initiating the clashes. GATIA brought in reinforcements from Gao and Ménaka that evening, and CMA fighters brought in reinforcements from Tinzaouaten, Tin-Essako, and Aguelhok. The MNLA stated that French helicopters flew over the city during the battle, and that MINUSMA peacekeepers did not interfere. Fighting decreased by 7pm, and ended by nightfall.

The next day, fighting re-erupted around 5am in the western part of Kidal and ended at 10:30 in the morning. Throughout the battle, France and MINUSMA repeatedly called for negotiations.

Calm returned on July 23 after GATIA retreated from the city and withdrew towards Anefif and Gao. MINUSMA then organized patrols in the city. Fahad Ag Almahmoud, a spokesperson for GATIA, said the group retreated after reaching a deal with the CMA. The CMA, on the other hand, stated GATIA lost the battle.

== Aftermath ==
=== Death toll ===
Despite neither side initially offering a death toll, RFI stated several dozen fighters and civilians were killed during the battle. According to testimonies collected by Agence France-Presse, a Kidal resident claimed five CMA fighters were killed and ten GATIA fighters were killed. Almahmoud claimed the deaths of four GATIA fighters, and Almou Ag Mohamed, a spokesperson for the CMA and HCUA, claimed three CMA deaths and many deaths for GATIA. He then clarified this to four CMA deaths, and thirty GATIA deaths. Malian newspaper Le Temoin gave a toll of nine CMA fighters killed and sixty GATIA killed, citing the CMA.

Hospitals in Kidal told Reuters they had seen twenty bodies and around forty injuries, and Studio Tamani reported thirty killed. Malian government sources claimed seventy people were killed, whereas Western observers alleged up to 100 were killed. Malian media Kibaru stated eighty people were killed. CMA president Bilal Ag Acherif claimed on August 4 that the battle left 150 people dead and 100 injured.

The United Nations reported fourteen civilians and combatants were killed on July 21 alone, and eighty-nine were injured. A February 2018 report by OCHA and MINUSMA reported the deaths of twenty civilians on July 21 and 22, and thirty-five injured, including sixteen women raped under suspicion of being CMA sympathizers. OCHA stated fighting displaced 3,000 civilians as well, who fled to Gao or Algeria.

=== Civilian attacks ===
Following the battle, GATIA accused the CMA of arbitrary looting and arrests of civilians. When two civilians were killed near Kidal on July 26, GATIA blamed the CMA. A CMA report from September 2016 accused GATIA of sixty-three abuses, which MINUSMA corroborated the majority of, although claimed that the CMA committed some.

=== Renewed clashes in Touzik and Adjlal ===
Clashes broke out in Touzik, south of Kidal, on July 30, leading to the deaths of several fighters on both sides. Despite a treaty, further clashes renewed in Adjlal in August.
