= Battle of Imenas =

Coordinates: 16.3000°N 0.7167°E

- Part of the Northern Mali conflict
Date	27 February – 1 March 2013 (2 days)
Location	Near Gao, Mali
Result	French-Malian victory

Belligerents
France; Mali	Movement for Oneness and Jihad in West Africa; Al-Mulathameen

Commanders and leaders
(France) Bruno Bert (Mali) El Hadj Ag Gamou	

Strength
400	100–200

Casualties and losses
2 injured	52 killed

The Battle of Imenas was an armed confrontation between French-Malian forces and the Jihadists terrorist groups, Movement for Oneness and Jihad in West Africa and Al-Mulathameen. The battle was a decisive Franco-Malian victory, as it resulted, according to the French and the Malian governments, in 52 Islamists being killed, with no government forces being killed.

== Background and deployment ==
Gao was captured by French and Malian troops on 27 January 2013, about a month before this battle. However, unlike Ansar Dine and Al-Qaeda in Islamic Maghreb, which retreated to the Adrar des Ifoghas, the Movement for Oneness and Jihad in West Africa and Mulathamen remained in the Gao region. They tried to take back the city, in two attempted operations before, first on 10 February, and then again on 20 February, but their attacks failed. However, French and Malian forces, wished to secure the region, and fully expel the MUJAO-Mulathamen coalition from the Gao and its regions, so they began interrogating captured jihadists to learn information about the positions and the number of the jihadists.

Finally the staff of Operation Serval estimated that about 100 fighters divided into several small groups were located east of Gao, between Djebok and al-Moustarat. French code-named Operation Doro was launched on 27 February, with the aim of destroying Islamist groups around Gao. The French deployed the GTIA 2, based in Gao and commanded by Colonel Bruno Bert, the leader of the 92nd Infantry Regiment. The Malian army deployed 200 soldiers under the command of Colonel-Major El Hadj Ag Gamou. The jihadist forces were mainly from MUJAO, with some possibly al-Mulathamen elements may also be involved in the clashes, as some days before, AQIM stated that the head of the Mulathamen, Mokhtar Belmokhtar, was fighting in the Gao region. After the battle, Colonel Bert estimated the Islamist fighters to number from 100 to 200 fighters.

== Offensive ==
The Franco-Malian column left the airport of Gao in the night of the 27th, with plans to approach Imenas from the north, but column was quickly spotted by Islamist scouts, who on board pickups or motorcycles monitored the movements of the column. Along the way, the French and Malians were conducting excavations in the region, but slowed by heavy fuel consumption and obsolete maps, Colonel Bert finally decided to approach Imenas from the south. On 1 March around 4 a.m., 200 French soldiers supported by 16 armored vehicles and 200 Malian soldiers approached Imenas from the south. Hidden by thick fog, they were not immediately spotted by jihadists. The fight begun half an hour later when a VBCI spotted and fired to a group of three jihadists.

Surprised, the jihadists entered their pickups and retreated from the village after a brief fight. Around 6 a.m., Imenas was surrounded by the Franco-Malian forces, as three VBCI were deployed, one of which is supported in the south-east by teams of mortar servers and snipers. The French and Malian soldiers then took control of the village and the engineers carry out searches for traps and bombs left by the Islamists. However the French intercepted a phone call, that showed them that someone had alerted the Jihadists. Meanwhile, the soldiers found nothing in the village, except a camouflaged pickup. At that time, the Gazelle and Puma helicopters arrived from Gao. After unsuccessful searches, the Malians decided to head to the forest that stretched from north-east to south-east of Imenas. Around 10:30 a.m., Tuareg soldiers on their pickups headed towards the forest, followed by some French soldiers. However, as the Franco-Malian forces arrived at the beginning of the forest, Jihadists attacked them from multiple fronts with AKs and RPGs.

The French were surprised by the attack, especially since a drone had flown over the forest for about without finding anything suspicious. The command post of Colonel Bert was also attacked, and Bert retreated under the cover of snipers, that killed three Islamists. The French then decided to abandon their positions, to take down the jihadists engaged in the shooting against the Malians with only nine snipers left behind. About fifty jihadists then rushed towards them and started to approach them undetected, but the snipers spotted them, and killed 7 of them. Some LAV-25s arrived as reinforcements and, at about 11:40 a.m., four VBCI armored vehicles captured one side of the forest. They climbed the slope at full speed and then opened fire once they reached the top while 40 soldiers came out of the tanks and engaged the Jihadists. The jihadists suffered heavy losses, but they continued their attacks. The fight ended around 5 p.m., with some skirmishes lasting until nightfall. The next day at dawn, the French and Malians captured the forest, abandoned by the jihadists.
