= Battle of Kidal =

The Battle of Kidal could refer to

- Battle of Kidal (2006)
- Battle of Kidal (2012)
- Battle of Ifoghas, in the Ifoghas mountains of Kidal Region
- Second Battle of Kidal
- Battle of Kidal (2016)
- Battle of Kidal (2023)
