= El Hadj Ag Gamou =

Malian army officer and governor (born 1964)

- Born: December 31, 1964 (age 61); Tidermene, Menaka, Mali
- Allegiance: Libya (1980-1988); Revolutionary Liberation Army of Azawad (1990-1995); Mali (1996-present); GATIA (2014-present)
- Rank: Brigadier general Inspector General of the Malian Army (2019-2021); Governor of Kidal Region (2023-present)
- Conflicts: Lebanese Civil War; Toyota War; Tuareg rebellion (1990-1996); Sierra Leonean Civil War; Tuareg rebellion (2007-2009): Operation Djiguitugu; Mali War: Tinsalane ambush; Battle of Kidal (2012); Second Battle of Anefif; Second Battle of Kidal; Fourth Battle of Gao; Battle of Kidal (2016); Ménaka offensive; Battle of Andéramboukane (2022)

El Hadj Ag Gamou (born December 31, 1964) is an Imghad Tuareg Malian division general. Gamou is currently the governor of Kidal Region since November 22, 2023, and has also been the head of his faction of Imghad Tuareg Self-Defense Group and Allies since the group's foundation. Prior to his governorship, Gamou served in the Malian army, commanding Malian troops against Ansar Dine and the National Movement for the Liberation of Azawad (MNLA) in the early stages of the Mali War.

== Early life and combat ==
Gamou was born to a family of shepherds in Tidermene, Ménaka, Mali. He is an Imghad Tuareg, which is considered a vassal tribe according to traditional Tuareg hierarchies. In 1980, at the age of 16, Gamou joined the Libyan Army's Islamic Legion, where he met Iyad Ag Ghaly. After a year of training in Libya, and a subsequent six-month stint in Syria with special forces, Gamou served in the Lebanese Civil War alongside the Palestinians. He then returned to Libya after a few years of fighting, before taking part in the Toyota War.

Gamou returned to Mali in 1988. During the Tuareg rebellion of 1990–1996, Gamou fought in the separatist Revolutionary Liberation Army of Azawad. He fell out with Iyad Ag Ghaly in 1994, who was then leading the People's Movement for the Liberation of Azawad (MPA). Gamou's first wife then remarried Ghaly, but this was likely because of personal rivalries and ambitions. Gamou abducted Intallah Ag Attaher, the amenokal of the Ifoghas Tuaregs, of which Ghaly belonged to. While Attaher was later released, Ifoghas leaders held a grudge against Gamou.

== Rise to power in the Malian Army ==
Satisfied with the peace accords that ended the Tuareg rebellion in 1996, Gamou joined the Malian Armed Forces later that year. He trained at the Koulikoro military school, and upon his release was assigned to Ségou Region as a staff officer. Gamou served as a UNAMSIL peacekeeper in 1999 during the Sierra Leone Civil War. When he returned to Mali in 2000, he was promoted to lieutenant colonel and awarded the military valor medal. He was assigned to Gao in 2001, and later Kidal in 2005.

During Gamou's tenure in Kidal, the Niger-Mali Tuareg Alliance led by Ibrahim Ag Bahanga rose up. Gamou led Operation Djiguitugu, which destroyed several ATNM bases. Around this time, Gamou was considered a trusted confidant of Malian president Amadou Toumani Touré, being appointed deputy chief of staff in 2010. Gamou encouraged Toure to appoint Arabs and Tuaregs to military positions in northern Mali.

Gamou was accused of protecting Baba Ould Cheikh, a Lemhar Arab trader and mayor of Tarkint who participated in the "Air Cocaine" scandal, which occurred when a Boeing 727 filled with cocaine arrived in Gao from Venezuela. Gamou's protection of Cheikh sparked protests from Gao residents in 2012. In 2015, Gamou's daughter married Cherif Ould Taher, another Lemhar Arab affiliated with the Air Cocaine scandal.

== Tuareg rebellion of 2012 ==
In 2011, during the Libyan civil war, 2,000 to 4,000 Tuaregs serving in the Libyan Army returned to Mali. Toure instructed Gamou to entice the returning Tuaregs into the Malian Army, which had partial success, as some Tuaregs joined what would soon become the National Movement for the Liberation of Azawad.

At the time of the rebellion, Gamou was a colonel-major commanding over Kidal Region. At the Battle of Aguelhok on January 17, the entire Malian Army garrison massacred by the separatists. Gamou led reinforcements from Kidal to recapture the town the following day, at which point the rebels had already abandoned. Gamou attempted to break the siege of Tessalit in early February, but failed. When heading back to Kidal on February 11, Gamou was ambushed at Tissalane. Both sides claimed victory. Tessalit fell to the rebel coalition a month later.

At the end of March 2012, when Kidal was attacked by the rebels, Gamou and his contingent of 500-600 men abandoned the city and retreated south. While headed towards Gao, which had come under attack by rebels on March 31, Gamou was intercepted by the MNLA. He agreed to join the MNLA, but refused to allow 204 of his men to be conscripted into the MNLA. Instead of jointing, Gamou fled towards Niger, where he called the Malian consulate in Niger to ask for reinforcements to repatriate his men via Burkina Faso. Gamou then fled his family to Niger, and informed the Malian government his intent to join the MNLA was instead a ruse to flee, reaffirming his commitment to the Malian state.

On December 2, 2012, Gamou was the target of an assassination attempt in Niamey by a young jihadist. Three or four bullets were fired, two wounding Gamou in the thigh and one ricocheting off his phone. The suspect, who later announced his affiliation with Al-Qaeda in the Islamic Maghreb (AQIM) was overpowered by Gamou, his bodyguard, and driver.

== 2013 Malian counteroffensive and Battles of Kidal ==
Gamou remained in Niger for 10 months, returning in January 2013 during Operation Serval. His militia of 700 Tuaregs, 500 of whom were Imghad Tuaregs, were gradually integrated into the Malian Army. Gamou captured Ménaka bloodlessly on January 15, 2013. In late January or early February, Gamou entered Gao, which had been captured by the French not long before. Gamou and French troops recaptured Menaka on February 12, again without a fight, after the MNLA captured it on February 5. Shortly afterward, the MNLA accused French troops of firing upon a convoy carrying Abdoul Karim Ag Matafa, the minister of health for the Transitional Council of the Azawad State. The group threatened to attack the French forces, but did not.

Gamou engaged in direct combat with MUJAO during the Fourth Battle of Gao. In late February 2013, nineteen men from Gamou's militia served as French guides during the Battle of Tigharghar. He was recalled to Bamako that March over differences with French forces over the role of the MNLA. In September, Gamou captured Anefif alongside Malian army general Didier Dacko. He was promoted to brigadier general on September 18.

On the night between November 18 and 19, two members of Gamou's family were murdered and two more were injured in the village of Intakabar. Gamou, who was in Bamako at the time, asserted that the perpetrators were Fulani from MUJAO.

Between May 17 and 21, 2014, Gamou commanded Malian forces during the second and third battles of Kidal. Faisal Ag Kiba, Gamou's right-hand man, was killed in the third battle on May 21.

== Imghad Tuareg Self-Defense Group and Allies (GATIA) ==
In August 2014, Gamou founded GATIA, a pro-government Imghad Tuareg militia. Gamou did not officially sponsor the militia, however, due to his role in the Malian Army. Several prominent members of the Malian army criticized Gamou for this, claiming he went off his own interests. Malian president Ibrahim Boubacar Keïta did not fully trust Gamou, but tolerated him due to support from Dacko, who was chief of staff.

GATIA and the Coordination of Azawad Movements fought in Kidal in late 2015, before signing the Algiers Accords in October 2015. In 2016, the CMA allowed GATIA and Gamou to enter Kidal, establishing a presence in Takellote. Clashes soon broke out in the city between the Imghads of GATIA and the Ifoghas of the High Council for the Unity of Azawad. Following the battle, Gamou was forced out of the city.

Following a counteroffensive against the Islamic State in the Greater Sahara in 2017 by the French Army, Malian Army, GATIA, and the Movement for the Salvation of Azawad, ISGS caliph Adnan Abu Walid al-Sahrawi threatened Gamou, Moussa Ag Acharatoumane, and the Idaksahak and Imghad Tuaregs.

Gamou was appointed Inspector General of the Malian Army in February 2019, but was removed by Assimi Goïta in 2021. Gamou was seriously injured in the arm in an ISGS ambush during the Battle of Andéramboukane.

During a Malian army counteroffensive against the Coordination of Azawad Movements and CSP-PSD, Gamou assisted in capturing Kidal. He was subsequently appointed governor of the region on November 22, 2023.
