= Battle of Tabarde =

- Part of the Mali War
Date	3–5 June 2018 (3 days)
Location	Tabarde, Ménaka Region, Mali
Result	GATIA / MSA victory

Belligerents
GATIA; MSA	ISIL: Islamic State in the Greater Sahara

Commanders and leaders
El Hadj Ag Gamou	Amat Ag Assalate †; Almahmoud Ag Akawkaw (POW)

Casualties and losses
3 killed, 3 wounded	6+ killed, dozens wounded or captured

The Battle of Tabarde was fought over three days from 3 to 5 June 2018, between ISIL militants and a Tuareg coalition that consisted of the Imghad Tuareg Self-Defense Group and Allies (GATIA) and the Movement for the Salvation of Azawad (MSA).

== Timeline ==
On 3 June 2018, Tuareg GATIA/MSA fighters clashed with ISIL militants under the command of Amat Ag Assalate and Almahmoud Ag Akawkaw, in the Tabarde area of Mali's northern Ménaka Region. The two ISIL commanders were responsible for an earlier ambush on a Malian convoy in Inkadogotane in July 2017. The fighting lasted for three days, and afterwards, the Tuaregs claimed that three are their fighters were killed, while three others were wounded, and that at least six ISIL militants were also killed and many others were captured. Weapons and vehicles were also reportedly captured by the Tuaregs. Almahmoud Ag Akawkaw was captured after the battle, while Amat Ag Assalate was killed during the fighting.
