= Battle of In-Delimane (2018) =

Battle in the Mali War

- Part of the Mali War
Date	12 January – 6 March 2018 (1 month, 3 weeks and 1 day)
Location	In-Delimane, Gao Region, Mali
Result	GATIA / MSA victory: Adnan Abu Walid al-Sahrawi evades capture

Belligerents
GATIA; MSA; Supported by: France	JNIM Islamic State in the Greater Sahara

Commanders and leaders
El Hadj Ag Gamou	Adnan Abu Walid al-Sahrawi; Djibo Hamma †

Casualties and losses
Unknown; 2 killed, 4 wounded	20+ killed or captured

The Battle of In-Delimane was a series of armed clashes in the area of In-Delimane in the Gao Region of Mali.

== Timeline ==
On 12 January 2018, a suicide bomber blew himself up near a patrol of French soldiers in In-Delimane, wounding three soldiers. No group claimed responsibility, but ISIL was suspected. About a month later on 21 February 2018, two French soldiers were killed, and a third wounded, after an IED exploded during their patrol. The Al-Qaeda affiliate JNIM claimed responsibility afterwards. Two days later on 23 February 2018, the Imghad Tuareg Self-Defense Group and Allies (GATIA) and the Movement for the Salvation of Azawad (MSA), in collaboration with France, launched an operation to capture or kill Abu Walid al-Sahrawi, the ISIL commander in Mali. Six jihadists were killed or captured while one vehicle originally belonging to the Nigerien military was recovered; however Sahrawi managed to evade capture.

On 6 March 2018, a combined group of GATIA and MSA fighters fought ISIL forces in the Tinzouragan area, close to Delimane, resulting in the deaths of five jihadists, including one high level commander named Djibo Hamma. Ten other militants and vehicles were captured. On the same day, French forces fought with an unspecified group of jihadists, killing three of them.
