= December 2022 Ménaka region clashes =

Armed conflict in Gao Region, Mali

- Part of the JNIM-ISGS war in the Mali War
Date	December 3–10, 2022
Location	Tadjalalt, Haroum, N'Tillit, and surrounding villages, Gao Region, Mali
Result	Inconclusive: JNIM captures ISGS base in Fitili; Battles in Tadjalalt and Haroum end in status quo ante bellum

Belligerents
Jama'at Nasr al-Islam wal Muslimin	Islamic State in the Greater Sahara

Commanders and leaders
Iyad ag Ghali	Unknown

Strength
~700	Unknown

Casualties and losses
100 (per ISGS)	73+ (per JNIM)
- 70+ civilians killed

Between December 3 and 10, 2022, militants from Islamic State in the Greater Sahara and al-Qaeda-linked Jama'at Nasr al-Islam wal Muslimin clashed in eastern Mali, at the river between the towns of Tadjalalt and Haroum.

== Prelude ==
While originally allies against the Malian government throughout the Mali War, since 2020 JNIM and ISGS have clashed in Mali due to ideological differences. In March 2022, ISGS went on an offensive against the Malian government, Tuareg rebels, and JNIM. In May 2022, the two groups agreed to a truce, although this truce expired sometime in September. Clashes between ISGS and JNIM in particular escalated in November, with fighting in Gao and Timbuktu regions killing an unknown amount of fighters. A Tuareg source speaking to Le Monde stated that JNIM usually sends soldiers out one wave at a time, with each wave containing around 700 soldiers.

== Battle ==
In the rural village of N'Tillit, fighting began on December 3 between the two groups, with 583 households being displaced. On December 4, clashes flared up in the village of Tin Djiridjitane, with JNIM capturing the ISGS base of Fitili. These clashes were just 15 kilometers away from a Malian army base in Tessit. The commander of a local Tuareg militia, Fahad Ag al-Mahmoud, claimed the battle near Fitili inflicted heavy casualties on both sides, with JNIM ultimately winning. al-Mahmoud alleged that following the battle, the remnants of the ISGS fighters dispersed, and JNIM committed massacres on December 5 in the towns of Idarfan and Alabadje, killing around 70 people.

Clashes resumed between the two groups in the villages of Tadjalalt and Haroum on December 7, with the battles being the heaviest of the clashes. In the battle, A Malian air force jet was alleged to have flown over the battlefield during the battle. Fighting in the towns lasted until December 10, with JNIM claiming to have killed over seventy-three ISGS fighters in Haroum alone. Conversely, ISGS claimed to have killed a hundred JNIM soldiers. Due to the heavy losses from the battles, both jihadist groups returned to their positions by the Malian-Burkinabe and Nigerien-Malian borders. Low-intensity skirmishes continued until December 13.
