= Siege of Tessalit =

2012 battle in the Mali War

Coordinates: 20.2572°N 0.9911°E

- Part of the Tuareg rebellion (2012)
- Siege of Tessalit (Mali)
Date	18 January–11 March 2012 (1 month, 3 weeks and 1 day)
Location	Tessalit, Kidal Region, Mali
Result	MNLA victory

Belligerents
Mali: Malian Army	Azawad: MNLA; Ansar Dine; AQIM

Commanders and leaders
(Mali) Didier Dacko (Mali) El Hadj Ag Gamou (Mali) Mohamed Ould Meydou (Mali) Kassim Goita (Mali) Mohamed Ag Bachir (Mali) Yusuf Ag Bougara (POW)	(Azawad) Bayes Ag Dicknane; Abou Al-Tayyib; Cheikh Ag Aoussa (Azawad) Abdelkim Kojak (Azawad) Ibah Ag Moussa (Azawad) Assalat Ag Habi

Strength
800 regular soldiers 107 vehicles 6 BRDM several helicopters 300 reinforcements	600 fighters 30 vehicles

Casualties and losses
32–49 killed 20+ wounded 62–71 captured 21 vehicles destroyed 6 vehicles captured 2 BRDM-2 captured 1 BRDM-2 destroyed	7–17 fighters killed 6-8 wounded 7 captured 1 vehicle destroyed

The siege of Tessalit occurred in early 2012 during the Tuareg rebellion in Mali. Amachach military base, located in Tessalit, was defended by roughly 800 Malian soldiers commanded by Colonel Kassim Goita. The International Committee of the Red Cross was sent to help evacuate civilians and military families, but despite the approval of the National Movement for the Liberation of Azawad (MNLA), Malian authorities delayed the operation and it was never executed as a humanitarian source. Other Malian military forces in the region of Tessalit were led by Colonels' Didier Dacko, Ould Meydou, and the well respected Tuareg commander El Hadji Ag Gamou.

== Siege ==
On 18 January 2012, Tessalit came under attack by both MNLA and Ansar Dine rebels. According to Malian soldiers, fighters from al-Qaeda in the Islamic Maghreb (AQIM) were present.

On 22 January, the MNLA announced they had surrounded the Malian army base in Tessalit and expected all foreign military trainers to evacuate the premises. The Amachach military camp is located about fifteen kilometers from Tessalit itself. In a separate clash with the Malian army, two rebels were killed and a vehicle destroyed. By then, the number of MNLA fighters reached around 600 with reinforcements arriving from Libya and Niger.

On February 6, the rebels evacuated people from the town of Tessalit (about 4,000 people) to bush encampments in Abamco, Savohak, Efali (Terist) and Assowa to prevent them from becoming victims of the conflict. The health situation was bad, which caused a mission of the Red Cross on February 7.

On 10 February, the Malian army launched an offensive to relieve the garrison in Tessalit, after a two-week-long siege. The army deployed 107 all-terrain vehicles, six BRDM armored vehicles, and combat helicopters piloted by foreign mercenaries. The MNLA became aware of Malian army movements in the area, launching their own offensive, eventually meeting the Army in the village of Tinsalane, 20 kilometers south of Tessalit. According to the MNLA, the planned transport convoy carrying Malian soldiers from the towns of Kidal and Anefif to strengthen the garrison of Tessalit, was ambushed by a brigade of the MNLA. After several hours of fighting, Malian forces fled, leaving 17 dead and 14 prisoners, including their commander Yusuf Ag Bougara, along with six vehicles destroyed and four captured. According to residents of In-Kahlil located along the border with Algeria, dozens of rebel vehicles filled with injured fighters were accepted in Algerian hospitals. The Malian government announced the same day, that the army defeated the rebels killing a hundred and capturing 50 which differs from the MNLA's previous claim of only losing four men. The overall outcome of the confrontation is disputed over with both sides, but it seems to have been more in favor of the rebels, as a month later Tessalit fell.

Fighting continued on 13 and 14 February, and the Malian army claimed that it have managed to enter Tessalit, then refuel the Amachach camp, which the rebels deny it happened.

On 28 and 29 February, a new counteroffensive was launched by 300 soldiers of the Malian forces commanded by Colonels Didier Dacko, El Hadj Ag Gamou, and Abderahman Ould Meydou and Mohamed Ag Bachir, a former Libyan army leader. This attack on the outskirts of Tessalit was, however, repulsed by MNLA troops commanded by colonels Abdelkim Kojak, Assalat Ag Habi and Ibah Ag Moussa. On 29 February, the Malian defenders of Amachach military base launched several raids of their own in an attempt to break the rebel siege, with the elements of the outside reinforcements. The MNLA cited that none of their fighters were killed during the clashes where as the Malian army sustained losses. Clashes continued through 1 March, when the Malian army attacked MNLA positions surrounding the base, but failed in any way to diverge the rebels from the siege.

On 2 March, the MNLA announced that a total of 32 Malian soldiers have been killed, 20 wounded, and three vehicles destroyed in clashes over the past two weeks, leaving only seven dead and seven taken as prisoners in their ranks.

On 4 March, the Malian army launched a second attempt to break the rebel siege of Tessalit, with Colonels Dacko, Gamou and Meydou sending reinforcements to Tessalit, backed by combat helicopters. The attack was eventually repulsed after twelve hours of fighting, but a helicopter was able to reach the Amachach military base to help collect the dead and wounded soldiers, with some bodies already in a state of decomposing. On 8 March, according to local sources in the town of In-Khalil, eight MNLA combatants died of the wounds they received in clashes with the army, with a ninth being taken to an Algerian hospital in Bordj Badji Mokhtar.

On 10 March, in the early evening, the MNLA launched their final assault on camp Amachach. Fighting continued until 11 March, when the Malian army fled their military base, leaving behind hundreds of weapons, mortars, rocket launchers, machine guns, and even tanks. Around 57 Malian soldiers, five officers (two commanders, two lieutenants, and one captain) were captured, with 10 vehicles and two BRDM's recovered. An important military arsenal along with a BRDM were both destroyed. The Malian army talked that their forces made a strategic withdrawal and evacuation of the Amachach military camp to shelter to civilians who had sought refuge and to prevent a massacre.

== Aftermath ==
After the rebel victory, the Malian army retreated to Gao taking with them close to 800 people, mostly Black Africans with only 30 being Tuareg. The MNLA released a statement promising that they will treat their prisoners according to the Geneva Conventions of 1949, with a sick Malian soldier being handed over to Algerian authorities for care and 20 military families were handed over to the International Committee of the Red Cross. The Malian government responded to their defeat by calling on the International Community, saying that the humanitarian situation is deteriorating with crimes being committed by the rebels against civilians. In the statement it also indicated, that the army fled Tessalit in part that it was unnecessary casualties to continue the prolonged battle.
