= Battle of Tabrichat =

- Part of Mali War
Date	January 28 and February 4, 2015
Location	Tabrichat, Kidal Region, Mali
Result	Indecisive: Both CMA and GATIA claim victory

Belligerents
GATIA	MAA

Casualties and losses
None (per GATIA); 7 killed, 2 POWs (per CMA)	6–8 killed, 2 pick-ups destroyed

On January 28 and February 4, 2015, pro-government Imghad Tuareg GATIA fighters attacked a base staffed by Arab Movement of Azawad (MAA) fighters in Tabrichat, Mali.

== Prelude ==
Between January 16 and 20, just a week prior to the attack, Tuareg rebels under the Coordination of Azawad Movements (CMA) coalition attacked the town of Tabankort, which was under the control of the pro-government Platform coalition spearheaded by GATIA. The attack failed, and the CMA was forced to retreat.

== Battle ==
Platform forces launched an attack on MAA fighters in Tabrichat at 12:42am on January 28. GATIA claimed that seven of their vehicles attacked Tabrichat, killing eight MAA fighters and destroying two of their vehicles, with no personnel or material losses for GATIA. However, the CMA disputed this version of events, claiming that eight to nine men attacked their camp. Six or seven of those were killed in the attack, including four suicide bombers. The CMA admitted the deaths of six of their fighters and the destruction of two vehicles. They also claimed that an Algerian national was among the attackers, and that the prisoners captured by GATIA were Fulani Malians.

The CMA then accused GATIA of working with narco-terrorists. GATIA denied their usage of suicide bombings during the attack, although Western and United Nations observers stated that suicide bombers were embedded in GATIA. MINUSMA confirmed the details of the attack, but did not give a casualty assessment.

Clashes resumed on February 4 in Tabrichat, with both GATIA and the CMA claiming victory. GATIA claimed the capture of Tabrichat, and the deaths of ten MNLA fighters and four prisoners, along with no GATIA casualties.
