= Fourth Battle of Gao =

2013 battle in the Northern Mali Conflict

Coordinates: 16.2667°N 0.0500°W

- Part of Northern Mali conflict
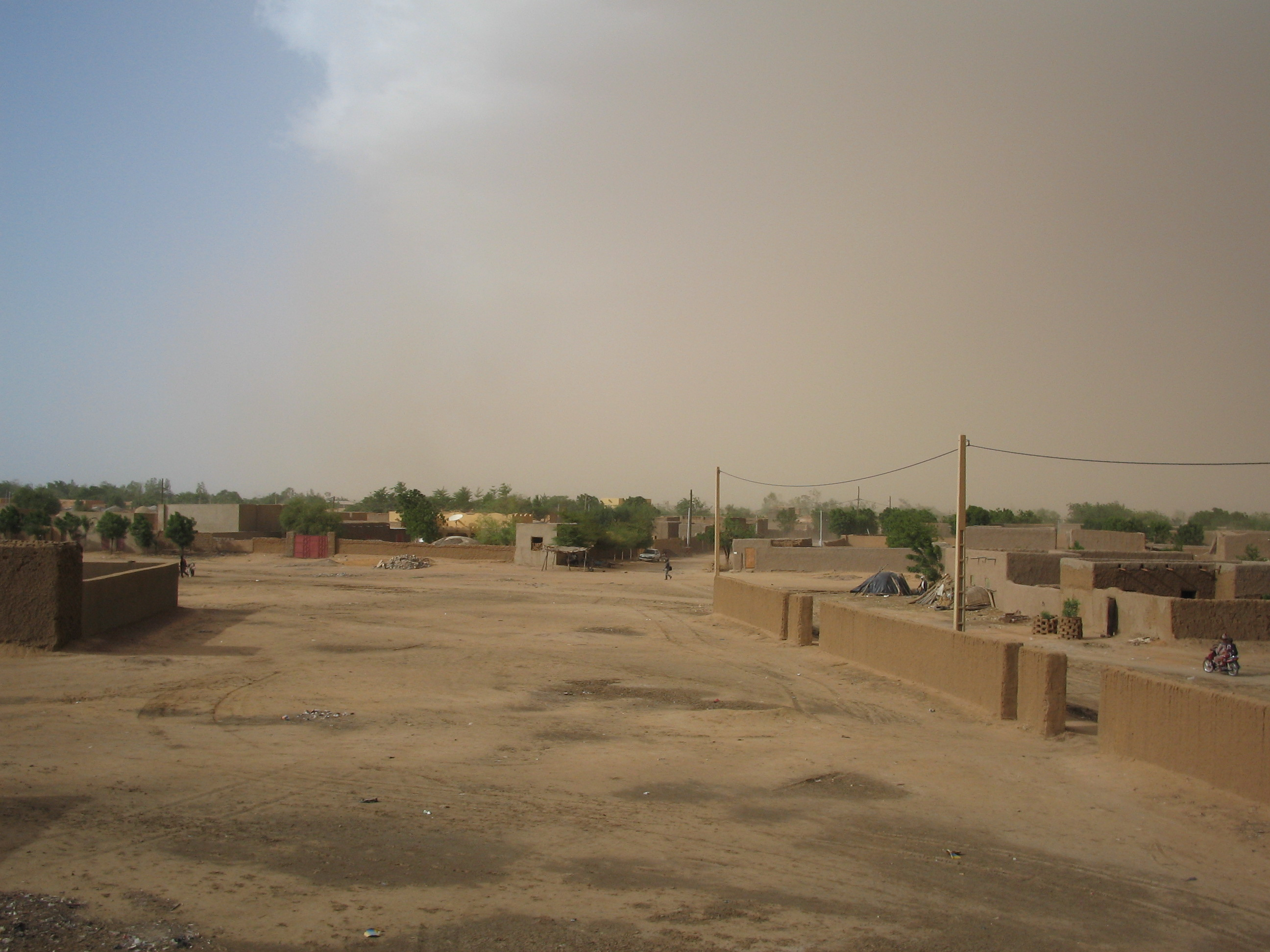
Date	20–22 February 2013 (2 days)
Location	Gao, Mali
Result	French-Malian Victory

Belligerents
Mali; France; Niger	MOJWA; Al-Mourabitoun

Commanders and leaders
(Mali) Mamadou Samaké (Mali) El Hadj Ag Gamou (France) Bruno Bert	Hamada Ould Mohamed Kheirou

Strength
(Mali) 1,000 (France) 200, 2 Gazelle helicopters (Niger) 500	40

Casualties and losses
(Mali) 5 wounded (France) 2 wounded	16 killed 2 prisoners

The Fourth Battle of Gao was fought in the city of Gao on 20–22 February 2013, during the Northern Mali Conflict. It was an attempt by rebel MOJWA forces to retake the city. The attempt was repelled by Malian government forces with the support of troops from France and Niger.

== February 20–22 attack ==
Ten days after the Third Battle of Gao, the Jihadists launched another offensive to retake the city on 20 February 2013. At around 22:00-23:00 local time, MOJWA and Mourabitun fighters began exchanging fire with a group of Malian soldiers patrolling through the streets. Fighting had then escalated when MOJWA fighters seized the palace of Independence and the palace of Justice. The fighting continued all through the night between Islamists, Malian and Nigerien troops supported by French helicopters. The fighting took place in Ward 4, north of the city and in the city center near the town hall. During the night, the jihadists crossed the river Niger with canoes and came close to the city center. They then seized the town hall and the governor's house. The clash took place near the city hall and the courthouse as well as North and South entrances of the city. Abu Walid Sahraoui, MOJWA spokesman, told the AFP: "Our troops were ordered to attack. If the enemy is stronger, we will return back for more, until the release of Gao." It does not specify the number of attackers, but there was an estimate of forty Islamists according to the Malian military and thirty according to the French.

At 7:00, the Islamists got to Independence Square, and the courthouse was burned, as well as a gas station, and the fire spread to the central market where many stalls were destroyed. Malian forces were commanded by Colonel Major Dacko, and consisted of the police forces and the National Guard. MOJWA fighters were hiding in the town hall and nearby buildings, they were positioned on the roofs and windows were equipped with several sniper rifles according to Malian soldiers. In the morning, at 3:00, the Malian forces surrounded and besieged Islamist positions, they opened fire with heavy machine guns and rocket-propelled grenades. At around noon, an armored column of the Malian army pushed to the Town Hall. Malians were then reinforced by 200 French soldiers of the 92nd French Infantry Regiment which came from the international airport Gao Korogoussou where French forces are based. The French then sent the QRF GTIA 2 composed of a section of VABs, and three companies of VBCI and two gazelle helicopters. The group was led by Colonel Bert, head of the task force. The French positioned near the town hall, and the company of VBCI opened fire with all weapons: canon 25mm, AT4, ALI, Eryx. They were supported by two Gazelles, which fired a missile. Soldiers of the Tuareg groups under Ag Gamou Colonel also arrived as reinforcements. They opened fire with small arms before deploying on the banks of the river. Elements of the Quick Reaction Force positioned themselves on the terrace of the Regional Assembly of Gao, which adjoins the courthouse. For 8 hours in total, Malians and the French besieged the city hall where the jihadists were entrenched. Malians deployed six pick-ups equipped with heavy machine guns.

Along with fighting in the town center, the checkpoint north of the city, defended by soldiers from Niger, was harassed by jihadist groups. Islamists were repelled, with two of them killed. Calm was restored late afternoon, and the French soldiers returned to the airport. The Islamists were ousted from the city hall and the governorate and the town hall was bombed by a French helicopter. However, a few shots continued to be heard on the morning of 22nd.
