= Tinsalane ambush =

Coordinates: 20.2572°N 0.9911°E

Ambush of Tinsalane
- Part of the 2012 Tuareg rebellion
- Tinsalane ambush (Mali)
Date	11 February 2012
Location	Between Kidal and Tessalit
Result	Indecisive: Both sides claim victory.

Belligerents
Mali: Malian Army	Azawad: MNLA; Ansar Dine

Commanders and leaders
(Mali) El Haji Ag Gamou (Mali) Yusuf Ag Bougara (POW)	Cheikh Ag Aoussa (Azawad) Ibah Ag Moussa (Azawad) Assalat Ag Habi

Strength
Several hundred soldiers 107 vehicles 6 BRDM-1 several helicopters	Unknown

Casualties and losses
17 killed 14 captured 6 vehicles destroyed 4 vehicles captured (according to the MNLA)	4 wounded (according to the MNLA); 100 killed 50 prisoners 70 vehicles destroyed (according to Mali)

The ambush of Tinsalane occurred on February 11, 2012, when armed groups of Ansar Dine and the National Movement for the Liberation of Azawad (MNLA) fought against a convoy of the Malian army who came to reinforce the troops besieged in Tessalit.

== The ambush ==
On February 10, 2012, the Malian army launched an offensive to rescue the garrison of Amachach camp, near Tessalit, besieged by the rebels. The army deployed on the ground 107 all-terrain vehicles, 6 BRDMs, as well as helicopters piloted by Ukrainian mercenaries. The ambush took place in Tinsalane, 20 kilometers south of Tessalit.

According to Malian military sources, "The aim was to attract as many rebels as possible to the army, then to use combat helicopters to pound enemy positions (...) We chose to fight at Tessalit, because we could quickly transfer injured in Gao thanks to the airport that we control again since the weekend. " According to officers of the Malian army, more than 100 rebels have been killed, 50 taken prisoner and 70 vehicles destroyed.

According to reports from sources close to the MNLA, on the morning of February 11, 2012, a convoy of Malian soldiers and militia departed the cities of Kidal and Anfif and moved towards Tessalit to strengthen the military forces of the besieged city. However, this convoy was ambushed by an MNLA brigade in Tinsalane. After several hours of fighting, the Malian forces fled, leaving 17 dead and 14 prisoners including commander Yousouf Ag Bougara. Six vehicles were destroyed and four captured. According to an MNLA spokesman, Hama Ag Sidahmed, the losses of the separatists were only 4 wounded.

According to a resident of the city of Alkhalil, on the border with Algeria, the drivers of about 25 rebel vehicles were left wounded, and sought admission to Algerian hospitals. Fighting continued on 13 and 14 February, and the Malian army claimed it had managed to enter Tessalit, and refuel the Amachach camp, which the rebels denied.
