= 2017 Indelimane ambush =

2017 battle of the Mali War

- Part of the Mali War
Date	November 24, 2017
Location	Indelimane, Ménaka Cercle, Mali 15°52′N 1°31′E
Result	Indecisive

Belligerents
MINUSMA: Nigerien contingent; Mali	Jama'at Nasr al-Islam wal Muslimin; Islamic State in the Greater Sahara

Casualties and losses
3 killed, 17 injured 1 killed, 1 injured	2 killed

On November 24, 2017, jihadists from Jama'at Nasr al-Islam wal Muslimin ambushed Nigerien MINUSMA peacekeepers and Malian soldiers in the village of Indelimane, Mali.

== Prelude ==
Jama'at Nasr al-Islam wal Muslimin was formed in 2017 as a coalition of five different jihadist groups that had been rebelling against the Malian government since 2012. Prior to the attack in Indelimane, the group attacked a MINUSMA base in Timbuktu. On the same day of the Indelimane ambush, JNIM attacked a MINUSMA base in Douentza, killing one MINUSMA peacekeeper and injuring three others.

== Ambush ==
The ambush occurred at 5am at a MINUSMA camp in the village of Indelimane, Ménaka Cercle. The attack was marked by a rain of rockets that hit the peacekeepers and Malian troops, which was followed up by a frontal attack by the jihadists. MINUSMA reported that several attackers were killed, and the ambush was repulsed. The peacekeepers then sent out in pursuit of the attackers.

== Aftermath ==
Three MINUSMA peacekeepers were killed in the ambush, along with sixteen others injured and one civilian employee injured. The Malian government stated one Malian soldier was killed and one injured. A Nigerien contingent of peacekeepers were on patrol at the time of the attack.

JNIM claimed responsibility for the attack on November 25, and released a statement claiming five Nigerien soldiers were killed along with two JNIM fighters. Interviews with witnesses to the attack reported that fighters from the Islamic State in the Greater Sahara participated in the ambush, in the first confirmed collaboration between the two groups.

In early 2018, GATIA and the MSA, alongside French troops, fought several skirmishes against JNIM and the Islamic State in the vicinity of Indelimane.
