= Assalat Ag Habi =

Malian Tuareg soldier founder of Movement for the Salvation of Azawad

- Born: Malian/Chamamamas Tuareg
- Allegiance: Mali (?-2011); MNLA (2012-2016); MSA (2016-present)
- Rank: Colonel
- Battles / wars: Mali War: First Battle of Ménaka; Battle of Tessalit; First Battle of Kidal; Second Battle of Kidal

Assalat Ag Habi is a Malian Tuareg soldier and a founder of the Movement for the Salvation of Azawad.

== Biography ==
Ag Habi is a Chamamamas Tuareg, and was a colonel in the Malian army. He deserted in July 2011, and later joined the National Movement for the Liberation of Azawad. In January 2012, he led the MNLA at the First Battle of Ménaka, and then took part in the Battle of Tessalit and the First Battle of Kidal. Ag Habi also took part in the Second Battle of Kidal in 2014.

On September 2, 2016, Ag Habi left the MNLA and became a founding member of the Movement for the Salvation of Azawad.
