= Third Battle of Gao =

2013 battle during the Northern Mali Conflict

Coordinates: 16.2667°N 0.0500°W

- Part of Northern Mali conflict
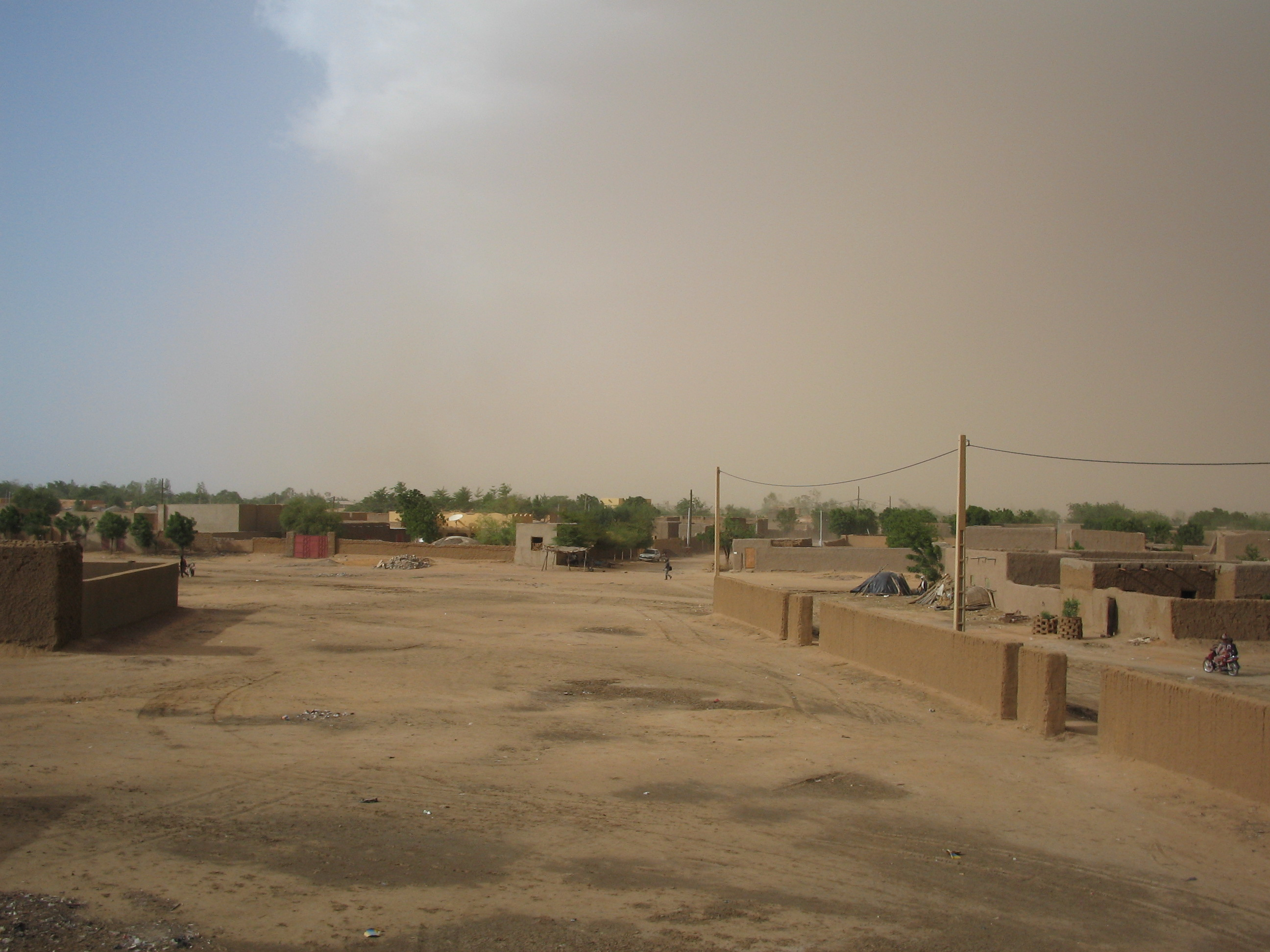
- Gao in 2006
Date	9–11 February 2013 (2 days)
Location	Gao, Mali
Result	Franco-Malian Victory

Belligerents
Mali; France; Niger	MOJWA; Al-Mulathameen

Commanders and leaders
(Mali) Mamadou Samaké (Mali) El Hadj Ag Gamou (France) Bernard Barrera	Hamada Ould Mohamed Kheirou

Strength
1,000 Malian troops 400 French troops 750 Nigerien troops	36+ terrorists

Casualties and losses
4 wounded	18 killed 20 captured

The Third Battle of Gao was fought in the city of Gao on 9–11 February 2013, during the Northern Mali Conflict. It was a raid on the city by rebel MOJWA forces. The raiders were defeated by Malian government forces with the support of troops from France.

== The battle ==
On Saturday, February 9, a would-be suicide bomber was shot dead in the evening before being able to detonate his explosive device. On Sunday, February 10, 2013 Islamic rebels with the Movement for Oneness and Jihad in West Africa launched a raid on the city, possibly from the Adrar des Ifoghas mountains. According to French General Bernard Barrera, the militants used motorcycles and pirogues via the Niger River to infiltrate the city. Fighting began around 2 PM near the central police station in downtown Gao, and later spread across the city, lasting for several hours. French helicopters intervened to help Malian soldiers pinned down by the rebels. Malian gendarme Colonel Saliou Maiga told Reuters the insurgents intended to carry out suicide attacks in the town.

Malian soldiers counter-attacked and began shooting at the Islamists' position. Other Islamists hidden in surrounding buildings opened fire. French soldiers then arrived as reinforcements. The fighting around the police station stopped in the middle of the afternoon, but then continued near the governor's house. According to Malian Lieutenant-Colonel Mamadou Samaké "Islamist infiltrators in the city had been greatly reduced, there are many Islamists killed."

French troops stationed in the Korogoussou Gao International Airport which numbered around 900 men strong, were involved in the late afternoon, including an armored column which was sent to evacuate a dozen journalists trapped on Sharia Square (Independence Square). The fighting was interrupted by dusk, but the next morning at 5:00, a French helicopter bombed and destroyed the Gao police station, thus ending the battle. Also, 6 civilians killed, and 11 to 15 injured during the battle.
