= Abu al-Bara' al-Sahrawi =

Second Wali of the Islamic State – Sahel Province

- أبو البراء الصحراوي

2nd Wali and Emir of Islamic State – Sahel Province
- In office October 28, 2021 – Present
- Preceded by: Adnan Abu Walid al-Sahrawi

Head of the Laws and Punishments Office of the ISSP
- Incumbent
- Assumed office Unknown (Circa. 2021)
- Preceded by: Unknown

Personal details
- Born: Unknown
- Parent: Adnan Abu Walid al-Sahrawi (father)
- Occupation: Militant
- Nickname: Abu al-Bara' al-Ansari al-Sahrawi

Military service
- Allegiance: Islamic State (?–present)
- Branch/service: Islamic State – Sahel Province
- Battles/wars: War in the Sahel; Mali War; JNIM–ISSP conflict; Ménaka offensive; Battle of Andéramboukane; 2026 Mali offensives

Abu al-Bara' al-Ansari al-Sahrawi (Arabic: أبو البراء الصحراوي) is a Sahrawi Islamist militant, the second Wali and Emir of the Islamic State – Sahel Province.

== Biography ==
Abu al-Bara' al-Sahrawi is believed to be Libyan, born in Western Sahara, while others claim he is a foreign fighter based in Libya, according to sources, the leadership of the Islamic State wanted to put an Arab in charge of the province.

Following the death of his father in 2021, Adnan Abu Walid al-Sahrawi, in Mali, he assumed leadership of the province on October 28, 2021.

During Abu al-Bara' al-Sahrawi's leadership, the Islamic State – Sahel Province achieved several victories against JNIM in 2022.

According to Horizon Afrique, Iyad Ag Ghali, emir of the Jama'at Nusrat al-Islam wal-Muslimin, and Abu al-Bara' al-Sahrawi have a rivalry that is presented "less as an ideological clash. A struggle where every territorial advance, seeks to reinforce a dominant position".

The Armed Conflict Location and Event Data Project stated that Abu al-Bara' al-Sahrawi is Emir and head of the Laws and Punishments Office within the Islamic State – Sahel Province.
