= First Battle of Ménaka =

Coordinates: 15.9167°N 2.4000°E

Battle of Ménaka
- Part of Mali War
- First Battle of Ménaka (Mali)
Date	17 January 2012
Location	Ménaka, Mali
Result	Indecisive: Both parties claim victory and control in Ménaka; City of Ménaka and military base completely captured by MNLA at the end of January

Belligerents
Azawad; MNLA; Tuareg volunteers	Mali; Malian Army

Commanders and leaders
(Azawad) Assalat Ag Habi (Azawad) Baye Ag Abilel	(Mali) Unknown

Strength
unknown	200+ troops 1 MiG-21; 1 Mi-24 helicopter

Casualties and losses
4 wounded (according to the MNLA) several deaths some injured 4 captured 6 vehicles destroyed (according to Mali)	1 killed (according to Mali); 2 killed 13 wounded 2 planes destroyed 200 deserted (according to the MNLA)

The First Battle of Menaka is an attack led on January 17, 2012, by armed groups of the National Movement for the Liberation of Azawad (MNLA) and marks the beginning of the Tuareg rebellion of 2012. This is the first in a series of battles aimed a capturing most of the north Mali from the army by the rebels.

== The Battle ==
Before attacking the army barracks, the rebels cut the telephone communications then the attack was launched at 6 am. MNLA forces commanded by Assalat Ag Habi stormed the barracks of the Malian army and attacked the National Guard camp. When they were about to seize the barracks, a Malian helicopter intervened forcing the rebels to retreat. After the rebels retreated, the Malian army supported by a helicopter, that bombe rebel positions. Several vehicles were destroyed and four rebels, some of whom are slightly wounded, were taken prisoner by the army during the battle, according to Malian claims. At the end of the afternoon, the battle stopped and part of the telephone connections was restored.

== Aftermath ==
The Malians claim to have repulsed the attack, and the attackers have several killed and some wounded, according to the spokesman of the Ministry of Defense of Mali, Colonel Idrissa Traore. The Malian army declared one dead in its ranks, but no material loss. In its official statement released on January 22, the MNLA states that its losses are only 4 wounded. They estimated the Malian losses to 2 soldiers killed and 13 others wounded, as well as two planes destroyed. Moreover, the separatists claim that "3 officers and several soldiers in support of the Malian army have deserted to join the MNLA with 30 military vehicles" and that "Following these defections, the Malian army slaughtered three of its soldiers from the Azawad. "In the evening of 17 January, both sides claimed victory and claimed control of Menaka and its two military camps. According to reports, at the end of the battle MNLA was in control of Menaka, while the Army was in control of the military barracks and camps. Later on, 200 soldiers desert with their vehicles and at the end of January, the MNLA captured the whole of Menaka after an MNLA mobile unit under the command of officer Baye Ag Abilel attacked the town.
