= Fahad Ag Almahmoud =

Malian Tuareg militant (died 2024)

Fahad Almahmoud

Secretary-general of GATIA
- In office 15 August 2014 – 13 July 2023
- Preceded by: Position established
- Succeeded by: Youssef Ag Mohamed

Commander of GATIA (Almahmoud)
- In office 18 July 2023 – 1 December 2024

President of the CSP-PSD
- In office March 2022 – August 2022
- Preceded by: Bilal Ag Acherif

Personal details
- Died: 1 December 2024 Tinzaouaten, Kidal, Mali

Fahad Ag Almahmoud (died 1 December 2024) was a Malian Imghad Tuareg militant who served as the secretary-general of GATIA from its formation in 2014 until 2023, when he split from the group and formed his own faction of GATIA.

== Biography ==
Almahmoud first began serving in GATIA at the start of the group's foundation in 2014, where he became the secretary-general of the group. Almahmoud was an Imghad Tuareg, the Tuareg clan that predominantly composes GATIA. He often served as the spokesperson for the group as well, conducting numerous interviews with Malian and international media. In 2019, Almahmoud stated that he believed that the Algiers Agreement did not resolve insecurity in northern Mali, and that there was no governance coming from the Malian government. Almahmoud also stated he didn't believe in Azawadian independence.

Between March and August 2022, Almahmoud served as the president of the CSP-PSD, a coalition composed of pro-government and former rebel minority militant groups. His predecessor was Coordination of Azawad Movements (CMA) founder and leader Bilal Ag Acherif, making Almahmoud's election as president a major reconciliation between GATIA and the CMA.

In July 2023, as tensions escalated between the CSP-PSD and the Malian junta over the latter's growing violations of the Algiers Agreement, Almahmoud was kicked out of the Platform coalition which GATIA is a part of due to his criticism of the Malian government. Almahmoud was also fired from his role as secretary-general of GATIA, and Youssef Ag Mohamed was appointed his successor. Almahmoud stated that he had been fired unjustly for his criticisms, and that GATIA commander El Gamou and Malian Minister of National Reconciliation Ismaël Wagué had planned his firing.

When these tensions escalated into a war between the Malian government and CSP-PSD in September, Almahmoud created his own faction of the group. This faction was recognized as the legitimate faction of GATIA by other members of the CSP-PSD. In December 2023, Almahmoud and other leaders of the CSP were supported by Algeria in holding up the Algiers Accords. In March 2024, Almahmoud was declared a terrorist by the Malian junta along with other members of the CSP-PSD.

On 1 December 2024, Almahmoud was killed in a drone strike by the Malian army alongside seven other Tuareg separatist leaders in Tinzaouaten.
