= Abu Bakr al-Nasr =

Egyptian jihadist and activist (d. 2014)

- Nickname: L'Égyptien
- Born: Egypt
- Died: April 10–11, 2014 near Timetrine, Mali
- Allegiance: Taliban (until 2010) al-Qaeda (2011); AQIM (2011-2012); Signatories by Blood al-Mourabitoun
- Rank: Emir (al-Mourabitoun)
- Known for: Emir of al-Mourabitoun
- Conflicts: War in Afghanistan; First Libyan Civil War; Mali War †

Abu Bakr al-Nasr, nom de guerre L'Égyptien, was an Egyptian jihadist who served as the emir of the Malian jihadist group Al-Mourabitoun from its foundation in 2013 until his death in 2014.

== Biography ==
al-Nasr was born in Egypt at an unknown date. He took part in the war in Afghanistan fighting for the Taliban. In 2011, he fled to Libya when the Libyan civil war broke out and established a training camp for al-Qaeda in Benghazi. al-Nasr met with Mokhtar Belmokhtar in the fall of 2011 in Libya, being recruited to northern Mali with him where Belmokhtar was the head of a katiba of Al-Qaeda in the Islamic Maghreb. In late 2012, al-Nasr had a key role in planning the In Amenas hostage crisis that occurred in January 2013 in Algeria.

On August 22, 2013, Ahmed al-Tilemsi and Belmokhtar announced the merger between Movement for Oneness and Jihad in West Africa (MOJWA) and the Blood Signatories group. They ceded leadership of the new group, dubbed Al-Mourabitoun, to another unnamed person.

al-Nasr was killed by the French Army between April 10 and 11, 2014, south of Timetrine. According to Malian authorities, al-Nasr was killed that night in a shootout with the French army, which left seven jihadists dead. The French Army confirmed in May that al-Nasr was the leader of al-Mourabitoun, who was previously unknown. Authorities suspected that al-Nasr was chosen to lead the movement due to his background in international jihadist movements, and his claims to personally know al-Qaeda emir Ayman al-Zawahiri. Subsequently, al-Nasr could've served as a middleman between Belmokhtar and al-Zawahiri.
