= Inkadogotane ambush =

- Part of the Mali War
Date	9 July 2017
Location	Inkadogotane, Ménaka Region, Mali
Result	ISIL victory

Belligerents
Mali	ISIL: Islamic State in the Greater Sahara

Commanders and leaders
(Mali) Unknown	Amat Ag Assalate; Almahmoud Ag Akawkaw

Units involved
Malian Army	Unknown

Strength
Unknown; 8 vehicles	50 militants

Casualties and losses
8 killed 27 missing 4 vehicles destroyed 1 vehicle captured	Unknown

The Inkadogotane ambush was carried out by ISIL against Malian soldiers on 9 July 2017.

== Ambush ==
On 9 July 2017, about 50 ISIL militants suspected to be under the commands of Amat Ag Assalate and Almahmoud Ag Akawkaw ambushed a convoy of eight vehicles carrying soldiers from the Malian Army, near the border with Niger, about 60 km (37 mi) from Ménaka. During the fighting, some Malian soldiers fled into the desert, while dozens of others were reportedly killed. After the battle, 29 Malian soldiers went missing, two of whom were later found wandering in the desert. The bodies of eight Malian soldiers were found on 17 July 2017.
