= Killing of Adnan Abu Walid al-Sahrawi =

2021 battle in the Mali War

- Part of Operation Barkhane in the Mali War
Date	17–21 August 2021
Location	Dangalous forest, near Indelimane, Mali
Result	French victory

Belligerents
France	Islamic State in the Greater Sahara

Commanders and leaders
Unknown	Adnan Abu Walid al-Sahrawi †

Strength
20 men	Unknown

Casualties and losses
None	10 killed

Between August 17 to 21, 2021, French forces under Operation Barkhane launched an operation to attack Islamic State in the Greater Sahara bases located in the Dangalous forest near Indelimane village of Mali. The battle killed the commander of ISGS, Adnan Abu Walid al-Sahrawi.

== Prelude ==
Two Islamic State fighters captured on July 14 reported the presence of ISGS camps in the Dangarous Forest, a notoriously wooded area that is difficult to access. On August 17, French intelligence conducted initial operations in the forest, with a Reaper drone killing two armed men on a motorcycle. One of the two killed turned out to be Adnan Abu Walid al-Sahrawi, the leader of Islamic State in the Greater Sahara, although this was not immediately identifiable.

The second part of the operation was carried out between August 20 and August 22. About twenty men, supported by drones and helicopters, intercepted two more men on motorcycles. After a short firefight, the two men were killed. French forces then proceeded to launch airstrikes on ISGS positions inside the forest, which continued after the French soldiers retreated.

== Losses and aftermath ==
According to the French government, ten jihadists were killed in the operation.

On September 16, 2021, French president Emmanuel Macron released a statement saying that the leader of ISGS had been "neutralized" in a strike by French forces in August. French Minister of Defence Florence Parly stated that the killing of al-Sahrawi "deals a decisive blow to the command of Daesh in the Sahel because ISGS will no doubt have difficulty replacing its emir with a figure of the same stature."
