= Didier Dacko =

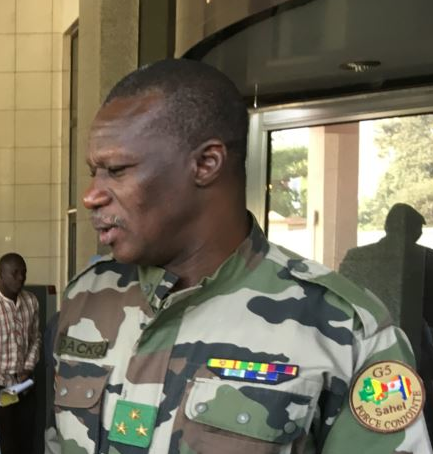
- Dacko in 2018, as commander of the G5 Sahel
- Born: 1967 (age 58–59); San, Mali
- Branch: Malian Armed Forces
- Rank: Division general
- Commands: Chief of the General Staff of Mali (2016); Commander of G5 Sahel Joint Forces (2017-2018)
- Known for: Defense at the Battle of Konna
- Conflicts: Mali War: Battle of Tessalit; Battle of Konna; Second Battle of Konna
- Other work: Ambassador of Mali to China (2019-present)

Didier Dacko is a Malian general who commanded Malian forces during the early stages of the Mali War, and reversed the gains made by the National Movement for the Liberation of Azawad (MNLA) and jihadist groups in 2013.

== Biography ==
Dacko was born in San, Mali, in 1967 to a Bobo family. He graduated at the top of his class from the Kati Military Prytaneum. When the Mali War broke out in 2012, Dacko was a colonel-major and the commander in Gao Region. In February and March, he led reinforcements to try and break the siege of Tessalit, but was not able to. On March 31, 2012, he was forced to abandon Gao and return to Sévaré. Dacko commanded Malian forces during the Battle of Konna in January 2013, effectively halting the spread southward of jihadist groups. He then commanded Malian forces in recapturing Gao in January 2013. He then captured Anéfis from the MNLA in June 2013.

Dacko was promoted to brigadier-general for these actions in August 2013, and subsequently promoted to Deputy Chief of the General Staff that October. On May 21, 2014, Dacko led over 2,000 men to recapture Kidal from the MNLA and the HCUA. The counteroffensive failed, however, and Malian forces were forced to seek refuge in a MINUSMA base.

Dacko was promoted to Chief of Staff on June 29, 2016, replacing Mahamane Touré, and was promoted to division general in the process. Dacko was promoted again on June 8, 2017, becoming commander of the G5 Sahel Joint Force. He was dismissed on July 2, 2018, due to a lack of results and command errors, and replaced by Hanena Ould Sidi.

He was then made the Malian ambassador to the People's Republic of China on February 21, 2019. He was accredited Ambassador to Japan on August 26, 2024
