= N'Tillit =

- Commune and town
- Location in Mali
- Coordinates: 15°32′46″N 0°27′38″W
- Country: Mali
- Region: Gao Region
- Cercle: Gao Cercle

Government
  - Control: Azawad Liberation Front; Jama'at Nusrat al-Islam wal-Muslimin

Population (2009 Census)
  - Total: 22,100
- Time zone: UTC+0 (GMT)

N'Tillit is a rural commune and village in the Cercle of Gao in the Gao Region of south-eastern Mali. In the 2009 census the commune had a population of 22,100.
