= BRDM =

Soviet reconnaissance vehicle family

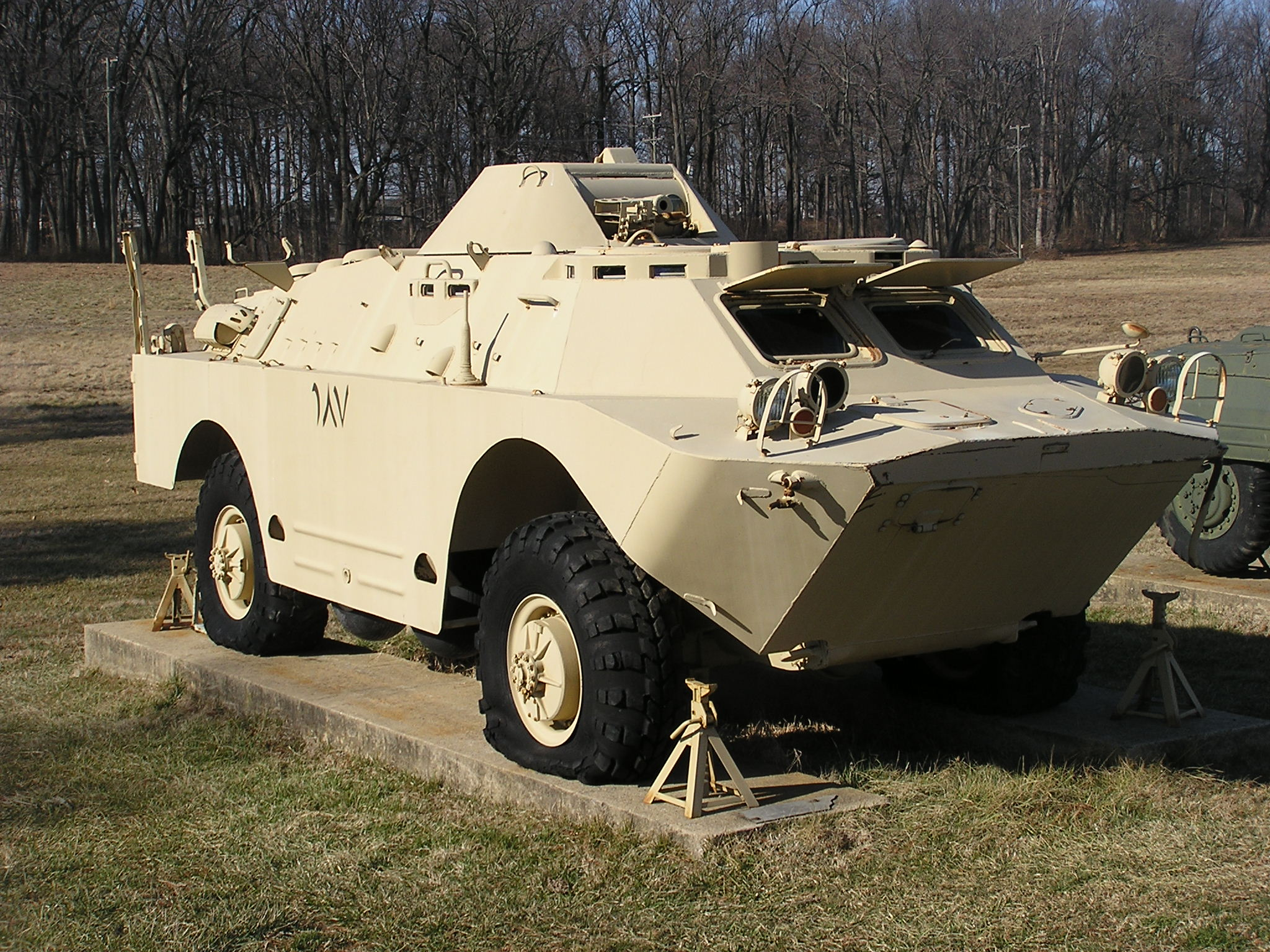
Captured Iraqi BRDM at the former site of the U.S. Army Ordnance Museum in Aberdeen, Maryland

BRDM is an initialism for Boyevaya Razvedyvatelnaya Dozornaya Mashina, (Russian: Боевая Разведывательная Дозорная Машина), literally "Combat Reconnaissance Patrol Vehicle". The BRDM is an eight-wheeled amphibious vehicle with armor that provides protection against small arms fire and shell fragments. The welded steel hull is 5–14 mm thick, sufficient to protect against 7.62×39mm ammunition at normal combat ranges from the front. The vehicle is not protected against heavy machine gun fire (e.g., 12.7×108mm) or anti-armor weapons. Both versions were produced in the Soviet Union and other Eastern Bloc countries. Both versions came in an ATGM variant. The BRDM-2 also came as a command vehicle and as an air defence vehicle.

== BRDM-1 ==
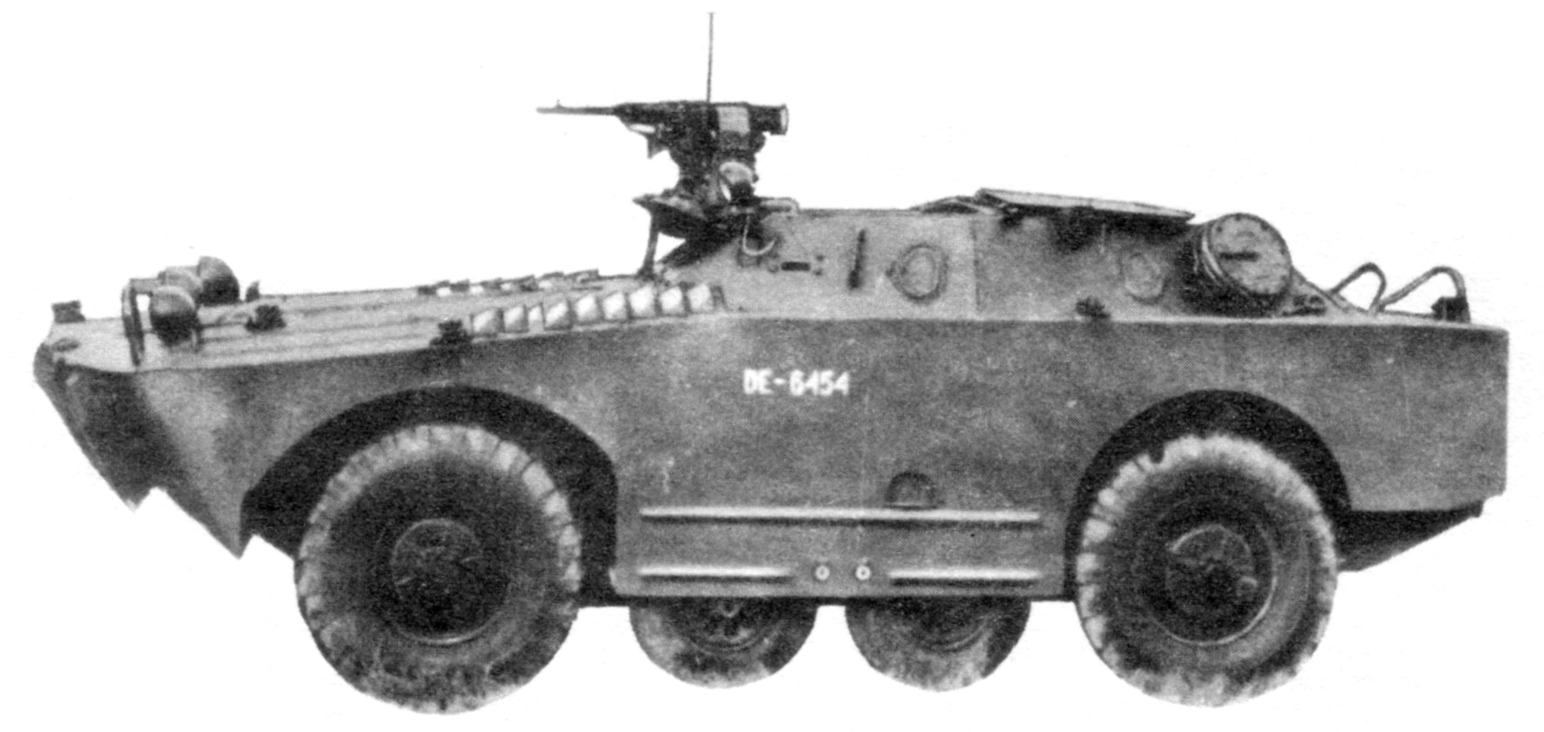
BRDM-1 with 7.62mm SGMB machine gun

The BRDM-1 (also known as the BTR-40P) first appeared in 1959, and was in production until 1966. Total production was around 10,000 vehicles; less than 600 remain in the reserves of a number of countries. It was armed with a pintle-mounted heavy machine gun. The initial version of the vehicle, the Model 1957, had an open roof, but the standard production model, the Model 1958, had a roof with twin hatches.

The vehicle was used as the basis of the 2P27 anti-tank missile launcher, using AT-1 Snapper missiles mounted in a retractable launcher.

== BRDM-2 ==
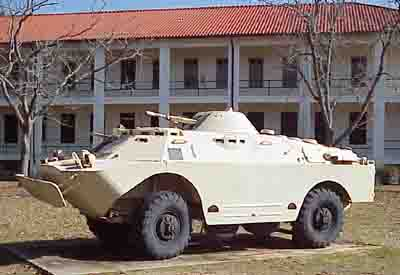
Iraqi BRDM-2 at the U.S. National Infantry Museum, Fort Benning

The BRDM-2 was intended to replace the earlier BRDM-1 with a vehicle that had improved amphibious capabilities and better armament. The BRDM-2 is driven by a rear-mounted gasoline engine that also supplies power to a waterjet for amphibious travel. It has a crew of four, a driver, co-driver, commander, and gunner. The armament is the same as the BTR-60 armoured personnel carrier, a 14.5 mm KPV heavy machine gun with a 7.62 mm machine gun as a secondary weapon. The armor on the vehicle protects fully against small arms fire and artillery shell splinters. This vehicle has been exported extensively and is in use in at least 45 countries.

The BRDM-2 is sometimes confused with the Hungarian D-442 FUG amphibious scout car and the D-944 PSZH APC, which have rear engines but also have twin waterjets.

The 9K31 Strela-1 (NATO name "Gaskin") mobile surface-to-air missile system is based on a modified BRDM-2 (4 x 4) amphibious chassis with its belly wheels removed. The original turret has been replaced by a one-man turret with an elevating arm on each side. Mounted to each arm is a box-type launcher for the SA-9 fire-and-forget missiles. To reduce the overall height of the system for travelling, the missiles are normally lowered into the horizontal position on each side of the vehicle.

== BRDM-3 ==
Although some Western sources use the designator BRDM-3 for the 9P148—an anti-tank variant of the BRDM-2 with ATGM launcher—the BRDM-3 is in fact based on the BTR-80AK and with a new day/night vision device in front of the commander's position. The crew consists of 6 men.
