= Movement for the Salvation of Azawad =

Tuareg political movement

- Mouvement pour le salut de l'Azawad
- Leaders: Moussa Ag Acharatoumane (founder); Assalat Ag Habi (military commander)
- Dates active: 2 September 2016 – present
- Split from: National Movement for the Liberation of Azawad (MNLA)
- Active regions: Gao Region, Kidal Region
- Ideology: Tuareg nationalism Secularism
- Political position: Azawad self-determination
- Size: 3,000
- Wars: the Northern Mali conflict

The Movement for the Salvation of Azawad (French: Mouvement pour le salut de l'Azawad; abbreviated MSA) is a Tuareg political movement and armed group in Azawad, Mali. It was founded on 2 September 2016 by Moussa Ag Acharatoumane.

== History ==
The MSA was founded on 2 September 2016 in Tin-Fadimata, north of Ménaka, by former members of the National Movement for the Liberation of Azawad (MNLA).

With French support, a joint-operation was conducted by the MSA and the Imghad Tuareg Self-Defense Group and Allies (or GATIA) on 23 February 2018 to capture or kill Malian ISIL commander Abu Walid al-Sahrawi. Six ISIL militants were killed in the ensuing clashes, but Al-Sahrawi survived and evaded capture.

MSA and GATIA troops battled ISIL militants from 2 to 5 June 2018. ISIL commander Almahmoud Ag Akawkaw was captured, while Amat Ag Assalate was killed during the battle.

In July 2019 MSA joined Platform and as that also later the CSP-DPA on 6 May 2021, though it later withdrew from it on the 24 September 2023 over its conflict with the Malian Government.
