= Hamada Ould Mohamed Kheirou =

Mauritanian jihadist and founder of MUJAO

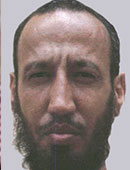
- Birth name: Abderrahmane Ould Mohamed Lemine Ould Mohamed Khairy
- Nickname(s): Abu Qumqum
- Born: 1970; Ould Naga, Mauritania
- Died: July 21, 2017; Libya
- Cause of death: Airstrike
- Allegiance: AQIM (2009–2011); MOJWA (2011–2014); Shura Council of Mujahideen in Derna (2014); IS-L
- Known for: Founder of MOJWA
- Battles / wars: Mali War; Second Libyan Civil War

Hamada Ould Mohamed Kheirou (Note: Also spelled Hamad El Kheiry, Abderrahmane Ould Mohamed Lemine Ould Mohamed Kheiry, Amada Ould Kheirou, and Hamada Ould Mohamed El Khairy) nom de guerre Abu Qum-Qum (Note: French: Abou Ghoum-Ghoum) was a Mauritanian jihadist and the founder of the Movement for Oneness and Jihad in West Africa (MUJAO/MOJWA).

== Biography ==
Kheirou was born in Ouad Naga and a descent of the marabout tribe of Tegounanett. In 2005, he was arrested in Nouakchott for instigating violence in a mosque, which he claimed was teaching untrue Islam. He escaped the city a few months later disguised as a woman.

Kheirou was arrested again on September 3, 2008, in Kita, Mali, but was released in April 2009 along with Idris Ould Mohamed Lemine in a prison exchange with Al-Qaeda in the Islamic Maghreb (AQIM). He was released on the behest of Canada for the Canadian diplomats Robert Fowler and Louis Gay, according to Franco-Beninese journalist Serge Daniel. According to Jeune Afrique, Kheirou was released in 2010 for French hostage Pierre Camatte.

Kheirou joined AQIM in 2009, supplying Mokhtar Belmokhtar's katiba in northern Mali along with making explosives. During his time in AQIM, Kheirou criticized the leadership of Abdelmalek Droukdel and accused the group of being dominated by Algerians and an inequitable distribution of money gathered from hostage-taking and trafficking. In late 2011, he founded the Movement for Oneness and Jihad in West Africa and established connection with Boko Haram.

In MOJWA, Kheirou sponsored the Tamanrasset suicide bombing on March 3, 2012, killing twenty-three people. When the Mali War broke out in 2012, MOJWA fought against moderate Tuareg rebels and the Malian government.

Kheirou has been sanctioned by the United Nations and the United States, with the latter setting a $5 million bounty for his arrest.

In 2014, he announced his allegiance to the Islamic State, and his refusal of the merger between MOJWA and Al-Mourabitoun. Kheirou is believed to have fled to and lived in Sirte, Libya, when the city was controlled of the Islamic State. In Libya, he fought with the Shura Council of Mujahideen in Derna before fleeing to Sirte. Mauritanian media reported he was killed in a 2017 airstrike in Libya.
