= Strategic Framework for the Defense of the People of Azawad =

Defense coalition in Mali

- Cadre stratégique pour la défense du peuple de l'Azawad
- Leaders: President: Bilal Ag Acherif; Vice-President: Fahad Ag Almahmoud; Spokesperson: Mohamed Elmaouloud Ramadane
- Dates active: 6 May 2021 – November 30, 2024
- Groups: Coordination of Azawad Movements; GATIA (al-Mahmoud faction); Platform (until September 2023)
- Wars: Mali War

The Strategic Framework for the Defense of the People of Azawad (French: Cadre stratégique pour la défense du peuple de l'Azawad; CSP-DPA) was a coalition of political and military movements in northern Mali that was formed on 6 May 2021, as an alliance of the Coordination of Azawad Movements (CMA) and Platform. In September 2023, Platform left the CSP-PSD due to the CMA's war with the Malian government. In April 2024, the CSP-DPA was renamed from the Permanent Strategic Framework for Peace, Security, and Development (French: Cadre stratégique permanent pour la paix, la sécurité et le développement; CSP-PSD).

== History ==
Throughout the 2010s, there were brief clashes between the CMA and Platform, so the two groups began talks in late 2020 on reconciling their differences over the Algiers Agreement of 2015. The CSP-PSD was created officially on 6 May 2021, after two days of discussion in Rome. Their first provisional president was Bilal Ag Acherif, leader of the National Movement for the Liberation of Azawad (MNLA), vice-president Fahad Ag Al-Mahmoud, and their spokesperson was Moussa Ag Acharatoumane.

On 12 December 2022, the CSP-PSD pulled out of peace talks with the Malian government, accusing the government of being unwilling to negotiate. The group stated that in order for them to return, new peace talks needed to be held in a neutral country.

On 22 June 2023, the CSP-PSD lambasted the Malian government's threats pressuring the United Nations Multidimensional Integrated Stabilization Mission in Mali (MINUSMA) to leave, claiming that the absence of MINUSMA without a "credible alternative would constitute a threat to security in Mali and the whole region."

On 26 September 2023, Platform left the CSP-PSD due to the CMA's attack on Malian government bases following Mali's collaboration with Wagner Group mercenaries and their war crimes against civilians.

On 30 September 2023, the CMA claimed responsibility for an attack in Dioura, saying that they captured the military base there after two hours of fighting. Mali admitted that its base there had been attacked. on 1 October 2023, the CMA claimed that they had seized the military base at Bamba. On 20 December 2023, the CSP-PSD announced a blockade of all roads leading to the borders with Mauritania, Algeria, and Niger.

In April 2024, the CSP-PSD became the Strategic Framework for the Defense of the People of Azawad (CSP-DPA). Between 25 and 27 July 2024, the CSP-DPA and JNIM engaged in a battle against Malian forces and Wagner Group mercenaries, reportedly killing, wounding, and capturing dozens, including at least three Wagner Group commanders.
