= Battle of Kidal (2014) =

Coordinates: 18.4411°N 1.4072°E

Second Battle of Kidal
- Part of the Internal conflict in Azawad
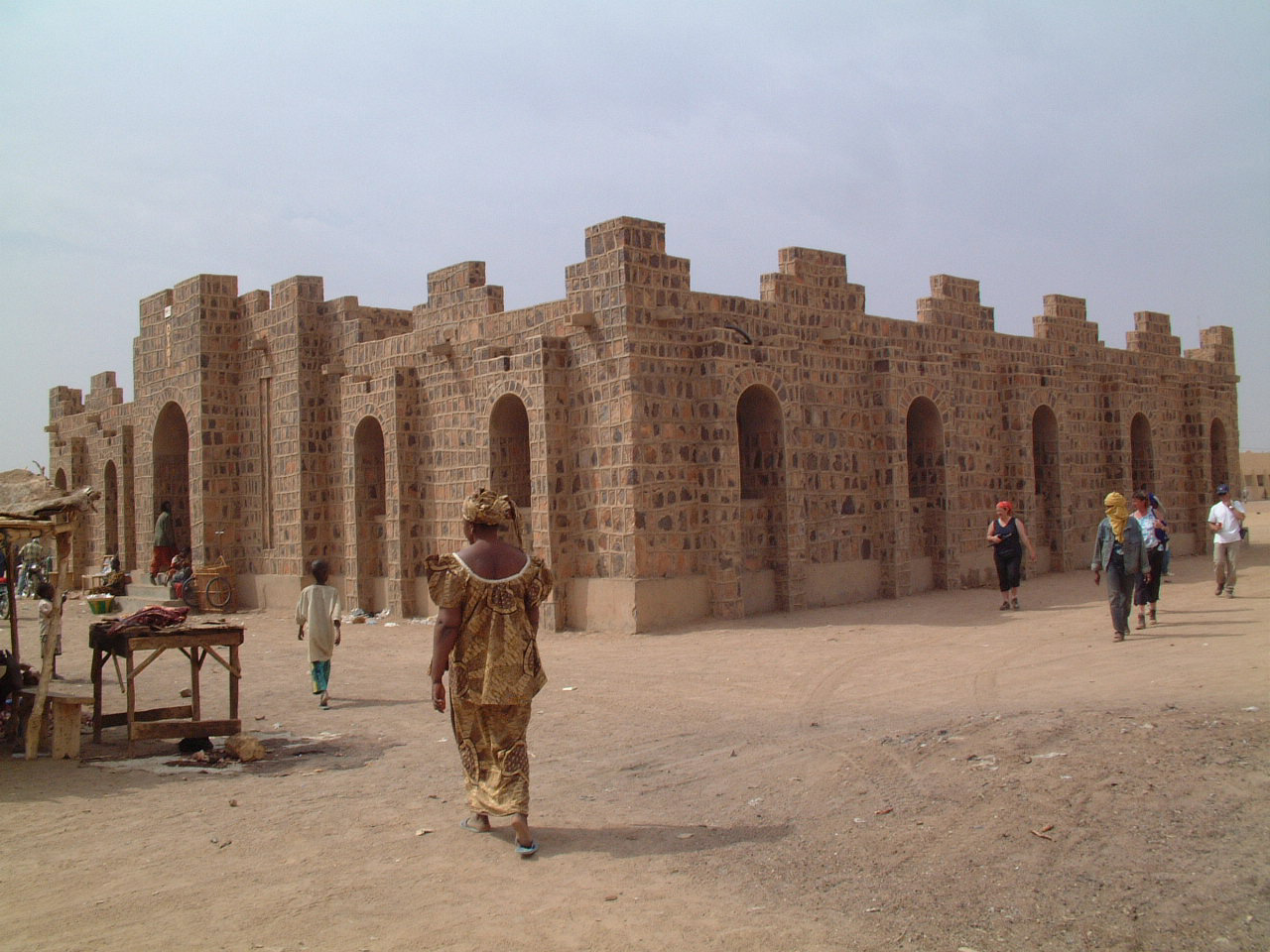
- House of craftsmen in Kidal
| Date | 16–21 May 2014 (5 days) |
| Location | Kidal, Mali |
| Result | MNLA Victory: Kidal captured by MNLA; Malian Army forced to withdraw from Kidal. |

Belligerents
| Mali: Malian Army | Azawad: MNLA |

Strength
| 1,500 | Unknown |

Casualties and losses
| 50 killed 40 wounded 70 captured 50 vehicles captured 12 armoured vehicles captured | 2 killed 10 wounded (According to the MNLA) |

The Second Battle of Kidal took place during the Mali War, when MNLA forces in control of Kidal attacked Prime Minister Moussa Mara's convoy during a visit to the town. Consequently, Malian government forces launched an offensive to retake the city, successfully recapturing it.

Since the foreign intervention in Mali, Kidal was retaken by French, Malian, and Chadian troops. On 17 May 2014, Moussa Mara, the Malian prime minister came to visit Kidal.

== The battle ==
=== Prime Minister's visit and hostage-taking ===
On 17 May, in Kidal, the Prime Minister convoy's was attacked in the streets of the city. As a result, the Prime Minister condemned the violence as "...a declaration of war" and promised an "...appropriate response."

On 18 May, following the capture of areas of the governorate by the MNLA, 1500 Malian soldiers arrived in the city. During the capture of this government building, the MNLA captured around 30 officials but they were released soon after.

=== Malian army offensive ===
On 21 May, the Malian army launched an offensive to retake the city. The fighting lasted five hours after the military camp number 1 was captured by the MNLA. After the fighting, the Malian soldiers fled towards Gao, others fled to the military camp number 2, held by the French troops and Minusma. Malian defense minister admitted, that 50 Malian soldiers were killed and 48 wounded in the fighting.

According to MNLA, they seized "...50 brand new 4 x 4 vehicles," 12 armored vehicles and tons of ammunition and weapons.

On October 2, 2023, a column of 800 Malian and Russian forces launched a drone-supported offensive towards Kidal, they captured Anefis on October 7, and the MINUSMA evacuated soon after on October 31, Kidal fell on November 14, 2023.
