= Moussa Ag Acharatoumane =

Azawadi spokesperson and politician

Spokesperson of the NMLA
- Incumbent
- Assumed office 2012

Moussa Ag Acharatoumane is a Malian separatist, who serves as a Spokesperson for the National Movement for the Liberation of Azawad (MNLA) and was based in Paris, France, as recently as 22 March 2012. He is one of the founders of the National Movement of Azawad and the Movement for the Salvation of Azawad (MSA) in 2016, and a member of the defense commission of the National Transitional Council (CNT) in 2020.

== Biography ==
Moussa Ag Acharatoumane was born in Kidal, to a father from the Daoussahak-Icherifen Tuareg tribe and a mother from the Kel Ansar tribe. After growing up in Kidal, he studied sociology in Bamako and political science in Paris. He then formed associations with other young Tuaregs and campaigned for the defense of Azawad. From 2007 onwards he traveled abroad to Brussels, Paris, New York, and Geneva.

In 2016, Moussa left the MNLA and founded the Movement for the Salvation of Azawad in the tuareg city of Ménaka.
