= Adnan Abu Walid al-Sahrawi =

First Emir of the Islamic State – Sahel Province (1973–2021)

- عدنان أبو وليد الصحراوي
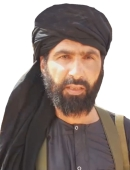
- Image of al-Sahrawi taken from U.S. State Department

1st Emir of Islamic State – Sahel Province
- In office 13 May 2015 – 17 August 2021
- Preceded by: Office established
- Succeeded by: Abu al-Bara' al-Sahrawi

Personal details
- Born: Lehbib Ould Ali Ould Said Ould Yumani; 16 February 1973 Laayoune, Spanish Sahara
- Died: 17 August 2021 (aged 48) Dangalous Forest, Mali
- Occupation: Militant
- Nickname: Adnan Abu Walid al-Sahrawi

Military service
- Allegiance: Polisario Front (early 1990s-2000s); MUJAO (2011–2013); Al-Mourabitoun (2013–2015); Islamic State (2015–2021)
- Battles/wars: Operation Barkhane; Tongo Tongo ambush Killing of Adnan Abu Walid al-Sahrawi †

Lehbib Ould Ali Ould Said Ould Yumani (Arabic: الحبيب ولد علي ولد سعيد ولد اليماني; 16 February 1973 – 17 August 2021), also known by the nom de guerre Adnan Abu Walid al-Sahrawi (Arabic: عدنان أبو وليد الصحراوي), was a Sahrawi Islamist militant and the first Emir of the Islamic State – Sahel Province.

== Biography ==
Al-Sahrawi was born in Laayoune into a wealthy trading family that fled the city for refugee camps in Algeria. He joined the Polisario Front and received military training, but he demobilised amid promises of a United Nations referendum on the status of Western Sahara.

He studied social sciences at the Mentouri University of Constantine, from which he graduated in 1997. A year later he joined the Sahrawi Youth Union. In 2004, said to be suffering from health problems and depression, he turned to Islam after contact with students from the Ibn Abbas Institute in Nouakchott.

Around November 2010, he left Tindouf in Algeria for northern Mali and joined the Katiba Tarik ibn Zayd, a unit of al-Qaeda in the Islamic Maghreb.

In October 2011, he was part of the group that founded the Movement for Oneness and Jihad in West Africa, alongside the Malian Ahmed al-Tilemsi and Sultan Ould Bady, as well as the Mauritanian Hamada Ould Mohamed Kheirou. While part of MUJWA/MUJAO, he was one of its most senior leaders, serving on its Shura council and communicating with international media as MUJWA's spokesman.

By 2013, he was calling himself the leader of an organisation named the Mujahideen Shura Council in Gao, Mali. After MUJAO merged with Mokhtar Belmokhtar's Al-Mulathameen group in August 2013 to form Al-Mourabitoun, he was an important leader in Al-Murabitoun, later becoming its overall head.

In March 2012, he was leading a group in control of the town of Askia.

On 13 May 2015, Abu Walid declared his allegiance to Abu Bakr al-Baghdadi, leader of the Islamic State of Iraq and the Levant, and formed the Islamic State in the Greater Sahara. Not all of Al-Mourabitoun accepted the move, with Mokhtar Belmokhtar denying that al-Murabitoun had pledged to Baghdadi, causing a split in the group. More than a year and a half later, the allegiance was publicly accepted by ISIS's Amaq News Agency.

In May 2016, he was reported to have issued threats against the government of Morocco.

In June 2017, al-Sahrawi accused the Imghad and Idaksahak communities of defending Niger and France and threatened retaliation against them. In October 2017, he led the Tongo Tongo ambush against Nigerien and United States soldiers outside the village of Tongo Tongo, Niger.

On 4 October 2019, the United States offered a $5 million reward under the Rewards for Justice program for information on his whereabouts.

=== Death ===
Al-Sahrawi was killed by French forces in the Sahel on 17 August 2021. After captured IS-GS members provided information on al-Sahrawi's likely hiding places, the assassination was conducted using a drone in the Dangalous Forest, located near Indelimane village in northern Mali and near the border with Niger, according to the Chief of the Defence Staff Thierry Burkhard. Burkhard added that al-Sahrawi was travelling on a motorcycle with another person when he was killed. A unit comprising 20 soldiers of the French Army's special forces was then sent to confirm the identities of those killed and found that the strike had killed ten IS-GS members. The announcement was delayed while Al-Sahrawi's identity was confirmed. French President Emmanuel Macron announced his death on 15 September. ISIS confirmed al-Sahrawi's death in October 2021.

== Personal life ==
Al-Sahrawi was said to have married a Fulani woman, in order to better integrate with cross-border communities.
