= Anéfis =

- Commune and village
- Location in Mali
- Coordinates: 18°2′40″N 0°36′10″E
- Country: Mali
- Region: Kidal Region
- Cercle: Kidal Cercle

Government
  - Control: Azawad Liberation Front; Mali; Africa Corps

Area
  - Total: 2,800 km^{2} (1,100 sq mi)

Population (2009)
  - Total: 5,087
  - Density: 1.8/km^{2} (4.7/sq mi)
- Time zone: UTC+0 (GMT)

Anéfis or Anefif is a Saharan village and commune in the Cercle of Kidal in the Kidal Region of north-eastern Mali.

== Geography ==
Anefif is located on the Tessalit Trail. It lies 95 km (59 mi) southwest of Kidal on the route linking Kidal to Bourem and Gao. In 2009 the commune had a population of 5,087.

There are multiple rocks and stones made from volcanic material.

== History ==
In 2013, the Malian Military attacked Tuareg rebels living in the village. The war was highly criticized by the military, and the press, who claimed that it was too invasive and violent.

== Climate ==
The commune has a Saharian climate and is too dry for rain-fed agriculture. The annual rainfall of around 150 mm occurs between late June and early September.

== Kel Adagh ==
There are many Kel Adagh in the area, along with multiple small clans.

== Notable people ==
- Abdullah Senussi - Head of Libyan Military Intelligence (born 1949).
