= Imghad Tuareg Self-Defense Group and Allies =

Pro-government armed group in Mali

- Groupe d'autodéfense touareg Imghad et alliés
- Leaders: El Hadj Ag Gamou (military commander); Fahad Ag Almahmoud (secretary general)
- Dates active: 14 August 2014 – 30 November 2024
- Headquarters: Somewhere between the Gao and Kidal regions
- Active regions: Gao Region, Kidal Region
- Ideology: Imghad Tuareg interests
- Political position: Pro-Malian government; Malian sovereignty over Azawad
- Size: 500–1,000
- Part of: Platform of Self-Defense Movements

The Imghad Tuareg Self-Defense Group and Allies (French: Groupe d'autodéfense touareg Imghad et alliés, abbreviated GATIA) was an armed group in Azawad, Mali. Most of its 500 to 1,000 fighters were Imghad Tuaregs, supporting the Malian government as a part of the Platform Alliance.

== History ==
GATIA was founded on 14 August 2014 as a self-defense group of armed locals, in response to the Malian Army's total defeat in the 2nd Battle of Kidal on 21 May 2014 by the National Movement for the Liberation of Azawad (MNLA).

In collaboration with French forces, GATIA and the Movement for the Salvation of Azawad (MSA) launched a joint-operation on 23 February 2018 to capture or kill Abu Walid al-Sahrawi, the ISIL commander in Mali. Al-Sahrawi survived and managed to evade capture, but six ISIL militants were killed in the clashes.

GATIA-MSA forces clashed with ISIL militants from 2 to 5 June 2018. ISIL commander Almahmoud Ag Akawkaw was captured, while Amat Ag Assalate was killed during the battle.

On December 1, 2024, a former commander of GATIA, Fahad Ag Almahmoud, was assassinated in a drone strike by the Malian army.

In 2024, a "fringe group" of the GATIA were one of the factions that merged with other Tuareg rebel groups to form the Azawad Liberation Front.

== Ideology ==
GATIA is a pro-Malian government group and is generally opposed to the MNLA and an independent Azawad.
