= Battle of Abala =

2017 battle

- Part of Jihadist insurgency in Niger
Date	May 31 – June 1, 2017
Location	Abala and Bani-Bangou, Niger and Menaka Region, Mali
Result	Allied victory

Belligerents
Niger; Mali; GATIA; MSA; France	Islamic State in the Greater Sahara

Commanders and leaders
Unknown	Mohamed Ag Almouner

Casualties and losses
6 killed, 1 missing	15 killed

Between May 31 and June 1, 2017, clashes broke out between Nigerien forces and the Islamic State in the Greater Sahara (ISGS) near Abala, Niger. These clashes expanded to the Nigerien-Malian border near Bani-Bangou, and on June 1 the ISGS militants were confronted by French, Malian, and Tuareg militias when the militants fled towards Ménaka Region, Mali.

== Background ==
Since its emergence in October 2016 and its first attacks on the Koutoukole prison and possibly Nigerien forces in Tazalit, the Islamic State in the Greater Sahara began conducting attacks along the Nigerian-Malian-Burkinabe tri-border area. In late 2016 and early 2017, the group began more and more attacks on Nigerien forces, including at Bani-Bangou, Tilwa, and Wanzarbé.

== Battle ==
The attack on Abala took place at 7pm on the afternoon of May 31. The jihadists attacked a patrol of Nigerien forces with 11 to 14 pick-ups, including at least two equipped with 14.5mm machine guns. The jihadists were led by a commander named Mohamed Ag Almouner, known as Tinka. The vehicles had been stolen from an earlier raid on Nigerien forces on Ayorou on May 11, leading the Nigerien forces present in Abala to believe that the jihadists were instead their comrades. Fighting between the two groups ended at nightfall. The jihadists then retreated from the area with four newly captured vehicles.

Nigerien forces continued combing and cleanup operations in the area following the attack, and fighting with the ISGS resumed the next day near Bani-Bangou on the Nigerien-Malian border. The Nigerien Army deployed helicopters and recaptured two of the four vehicles. French planes also were deployed to the area to combat the jihadists. The ISGS militants fled to Ménaka Region of Mali, where they were confronted by Malian and French forces alongside the Tuareg militias of GATIA and the Movement for the Salvation of Azawad.

== Aftermath ==
AFP reported that four Nigerien National Guardsmen and two gendarmes were killed, and one soldier was missing. The French Army stated on June 8 that the majority of the attackers were killed or wounded, and that some of the equipment stolen during the initial attack was recaptured. RFI stated that fifteen jihadists were killed.

The Islamic State in the Greater Sahara was accused of the attack. In late June, ISGS leader Adnan Abu Walid al-Sahrawi accused Imghad and Daoussahak Tuaregs of being accomplices of France and Niger, and threatened Moussa Ag Acharatoumane and El Hadj Ag Gamou, the heads of the MSA and GATIA respectively. ISGS claimed responsibility for the attack on January 12, 2018, in a statement published in the Nouakchott Information Agency.
