= Gaigorou massacre =

2021 terrorist incident in Niger

- Part of Jihadist insurgency in Niger
- Location: Gaigorou, Tillaberi Region, Niger
- Date: April 17, 2021
- Target: Zarma civilians and funeral attendees
- Deaths: 19
- Injuries: 2
- Perpetrator: Islamic State in the Greater Sahara

On April 17, 2021, Fulani militants from the Islamic State in the Greater Sahara (ISGS) attacked the Zarma village of Gaigorou in Tillabéri Region, Niger, killing nineteen civilians. The massacre was part of a series of massacres on Zarma areas by ISGS since the beginning of 2021.

== Background ==
At the start of 2021, the Islamic State in the Greater Sahara, a predominantly Fulani organization based in the tri-border area between Mali, Niger, and Burkina Faso, began attacking civilian areas, especially with non-Fulani populations. The first major attack was the Tchoma Bangou and Zaroumdareye massacres that killed 105 people, and in March 2021 ISGS attacked the villages of Darey-Daye and a cluster of villages in Tillia, killing 66 and 141 people respectively. Gaigorou in particular has come under attack and threat by ISGS multiple times since January 2021, with the fighters seeking zakat from the villagers.

== Massacre ==
At the time of the attack, villagers in Gaigorou were attending a funeral during Ramadan. A survivor stated to Human Rights Watch that the funeral was interrupted by the jihadists arriving on motorcycles, and many of the attendees ran away, leaving the old and sick to fend for themselves. The jihadists interrogated the remaining attendees, asking them where Nigerien forces were positioned in the area. When the attendees didn't know, the jihadists yelled "Lie down, now!', and counted in Pulaar to 'one, two, three …' until reaching 12. Then they opened fire. One jihadist started walking around, checking to make sure [they] were dead ... When our army fired a few mortar rounds, the jihadists panicked and sped off toward the Mali border."

Another group of the detachment of jihadists chased after the attendees that had fled the funeral. The attack lasted for about an hour until the Nigerien forces began shelling the area. Governor of Tillabéri Region Ibrahim Tidjani Katiella stated that the jihadists had surrounded the village before the massacre, and after shooting the funeral attendees began shooting indiscriminately at anyone they saw in Gaigorou. Nineteen people were killed in total during the attack, and two others were injured.
