= Mangaïzé attack =

2014 battle between Niger and al-Mourabitoun

- Part of Jihadist insurgency in Niger
Date	October 30, 2014
Location	Mangaïzé refugee camp, Ouallam Department, Niger
Result	al-Mourabitoun victory

Belligerents
Niger	al-Mourabitoun

Casualties and losses
9 killed 4 injured 3 missing	2 killed 4 POWs
- 1 civilian killed, 2 injured

On October 30, 2014, militants from al-Mourabitoun attacked a refugee camp in Mangaïzé, Niger as part of a simultaneous three-pronged attack on Nigerien forces in Mangaïzé, Ouallam, and Bani-Bangou.

== Background ==
Jihadists launched a coordinated attack on three locations in Ouallam Department on October 30, 2014. While the attacks were not claimed by any particular group, Mauritanian journalist Lemine Ould Mohamed Salem stated that the attacks were likely carried out by al-Mourabitoun under the command of Mokhtar Belmokhtar. The attackers came from Mali. The attack on October 30 took place in three areas of Ouallam Department; the prison in Ouallam, the Malian refugee camp in Mangaïzé, and a military patrol in Bani-Bangou.

== Attack ==
At the time of the attack, 6,000 to 9,000 refugees were present in Mangaïzé. At 5 a.m., the attackers opened fire on the camp's security post. The refugees were not targeted directly, and many fled once the jihadists opened fire. Sixteen jihadists arrived on eight motorcycles, setting fire to the security post. After the brief battle, the jihadists paraded through the refugee camp and then dispersed. In Ouallam, a second group arrived at 6 a.m. and attacked the town's prison. The jihadists seized control of the building and freed 58 prisoners. The attackers retreated after Nigerien reinforcements were dispatched.

== Aftermath ==
The Nigerien Ministry of Defense and the Ministry of the Interior reported that five police officers, two gendarmes, and two National Guard servicemen were killed. Two gendarmes, a police officer, and a serviceman were wounded, and a gendarme, a police officer, and a security guard were missing. The nine soldiers killed were in Mangaïzé, and no deaths were recorded at Ouallam.

The Nigerien Minister of Justice stated two jihadists were killed and four were taken prisoner in the attacks, and a refugee woman was killed. The UNHCR stated that two civilians were also shot in the Mangaïzé attack.
