= Battle of Taroun (2020) =

- Part of Jihadist insurgency in Niger
Date	21 December 2020
Location	Ouallam, Niger
Result	Nigerien victory

Belligerents
Niger	Islamic State in the Greater Sahara

Strength
Unknown	Unknown

Casualties and losses
8	11

The Battle of Taroun took place between Niger and the Islamic State on December 21, 2020.

== Battle ==
On the morning of Monday, December 21, a patrol of the Nigerien army falls into an ambush near Taroun, 57 kilometers northeast of Ouallam, near the Malian border. However, the jihadists are repelled, and the Nigerien military then launches a counterattack.

== Aftermath ==
According to the statement from the Nigerien Ministry of Defense released on December 24, seven Nigerien soldiers were killed, two were injured in the confrontation, along with one civilian. Additionally, four jihadists were killed in the ambush, and seven others in the "counterattack." Motorcycles and weapons were also recovered.
