= Karma, Niger =

Karma
- Commune
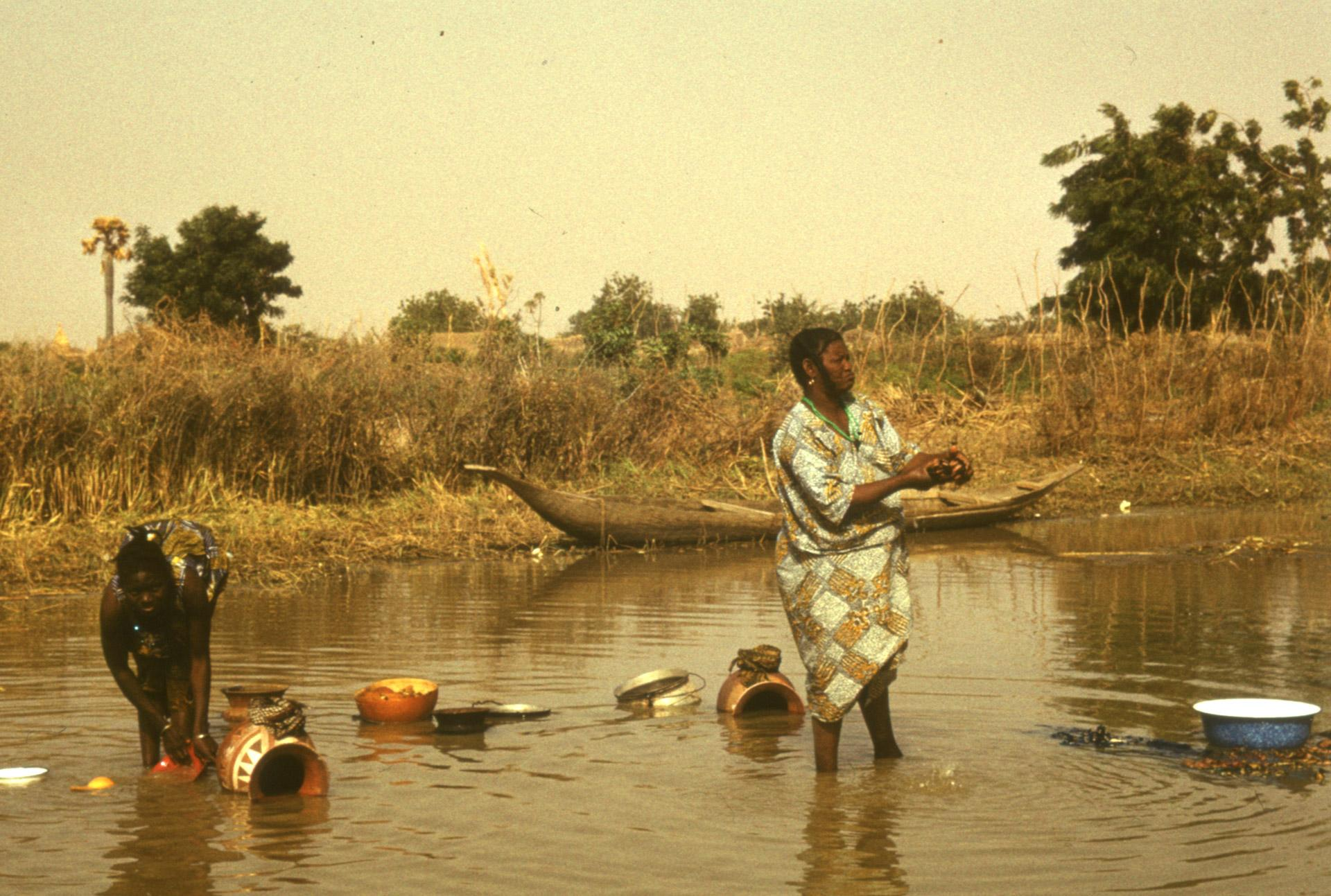
- Women washing dishes in Karma, 1976

- Location in Niger
- Coordinates: 13°40′19″N 1°48′48″E
- Country: Niger
- Region: Tillabéri Region
- Department: Kollo Department

Population (2012)
  - Commune: 88,244
  - Urban: 8,505 (town)

Karma is a town and a rural commune in southwestern Niger, near the city of Niamey. The town had a population of 8,505 at the 2012 census, while the commune had a population of 88,244.

Apart from Karma itself, the commune counts various other villages and hamlets, such as Boubon, a village known for its lively weekly market on Wednesdays and the colorful pottery produced there.

== Geography ==
Karma lies on a plateau with wide valleys on the Niger River. The commune borders the municipalities of Kourteye in the northwest, Simiri in the north, Hamdallaye in the east, Bitinkodji in the south, and Namaro in the southwest.

The commune includes 70 villages, 56 hamlets, and 10 camps. The table below ranks the villages in the commune by population:

Village	Population (2012)	Location
Karma	8,505	13°40′19″N 1°48′48″E
Tagabati	5,075	13°38′10″N 1°52′51″E
Niamé	2,575	13°40′14″N 1°47′30″E
Bangawi Zarma	2,428	13°39′18″N 1°50′54″E
Koutoukalé Kourtey	2,536	13°41′08″N 1°43′36″E
Koutoukalé Zéno	2,455	13°41′37″N 1°44′36″E
Boubon	1,829	13°36′09″N 1°55′38″E
Koutoukalé Kado	1,678	13°40′52″N 1°44′11″E
Koutoukalé Koira Tégui	1,292	13°42′13″N 1°43′34″E
Kanta	882	13°39′55″N 1°50′15″E
Zama Koira Zéno	841	13°43′12″N 1°42′10″E
Zama Koira Tégui	772	13°42′38″N 1°42′59″E
Bantouré	748	13°39′34″N 1°49′50″E
Komba Goura	509	13°40′31″N 1°45′53″E
Kondo Tondi	434	13°44′58″N 1°41′31″E
Kanazi	382	13°35′23″N 1°57′41″E
Karma Goungou	317	13°39′38″N 1°48′37″E

== History ==
The village of Boubon in the commune was founded in around 1340, by a Songhai group. After the fall of the Songhai Empire in 1591, Songhai refugees settled in Karma, under a descendant of the former ruling Askiya dynasty. In the 17th century, Zarma settled around the town and in the 19th century, the town was raided by enemy Zarma from N'Dounga.

=== Modern ===
In 1906, the French colonial administration established a canton in Karma. The rural commune was formed in 2002, during a nationwide administrative reform.

The commune of Karma was seriously affected by the 2010 West African floods, with over 15,000 residents of the commune classified as disaster victims. Karma was the second hardest hit commune in Niger after Namaro in the southwest.

== Politics ==
The municipal council (conseil municipal) has 22 elected members. A traditional chief heads 65 villages in the commune, including the main town.

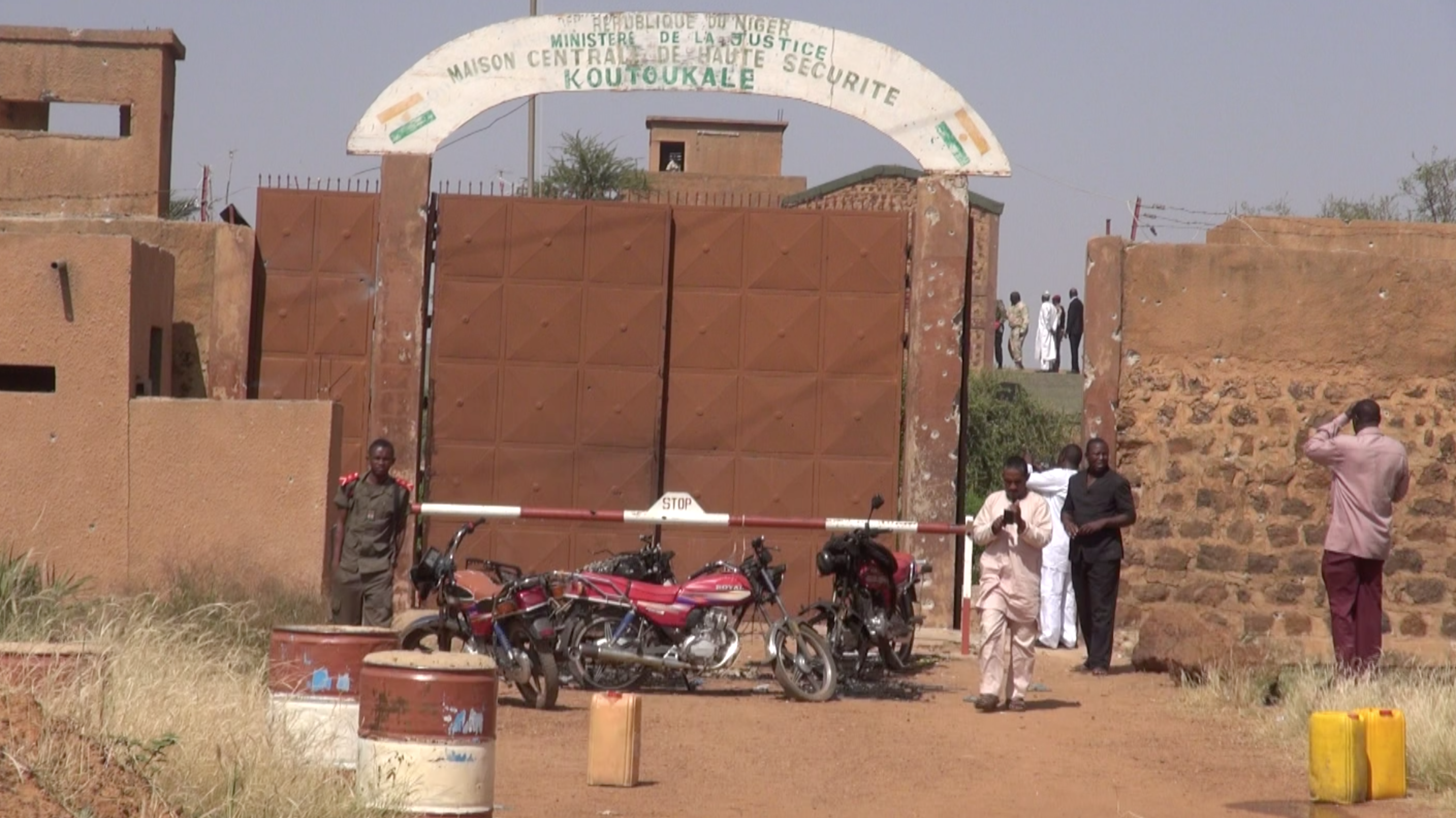
The Koutoukalé prison gate after a terrorist attack in 2016.

Karma also hosts the Koutoukalé maximum security prison, which is the only high security prison in Niger and can accommodate 250 inmates.

== Economy and infrastructure ==
The main source of income in the commune is agriculture in the bush and rice cultivation on the banks of the Niger. In Karma there is a daily market with around twenty shops and restaurants as well as a weekly market with over 400 exhibitors.

In the main town of Karma, there is a Center de Santé Intégré (CSI) health center which has its own laboratory and maternity ward, and was responsible for caring for over 36,000 people in 2016. There is also another CSI health center in Koutoukalé, which cared from over 12,000 people in 2016.

The main road in the commune is National Road 1, the main road in the country.
