= 2017 Tilwa attack =

Battle in Niger

- Part of Jihadist insurgency in Niger
Date	February 22, 2017
Location	Tilwa, Ouallam Department, Niger
Result	ISGS victory

Belligerents
Niger	Islamic State in the Greater Sahara

Commanders and leaders
Unknown	Adnan Abu Walid al-Sahrawi

Casualties and losses
16 killed 18 injured 4 pickups destroyed 7 pickups captured	Unknown

On February 22, 2017, jihadists from Islamic State in the Greater Sahara (ISGS) attacked Nigerien forces in Tilwa, Ouallam Department, Niger.

== Background ==
The Islamic State in the Greater Sahara was recognized by the Islamic State in October 2016 after Adnan Abu Walid al-Sahrawi split off from MOJWA and pledged allegiance to caliph Abu Bakr al-Baghdadi a year prior. ISGS first began attacking Nigerien forces in October 2016 at Koutoukole prison in Niger and possibly in an attack at a refugee camp in Tazalit. The next confirmed attack by ISGS took place in Bani-Bangou, when the group raided a Nigerien outpost.

== Attack ==
Around 4pm on February 22, a Nigerien army patrol was attacked in Tilwa, near the town of Tirzawene, around ten kilometers from the Malian border. The attackers rode on dozens of motorcycles and pick-ups. Fighting continued between the Nigerien forces and the jihadists into much of the night, and French, Malian, and Nigerien reinforcements were dispatched from their bases along the Nigerien-Malian border. Later in the night, the ISGS jihadists retreated towards Mali. Malian and French forces then began conducting patrols around the area.

The Islamic State in the Greater Sahara claimed responsibility for the attack on February 24 via Mauritanian news agency Sahara Media. In the statement, ISGS stated that the attack was directly organized and sponsored by al-Sahrawi. They claimed responsibility a second time on January 12, 2018, through the Nouakchott Information Agency.

== Aftermath ==
A military source speaking to Jeune Afrique and RFI reported that at least eleven soldiers were killed, four vehicles burned and seven captured. Another source speaking to AFP stated two soldiers were killed and 12 missing along with several vehicles burned or captured. Army spokesman Colonel Touré Seydou Albdoula Aziz announced the next day that 15 Nigerien soldiers were killed and 19 were injured. One soldier succumbed to his injuries later on, making the toll 16 dead and 18 injured. ISGS claimed 12 soldiers were killed and seven were taken hostage.

The Nigerien government declared three days of national mourning and French troops of Operation Barkhane announced the deployment of 50 to 80 men in Tillabéri Region.
