= Hamdallaye, Niger =

- Commune and village
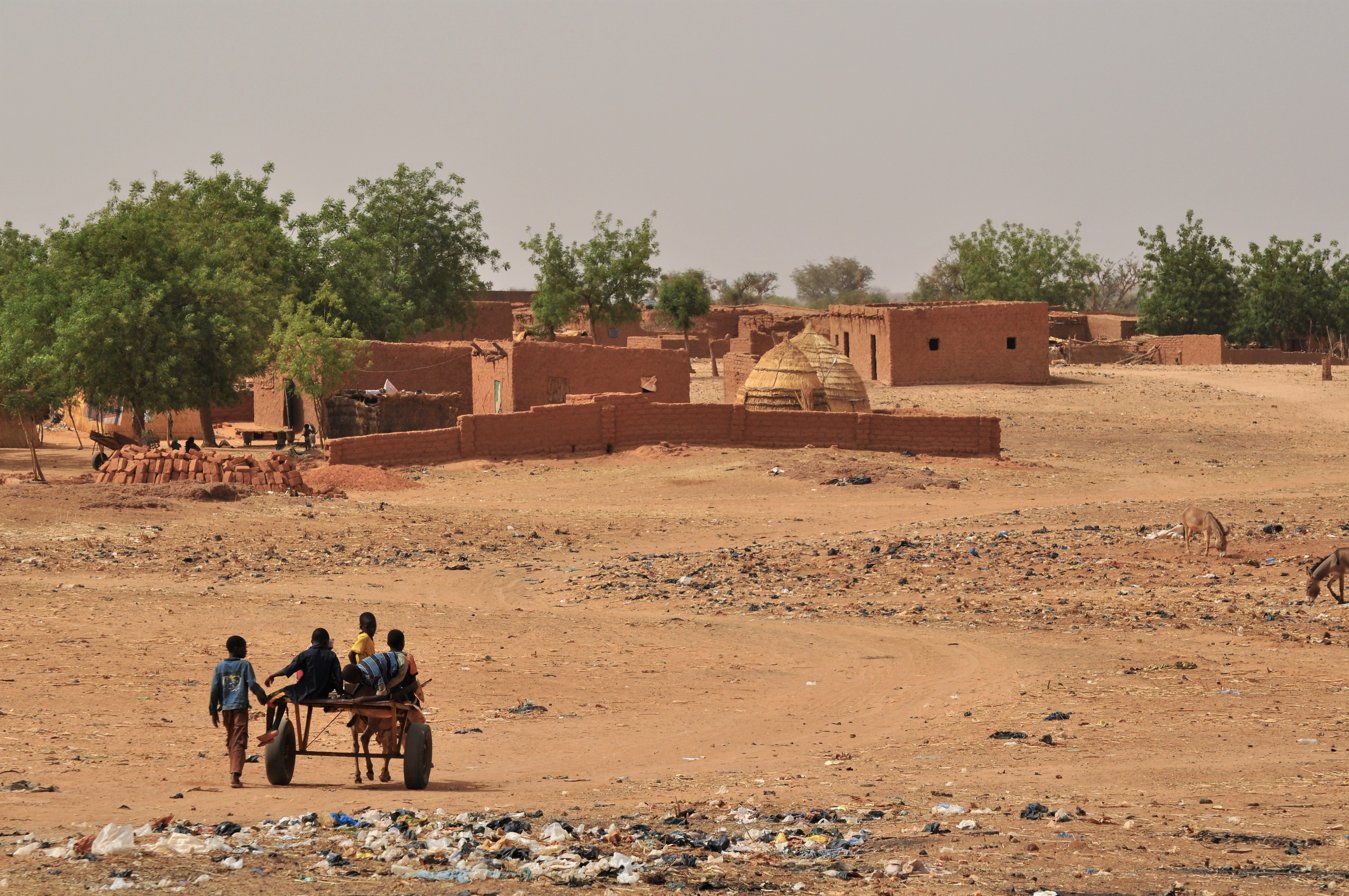
- Children with donkey cart in Hamdallaye

- Location in Niger
- Coordinates: 13°33′25″N 02°24′26″E
- Country: Niger
- Region: Tillabéri Region
- Department: Kollo Department

Area
  - Total: 683 sq mi (1,769 km^{2})

Population (2012)
  - Total: 57,002
  - Density: 83.46/sq mi (32.22/km^{2})
- Time zone: UTC+1 (WAT)

Hamdallaye is a village and rural commune in Niger. In 2012, it had a registered population of 57,002 inhabitants. It is located in the southwest of the country, near the Niger River, the border with Mali and Burkina Faso and the national capital, Niamey. It is the location of a U.S. Peace Corps training site, a weekly market and a mosque.

== Description ==
Hamdallaye is in the semi arid Sahel region, northeast of the Niger capital Niamey. Hamdallaye's other neighboring communities are Karma to the northwest, Simiri to the north, Tagazar to the northeast, Dantchandou to the southeast, and Kouré, Liboré and N'Dounga to the south. The settlements in the municipality include 54 villages, 27 hamlets and a waterpoint. The main settlement is the eponymous village of Hamdallaye. Other large villages in the municipality are Barkiawal Béri, Fandou Béri, Fatakadjé, Gardama Koira, Gounou Bangou, Kayan Zarma, Lawèye, Ouratondi and Tondigamèye.

Agriculture is fed by water from the watershed of nearby 40-metre-high plateaus. Wood is gathered from the distinctive tiger bush, a natural landscape made up of contour-following strips of grass, bushes, 2- to 5-metre-high trees and bare ground. Farmers have about ten hectares for each home, and raise cattle, sheep and goats.

In 1991 it was found that 50% of the land is left to fallow for about three years at a time. Degradation was taking place, but because there were four villages involved in the local water system no one body could sort out the problem. Historically farmers would use land for four years and then leave it to fallow for ten and they could supplement the soil with manure from migrating wildlife. However the need for more food means that fallow periods have been reduced and in some cases disappeared, and wildlife no longer migrates in such large numbers. Inorganic fertilisers work but the farmers cannot afford to use them. A study has shown that erosion is taking place; it was identified by locals but they did not feel responsible. The land is mutually understood to be owned by the community and anyone can exploit it but no one is required to manage it.

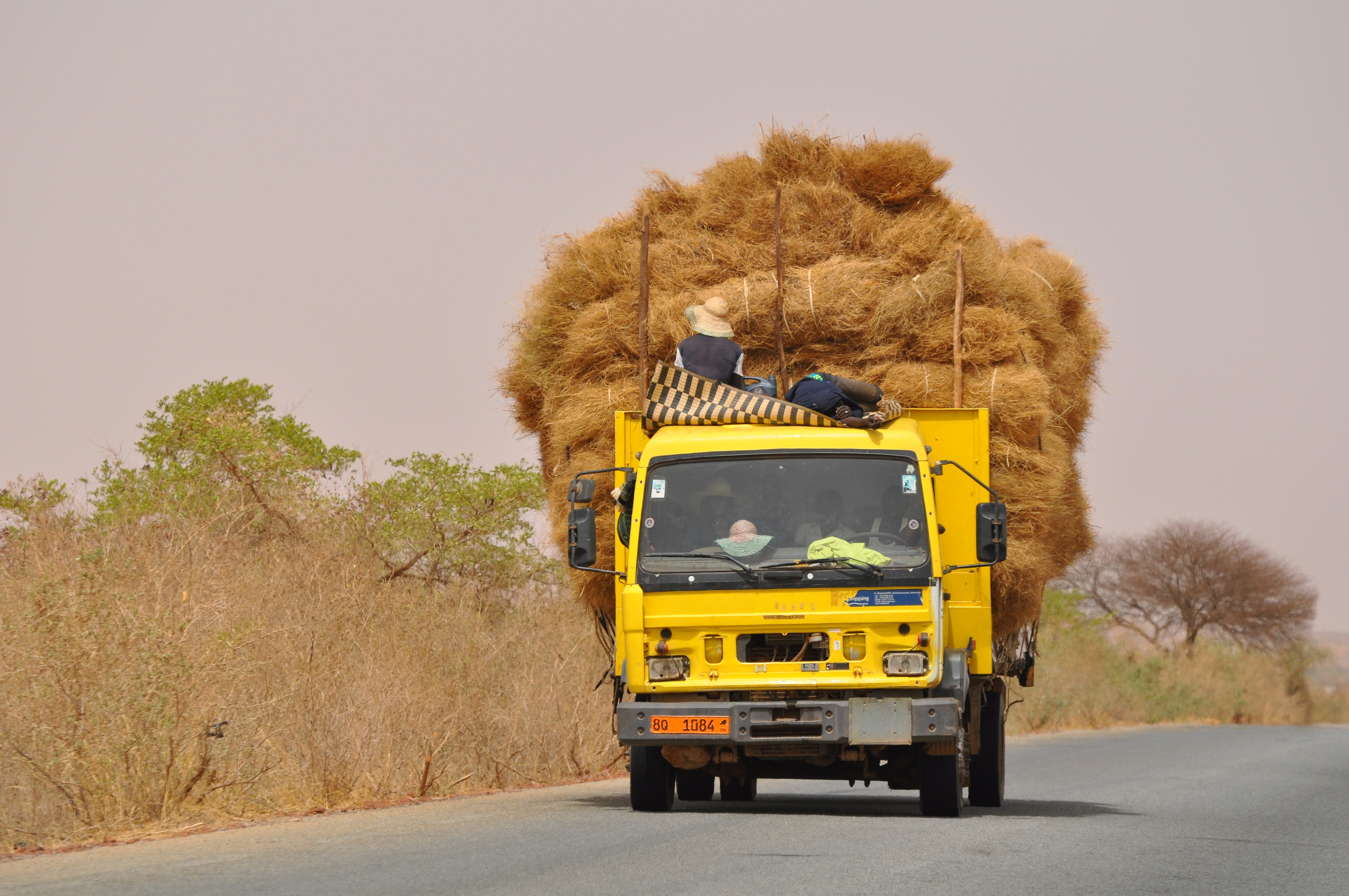
Haymaking in Hamdallaye

The village has a savings-and-loan scheme (Mata Masu Dubara) operating and supported by CARE International. In 2014, Hadjo Djibo, one of fourteen local councillors, organised the purchase of eight grinding machines that can handle maize and millet, which is the principal crop. These grinding machines took over a job done at home by young girls, meaning that they were then able to attend the local school.

In 2020 during the COVID-19 pandemic in Niger there was an increased demand for hygiene products. Hamdallaye had a small self-help co-operative that was offering work to refugees from Libya who were staying in the "emergency transit mechanism" in the village. Using funding from UNHCR, the group expanded production to manufacture soap, bleach, handwash and water containers. 280 women were involved, but they worked in groups of no more than ten women in order that they could comply with local guidelines. The products were distributed without charge.
