= Manda massacre =

2025 massacre in Niger

- Part of Jihadist insurgency in Niger
- Location: Manda, Gorouol commune, Tillaberi Region, Niger
- Date: June 20, 2025; Nighttime
- Target: Muslim worshippers
- Deaths: 71+
- Injuries: 20+
- Perpetrator: Islamic State - Sahel Province

On 20 June 2025, jihadists from the Islamic State – Sahel Province (ISGS) attacked the village of Manda, Tillabéri Region, Niger, killing at least 71 civilians.

== Background ==
The Islamic State's Sahel Province, most active in Niger, has a grisly history of targeting civilian communities en masse when these communities refuse to pay zakat taxes or submit to IS rule. The group is most active along the tri-border area between Mali, Burkina Faso, and Niger, targeting border communes in Tillaberi along the Niger river. In March, ISGS militants killed 44 civilians at a mosque in Fambita. A week before the massacre in Manda, ISGS militants attacked and killed 31 Nigerien soldiers near Banibangou, close to Manda.

== Massacre ==
Villagers in Manda were attending a Muslim sermon at night in front of the town's mosque at the time of the attack on June 20. Details of the attack are scant due to no government or NGO response following the attack, with both groups seeking to avoid getting caught in a jihadist ambush. Survivors of the attack, of which there were "very few", stated that they hid under bodies to survive. A security source in Nigeria said that at least 71 people were killed in the attack, with the true death toll being unknown. Four sons of the village chief were killed during the massacre.

At least twenty people were wounded during the attack, and many of the survivors fled to Téra or Niamey. On 23 June, the Nigerien army was deployed near Manda but no rescue mission for the wounded occurred. Nigerien authorities did not comment on the attack.

== Aftermath ==
The heavy death toll of the Manda massacre, combined with the prior heavy casualties in Banibangou, prompted Nigerien soldiers to mutiny on 24 June against going to secure convoys to and from Burkina Faso with no air support. On July 5, Nigerien forces fought heavy battles in Bouloundjounga and Samira against ISGS forces.
