= Wanzarbé attack =

2017 battle in Niger

- Part of Jihadist insurgency in Niger
| Date | March 6, 2017 |
| Location | Between Wanzarbé and Yatakala, Tillaberi Region, Niger |
| Result | Indecisive |

Belligerents
| Niger | Islamic State in the Greater Sahara |

Casualties and losses
| 5–7 killed 4 injured 1 vehicle destroyed | Unknown |

On March 6, 2017, Islamic State in the Greater Sahara (ISGS) militants attacked Nigerien forces between Wanzarbe and Yatakala, Niger.

== Background ==
The Islamic State in the Greater Sahara (ISGS) splintered off from MOJWA in the mid-2010's and became an official Islamic State branch in 2016 with Adnan Abu Walid al-Sahrawi as leader. They launched their first attacks in Niger in October 2016, on the Koutokole prison and possibly in Tazalit. In February 2017, the group attacked Nigerien forces again in Tilwa, in rural Tillabéri Region, killing dozens of Nigerien soldiers. Three days prior to the attack in Wanzarbe, the Nigerien government declared a state of emergency in Tillaberi and Tahoua Region.

== Attack ==
The attack took place in the morning of March 6, in the same area where three Nigerien gendarmes had been killed a year prior. A Nigerien gendarme post in between the villages of Wanzarbe and Yatakala, Tillabéri Region, near the Malian and Burkinabe border. The jihadists were unable to take the outpost, however, and fled. The Nigerien army began combing operations in the area after the attack was reported, and French forces launched two planes and three helicopters from Gao.

Initially, Nigerien officials reported that four soldiers were killed in the attack. This toll was revised to five killed an hour later and one vehicle destroyed. However, Voice of America stated that seven soldiers were killed and four were injured. The ISGS claimed responsibility for the attack on January 12, 2018.
