= Petel Kole attack =

2022 mass killing in Niger

- Part of Jihadist insurgency in Niger
- Location: Petel Kole border outpost, Niger
- Date: March 17, 2022
- Deaths: 21 killed: 19 civilians killed; 2 policemen killed
- Injuries: 5
- Perpetrator: Islamic State – Sahil Province (per ACLED)

On March 17, 2022, suspected Islamic State - Sahel Province militants attacked a bus traveling from Burkina Faso to Téra, Niger, in the Nigerien village of Petel Kole, killing at least twenty-one people including two Nigerien police officers.

== Prelude ==
Throughout the jihadist insurgency in Niger, the Burkinabe-Nigerien border, in particular the tripoint area between Burkina Faso, Mali, and Niger, has been a hotbed of jihadist violence by groups such as the Islamic State in the Greater Sahara (which renamed to IS - Sahel in March 2022). The Petel Kole border post, directly on the border between Burkina Faso and Niger, has seen several attacks by ISGS since the jihadist insurgency spread to Niger. An October 2021 attack killed three Nigerien police officers and wounded several others at Petel Kole.

== Attack ==
As the bus reached the border post from Burkina Faso, several attackers on motorcycles drove up to the bus and set fire to it. The bus was carrying dozens of people, and lots of fruits and vegetables at the time. In the attack, nineteen civilians on the bus were killed, and two policemen manning the border post were killed in the fire as well. Two others were killed whenever the truck behind the bus caught fire as well. Five people were injured, including a policemen, and the wounded were sent to Niamey for treatment. Seven people also managed to escape the bus, including four women and three men.

== Aftermath ==
Nigerien security sources claimed to have recaptured the Petel Kole border post after the attack, and deployed reinforcements to the area. The Nigerien Modern Transport Company, which owns the bus that was attacked, announced a halt in bus departures between Niger and Burkina Faso after the attack.
