= 2025 Banibangou attack =

2025 terrorist attack in Niger

- Part of Islamist insurgency in Niger
Date	19 June 2025
Location	Banibangou, Tillaberi Region, Niger
Result	ISSP victory: Banibangou under brief ISSP control

Belligerents
Niger	Islamic State - Sahel Province

Strength
Unknown	~350

Casualties and losses
71 killed 14+ injured	<5 (per IS)

On 19 June 2025, several hundred militants from the Islamic State – Sahel Province attacked the Nigerien military base at Banibangou, killing at least 71 soldiers. The attack was one of the deadliest on the base at Banibangou in recent years.

== Background ==
In July 2023, disgruntled officers overthrew Nigerien president Mohamed Bazoum in a coup, claiming that Bazoum's government was not effectively countering the insurgencies of the Islamic State – Sahel Province (ISSP) and Jama'at Nasr al-Islam wal-Muslimin in the western part of the country. JNIM and ISGS are most active in the tri-border area between Niger, Mali, and Burkina Faso, the latter two having had coups that installed military juntas within the past two years.

The rural outpost of Banibangou has been attacked many times during the insurgency by the Islamic State. In 2016, an ambush killed five soldiers in rural Banibangou department, and in 2023 a convoy of soldiers headed to Banibangou was ambushed near Intagamey. In May 2025, the Islamic State launched a brutal raid on the Eknewane base in Tillia, killing at least 64 soldiers. Prior to the attack, soldiers at the base had been warned that columns of motorcycles were headed towards the base from Mali.

== Attack ==
On the morning of 19 June 2025, at approximately 09:00 local time, several hundred armed men launched a coordinated attack on a Nigerien army base in the western town of Banibangou, near the border with Mali. The Nigerien Ministry of Defense described the assault as "carried out by a horde of several hundred mercenaries onboard eight vehicles and more than 200 motorcycles." Libération reported that around 350 attackers took part in the storming of the base.

At the same time as the base attack, jihadists stormed the town of Banibangou from the south and the northeast. ISSP militants seized control of the National Guard camps, the rpefecture, and positions of the gendarmerie and army. After fighting ceased, the city was burned and looted. The perpetrators withdrew towards Mali.

== Aftermath ==
The Nigerien Ministry of Defense stated on June 20 that 34 soldiers were killed and 14 were wounded in the attack. RFI reported that the commander of the base was killed during the attack. By June 26, the Nigerien death toll had increased to 71 killed.

Nigerien officials claimed that "dozens of terrorists" were killed after the battle following the arrival of reinforcements. However, Liberation reported that the jihadists' movements were closely monitored by civilians during the course of the attack, and no Nigerien reinforcements were ever deployed. The Islamic State claimed responsibility for the attack, claiming to have controlled the city for 2 hours and the seizure of 25 vehicles. IS also said that the number of their fighters killed "did not exceed the number of fingers on one hand".

On June 24, soldiers in the 13th Combined Arms Battalion of Filingué refused to go on a relief mission to Banibangou without first obtaining more resources and air support. The next day, the mobile border company of Téra, with the corps commander being beaten and hospitalized.
