= 2021 Adab-Dab attack =

2021 terrorist attack in Niger

- Part of the jihadist insurgency in Niger
- Location: Adab-Dab, Tillabéri Region, Niger
- Date: 2 November 2021
- Deaths: 69
- Injuries: Unknown
- Perpetrator: Islamic State in the Greater Sahara

On 2 November 2021, gunmen of the Islamic State in the Greater Sahara ambushed a delegation being held by the mayor of Bani-Bangou in the village of Adab-Dab, Niger. The attack killed the town mayor and 68 others.

== Background ==
Niger has had a jihadist insurgency since 2015, when Islamist groups from Mali began to spread their influence into the country. Since then, the "tri-border" area between Niger, Mali, and Burkina Faso has been the epicenter for jihadism. At least 74 jihadist attacks were carried out in Niger and 530 people were killed by them in 2021.

== Attack ==
The attack began at around 8:30 GMT when gunmen on motorcycles attacked a delegation in the village of Adab-Dab. The delegation was being held by the mayor of Bani-Bangou, a town just 55 kilometers (32 miles) away. The gunmen mainly targeted members of local self-defense militias. After the attack, the perpetrators fled to Mali, taking the bodies of dead fighters with them. 69 people were killed during the attack, including Bani-Bangou's mayor and the leader of a local self-defense militia, and only 15 survived, several of them wounded.

== Reactions ==
=== Domestic ===
Niger's government declared two days of national mourning after the attack.

=== International ===
France

- France condemned the attack "in the strongest possible terms" and offered its condolences to the families of the victims and the Nigerien people. France also stated that it stands with Niger to combat terrorism and protect its people.

United States

- The United States condemned the attack and expressed their "most heartfelt" condolences to the victims and their families. They described the attack as "ungodly" and "unholy," and stated that there is no need for cowardly attacks against civilians in the modern world.

Turkey

- The Turkish Foreign Ministry strongly condemned the attack, and described it as a "heinous terrorist attack".
