= Boubon =

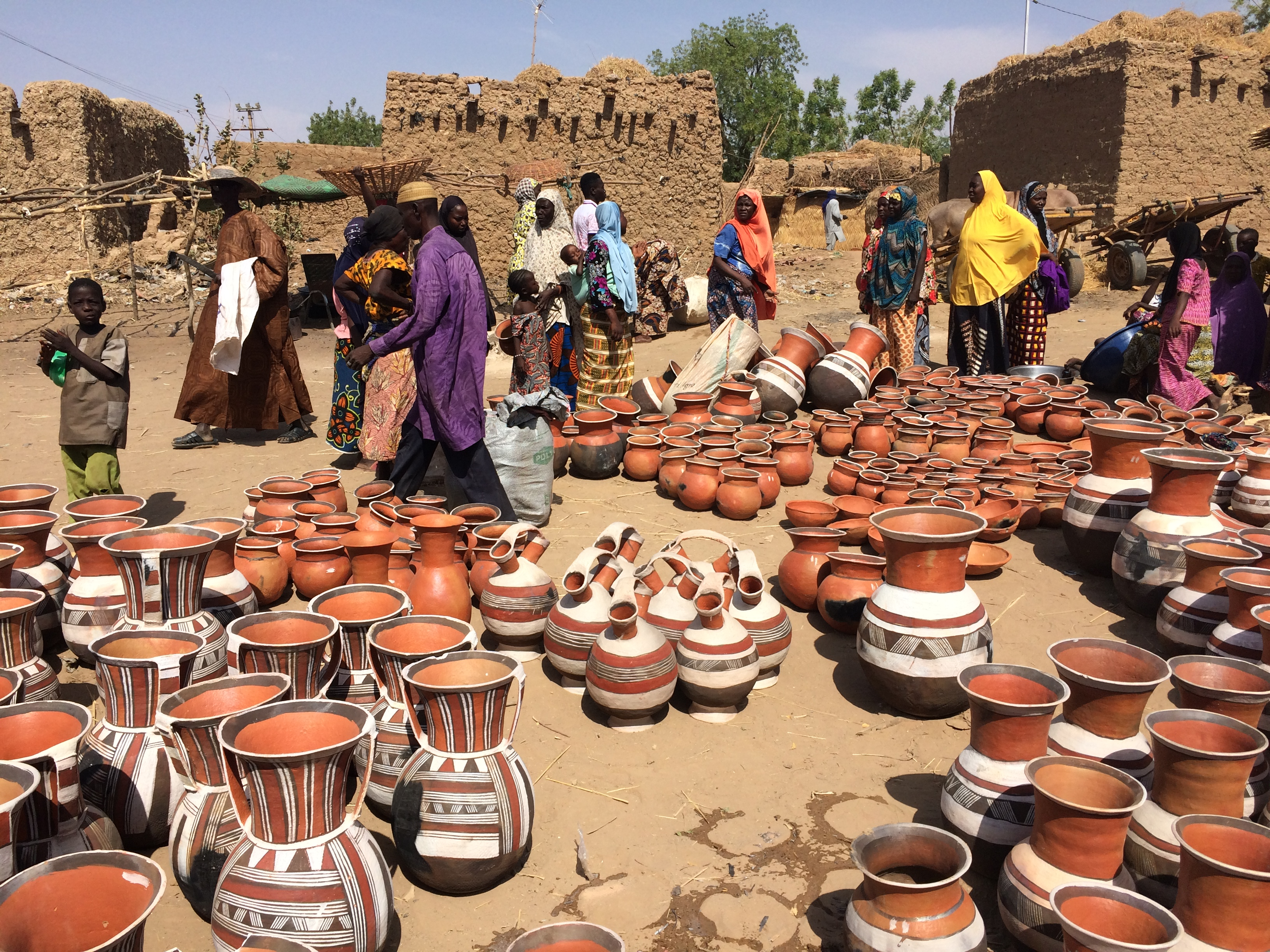
- Pottery market in Boubon

- Location in Niger
- Coordinates: 13°36′5.72″N 1°55′34.21″E
- Country: Niger
- Region: Tillabéry Region
- Department: Kollo Department
- Rural communes of Niger: Karma Commune
- Elevation: 195–199 m (640–653 ft)

Boubon is a large village in southwestern Niger (West Africa), 27.8 km to the northwest of the centre of the capital Niamey.
It lies on the left bank of the Niger River in the Commune of Karma, Department of Kollo, Region of Tillabéry. On the eastern side Boubon is bordered by the sandy bed of an intermittent stream, the Guendiora, that flows into the Niger here. On the northern and western sides, Boubon is hemmed in by low rocky slopes of the Nigérien plateau.
The road from Niamey to Boubon is tarmacked. Facing Boubon on the opposite shore of the Niger River are the villages Béri, Dambou Béri, Sarando Béné and Sarando Ganda.

Boubon is one of the major pottery centers of Niger even though there is no large scale or centralized production: pottery is made by women in individual households. The pots are sold on the large and colourful weekly market on Wednesdays where also cattle is bought and sold, and meat, fruits, vegetables, household articles, clothing, shoes, etc.
There used to be a Campement Touristique on the island in the river facing Boubon, with a restaurant, a pool, and cabins to stay for the night. Mainly expatriates from Niamey came here, crossing to the island by pirogue. But it has been closed for a number of years and it now looks abandoned and derelict.

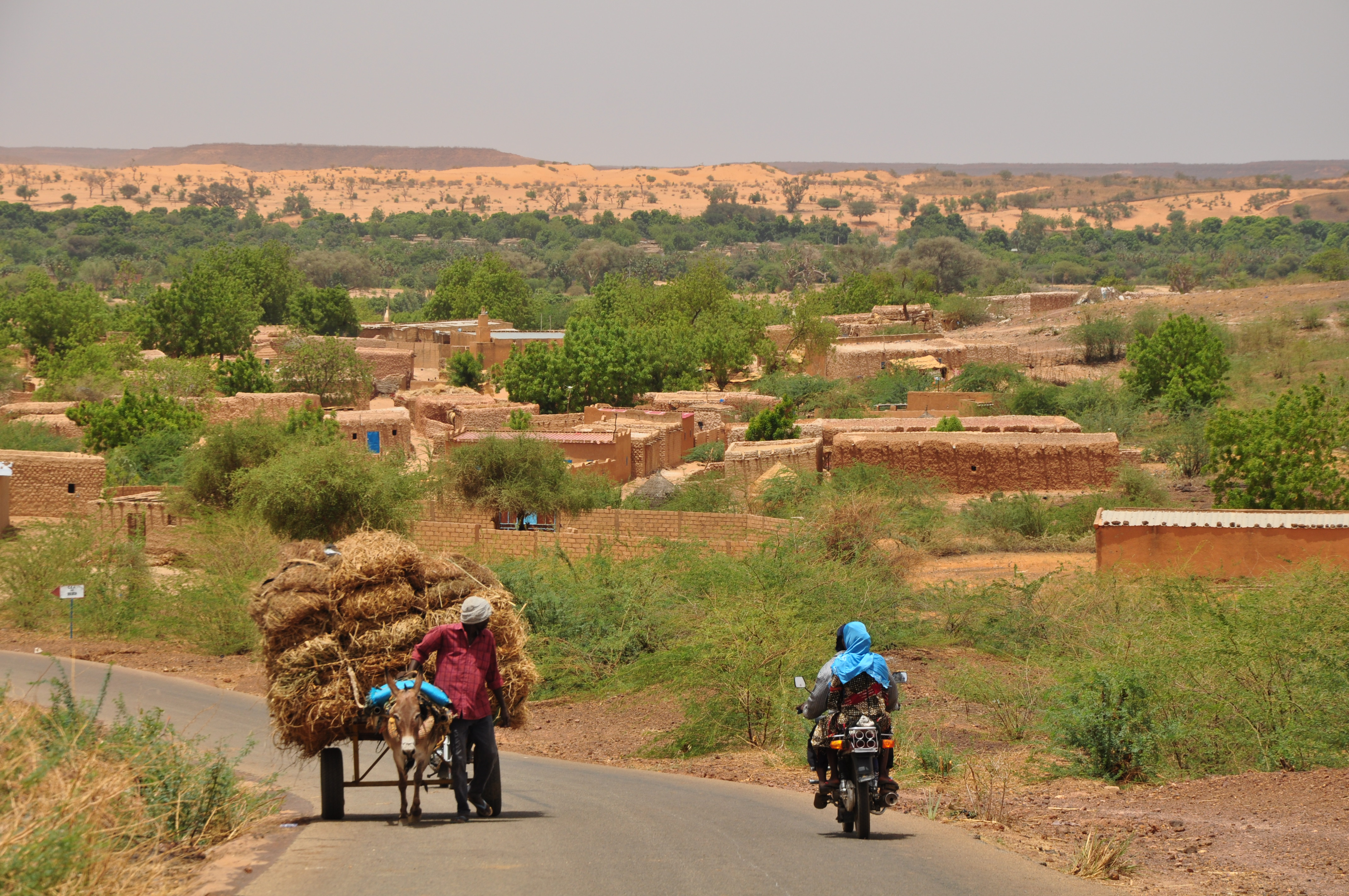
Road entering the village

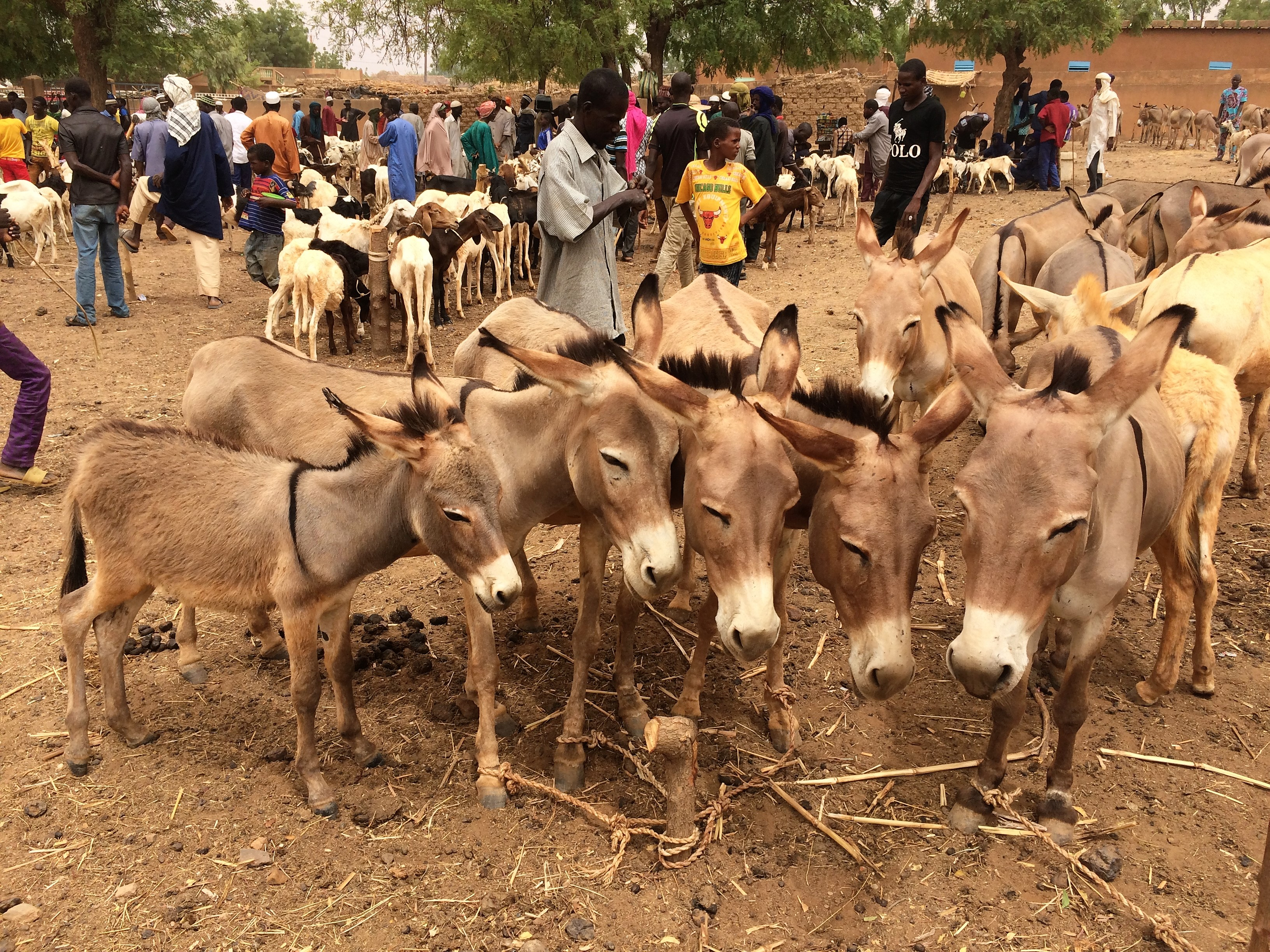
Donkeys for sale at the weekly livestock market

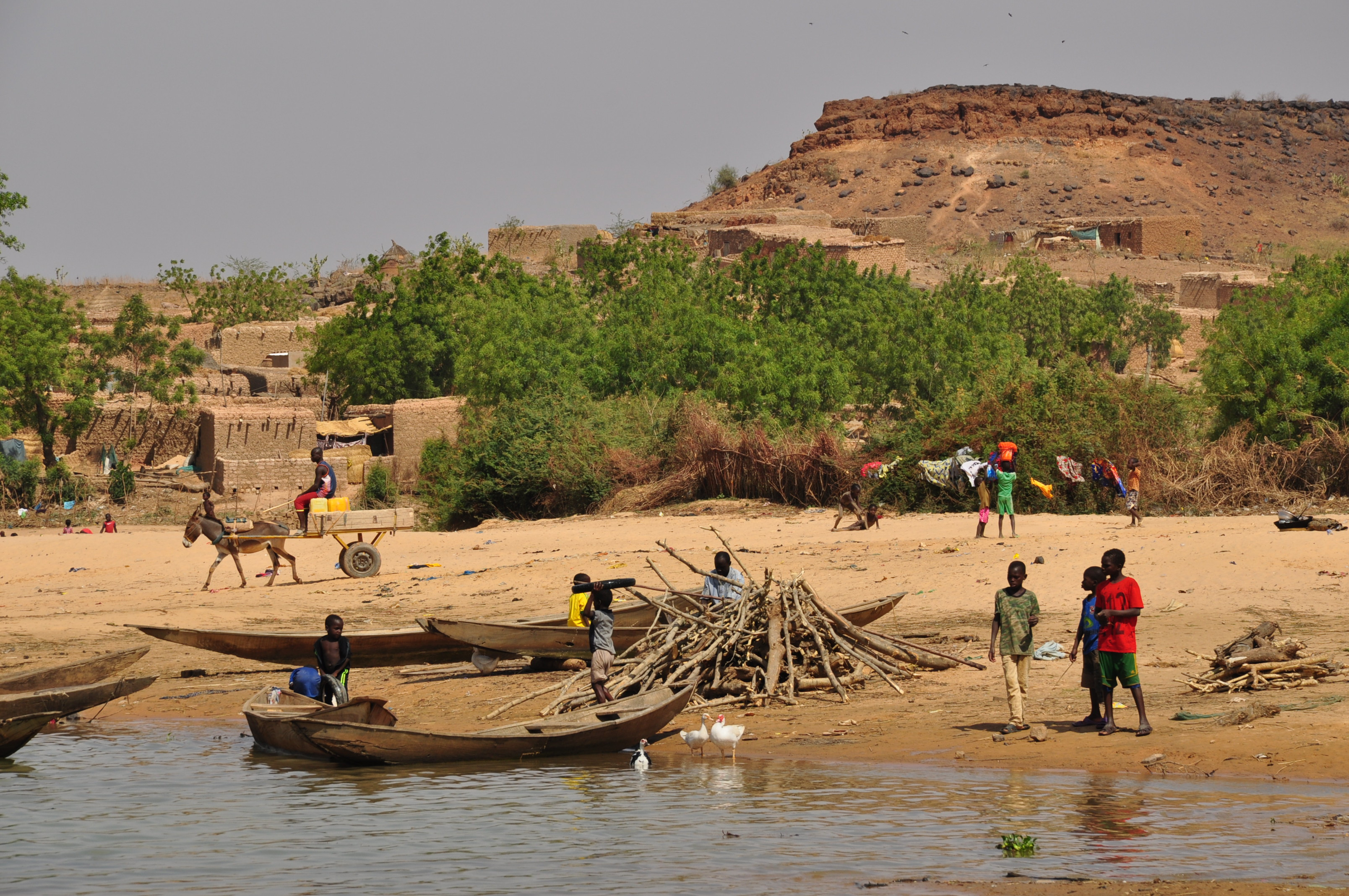
Waterfront scene

== Struggle against French colonial rule ==
Boubon played a role in the resistance against French colonial rule and as a consequence the village was burned down by the French in 1906. The story goes as follows:
In the Songhai areas of Niger, the revolt against the French occupation was orchestrated by Morou (or Oumarou), chief of the canton of Karma, a town on the river Niger a few miles upstream from Boubon. Karma was a meeting point for farmers, fishermen, and nomadic populations. The village had a hard time coughing up the taxes imposed on it by the French. Even the French commander Löffler at the time recognized this, saying the taxes "are imposed with an efficiency facilitated by the proximity of the chief town - Niamey - and they are paid without the natives being able to seize any justification, if not that of force". Then, in 1905 Morou, (who had already had trouble with an earlier French ruler, Captain Chanoine in 1899), was falsely accused of having refused to provide food claimed for the French troops established in the region. Arrested, he had to carry a goat skin filled with water to Niamey (45 km), walking barefoot in front of the riders of the canton of Niamey.
After his release, back in Karma, Morou pondered his revenge. First, he decided not to pay any taxes anymore to the French. He then had the French officer who came to ask him for an explanation assassinated. Then, being a realist, Morou consulted the neighboring villages Boubon, Sorbon Haoussa, Sakaraara, Namari-goungou, and others and managed to gather around 1200 warriors. The leaders of the allied villages began to buy horses: the great settling of accounts with the white men was thus actively prepared. Imaginative, Morou cut the telegraph line Niamey-Tera and the wire thus obtained was used to make arrows. Then, as if he had not already provoked the French enough, during the night of January 9-10th, 1906, he had the French Lieutenant Fabre -who went down towards Niamey by the river- murdered, and looted his boat. Summoned to Niamey to justify the interruption of the telegraph line, Morou refused to go. A confrontation became thus inevitable.
The authorities in Niamey asked for reinforcements from Dori, Tahoua and Zinder. A column of repression of nearly 300 regular and auxiliary men took the direction of Karma on January 16, 1906, under the command of Captain Bouchez. The next morning, not far from Boubon, the French column faced the troops of Morou: 700 men (300 riders and 400 archers) hidden in the scattered thickets on the slopes of the plateau. The fight raged only briefly, as the firepower of the French troops imposed itself easily. Morou and his partisans dispersed in the direction of the Zarmaganda Plateau and Captain Bouchez torched the villages of Boubon and Karma -abandoned by their inhabitants.
On March 2, 1906, Captain Bouchez set off in pursuit of the fugitives at the head of a 160-strong force. Morou and his followers were crushed in the Zarmaganda. Villages that had dared to grant hospitality to the chief were severely punished.

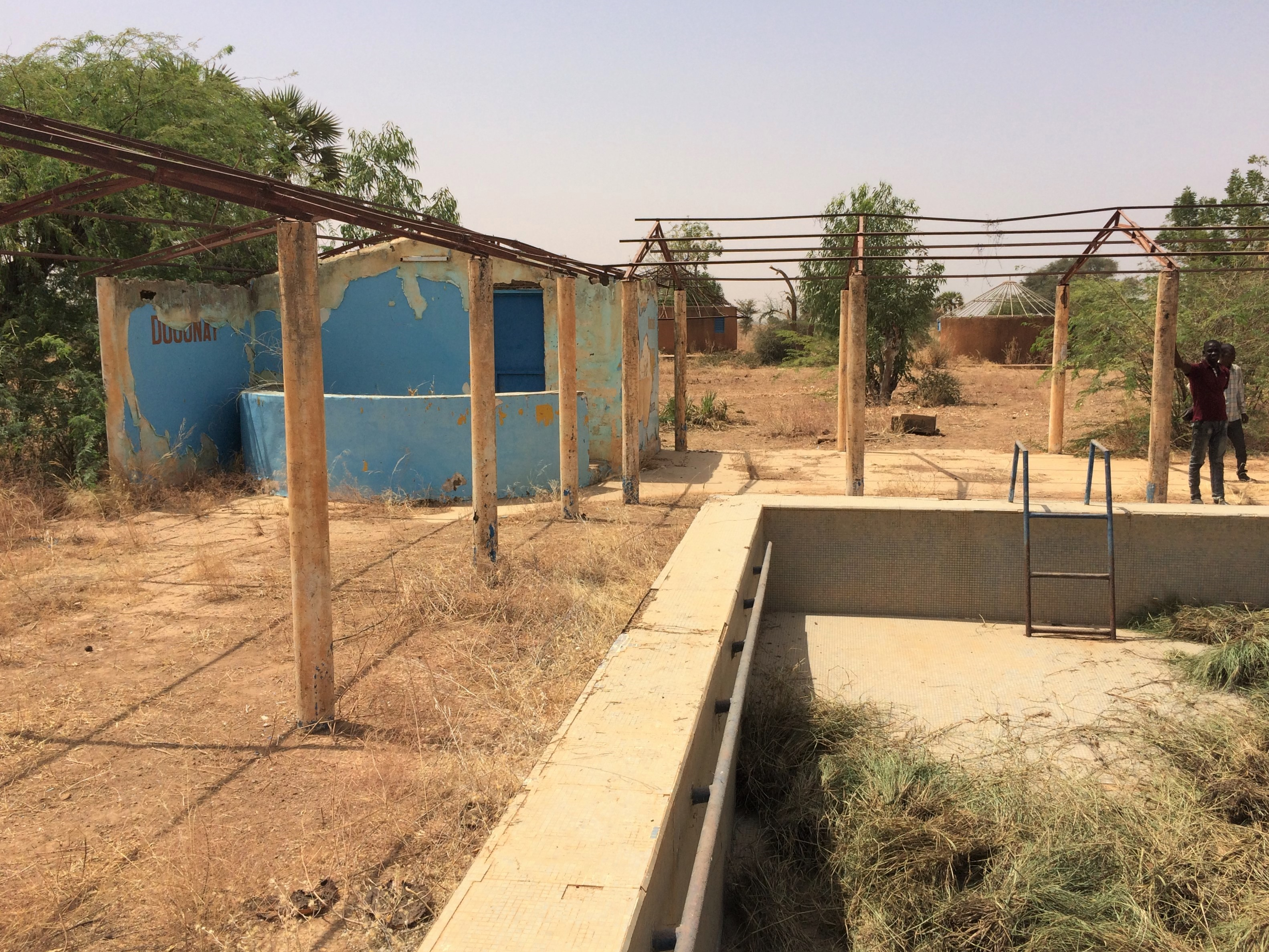
Abandoned campement-hotel

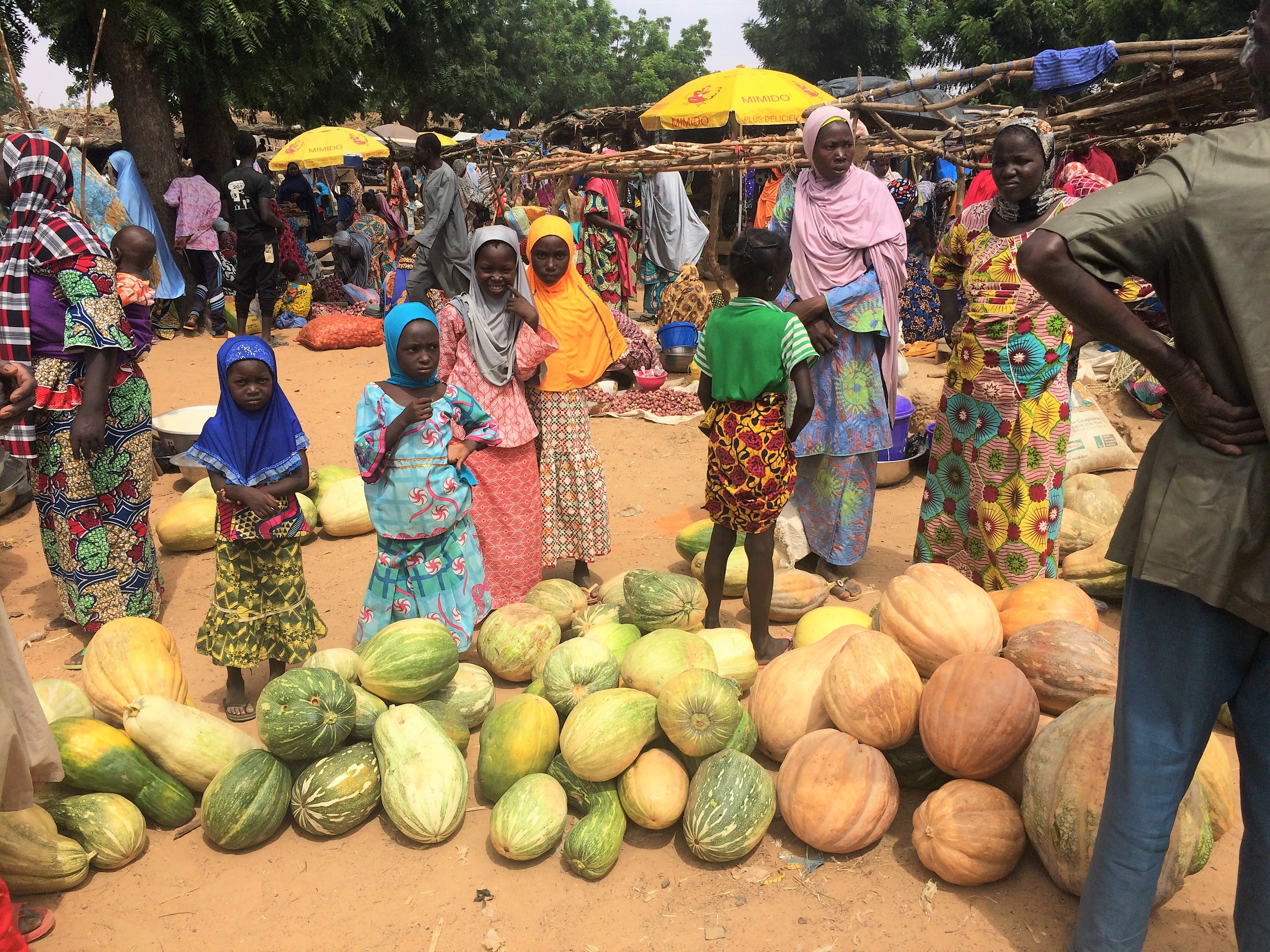
Girls and pumpkins on the weekly market

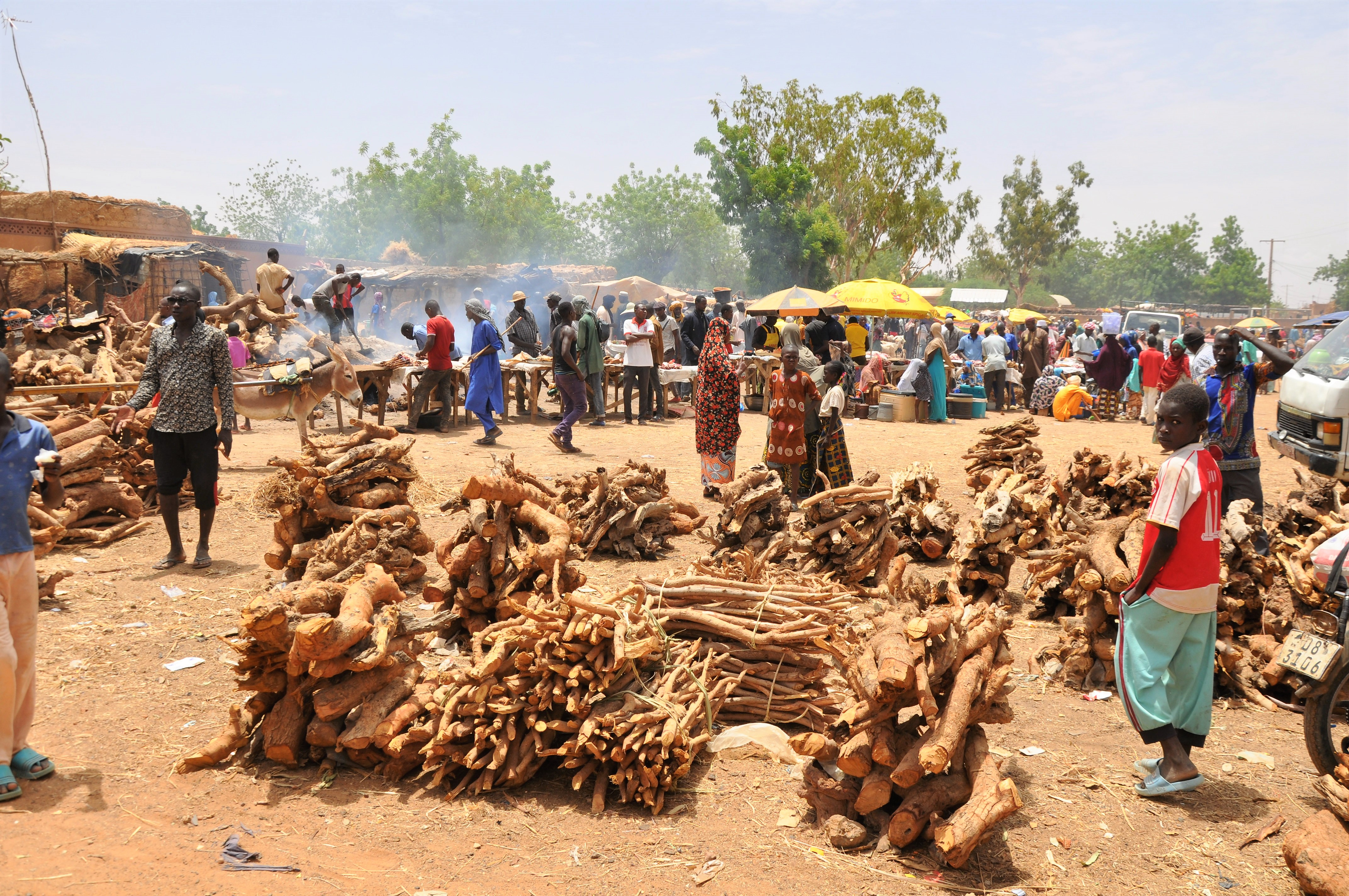
Sale of firewood

== Climate ==
Boubon has a hot semi-arid steppe climate, categorized as "BSh" according to the Köppen climate classification. The average annual temperature (day and night) is 29.3 °C; the average daily maximum temperatures in April and May are around 41 °C. Annual rainfall is around 450 mm; 92% of it falls between June and September. In the 6 months from November-April rainfall is close to 0.
