= Tillia massacres =

2021 terrorist incident in Niger

- Part of the jihadist insurgency in Niger
- Location: Intazayane, Bakorat, Wirsnat, Akofafof, Tillia, Tahoua Region, Niger
- Date: 21 March 2021
- Deaths: 141
- Injuries: Unknown
- Perpetrator: Islamic State in the Greater Sahara

On 21 March 2021, armed jihadists from the Islamic State in the Greater Sahara attacked the villages of Intazayane, Bakorat, Wirsnat, and several other hamlets and camps around Tillia, Tahoua Region, Niger. The attacks killed 141 people, mostly civilians, and injured several others.

== Background ==
In 2020, the French army launched a large offensive on the Islamic State in the Greater Sahara, which came at the same time as a large offensive by Jama'at Nasr al-Islam wal-Muslimin (JNIM) in the tri-border area between Mali, Niger, and Burkina Faso. The offensives inflicted heavy losses on ISGS, and the group seemed weakened. At the start of 2021 with the Tchoma Bangou and Zaroumdareye massacres, ISGS began killing civilians en masse in western Niger in several attacks, and also began attacking Mali and Burkina Faso.

However, according to the Armed Conflict Location & Event Data Project (ACLED), ISGS have changed its strategy toward more attacks on civilians in western Niger, particularly in the regions of Tahoua to reaffirm territorial control and punish communities suspected of collaborating with rival armed groups

On 15 March, a week before the massacres in Tillia, ISGS fighters killed 66 people in Darey-Daye and Chinagodrar, in the neighboring Tillabéri Region.

It was one of several large-scale assaults that targeted rural communities and pastoralist groups

== Attacks ==
The attacks began at around 12:00 p.m. GMT, when armed ISGS fighters rode up in the towns on motorcycles and shot indiscriminately at "anything that moved", according to an anonymous local elected official. The jihadists also torched camps in Akofafof that housed refugees, including women and children. The main victims of the massacres were Tuaregs.

While the attack was not claimed, the perpetrators are suspected to be the Islamic State in the Greater Sahara. France 24 journalist Wassim Nasr reiterated that ISGS conducted the attack, and stated that the massacres were reprisals for the civilians in those villages not paying zakat to ISGS.

Human Rights Watch also reported that many of the victims were targeted because they had refused to pay "zakat", confirming that the killings were both punitive and aimed at reasserting local control.

Nasr also stated that the villagers were more sympathetic to JNIM, and that there had been a spate of assassinations against pro-JNIM civilians in the area prior to the attack.

== Aftermath ==
The Nigerien government stated that 137 civilians were killed, making it the deadliest jihadist attack in Niger's history. This death toll rose to 141 by June 2022. At least 22 of the dead were children aged 5 to 17. Nigerien president Mohamed Bazoum announced three days of national mourning for the victims of the attack, and also vowed that the government would reinforce security in the region.

The attacks were condemned by the United States, African Union, the UN Secretary General António Guterres, Turkey, India, and Algeria. They were also condemned by the International Rescue Committee.

In May 2021, two months after the massacre, Human Rights Watch sent a public letter to President Mohamed Bazoum’s newly inaugurated government, urging it to prioritize justice and accountability for all war crimes committed by both armed groups and state security forces. The organization emphasized that addressing impunity was essential to breaking the cycle of violence in western Niger.

== Displacement and Women's Responses ==
Shortly after the massacre, many women and children survivors fled to nearby towns like Tillia, Tchintabaraden and Tahoua. Reports from humanitarian organizations local NGOs operating in the region said many families found refuge with host communities or in temporary camps. Women who had lost their husbands became the heads of households and began creating small support groups to share food, and organize mutual help.

Even though there is little formal documentation, humanitarian workers note how these networks played an important role in keeping social normality. In the camps, displaced women helped each other (with NGOs’s help) rebuild basic tents and houses and started activities like milk sales. These strategies are very common in other areas affected by the violent conflict in the Sahel. Women’s groups often try to replace an absent state by organizing to provide basic needs.

International Rescue Committee and UNICEF described these basic survival organizing efforts as important approach to resilience and nonviolent community recovery. By emphasizing cooperation over revenge, these women helped to prevent retaliatory violence and a constructive dialogue with other communities despite the trauma of the attacks. Analysts argue that these initiatives show how nonviolent organizing can emerge even in the middle of widespread insecurity, to help social reconstruction in Niger’s regions.
