= Intagamey attack =

2023 battle between Niger and Islamic State

- Part of Jihadist insurgency in Niger
Date	February 10, 2023
Location	near Intagamey, Ouallam Department, Niger
Result	ISGS victory

Belligerents
Niger	Islamic State in the Greater Sahara

Commanders and leaders
Unknown	"Hamakat"

Casualties and losses
17 killed 13 injured 12 missing 5 vehicles destroyed	Unknown

On February 10, 2023, militants from Islamic State in the Greater Sahara ambushed Nigerien soldiers at Intagamey, Niger, killing at least seventeen people.

== Background ==
French and Nigerien forces began conducting Operation Almahaou in early 2023 to counter the growing jihadist forces from Islamic State in the Greater Sahara (ISGS) and Jama'at Nasr al-Islam wal-Muslimin (JNIM) that are active in the tri-border area between Mali, Niger, and Burkina Faso. The operation was also part of a French propaganda effort to maintain its image of bolstering counter-terrorism efforts in the region, especially after the deployment of the Wagner Group to Mali following the 2021 Malian coup d'état and the regime of Ibrahim Traoré that took over Burkina Faso in September 2022 and was hostile to French forces. At the time of the attack, Niger was the only country in the tri-border region that allowed French troops to be involved in counter-terrorism efforts.

== Attack ==
The attack occurred near Intagamey, a village on the Malian border in the Ouallam Department of Niger. Jihadists attacked a convoy of Nigerien vehicles participating in Operation Almahaou, with a provisional death toll mentioning eleven soldiers killed, thirteen injured, and sixteen missing. French planes flew above the attack site shortly afterward, although by that point the jihadists had fled across the Malian border.

The Nigerien Ministry of Defense stated on February 17 that seventeen soldiers had been killed in the attack, thirteen were wounded, and twelve were missing. While the losses of the jihadists are unknown, the statement mentioned that five Nigerien vehicles were burned and the jihadists took away several bodies.

== Aftermath ==
In March 2023, a Nigerian counter-jihadist operation killed 79 fighters mainly from the Islamic State in the Greater Sahara. The operation saw Nigerien troops enter Malian territory to kill the jihadists including their leader Hamakat, who masterminded the Intagamey attack. No Nigerien casualties were reported in the counter-operation.

France, Algeria, and the OIC condemned the Intagamey attack.
