= March 2021 Darey-Daye massacre =

2021 massacre in Niger

- Part of Jihadist insurgency in Niger
- Location: Darey-Daye, Tillaberi Region, Niger
- Date: March 15, 2021
- Target: Zarma males
- Deaths: 66
- Perpetrator: Islamic State in the Greater Sahara

On March 15, 2021, jihadists from the Islamic State in the Greater Sahara attacked the village of Darey-Daye, Tillabéri Region, Niger, killing sixty-six civilians. The attack occurred two months after the Tchoma Bangou and Zaroumdareye massacres, the deadliest attacks on civilians by ISGS in Niger.

== Background ==
At the start of 2021, the Islamic State in the Greater Sahara, a predominantly Fulani organization based in the tri-border area between Mali, Niger, and Burkina Faso, began attacking civilian areas, especially with non-Fulani populations. The first major attack was the Tchoma Bangou and Zaroumdareye massacres that killed 105 people, and on the same day of the attack in Darey-Daye, ISGS fighters in Mali killed thirty-three Malian soldiers during the battle of Tessit.

== Massacre ==
At around 5 p.m. on March 15, 2021, armed men stopped four buses carrying civilians in the villages of Chinagodrar and Darey-Daye that were returning from the weekly market in Banibangou. The jihadists forced the passengers off, and separated them into groups by ethnicity and gender. All Zarma males were killed including one Hausa driver. Twenty-nine people were killed in this initial massacre, according to a survivor. The jihadists then raided the village of Darey-Daye, where they burned granaries and shot indiscriminately at civilians. These attacks on Darey-Daye killed 37 people.

The Nigerien government stated on March 16 that 58 people were killed and one was injured in the massacre. This toll was later raised to 66 civilians killed. While no group claimed responsibility, the Islamic State in the Greater Sahara had been accused of and claimed responsibility for various similar attacks in the surrounding area.

== Aftermath ==
A week after the attack, three villages in Tillia were attacked by ISGS, killing 137 people in the deadliest massacre in Nigerien history. On August 17, 2021, 37 people were killed in Darey-Daye in a second attack by ISGS.
