= Kollo Department =

Coordinates: 13°18′15″N 2°20′20″E

Kollo
- Department
- Département de Kollo
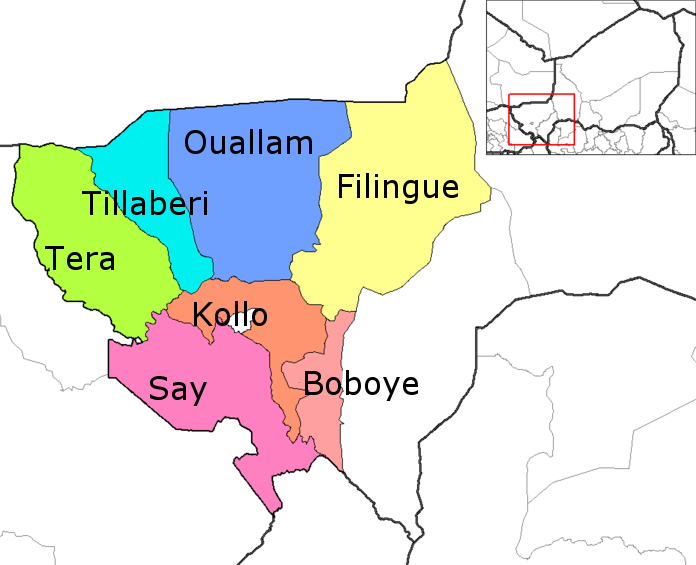
- Kollo Department location in the region
- Country: Niger
- Region: Tillabéri Region
- Departmental: Kollo

Area
  - Total: 10,002 km^{2} (3,862 sq mi)

Population (2012 census)
  - Total: 465,399
  - Density: 46.531/km^{2} (120.51/sq mi)
- Time zone: UTC+1 (GMT 1)

Kollo is a department of the Tillabéri Region in Niger. Its capital lies at the city of Kollo, and includes the towns of N'Dounga, Fakara, Hamdallaye, Karma, Kirtachi, Kouré, Lamordé, Liboré, and Namaro. As of 2012, the department had a total population of 465,399 people.

== Communes ==
- Bitinkodji
- Diantchandou
- Hamdallaye
- Karma
- Kirtachi
- Kollo
- Kouré
- Libore
- Namaro
- N'Dounga
- Youri
