= 2016 Bani Bangou attack =

2016 battle

- Part of Jihadist insurgency in Niger
Date	November 8, 2016
Location	Bani-Bangou, Tillaberi Region, Niger
Result	ISGS victory

Belligerents
Niger	Islamic State in the Greater Sahara

Commanders and leaders
Unknown	Aboubacar Chapori

Strength
17	20–30 men 2 pickups 10 motorcycles

Casualties and losses
5 killed 3 injured 2 hostages	2 killed

On November 8, 2016, Islamic State in the Greater Sahara (ISGS) fighters attacked Nigerien forces in Bani-Bangou, Tillabéri Region, Niger.

== Background ==
The Islamic State in the Greater Sahara (ISGS) was formed by Adnan Abu Walid al-Sahrawi, a former commander in Malian jihadist group MOJWA, after Sahrawi pledged bay'ah to Islamic State caliph Abu Bakr al-Baghdadi in 2015. al-Baghdadi recognized Sahrawi's group as the ISGS in October 2016, and the ISGS began its first attacks in Markoye, Burkina Faso and Koutoukole, Niger that same month. A little over a month prior to the attack, 22 Nigerien soldiers were killed by unknown jihadists in Tazalit, Niger.

== Attack ==
Armed men attacked a Nigerien military outpost in Bani Bangou at around 5 a.m. on November 8, 2016. Seventeen soldiers were present at the time of the attack. The attackers arrived on ten motorcycles and two vehicles, and were led by ISGS commander Aboubacar Chapori, a close confidant of Sahrawi. Fighting between the attackers and the Nigerien forces lasted for around an hour. French planes from Operation Barkhane flew over the battle in a show of force, causing the jihadists to flee. The jihadists abandoned the Bani Bangou post with two machine-gun equipped vehicles, and headed towards Mali.

The ISGS did not claim responsibility for the attack, but French and Malian officials reported that ISGS and MOJWA militants were responsible. The Nigerien Ministry of the Interior reported that five Nigerien soldiers were killed, three were wounded, and four were taken hostage. Abdoul Wahid, who was taken hostage in the attack, stated that two soldiers were actually taken hostage, and the other was executed. Two of the jihadists were killed in the battle and 26 were arrested afterward. Wahid stated that the goal of the attackers was not jihad, but instead the killing of foreign soldiers.
