= Kollo, Niger =

Commune in Tillabéri, Niger

Coordinates: 13°01′00″N 01°53′00″E

Kollo
- Commune and town
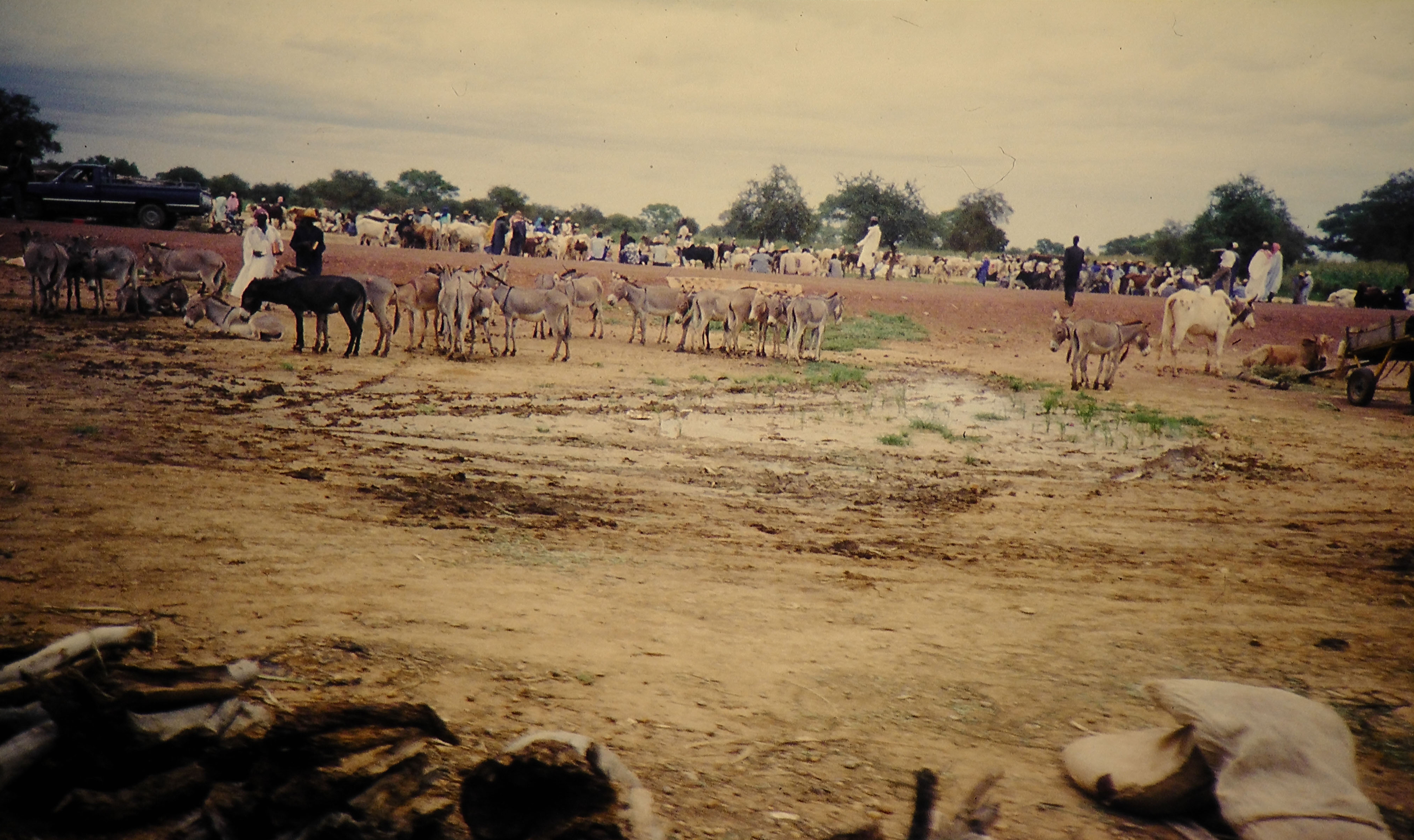
- Market in Seberi village, Kollo, Niger.
- Interactive map of Kollo
- Country: Niger
- Region: Tillabéri
- Department: Kollo
- Elevation: 720 ft (220 m)

Population (2012 census)
  - Total: 32,829
- Time zone: UTC+01:00 (WAT)

Kollo is a large town and urban commune in southwestern Niger, where NGOs work, as well as, missionaries and Peace Corps volunteers. It lies in the Kollo Department of the Tillabéri Region. As of 2012, it had a population of 32,829.

== Transport ==
Currently, Kollo can be accessed by its main road. There are bush taxis available as well as urban buses from Niamey. City taxies generally do not go to Kollo. They will stop in Libore unless you pay a little more. It is proposed to be served by a station on a future railway network.

== Sister city ==
- Enid, Oklahoma, United States, was declared as Kollo's sister city on August 1, 2010.

== See also ==
- Railway stations in Niger
