= Tchoma Bangou and Zaroumdareye massacres =

2021 mass murder in Niger

- Part of Jihadist insurgency in Niger
- Location: Tchoma Bangou and Zaroumdareye, Tondikiwindi, Ouallam Department, Tillaberi Region, Niger
- Date: January 2, 2021; 11am
- Deaths: 105: 76 in Tchoma Bangou; ~30 in Zaroumdareye
- Injuries: 75
- Perpetrator: Islamic State in the Greater Sahara
- No. of participants: 100 motorcycles
- Motive: Reprisal for lynching of two ISGS tax collectors

The Tchoma Bangou and Zaroumdareye massacres took place on January 2, 2021, when 105 people were killed and 75 injured in attacks by Islamic State in the Greater Sahara on the villages of Tchoma Bangou and Zaroumdareye in Tondikiwindi, Ouallam Department, Niger. The massacres were one of the deadliest events in Nigerien history.

== Background ==
The Islamic State in the Greater Sahara (ISGS) is active in the Tillaberi region of western Niger, where Tchoma Bangou and Zaroumdareye are located. To prevent attacks on civilians and Nigerien forces by jihadists, Nigerien officials banned travelling by motorbike, a common tactic of jihadists, throughout Tillaberi in January 2020. However, attacks still occurred in Tillaberi, with seven Nigerien soldiers killed in an ambush in the region on December 21 and 34 civilians killed in massacres by jihadists in Toumour.

Former Nigerien minister and Tillaberi native Issoufou Issaka stated that the massacres in Tchoma Bangou and Zaroumdareye were reprisal attacks for the lynching of two jihadists that had come to collect taxes in the villages by residents on December 15, 2020. In response to the killings, ISGS declared the villages "enemy settlements", abducting and killing the chief of Tchoumbangou. The inhabitants of Tchoma Bangou and Zaroumdareye are also predominantly Zarma, who are engaged in a war with the Fulani, who predominantly make up ISGS.

== Massacres ==
The massacres began at around 11am local time, when results from the first round of the 2020–21 Nigerien general election were being announced. The perpetrators had likely crossed the border from Mali to reach the villages, splitting into columns on around 100 motorcycles to attack them. A survivor of the massacres stated that as soon as the ISGS fighters invaded the village, residents rushed inside their homes and only heard the sound of the motorbikes. The jihadists targeted and burned granaries in the town as well, forcing residents who didn't leave after the attack to be unable to stay in the village long afterward.

76 people were killed in Tchoma Bangou and at least 30 were killed in Zaroumdareye, including 17 children. 75 people were wounded as well, with 26 being aided by the International Committee of the Red Cross and others being sent to hospitals in Niamey and Ouallam. Nigerien soldiers and FDS arrived in the villages after the jihadists and survivors had left.

== Aftermath ==
Nigerien Prime Minister Brigi Rafini led a delegation to the villages the weekend after the massacres occurred. Around that same time, Nigerien president Mahamadou Issoufou stated he would hold a security council for the massacres, and announced three days of mourning across the country. Mohamed Bazoum, the winner of the first round of the presidential elections, condemned the massacres and promised to fight against ISGS. French officials condemned the massacres.

After the massacres in Tchoma Bangou and Zaroumdareye, an anonymous message was shared around Zarma online groups blamed Fulani for the attacks and vowed revenge. ISGS claimed the attack was revenge for the proliferation of pro-government self-defense militias in the region.

Tchoma Bangou was attacked again on July 21, 2021, but this attack was repelled by Nigerien soldiers in the village. Five civilians, four soldiers, and 40 ISGS fighters were killed.
