= Second Battle of Tongo-Tongo =

Battle

- Part of Operation Barkhane
Date	December 27-28, 2018
Location	Tongo-Tongo, Niger 15°04′N 1°50′E
Result	Franco-Nigerien victory

Belligerents
France; Niger	Islamic State in the Greater Sahara

Strength
Unknown	Unknown

Casualties and losses
None	Around 15 killed

The Second Battle of Tongo-Tongo took place on December 27 and 28, 2018 during the Sahel War.

== Battle ==
On December 27 and 28, 2018, the Nigerien army and French troops from the Barkhane force carried out an operation in the Tongo-Tongo region, near the border with Mali, where a year earlier around ten Nigerien soldiers and Americans had been killed in an Islamic State In the Greater Sahara ambush. The attack began on the night of the 27th to the 28th with a combined raid of Mirage and Attack helicopters, with the support of a Reaper drone and a C135 tanker plane, in an area within a radius of action of fifteen kilometers . The strikes then target jihadists probably belonging to the Islamic State in the Great Sahara according to the French army . Nigerien soldiers and French soldiers from the mountain commandos and parachute commandos then lead the ground attack supported by helicopters and seize different positions. The area is then searched for 48 hours.

== Casualties ==
According to the French army, around fifteen jihadists were killed in the operation. About twenty motorcycles were recovered, as were 26 weapons, including machine guns, as well as ammunition. The French and Nigerien troops did not suffer any losses.
