= Dingazi =

Coordinates: 14°10′48″N 2°33′14″E

- Commune and village
- Interactive map of Dingazi
- Country: Niger

Area
  - Total: 1,270 sq mi (3,289 km^{2})

Population (2012 census)
  - Total: 44,486
  - Density: 35.03/sq mi (13.53/km^{2})
- Time zone: UTC+1 (WAT)

Dingazi is a village and rural commune in Niger. As of 2012, it had a population of 44,486.
