= Tiloa =

Coordinates: 15°3′55.1″N 2°3′40.7″E

15°3'55.1"N, 2°3'40.7"E Tiloa is a town in Niger. On February 23, 2015, 15 soldiers of the Niger Armed Forces were killed outside the town by terrorists.
