= Bitinkodji =

Coordinates: 13°35′02″N 1°57′34″E

- Commune and village
- Interactive map of Bitinkodji
- Country: Niger
- Region: Tillabéri Region

Area
  - Total: 271.3 sq mi (702.7 km^{2})
- Elevation: 636 ft (194 m)

Population (2012 census)
  - Total: 29,067
  - Density: 107.1/sq mi (41.36/km^{2})
- Time zone: UTC+1 (WAT)

Bitinkodji is a village and rural commune in Niger. As of 2012, it had a population of 29,067.
