= Bani-Bangou =

Bani-Bangou Banibanagan
- Location within Niger
- Coordinates: 15°2′27″N 2°42′18″E
- Country: Niger
- Region: Tillabéri Region
- Department: Ouallam
- Commune Rurale: Banibangou Commune
  - Summer (DST): UTC+1

Bani-Bangou (var. Banibanagan) is a town in southwestern Niger, in rural northern Ouallam Department, Tillabéri Region. It is the capital of the rural commune of Banibangou. On the main highway from Ouallam on the route to the Malian border town of Andéramboukane. It is 135 km northeast of Ouallam and 70 km by road from Mali. It around 200 km cross country from Niamey. The town is the seat of a "Rural Commune" of the same name, one of four rural communes in the department. Nearby villages include Gorou, Bassikwana, and Tondi Tiyaro Kwara to the north; Koloukta and Dinara along the highway west; Ouyé to the southeast.

Bani-Bangou commune lies in the historical region of the Zarmaganda plateau, one of the traditional homes of the Djerma people. The population remains largely Djerma with semi-nomadic Kel Dinnik Tuareg communities.

A poor area on the edge of the Sahara desert, Bani-Bangou was hard hit by rural famine during the 2005–06 Niger food crisis. Land use mapping from 2006 showed the town itself, built along a dry wadi running south to the Niger river, to be on the transition line between sahel grasslands to the south and west, and desert to the north and east.

== Recent conflict ==
On 16 March 2008 Bani Bangou's military post was the site of a rebel attack in the Tuareg Rebellion. It was the closest attack by northern Tuareg MNJ rebels had made to the capital Niamey. Three Nigerien Armed Forces soldier were killed and one prisoner was seized. The area has also been the target of multiple attacks during the Jihadist insurgency in Niger.

=== 2009 kidnapping ===
On 22 January, four foreign tourists were reported kidnapped in Mali, north of Bani-Bangou, while travelling by auto from a festival at Anderamboukané to the Malian town of Ménaka, and on to Gao. One Briton, one German, and two Swiss citizens were reportedly kidnapped. One of their vehicles escaped the attack, and one which was seized was later found abandoned across the border near Bani-Bangou.

=== 2025 Attack ===
On 19 June 2025, Islamic State Sahel Province militants launched an attack on the town. According to the Nigerien Ministry of Defense, several hundred militants on around 200 motorcycles staged an attack across the Malian border; with 71 Nigerien soldiers being killed and 14 injured, while dozens of Jihadists were killed.
