= Libore =

Coordinates: 13°24′12″N 2°11′31″E

Liboré
- Commune and village
- Interactive map of Liboré
- Niger: Niger
- Region: Tillabéri
- Department: Kollo

Area
  - Total: 62.3 sq mi (161.3 km^{2})

Population (2012 census)
  - Total: 26,243
  - Density: 421.4/sq mi (162.7/km^{2})
- Time zone: UTC+1 (WAT)

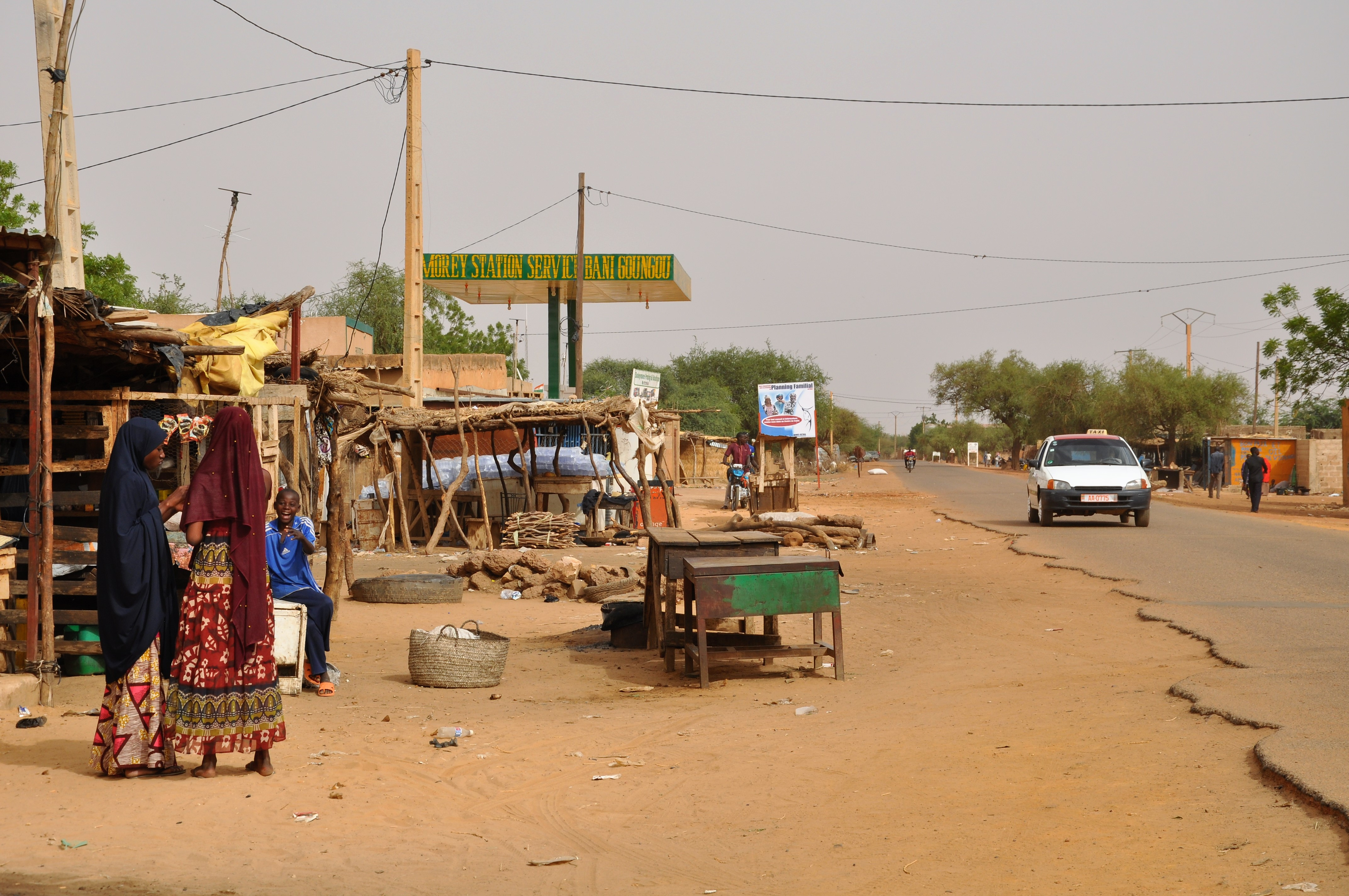
Scene in Bani Goungou, one of the villages in the Liboré commune.

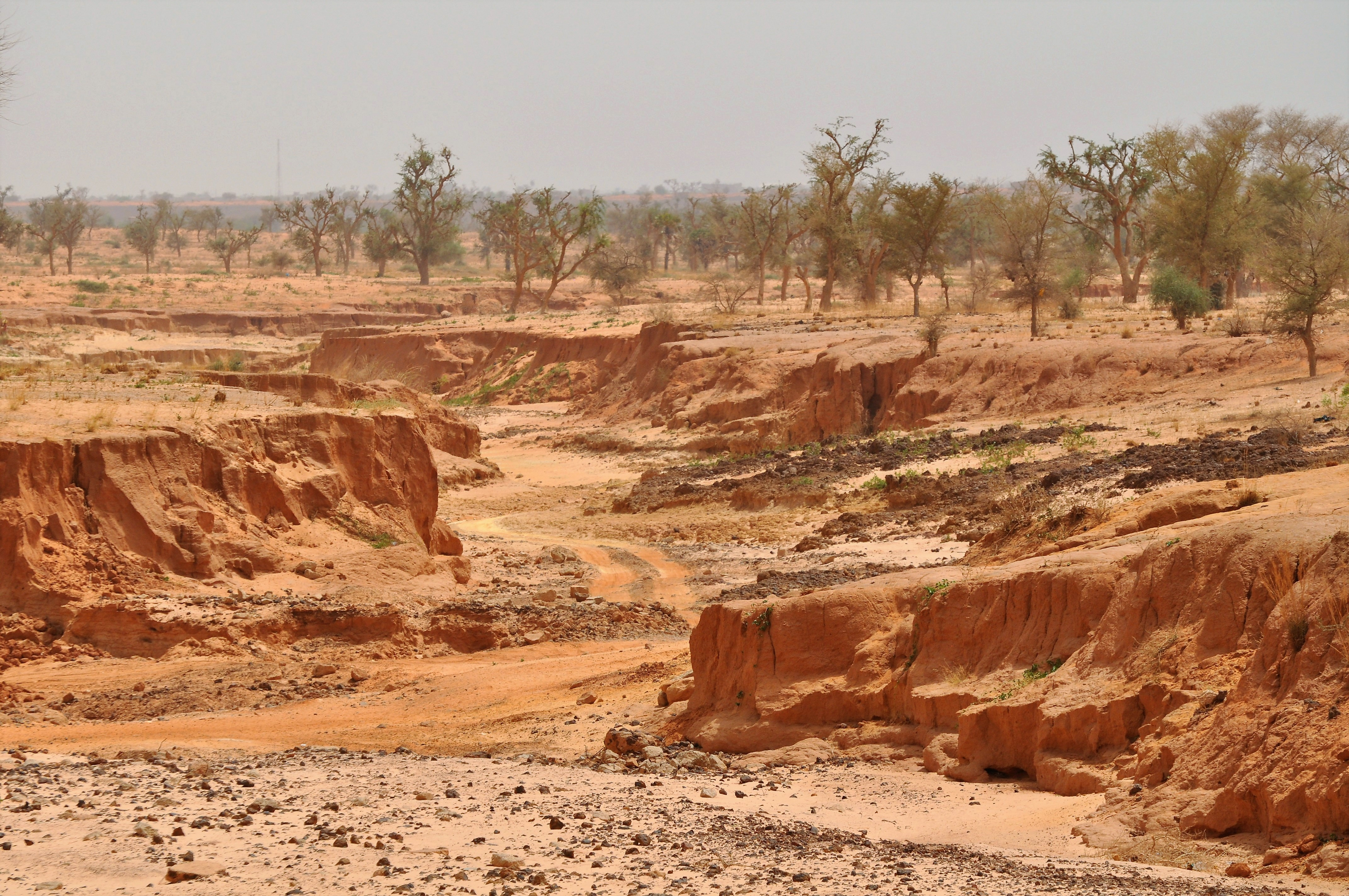
A dry river bed in the commune, near Kogorou.

Liboré is a rural commune (municipality) in the Kollo Department, Tillabéri Region, in Niger. As of 2012, it had a population of 26,243.

Located along the left bank of the Niger river 20 kilometers to the southeast of the capital, Niamey, its economy is based predominantly on the subsistence cultivation of irrigated rice and rainfed millet. Other crops include hot pepper, okra, tomato, and lettuce, while several species of mango are grown and marketed. Villages are predominantly of the Zarma or Djerma ethnicity though Fula (French: Peul; Fula: Fulɓe) villages are scattered throughout. While the Zarmas are primarily agriculturalists and Fulas mainly herders, both groups dabble in each other's traditional livelihoods.

Liboré has 36 primary schools and 2 high schools. Because of its proximity to the capital, the commune experiences a higher rate of non-agricultural employment than the Nigerien average. The weekly market takes place on Mondays in the village of Tiandifarou. The commune's community NGO, ONG LIBO, directed by Hamani Djibo, is involved in education, health services, and commercial development.

The commune of Liboré comprises some 22 villages, hamlets and neighborhoods: Bani Goungou, Boulfonda, Garbal, Gonzari Beri, Gonzari Kaina, Gorou Beri, Koara Koukou, Kogorou, Koroze, Liboré Bongou Banda, Liboré Peulh, Liboré Tonko Bangou, Liboré Zarma, Mallaley (Liboré Mallaley), Sekire Peulh, Sekire Zarma, Sorey Ganga, Sorey Sekou Kouara (Sorey Bene), Tawre, Tiandifarou, Tilbi and Yaboni.
