= N'Dounga =

Coordinates: 13°21′00″N 2°14′56″E

- Commune and village
- Interactive map of N'Dounga
- Country: Niger
- Region: Tillabéri
- Department: Kollo

Area
  - Total: 105.6 sq mi (273.4 km^{2})

Population (2012 census)
  - Total: 22,341
  - Density: 211.6/sq mi (81.72/km^{2})
- Time zone: UTC+1 (WAT)

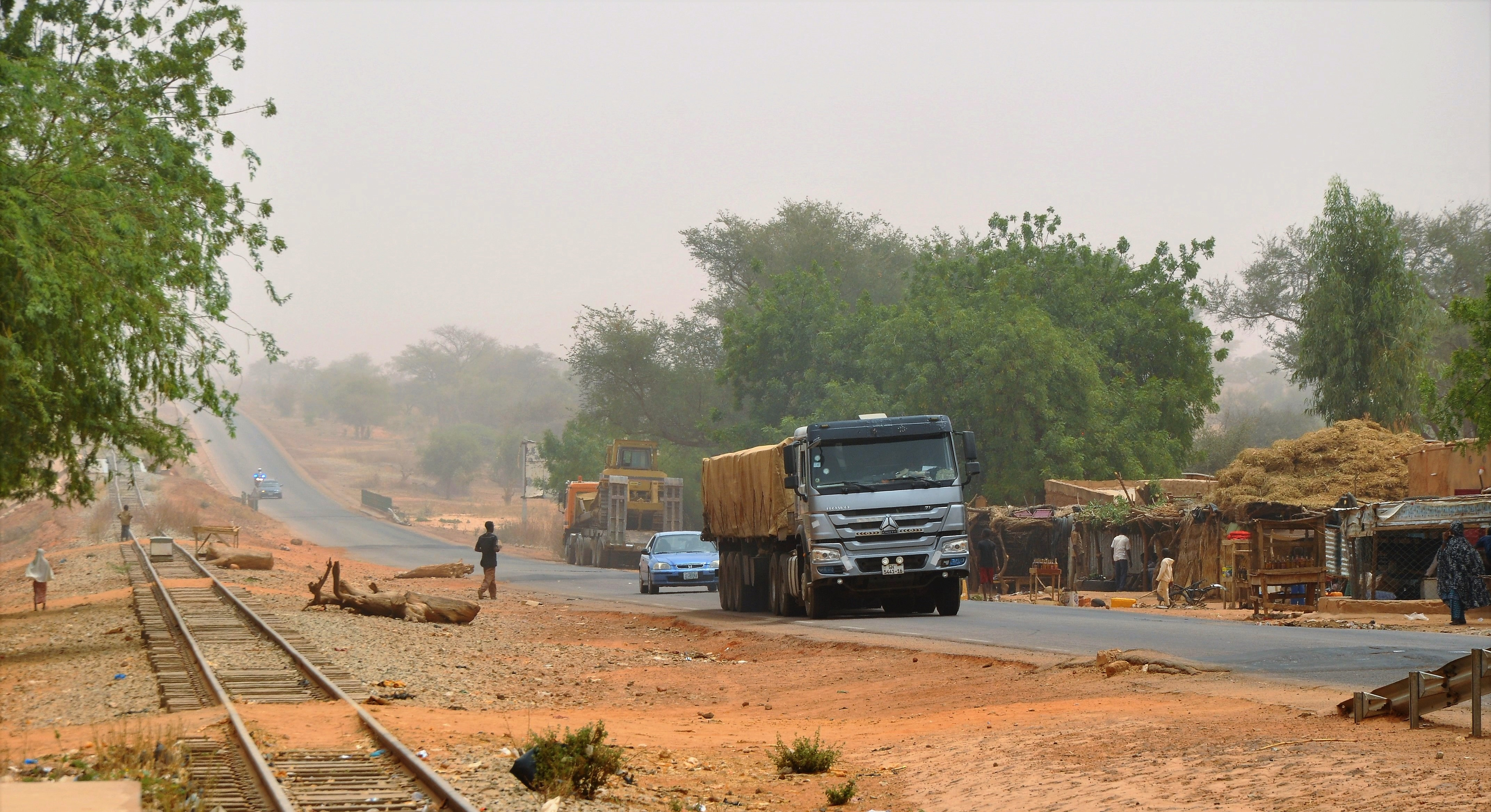
The Niamey-Dosso railway and Route Nationale No. 1 passing through Guesselbodi, a village some 25 km southeast of Niamey along the main road to Dosso, in Niger (N'Dounga commune, Kollo Department, Tillabéry Region).

N'Dounga is a village and rural commune in Niger. As of 2012, it had a population of 22,341.
