= Diantchandou =

Coordinates: 13°24′42″N 2°45′27″E

- Commune and village
- Interactive map of Diantchandou
- Country: Niger
- Region: Tillabéri Region

Area
  - Total: 383.4 sq mi (993.0 km^{2})

Population (2012 census)
  - Total: 37,059
  - Density: 96.66/sq mi (37.32/km^{2})
- Time zone: UTC+1 (WAT)

Diantchandou is a village and rural commune in Niger. As of 2012, it had a population of 37,059.
