= Simiri =

- Commune and village
- Location in Niger
- Coordinates: 14°08′N 2°08′E
- Country: Niger
- Region: Tillabéri
- Department: Ouallam

Area
  - Total: 961 sq mi (2,488 km^{2})

Population (2012 census)
  - Total: 103,057
  - Density: 107.3/sq mi (41.42/km^{2})
- Time zone: UTC+1 (WAT)

Simiri is a village in the Ouallam Department of the Tillabéri Region in southwestern Niger. As of 2012, it had a population of 103,057.
