= Tazalit attack =

2016 battle in Niger

- Part of Jihadist insurgency in Niger
- Location: Tazalit refugee camp, Tahoua Region, Niger
- Date: October 6, 2016; 2:22 pm
- Target: Nigerien Armed Forces
- Deaths: 22 Nigerien soldiers killed
- Injuries: 6 injured: 5 soldiers injured; 1 civilian
- Perpetrator: Unknown jihadists

The Tazalit attack, also known as the Tazalit massacre, occurred on October 6, 2016, when unknown jihadists attacked Nigerien forces at the Tazalit refugee camp in Niger, killing dozens of Nigerien soldiers. The attack was the deadliest attack on Nigerien forces so far during the jihadist insurgency in Niger.

== Background ==
Jihadist groups from Mali have travelled through Niger and conducted attacks on Nigerien forces sporadically in the early and mid-2010s. These attacks mainly took place in Tahoua Region, on the Nigerien-Malian border, and took place when jihadists trafficked arms from Libya. Two main groups in the area that have attacked Nigerien forces in the past are Al-Qaeda in the Islamic Maghreb led by Abdelmalek Droukdel and Mokhtar Belmokhtar and elements of Al-Mourabitoun and MOJWA led by Adnan Abu Walid al-Sahrawi (the future founder of Islamic State in the Greater Sahara). Sahrawi's forces and AQIM have been in open conflict since 2015, and Islamic State caliph Abu Bakr al-Baghdadi recognized the creation of ISGS in October 2016.

At the time of the attack, the Tazalit refugee camp hosted 4,000 Malian refugees. Another area in Tahoua region had come under attack by unknown jihadists earlier that month, with no reaction from the Nigerien government.

== Attack ==
The perpetrators of the attack came from Mali, with 30 to 40 men arriving on board four vehicles and a motorcycle. The attackers arrived at the Tazalit camp at 2:22pm at October 6, and took place very rapidly. The jihadists drove their pickups directly into the camp's security post, machine-gunning the soldiers who had gathered for lunch. The soldiers were taken completely by surprise and were unable to fight back. Nigerien soldiers who survived the initial attack were finished off with a bullet to the head.

The attackers remained in control of the Tazalit camp for two hours. Civilians were not targeted in the attack, but the jihadists looted food stores, pharmacies, armories, and set fire to an ambulance before leaving. The jihadists took a Nigerien army vehicle, a UNHCR vehicle, and an ambulance with them when they fled. They fled northwest towards the Malian border.

== Aftermath ==
=== Perpetrator ===
Both AQIM and the newly-formed ISGS were suspected of the attack. Survivors of the attack stated that the perpetrators were Tuaregs. On October 7, the Nigerien Minister of Defense claimed that the High Council for the Unity of Azawad (HCUA) had participated in the attack. He attributed the attack to "narco-terrorist groups", and said that Nigerien authorities didn't distinguish between AQIM, Ansar Dine, and the HCUA. The Coordination of Azawad Movements, a coalition that includes the HCUA, denied the allegations. Investigations by Nigerien authorities pointed to Malian armed groups' involvement. A few weeks after the attack, local sources reported that armed groups based in Kidal Region, notably GATIA, had some of their militants attack the Tazalit camp. The perpetrators of the attack had a base in Ilamawan, near Midal, Tahoua Region.

=== Casualties ===
Nigerien Prime Minister Brigi Rafini, Nigerien security officials, and UNHCR all stated that 22 Nigerien soldiers were killed in the Tazalit attack. Of the 22, 14 were national guardsmen, five were gendarmes, and three were soldiers. Five soldiers were injured, and only two or three soldiers managed to escape. One civilian was injured in the attack. The Tazalit attack was the deadliest attack by jihadists during the jihadist insurgency in Niger up to that point. A two-day national mourning was declared by Nigerien president Mahamadou Issoufou on October 7.

=== Reactions and aftermath of Tazalit ===
The United Nations and African Union condemned the attacks. In November 2016, the Nigerien government dismantled the Tazalit refugee camp in accordance with UNHCR. All 4,000 refugees at Tazalit were moved to the Intikane refugee camp, where 18,000 refugees were already living. The majority of refugees moved to Intikane beginning on January 21, 2017, and ending on January 31, although those that stayed behind would no longer receive aid from UNHCR outside of identification cards and forming self-defense groups.
