= Banibangou =

Coordinates: 15°02′30″N 2°42′13″E

- Commune
- Interactive map of Banibangou
- Country: Niger
- Region: Tillabéri
- Department: Ouallam

Area
  - Total: 2,490 sq mi (6,449 km^{2})
- Elevation: 774 ft (236 m)

Population (2012 census)
  - Total: 66,949
  - Density: 26.89/sq mi (10.38/km^{2})
- Time zone: UTC+1 (WAT)

Banibangou is rural commune in Niger. Its capital is Banibangou. It was the site of attacks on Fula pastoralists by Zarma people in December 2008, resulting in the rustling of over 20,000 cattle and the deaths of approximately 235 Fulas.
