= Ouallam =

Coordinates: 14.317615°N 2.098389°E

- Commune
- Interactive map of Ouallam
- Country: Niger
- Region: Tillabéri Region
- Department: Ouallam

Area
  - Commune: 648 sq mi (1,679 km^{2})

Population (2012 census)
  - Commune: 68,191
  - Density: 105.2/sq mi (40.61/km^{2})
  - Urban: 10,594
- Time zone: UTC+1 (WAT)

Ouallam is a town around 90 km north of Niamey in southwestern Niger. It is the capital of Ouallam Department, one of four departments in the Tillabéri Region.

In 2013 it had a population of 68,191.

== Culture ==
Historically centered in the lands of the Djerma people, Ouallam has important minorities of rural and urban Tuareg and Fula peoples. It is the main town of the rocky Sahel highlands called the Zarmaganda plateau, and is one of the traditional homes of the Djerma people and one of the places in which they coalesced as an ethnicity in the 15th and 16th centuries. The area had been along an important trade route to the Aïr Mountains, used by the Songhay Empire, and was later controlled by a series of Tuareg confederations.

== Agricultural center ==
Ouallam, on a main road to Niamey, is situated in an agricultural region which, although drier than areas further south and west, is a center for livestock (cattle—both sedentary and semi-nomadic, goats), as well as grain agriculture (millet and sorghum). A market center, the town is also home to an agricultural research center of the INRAN (Institut National de Recherches Agronomiques du Niger—the National Institute of Agricultural Research, Niger.)

== Intercommunal violence ==
In late 2008, the nearby village of Siwili was the scene of intercommunal violence, purportedly over accusations of theft of domestic animals.
