= Islamist insurgency in Niger =

Civil conflict in Niger

- Part of the War in the Sahel, spillover of the Mali War, Boko Haram insurgency, War against the Islamic State and the war on terror
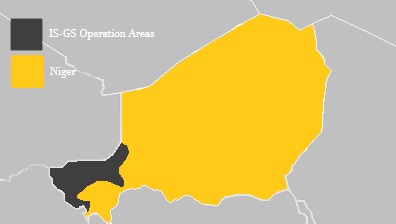
- The activity area of the IS-GS in Niger on 2021.
Date	6 February 2015 – present (11 years, 8 months, 3 weeks and 4 days)
Location	Niger
Status	Ongoing

Belligerents
Alliance of Sahel States; Niger; Mali; Burkina Faso; Russia; Algeria (since 2026); Training: EU (EUCAP Sahel Niger; 2012–24); Canada (Operation Naberius; 2013–24); Belgium; Germany (2015–24); China (since 2024); Italy; Turkey	Islamic State; (Islamic State) IS-GS (Western Niger); (Islamic State) ISWAP (Southeastern Niger); (Islamic State) Lakurawa (Western Niger)	Al-Qaeda; JNIM (Western Niger); Boko Haram (Southeastern Niger)

Commanders and leaders
Abdourahamane Tiani (2023–present) (Niger) Mohamed Bazoum (2021–2023) (Niger) Mahamadou Issoufou (2016–2021); Abdou Sidikou Issa (2023–present); Salifou Modi (2020–2023)	(Islamic State) Adnan Abu Walid al-Sahrawi † (Islamic State) Abdulaziz Mahwaz Al-Jamal (Islamic State) Soumana Boura † (Islamic State) Abu al-Bara al-Sahrawi	Iyad Ag Ghaly; Sedane Ag Hita Abubakar Shekau ‡‡ Abu Umaimata; Ibrahim Mahamadu †

Units involved
Niger Armed Forces	Military of the Islamic State	Unknown Bakura's group

Casualties and losses
- 7,000+ deaths, c. 30,000 internally displaced

Since 2015, the border area between Burkina Faso, Mali, and Niger has been a hotbed for jihadist forces originating from Mali. The insurgency has taken place in two distinct regions of Niger. In the southwest, the Islamic State in the Greater Sahara and the Nusrat al-Islam have carried out attacks in the tri-border area with Burkina Faso and Mali. Meanwhile, in the southeast, the Islamic State in the West African Province has established control in parts of southern Niger.

Weak governance in the Sahel has been attributed to the expansion of violent extremism in the region. The region's stability has been significantly impacted by frequent transfers of power, exemplified by Niger experiencing a failed attempted coup in 2021 and a successful coup in 2023.

== Background ==
Several major attacks occurred in Niger between the 2010s and 2020s.

Niger faces jihadist insurgencies both in its western regions (as a result of the spillover of the Mali War) and in its southeastern region (as a result of the spillover of the Boko Haram insurgency). The insurgency in the west of the country began with incursions in 2015 and intensified from 2017 onwards, with massacres carried out by groups affiliated with al-Qaeda and the so-called Islamic State. In its southeastern regions, nevertheless, Niger mainly fights Boko Haram insurgents.

== Timeline ==
=== 2015 ===
- February 9 - Boko Haram launch a raid on a prison in the town of Diffa in Niger. Authorities repel the attack.
- February 17 - A warplane bombs a funeral ceremony in Niger killing 30 civilians.

=== 2016 ===
- November 8 - Islamic State in the Greater Sahara (ISGS) fighters attacked the Nigerien forces in Bani-Bangou, Tillabéri Region, Niger. In total 7 people, 5 Nigerien soldiers and 2 terrorists, were killed and two other soldiers captured by the islamists.
- October 6 - In Tazalit an unknown jihadist group attacked the Nigerien Armed Forces, killing 22 soldiers.

=== 2017 ===
- February 22 - In Tilwa ISGS attacked the army, killing 16 soldiers, destroying 4 pickups and capturing 7 others.
- March 6 - Between Wanzarbé and Yakatala ISGS attacked the army, killing 5-7 soldiers and destroying their vehicle.
- October 4 - Tongo Tongo ambush
- October 21 - 2017 Ayorou attack

=== 2018 ===
- 27-28 December - Second Battle of Tongo-Tongo

=== 2019 ===
On 10 December 2019, a large group of fighters belonging to the IS-GS attacked a military post in Inates, Niger, killing over seventy soldiers and kidnapping others. The attack was the deadliest single incident Niger's military has ever experienced.

=== 2020 ===
On 9 January 2020, a large group of IS-GS militants assaulted a Nigerien military base at Chinagodrar, in Niger's Tillabéri Region. At least 89 Nigerien soldiers were confirmed to have been killed in the attack, with more casualties suspected, making it the worst attack on the army since the start of the insurgency.

=== 2021 ===
It is also the first year in which attacks were carried out with frequency in the country. Attacks were carried out every month of 2021. The previous biggest attack in Niger against civilians was the 12 December 2020 Toumour attack, which resulted in 28 people killed. Both the December 2020 and January 2021 attacks were carried out during Niger's municipal and regional elections, while the February bombing specifically targeted members of the electoral commission.

==== January ====
On 2 January, the villages of Tchombangou (at 14°49′48″N 01°48′45″E) and Zaroumdareye (at 14°54′21″N 01°46′36″E), which are seven kilometers apart, were attacked by several militants. The attack initially left 79 people dead and 75 wounded. Of the deceased victims, 49 were killed in Tchombangou and 30 in Zaroumdareye. A day after the attack, 21 more people were found dead and others succumbed to their injuries on Tchombangou, bringing the total death toll to 100. On 8 January, UN's High Commissioner for Refugees spokesman said that 73 people had been killed in the village of Tchouma Bangou and 32 in Zaroumdareye, making the total death toll 105. The government of Niger dispatched soldiers to the border after the attacks. The attackers are Islamist militants who arrived in the villages while crossing the border from Mali.

Sometime before the massacre, two Islamist militants who were seen in the area were killed by the local villagers. Those attacks are suspected to be in retaliation for those killings, according to the country's interior minister.

==== February ====
On 21 February, seven members of the electoral commission were killed, and three others injured in a landmine explosion in Tillabéri. The attack was carried out on the same day of the presidential election's second round.

==== March ====
On 16 March, armed men on motorcycles attacked a convoy returning from a market in Banibangou by the Malian border to a nearby village in Southwestern Niger's Tillabéri Region, killing 58 people.

On 21 March, militants riding motorbikes attacked Intazayene, Bakorat and Wistan, three villages in the Tahoua Region close to the Malian border, killing 137 people. The death toll would make the attack the deadliest committed by suspected jihadists in Niger's history. Newly elected President Mohamed Bazoum condemned the attacks and declared three days of national mourning.

On 24 March, at least 10 people were killed during attacks at two villages in the Tillabéri Region.

==== April ====
On 18 April, at least 19 civilians were killed and two wounded when armed men raided a village in Tillabéri Region.

==== May ====
On 3 May, a military patrol was ambushed in the Tahoua Region, resulting in the killing of 16 soldiers and the wounding of six more. It was the first attack against soldiers in the country since the beginning of the year.

On 12 May, five villagers were killed and two more wounded after militants stormed the village of Fantio, in the Tillabéri region, during Eid al-Fitr celebrations.

On 30 May, four civilians and four soldiers were killed during a raid carried out by Boko Haram militants in the town of Diffa, in the Diffa Region. The jihadists attacked the town in the late afternoon, riding in about 15 vehicles, but were pushed back by responding security forces during a long gunfight, in which six attackers were killed.

==== June ====
On 25 June, armed men attacked a village and nearby locations, killing a total of 19 civilians. Initially, the attackers stormed the Danga Zawne village, in the Tillabéri region, killing three people. They then attacked nearby farms, killing the other sixteen people.

On 29 June, Boko Haram fighters opened fire on a bus along the road between Diffa and Maine Soroa, killing four civilians, including the bus driver, two villagers and a village chief; two more were wounded. The fighters then moved on another road and opened fire on a group of soldiers, wounding six of them. A gunfight erupted, and thirteen terrorists were killed.

==== July ====
On 2 July, around 100 heavily armed "terrorists" riding motorcycles attacked the Tchoma Bangou village, killing four civilians. Security forces responded to the attack, starting a gun battle, resulting in the death of five soldiers and 40 terrorists.

On 25 July, fourteen people were killed and one more was wounded as gunmen stormed the village of Wiye. Nine of the victims are killed while working at fields.

On 28 July, 19 civilians were killed and five more wounded as militants stormed the village of Deye Koukou in the Banibangou area, near the border with Mali.

==== August ====
On 1 August, Islamist militants ambushed and opened fire on a group of soldiers in Torodi, Tillabéri Region. As the soldiers were escaping and carried the wounded, a bomb exploded. Fifteen soldiers were killed in the attack, while six more are missing.

On 16 August, gunmen on motorbikes stormed the village of Darey-Daye, Niger, opening fire against civilians while they were tending their fields, killing 37 people, including 14 children.

On 20 August, gunmen opened fire against civilians who were praying at a mosque in the village of Theim, in the Tillaberi region, killing 16 people.

On 25 August, hundreds of Boko Haram militants attacked a military post in Diffa, killing 16 soldiers and wounding nine others. In the ensuing gun battle, around 50 Islamist insurgents were killed.

==== October ====
On 11 October, ten people were killed and another was wounded when gunmen opened fire at a mosque in the village of Abankor.

On 18 October, gunmen opened fire against a police station in Tillaberi, killing three policemen and wounding seven others.

On 20 October, six members of Niger's national guard were killed and several others were wounded when gunmen ambushed a convoy carrying the prefect of Bankilare and his bodyguards, who escaped unharmed.

==== November ====
On 2 November, Islamic State in the Greater Sahara (IS-GS) gunmen attacked a delegation led by the mayor of Banibangou, killing 69 people. The mayor and the leader of a self-defence militia were among those killed.

On 4 November, fifteen soldiers were killed as gunmen attacked a military outpost in the village of Anzourou.

==== December ====
On 5 December, hundreds of motorcycle-equipped rebels raided an international military base in Tillabéri, killing 29 soldiers. 79 of the invaders were killed.

On 5 December, 12 Nigerien soldiers and dozens of terrorists were killed in a battle near Fantio.

On 20 December, Soumana Boura, a leading member of the IS-GS, was killed by a French drone strike.

=== 2022 ===
==== February ====
On 18 February, an air attack on Nachade, Maradi Region, killed seven children and wounded five others. Local media blamed Nigeria without providing evidence, and Nigeria said it was launching an investigation.

On 20 February, at least 18 civilians were killed during an attack on their vehicle by armed men near the border with Mali.

==== June ====
On 16 June, around 40 terrorists were killed in a series of French drone strikes near the border with Burkina Faso.

=== 2023 ===
==== February ====
On 10 February, at least 17 Nigerien soldiers were killed in the town of Intagamey.

==== March ====
On 10 March, Nigerien forces were attacked in the western town of Tiloa. In pursuit of the attackers, Nigerien forces entered the Hamakat area of Mali, where they killed 79 terrorists. No casualties were reported by Niger.

From 13 to 19 March, Nigerien forces killed around 20 Boko Haram militants and arrested 83 others in an operation at the border with Nigeria.

==== May ====
On 7 May, seven Nigerien soldiers were killed after their vehicle ran over a landmine near the border with Burkina Faso.

==== July ====
In the first week of July, two leading members of the IS-GS were captured in a joint operation by Nigerien and French troops near the border with Burkina Faso.

On 14 July, one police officer and four civilians were killed in an attack near the border with Burkina Faso. Two terrorists were also killed.

On 26 July, a coup occurred when Mohamed Bazoum was detained in the Presidential Palace and Abdourahamane Tiani proclaimed himself the leader of a military junta. This led to a national and international crisis.

==== August ====
On 17 August, suspected jihadists belonging to JNIM killed 17 Nigerien soldiers and injured 20 in an ambush near the town of Koutougou. Over 100 assailants were killed when they retreated. The ISSP also attacked three villages, killing at least 50 civilians.

On 22 August, suspected Islamists killed 12 soldiers in Anzourou.

==== October ====
On 2 October, over 100 Islamists killed 29 Nigerien soldiers in Tabatol using IEDs and "kamikaze vehicles". The attack left an additional two soldiers seriously wounded, while several dozen jihadists were allegedly killed.

From 15 to 16 October, six Nigerien soldiers were killed in a series of clashes with terrorists near Niger-Burkina Faso border, officials claimed that in the same clashes' terrorists suffered 31 fatalities.

=== 2024 ===
==== March ====
2024 Tillabéri attack: On 21 March, an attack by the IS-GS killed 23 Niger soldiers and wounded another 17 in Tillabéri Region, Niger. Militants numbering over 100 attacked at night while the soldiers were in a security mission. The attack also led to the death of about 30 militants.

==== June ====
On 23 June, the Niger army killed 9 IS-GS militants including a high ranking commander "Abdoulaye Souleymane Idouwal" and arrested another 31 militants in an operation in Tillabéri region.

On 24 June, an attack by jihadist militants killed 20 Niger soldiers and one civilian in village of Tassia. A report by Niger army also stated that dozens of militants were killed in the attack and reinforcements were send to the village.

==== July ====
On 5 July, the Niger army killed more than 100 jihadists in ground and air operation as a response to the attack on 24 June which killed 20 Nigerien soldiers.

On 23 July, a clash occurred between the Niger army and jihadists near the village of Foneko along the border with Burkina Faso resulting in the death of 15 soldiers with another 16 injured and three missing. 21 jihadists were also killed in the clash.

==== August ====
On 3 August, the Jama'a Nusrat ul-Islam wa al-Muslimin movement took two Russian citizens hostage in Mbanga.

==== September ====
On 20 September, multiple jihadist attacks in Niger killed 12 Nigerien soldiers and wounded 30 others. In retaliation the Niger armed forces launched an air and ground assault killing more than 100 jihadists.

==== December ====
On 12 December, a jihadist attack on the village of Petel Kole near Burkina Faso killed 10 Nigerien soldiers and resulting gunfight killed 26 militants.

=== 2025 ===
==== January ====
On 11 January IS–GS subcontractors abducted a 73-year-old Austrian development worker Eva Gretzmacher from her home in Agadez.

==== March ====
On 21 March a jihadist attack against a mosque in Kokorou killed 44 people and injuring 13 others prompting the government to announce 3 days of mourning.

==== April ====
On 13 April a 63-year-old Swiss immigrant Claudia Abbt was abducted from her home in Agadez by the same men who abducted Gretzmacher.

On 24 April IS–GS insurgents ambushed a military unit north of the village of Sakoira killing 12.

On 25 April five Indian workers were abducted from their worksite near the Kandadji Dam.

==== May ====
On 15 May, suspected JNIM fighters took control of a military base in Boni, Torodi Department, near the border with Burkina Faso. The Burkinabe military reportedly sent a reconnaissance helicopter to assess the situation but left due to heavy gunfire.

On 25 May, an attack was launched by the Islamic State in the Greater Sahara on a base in Tillia commune, Tahoua region. Insurgents briefly occupied the base and looted ammunition, arms, and several vehicles. The death count was initially listed as 41, but was later appended to 58.

==== June ====
On 19 June, hundreds of IS-GS militants launched an attack by motorcycle on Bani Bangou, Talliberi Region, near the border with Niger, where they allegedly set fire to the local army and national guard camp and looted the city before retreating. The Nigerien Ministry of Defense later confirmed the attack, claiming 34 soldiers were killed and 11 were injured.

On 20 June, 71 civilians were massacred of and 20 more were injured during a Friday prayer gathering in Manda, Talliberi Region by IS-SP militants.

On 24 and 25 June, mutinies occurred within the Nigerien Army occurred in Filingué and Téra and refused to partake in a combat mission, demanding better resources and intelligence. The commander of the company in Filingué, Lieutenant Colonel Massaoudou Dari Mossi, was beaten by his men after opposing the mutiny, being transported to Turkey for hospitalization.

==== August ====
On 2 August, IS-SP militants claimed to have killed 31 government aligned militiamen near Anzourou, Tillaberi Region.

==== September ====
On 10 September, at least 27 Nigerien soldiers were killed by IS-SP militants in two attacks on the outskirts of Tillaberi. The first attack was an ambush on 5 pick up trucks carrying National Guard soldiers, and killed 15 while the second attack was on an army position next to the airport, killing 12 and burning down a refugee camp.

On 15 September, gunmen killed 22 people in Takoubatt, Tillabéri Region, including 15 who were at a baptism ceremony.

==== December ====
On 17 December, IS-SP militants attacked a military patrol in Goubey, Dosso Region. The attack killed 10 soldiers and 3 other security personnel, as well as destroying two vehicles.

=== 2026 ===
==== January ====
On 4 January, jihadists attacked the residence of the prefect of Torodi, who also was a captain in the Nigerien Army, killing him and his entire family. The jihadists also seized government vehicles and freed a couple prisoners during the attack.

On 18 January, over a hundred IS-SP militants entered the village of Bossiye, Tillaberi Region and rounded up 31 civilians, including 4 children, before executing them after they refused to pay a zakat. Another group of IS-SP militants opened fire at crowd in the village of Alfaga Daweyzé Koira who were protecting a villager accused of government collaboration, killing four and injuring five.

On 29 January, around thirty IS-SP jihadists launched an attack on Diori Hamani International Airport, taking control of the airport for two hours. The attackers destroyed and damaged several military and civilian aircraft in the attack and killed up to 24 Nigerien Soldiers as well as three Russian soldiers. The Nigerien military killed 20 militants and captured 11.

==== February ====
On 4 February, JNIM militants overran a Nigerien military position in Makalondi, killing at least 36 soldiers and injuring several others. JNIM also captured 12 military vehicles with mounted machine guns.

On 26 February, JNIM militants ambushed 26 members of Anzourou Self Defense Group, in the Tillaberi Region, killing 26 of them.

==== March ====
On 8 March, militants attacked a military base Tahoua Airport. Several attackers were killed, and five were arrested.

==== April ====
On 6 April, the IS militants clashed with JNIM militants at the Pétél Kolé border crossing, in the Téra Department, killing 35 JNIM militants.

==== May ====
On 14 May, JNIM militants ambushed a military engineer camp in Garbougna, Tillaberi Region, killing 67, including several civilians, and destroying the camp.

==== June ====
On 17 June, IS-GS militants attacked a military camp in Inates near the Malian Border. At least 51 soldiers were killed in the attack, with an additional 12 civilian casualties.

On 18 June, JNIM militants launched an attack on Niamey Airport. The attack lasted 2 hours and killed 2 civilians, 11 soldiers, and 22 militants. An additional 20 militants were arrested.

==== July ====
On 31 July, Boko Haram militants ambushed Nigerien military in N'Guigmi, Diffa Region, killing 10 soldiers and 4 national guard members.

== See also ==
- Islamist insurgency in Burkina Faso
- Mali War
- 2023 Nigerien Crisis
