= Ouallam Department =

Coordinates: 14°19′07″N 2°05′11″E

Ouallam
- Department
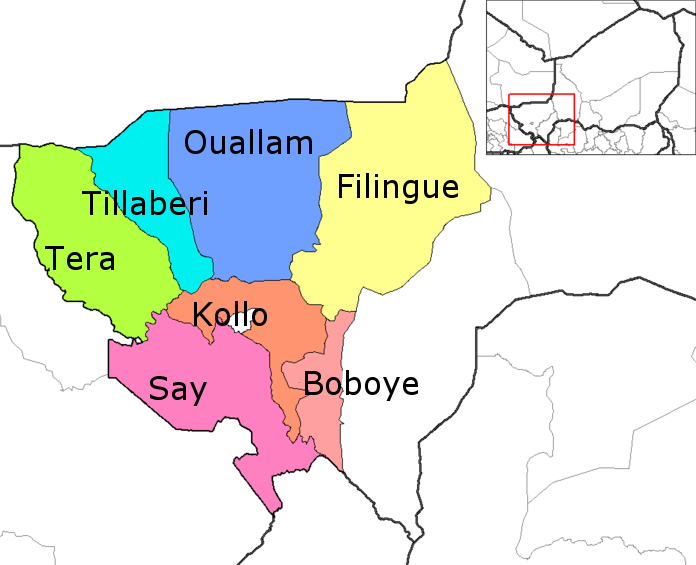
- Ouallam Department location in the region
- Country: Niger
- Region: Tillabéri Region
- Departmental: Ouallam

Area
  - Total: 22,093 km^{2} (8,530 sq mi)

Population (2012 census)
  - Total: 327,224
  - Density: 14.811/km^{2} (38.361/sq mi)
- Time zone: UTC+1 (GMT 1)

Ouallam is a department of the Tillabéri Region in Niger. Its capital lies at the city of Oullam, which is designated an Urban Commune. The department also includes the Rural Communes of Simiri and Tondikiwindi, as well as the towns of Bani Bangou and Dingazi. As of 2012, the department had a total population of 327,224 people.

Oullam department covers the historical region of the Zarmaganda plateau, and is one of the traditional homes of the Djerma people. The population remains largely Djerma with semi- nomadic Tuareg communities.

== Communes ==
- Dingazi
- Ouallam
- Simiri
- Tondikiwindi

== Intercommunal violence ==
In late 2008, the nearby village of Siwili was the scene of intercommunal violence, purportedly over accusations of the theft of domesticated animals.
