= Islamic State – Sahel Province =

Branch of the Islamic State in Sahel

- Leaders: Adnan Abu Walid al-Sahrawi †; Abu al-Bara' al-Sahrawi
- Dates active: 13 May 2015–present
- Groups: (Islamic State) Lakurawa (Islamic State) Soldiers of the Caliphate in Mali (Islamic State) Tolebe Fulani group of Katiba Macina (Islamic State) The Lions of the Caliphate in the Maghreb Al Aqsa
- Headquarters: Anderamboukane, Indelimane, and Tin-Hama
- Active regions: Mali, Niger, Burkina Faso, Morocco, Spain
- Ideology: Islamic Statism; Fulani extremism
- Size: c. 2,000–3,000 (2025)
- Part of: Islamic State

The Islamic State – Sahel Province (Note: Arabic: الدولة الاسلامية – ولاية الساحل, romanized: al-Dawlah al-Islāmīyah – Wilāyat as-Sāḥil, French: État islamique – Province du Sahel, Berber languages: Tadunt Taslamt – Tadunt Sahel) (ISSP), formerly known as the Islamic State in the Greater Sahara (IS-GS), is a transnational Islamist militant group adhering to the ideology of Salafi Jihadism. IS-GS was formed on 15 May 2015 as the result of a split within the militant group Al-Mourabitoun. The rift was a reaction to the adherence of one of its leaders, Adnan Abu Walid al-Sahrawi, to the Islamic State. From March 2019 to 2022, IS-GS was formally part of the Islamic State – West Africa Province (ISWAP); when it was also called "ISWAP-Greater Sahara". In March 2022, IS declared the province autonomous, separating it from its West Africa Province and naming it Islamic State – Sahel Province (ISSP).

== History ==
Al-Mourabitoun was created on 22 August 2013 after the merging of MUJAO and Al-Mulathameen. On 13 May 2015, elements of Al-Mourabitoun under the leadership of Adnan Abu Walid al-Sahrawi pledged allegiance to the Islamic State. It operated independently until 30 October 2016, when it was formally recognized by the Islamic State.

The group's ranks increased by dozens of Malian militants and sympathizers from the Gao Region near Ménaka.

On 1 November 2019, gunmen killed over 50 soldiers in the 2019 Indelimane attack in the Ménaka Region of Mali. A week later in Burkina Faso, gunmen stormed a convoy of buses for the Boungou miners, killing 37, although some estimate the death toll to be much higher.

On 28 November 2019, Spanish authorities issued a warning on the possibility of a terror attack in the region against Spanish citizens visiting or working in the Saharawi refugee camps in Western Sahara. Spanish authorities feared the attacks would coincide with the Spanish Día de la Constitución (December 6) celebrations. Secret services warned of the risk of a jihadist attack in the Sahara region at refugee camps in Tindouf, Algeria. The Sahrawi Arab Democratic Republic denied this threat. No attack happened.

On 10 December 2019, a large group of fighters belonging to the IS-GS attacked a military post in Inates, Niger, killing over seventy soldiers and kidnapping others. On 9 January 2020, a large group of IS-GS militants assaulted a Nigerien military base at Chinagodrar, in Niger's Tillabéri Region, killing at least 89 Nigerien soldiers.

During 2021, the group carried out massacres in Niger, mainly in the regions of Tillabéri and Tahoua, killing more than 600 people. The killings included the Tchoma Bangou and Zaroumdareye massacres, the March 2021 Darey-Daye massacre, the Tillia massacres and the 2021 Adab-Dab attack.

In December 2021, the French Army announced that it had killed in Niger, one of the perpetrators of the assassination of six French humanitarian workers and their Nigerien companions in the Kouré reserve in August 2020. The man is presented as Soumana Boura. The staff had identified him as leading a group of several dozen EIGS fighters, in the Gober Gourou and Firo area, in western Niger. a member of the Islamic State in the Grand Sahara (EIGS).

On 11 June 2022, the group attacked the town of Seytenga in Burkina Faso, killing at least 100 civilians in a massacre.

On 15 June 2022, it was announced the French military force captured Oumeya Ould Albakaye, a senior ISGS leader in Mali overnight between 11-12 June.

Between 2022 and 2023, the group saw major gains in the Mali War, occupying large swarths of territory in southeastern Mali. Tidermène was captured by the group on 12 April 2023.

In early April 2023, the group killed at least 44 civilians in the towns of Kourakou and Tondobi in Burkina Faso.

On 21 March 2024, the group ambushed Nigerien soldiers in Tillabéri Region, Niger, killing at least 23 soldiers.

As reported in the BBC in 2025, the Sahel has become the global epicenter of terrorism, now accounting for over half of all terrorism-related deaths, according to the Global Terrorism Index (GTI). In 2023, the region recorded 3,885 fatalities out of 7,555 worldwide, a nearly tenfold increase since 2019. The rise in extremist violence is driven by the expansion of groups like ISIS-Sahel and Jama'at Nusrat al-Islam wal Muslimeen (JNIM), which compete for land and impose strict Sharia governance. Political instability, weak governance, and military coups in Mali, Burkina Faso, Guinea, and Niger have further fueled the insurgency. These groups finance operations through ransom kidnappings, illicit gold mining, and drug trafficking, with the Sahel now a major route for cocaine smuggling from South America to Europe. Meanwhile, regional governments have shifted from Western alliances to Russia and China, relying on paramilitary groups like the Africa Corps (formerly Wagner) for security assistance, though with little success. The violence is now spreading to neighboring countries like Togo and Benin, raising concerns about further regional destabilization.

On March 22, 2025, Niger's Interior Ministry blamed an attack in Kokorou that left 44 Muslim worshippers dead while they were performing Friday prayers in the Islamic State. The attackers also set fire to a market and houses before retreating, according to the ministry.

On February 24, 2025, Morocco destroyed a terrorist cell known as "The Lions of the Caliphate in the Maghreb Al Aqsa." A similar cell was uncovered in the Spanish cities of Seville and Ceuta.

On 29 January 2026, the Islamic State's Sahel Province and West Africa Province launched a large scale attack on Diori Hamani International Airport in Niamey, Niger. The attack resulted in the deaths of twenty IS fighters and the capture of eleven others.

On April 28, during the 2026 Mali attacks, the group seized the border fort of Labbezanga after Malian troops abandoned it and fled to Ansongo. ISSP also launched an attack on Menaka that was repelled.

== Organization, forces and location ==
=== Commanding officers ===
The group was founded and headed by Adnan Abu Walid al-Sahrawi until he was killed by a French drone strike in Mali in 2021.

Following the death of Adnan Abu Walid al-Sahrawi, in Mali, Abu al-Bara' al-Sahrawi assumed leadership of the province on October 28, 2021.

In 2024, Heni Nsaibia reported that ISGS is operated by a majlis al-shura, or central leadership council, with a governor currently led by Abu al-Bara' al-Sahrawi. Under the majlis al-shura are four offices: the Law and Sanctions Office, the Military and Operations Office, Logistics Office, and the Foreign Fighters Office. The Law and Sanctions Office (LSO) is operated by al-Sahrawi, Youssof Ould Chouaib, Talha al-Jazairi, and Dadi Ould Chouaib. The Military and Operations Office (MOO) is commanded by Mohamed Ould Manaha, Youssof Ould Chouaib, Abdou Tchougel, Moussa Moumimi, Bolla ag Mohamed, and Joulde Pirodji, also known as Khatab. The Logistics Office (LO) is operated by Idrissa Ould Chouaib and Muawiya. The Foreign Fighters Office (FFO) is operated by Abu Hachim, Abu Umar al-Libi, and Abu Jafar.

There is also a Media Office run by the Majlis al-Shura. The media office propagates IS-Sahel and IS-Central propaganda.

=== Location and structure ===
IS-Sahel operates in five zones. Each zone is operated by an emir, a qadi (judge)

Zone 1, the Burkina Faso and Gourma zone, is located in Burkina Faso's Oudalan and Séno provinces, the Gourma region of Mali (encompassing Tessit commune and the surrounding area), and Niger's Bankilare and Téra departments. The emir, or leader, of Zone 1 is Sadou Tongomayel also known as Sadou Ibrahim or Almoustapha Ould Zeidi. Under Tongomayel's command are Moussa Moumini, Oumaya Ould Albakaye, Abu Houreira, Yero Belko, Moukailou Djibrilou, and Mamoudou Kouka.

Zone 2, the Haoussa zone, encompasses the Gabero, Bara, Bourra, Ouatagouna, and Tin Hama communes near Ansongo and Gao in Mali on the left bank of the Niger river. Baye Ag Adil is the emir of Zone 2, with Oubel Boureima and Moussa Djibo serving under him.

Zone 3, encompasses from Amalaoulaou to Akabar and Tabankort in rural eastern Mali, with a base located near In Arab. Bara' al-Sahrawi is the emir of this zone, with Abdou Tchoguel and Issa Barry serving under him. Both Zone 2 and 3 are collectively known as the Muthalath zone, or Triangle, referring to the confluence of the Nigerien, Malian, and Burkinabe borders.

Zone 4, also known as Anderamboukane, extends from Ménaka in Mali to Abala in Niger, with headquarters in Andéramboukane. Zoubeirou is the emir of the region, and Mourtala Magadji is the military leader.

Zone 5, also known as the Azawagh zone, extends from Tidermène in the north to the Ezza valley in the south. Khatab is the emir, and Magadji serves as the military leader there too.

=== Forces ===
In early 2017, Marc Mémier, a researcher at the French Institute for International Relations (IFRI), estimated that the Islamic State in the Grand Sahara had a few dozen men – not counting sympathizers – mostly Malians in the region of Gao. At the end of 2015, RFI indicated that the group's workforce would total around one hundred.

The early composition of ISGS was predominantly Sahrawi, although many were killed during the French intervention in Mali. Despite new leadership and a new demographic, much of ISGS' top brass are Sahrawi or Malian Arabs.

According to a report from the Combating Terrorism Center (CTC) at West Point, ISGS had 425 combatants in August 2018.

=== Settlement area and ethnic base ===
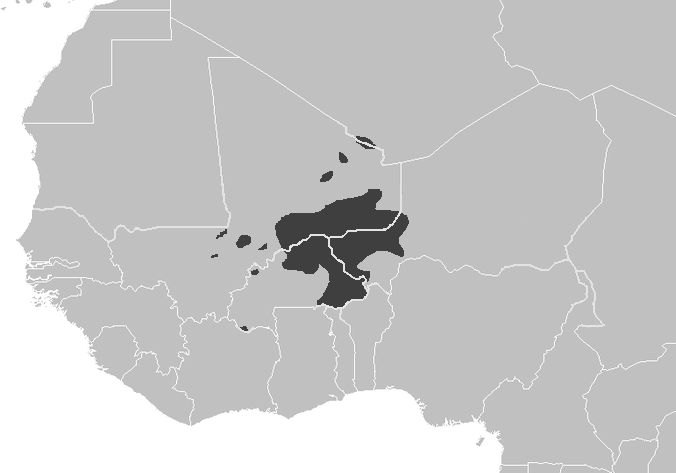
Map showing areas where the Islamic State in the Greater Sahara operated as of 2021

The group is based in the Ménaka region.

As with other armed groups in the Sahel, jihadists or not, the ISGS is part of a largely community-based dynamic. A large part of its combatants is thus Peuls. In Mali, the latter are for the most part Nigerien nationals whom the droughts in the Sahel and the demographic surge of Zarma and Hausa peasants, which is exerted from the south to the north, have pushed on the Malian side of the border. Adnan Abu Walid Al-Sahraoui won the support of many members of this community by promising to protect them against raids and theft of cattle carried out by the Tuaregs, starting with the Dahoussahak (Idaksahak).

However, ISGS would include members from the two communities. Thus, at present, the combatants of ISGS are divided into two katibas (combatant units), one composed mainly of Daoussahak and the other of Peuls.

== Analysis ==
=== Designation as a terrorist organization ===
| Country | Date | References |
|---|---|---|
| United States | 23 May 2018 | |
| United Nations | 23 February 2020 | |
| Argentina | 23 February 2020 | |
| New Zealand | 23 February 2020 | |
| Canada | 2 February 2021 | |
| Iraq | ? | |

== See also ==
- Tongo Tongo ambush
- List of Islamist terrorist attacks
- List of terrorist incidents linked to the Islamic State
- Jihadist insurgency in Niger
- Jihadist insurgency in Burkina Faso
- Islamist insurgency in the Sahel
- JNIM–ISSP war
