= Kidal offensive =

Military action by the Malian government

- Part of Mali War
Date	October 2, 2023 – December 20, 2023
Location	Kidal Region, Mali
Result	Russo-Malian victory
Territorial changes	Malian and Wagner troops capture most of Kidal Region, including Kidal, Tessalit, Aguelhok, and Anefis from the CSP; CSP rebels maintain control of Abeibara and rural areas of Kidal region

Belligerents
Mali; Wagner Group	CSP-PSD: MNLA; HCUA; MAA; GATIA (al-Mahmoud faction)	JNIM

Commanders and leaders
El Hadj Ag Gamou	Alghabass Ag Intalla; Bilal Ag Acherif; Mohamed Ag Najem; Fahad Ag Almahmoud; Hassan Ag Fagaga †	Iyad Ag Ghaly

Strength
600 men, 115 vehicles (as of October 2); 150–200 men (as of October 2)	Unknown	Unknown

Casualties and losses
Unknown	Unknown	Unknown
- 31+ civilians killed 40,000 to 50,000 civilians displaced

The Kidal offensive was an offensive by the Malian government and Wagner Group mercenaries against the rebel coalition Permanent Strategic Framework for Peace, Security, and Development (CSP-PSD) with the aim of capturing the rebel-held region of Kidal. The offensive was part of a renewed conflict between the Malian junta that took power in 2021 and former Tuareg rebel groups that had signed the Algiers Agreement in 2015, creating a ceasefire and de facto rebel control over the region. The offensive was also an attempt by Malian forces to seize control over MINUSMA camps in Kidal Region after the Malian junta had ordered the mission to leave the country by the end of 2023.

Malian and allied troops captured the town of Tessalit and its MINUSMA base in late October after clashes with the CSP-PSD for control of the city and the evacuation of Chadian peacekeepers. The Malian and Wagner forces then captured the regional capital of Kidal in the Battle of Kidal on November 14, and Aguelhok on December 20. Following the capture of the region, CSP-PSD fighters began blockades of major northern Malian cities, and exerted control of rural Kidal beginning in December.

== Background ==
In 2015, Malian officials signed the Algiers Accords with the Coordination of Azawad Movements (CMA) and Platform to seek an end to the Mali War and jointly crack down on growing jihadist groups. The agreement resulted in a ceasefire between the Malian government and the predominantly-Tuareg former rebels of the CMA, with the latter de facto controlling Kidal Region and parts of Gao Region. Platform, a coalition of pro-Malian ethnic militant groups including GATIA and the Movement for the Salvation of Azawad (MSA), also had control of parts of Ménaka Region and Tombouctou Region.

In April 2021, the CMA and Platform came together to form the Permanent Strategic Framework for Peace, Security, and Development (CSP-PSD), a political and military front to combat jihadist groups such as Jama'at Nasr al-Islam wal Muslimin (JNIM) and Islamic State – Sahil Province (ISGS). Just a month later, Assimi Goïta and disgruntled members of the Malian military staged a coup against Bah Ndaw, who had also come to power months earlier in a coup. Goita and the CSP-PSD got off to a rocky start; in December 2022, the CSP-PSD suspended participation in a United Nations monitoring committee for the Algiers Agreement, with the group claiming the Malian junta was unwilling to continue it. The junta claimed that there was growing collaboration between the CSP-PSD and jihadist groups. Around late 2022, the Malian junta enlisted the help of the Russian paramilitary Wagner Group in combatting jihadists, and also ordered the evacuation of French troops of Operation Barkhane.

In June 2023, the Malian junta ordered MINUSMA to cease operations in the country by the end of the year. Two months later, on the night between August 4 and 5, the CSP-PSD reported that Malian and Wagner forces had attacked a CSP-PSD checkpoint in Fooita. CSP-PSD representatives left Bamako just two days later.

== Prelude ==
The first major conflict between the CSP-PSD and the Malian government began on August 6 at Ber. Malian and Russian forces stormed the town of Ber and its Minusma base, which was defended by CSP-PSD fighters. Following the capture of the town and its Minusma base, CSP-PSD officials threatened to recapture it. On September 8, the pro-government militia GATIA denounced the bombing of one of its bases in Afalawlaw, near Gao. In response, the CSP-PSD accused the Malian junta and Wagner Group of "multiple breaches" of the Algiers Agreement ceasefire, and announced "all measures of self-defense would be taken in Azawad".

The CSP-PSD declared war on the Malian junta and Wagner Group on September 12. Several groups, such as the Movement for the Salvation of Azawad and later all of Platform, left the CSP-PSD. The junta did not react to the declaration. The CSP-PSD began a series of raids against Malian and Wagner military bases throughout September; Bourem, Léré, Dioura, Bamba, and Taoussa were all pillaged between September 12 and October 3, and dozens of Malian soldiers were killed.

In response to the attacks, the Malian junta launched airstrikes on Kidal on October 2, killing at least two people. On October 2, a Malian convoy left the town of Gao and headed north towards Kidal Region. The convoy was composed of 115 vehicles, six hundred Malian soldiers, and 150 to 200 Wagner mercenaries who were placed at the head of the convoy along with the 33rd Parachute Commando Regiment. The Malian army also had Bayraktar TB2 drones stationed in Gao, although the drones couldn't go past a 150-mile radius from the city, and were subsequently unable to reach Kidal.

Prior to the offensive, the CSP-PSD was composed of several groups; the CMA made up of the National Movement for the Liberation of Azawad (MNLA), the Arab Movement of Azawad's rebel faction (MAA), and the High Council for the Unity of Azawad (HCUA). Only one group from Platform remained: Fahad Ag al-Mahmoud's faction of GATIA. The exact number of fighters the CSP-PSD head is unknown.

== Offensive ==
On the day of the convoy's departure, a skirmish broke out between Malian and Russian forces. Jeune Afrique reported that a Malian soldier had shown up late to the convoy's departure, and was shot by a Wagner mercenary in response. The convoy's first stop was at Tin Aouker, seventy kilometers north of Gao. Later that night, the convoy reached Tarkint. That night, CSP-PSD insurgents began a "harassment campaign" against the junta. The next morning, several vehicles were hit by an IED near the town, destroying between one and six vehicles and injuring several Malian soldiers. The Malian junta did not release a report of the attack, although JNIM claimed responsibility on October 4. The convoy stayed in Tarkint for over twenty-four hours.

On the evening of October 3, the convoy reached Tabrichat, thirty kilometers north of Tarkint. That night, fighting broke out between the Malian army and the CSP-PSD, with the former lobbing artillery at the rebels. The Malian army claimed to have repelled the rebel attacks, and the CSP-PSD claimed the destruction of several Malian vehicles. The next day, Malian forces reached Tabankort, 170 kilometers south of Kidal.

=== Battle of Anéfis ===
CSP-PSD rebels ambushed the convoy on October 5 between Tabankort and Anefis, with both sides reported differing results. The CSP-PSD stated they stopped the convoy's advance, and that the Russo-Malian forces suffered heavy losses of manpower and equipment, including the taking of several POWs. The Malian army reported to have "broken the defensive curtain [of the rebels] with air and land actions". Once the convoy reached the CMA-controlled town of Anéfis, fighting broke out in the town. The Malian army claimed that the rebels suffered heavy losses, although the CSP-PSD stated eight fighters were injured and none were killed. Fighting continued in and around Anefis on October 6, with the Malian army claiming to have advanced further toward Kidal, a statement denied by the CSP-PSD. Civilians in Anefis fled to the towns of Tindarssan, Amassine, and Kidal.

The Malian Army seized control of Anefis on the morning of October 7. Both the CMA and Malian Army confirmed the capture of the city, and Malian forces remained stationed in the town for the next few days to receive reinforcements.

=== Battle of Tessalit and evacuation of MINUSMA bases ===
The Malian Army announced for the first time the objectives of the Kidal offensive on October 5: the capture of MINUSMA bases in Kidal Region and the transferral of power from MINUSMA peacekeepers to Malian forces. The MINUSMA camps in Kidal region were located in Tessalit, Aguelhok, and Kidal.

On the night between October 11 and 12, two planes dropped several dozen Malian and Wagner forces over the MINUSMA camp at Tessalit, in the heart of CSP-PSD controlled territory. Despite heavy rebel presence, Chadian peacekeepers from MINUSMA controlled the main camp in the city and Malian forces had controlled the town's airport since 2013. Another camp used by the French also had a Malian presence after being evacuated by France. CSP-PSD rebels captured three smaller camps in Tessalit formerly controlled by MINUSMA as the peacekeepers withdrew, and fighting began soon after as the rebels began ambushing Malian troops. Civilians fled Tessalit as clashes erupted, and MINUSMA reported that evacuation attempts by the peacekeepers in Tessalit were blocked due to the fighting and the blockage of MINUSMA convoys and flights to Tessalit by Malian forces.

On October 14, the CSP-PSD advanced and captured several abandoned MINUSMA posts near the Tessalit airport. Two days later, the Malian and Wagner forces landed two cargo planes at the Tessalit Airport, sparking brief clashes with the rebels with no casualties. A Malian drone strike on October 17 killed one CSP-PSD rebel and injured two others. Between October 16 and 17, 300 Malian soldiers and 150 Wagner mercenaries were present in Tessalit.

A significant part of the Chadian contingent was repatriated on October 17, despite Malian officials urging Chad and MINUSMA to stick to the evacuation deadline. Libération journalist Celian Mace stated that the Malian government had switched from hastening the evacuation of the peacekeepers in Kidal Region to urging them to slow down as the threat of CMA fighters capturing the MINUSMA camps in the towns before the Malian forces could get to them became more real. An agreement was reached between Mali and MINUSMA on October 18 allowing Chadian peacekeepers to repatriate "essential equipment" while "non-essential equipment" would be left behind. The agreement also ended the blockage of MINUSMA reinforcements in Gao and Tombouctou regions, and allowed all peacekeepers in Tessalit to return to Chad. Malian junta spokesman Abdoulaye Maïga accused France of "scaring away MINUSMA instead of allowing an orderly withdrawal."

Tessalit was entirely evacuated by MINUSMA on October 21, and Malian and Wagner troops quickly seized control of the camps in the town. Before withdrawing, Chadian forces had destroyed equipment that was left behind making it unusable for the Malian troops.

The Russo-Malian convoy based in Anefis began moving again on October 13, reaching Techanaght that same day. In Aguelhok and Kidal, Chadian peacekeepers had already begun the process of evacuating the camps, but the Chadian government mandated the peacekeepers remain in the towns so the MINUSMA arsenal could be taken back to Chad. By October 23, the peacekeepers had entirely evacuated Aguelhok, and the MINUSMA camp in the town fell under CSP-PSD control.

In Kidal, peacekeepers began the process of evacuation two weeks before the planned deadline. Malian officials tried to slow down the departure process by only authorizing small quantities of MINUSMA flights, although the peacekeepers in Kidal had already evacuated by October 31. The CSP-PSD subsequently captured the camp in Kidal that same day. A Minusma convoy of 100 to 150 vehicles and 850 peacekeepers fled to Gao, encountering IEDs and jihadist threats along the way. Despite numerous requests for Malian protection, the junta refused to grant air and ground surveillance to the convoy. Thirty-seven peacekeepers were injured in six mine attacks on the route. The convoy reached Gao on November 7, marking the end of MINUSMA's mandate in Kidal Region.

=== Kidal offensive ===
Malian forces launched airstrikes on Kidal from Bayraktar TB2s beginning on the night of November 3–4, targeting the CSP-held MINUSMA camp. No casualties were reported following the airstrikes. Drone strikes started up again on November 7, with three bombs targeting the MINUSMA camp. One bomb hit the camp and two fell outside of it, with one of the ones tat missed instead hitting a school. CSP-PSD officials reported that fourteen civilians were killed in the bombing and thirty more were injured, including twenty-one children. Medical sources told RFI that at least ten civilians, including children, had been killed. A community leader, a business manager, a teacher, and a member of the Kidal Interim Authority were also among the dead.

Kidal was hit by Malian drone strikes again on November 10 to 11, but no one was injured or killed. That same day, the Russo-Malian convoy began moving towards Kidal again. In response, CSP-PSD fighters cut off cell signal to the city to prevent saboteurs from releasing information about the strategic locations to Malian forces. Clashes broke out in the Alkit valley on the evening of November 11, thirty kilometers from Kidal. Heavy fighting lasted for two hours and ended at nightfall. Both sides reported conflicting results; the Malian forces claimed that they had "broken the defensive line" of the CSP-PSD, while the rebels claimed that Malian forces retreated with "considerable losses."

Fighting resumed in Alkit on the morning of November 12, with both sides once again claiming to have an advantage over the other. RFI stated that there were no changes in the frontline. The next day, Malian forces bypassed CSP-PSD positions in the valley by going south, and stated that they foiled a "series of ambushes" and "high-intensity skirmishes." Ten rebel vehicles were destroyed by Malian drone strikes in the fighting.

Malian and Wagner forces seized control of Kidal bloodlessly on November 14. A night attack by Wagner mercenaries had infiltrated the city, and was decisive in allowing Malian and Wagner forces to capture the city. The rebels retreated north towards Abeïbara and Aguelhok, with the CSP-PSD confirming their withdrawal from Kidal on the evening of November 14. Malian president and junta leader Assimi Goïta stated that operations to capture all of Kidal Region would continue.

== Aftermath ==
El Hadj Ag Gamou, a Malian colonel and founder of GATIA was installed as the new governor of Kidal following the CSP's withdrawal. Gamou took office on December 13. On December 20, the Malian Army captured Aguelhok with no resistance. On the night between December 21 and 22, a Malian drone strike killed longtime jihadist Hassan Ag Fagaga and four other rebels in Tinzaouaten. The CSP began besieging major cities in northern Mali in December. On February 11, the CSP ended its blockade of Timbuktu and Gao, but continued its blockade of Kidal and Ménaka.

Jama'at Nasr al-Islam wal Muslimin shot at Malian forces in Tessalit on December 3, with no casualties. The attack on Tessalit was part of a larger set of coordinated attacks, the deadliest occurring at Labbézanga and Ménaka.

The Malian junta officially ended the Algiers Agreement in January 2024, following the CSP's refusal to participate in junta-sponsored talks and higher diplomatic tensions between Mali and Algeria. In February 2024, the junta insisted that the CSP must lay down arms in order to begin negotiations with the government.

== War crimes ==
The CSP accused the Wagner Group and Malian forces of the massacre of seventeen civilians in Ersane, between Tarkint and Anefis. Local Idnane Tuareg community officials confirmed that Wagner and Malian forces perpetrated the killings, and that the victims were predominantly Idnane Tuaregs. Several bodies were found decapitated, and fifteen of the bodies were found trapped and bound with grenades and homemade mines. A resident of Tarkint stated that the bodies had to be blown up before they could be buried.

The CSP accused Wagner and Malian forces of three massacres on October 24. Eight people were killed in Lougui, in central Mali, four were killed in Tifindimata, Ménaka Region, and three were killed in Ber.

== Impact ==
The United Nations High Commissioner for Refugees (UNHCR) reported that 40,000 to 50,000 refugees from Kidal Region fled Mali towards the Algerian border on November 7. During the last census in 2009, Kidal Region had 68,000 inhabitants, with 30,000 in Kidal alone. This number swelled in 2022 as thousands of refugees fled the Islamic State's Ménaka offensive.

== Misinformation ==
Throughout the offensive, misinformation and doctored or fake images were prevalent on social media. Misinformation was also exacerbated by the fact that there were little to no journalists reporting from Kidal Region during the offensive, along with silence from Malian officials regarding the goals of the offensive. On October 4, users on Twitter posted photos claiming to be of the Russo-Malian convoy headed to Kidal. These photos were from previous exercises and movements of the Malian Army during Operation Barkhane. Similar posts were made by pro-rebel social media users, albeit to a lesser extent than pro-Malian ones.

== Reactions ==
Malian political parties remained silent about the Kidal offensive during and after it. When the Kidal offensive began on October 2, former Nigerien Tuareg rebel Rhissa Ag Boula, who opposed the July 2023 coup in Niger that overthrew Mohamed Bazoum, called on all his supporters to join the CSP-PSD in Mali and accused the Malian junta and Wagner of "inhumane and genocidal actions."

Abdalleh Ag Alhousseyni, lead singer of Tuareg rock band Tinariwen, cancelled a concert in Casablanca following the Malian capture of Kidal on November 14.

During the offensive on Kidal in early November, the European Union called for an immediate ceasefire and the resumption of negotiations. These statements were echoed by the United States, who condemned the attacks on civilians by the Malian Army.

== Videography ==
- Verified images of Tuareg attacks in northern Mali - Le Monde, October 5, 2023
- Mali: la bataille pour Kidal se poursuit, l'armée malienne et les forces de Wagner se rapprochent - France 24 on YouTube, November 13, 2023
- Comment l'armée malienne a-t-elle repris Kidal ? - France 24, November 15, 2023
