= Battle of Kidal (2023) =

2023 Mali War battle in Kidal, Mali

- Part of Mali War
| Date | November 10–14, 2023 |
| Location | Kidal and Oued Alkit, Kidal Region, Mali |
| Result | Russo-Malian victory |

Belligerents
| Mali; Wagner Group | CSP-PSD: Coordination of Azawad Movements; . MNLA; HCUA; MAA; GATIA (al-Mahmoud faction) |

Commanders and leaders
| El Hadj Ag Gamou | Unknown |

Casualties and losses
| Unknown | Unknown |
- 14+ civilians killed, 30+ injured

The battle of Kidal took place between November 10 and 14, 2023, during the Kidal offensive in renewed conflict between the CSP-PSD and the Malian Armed Forces and allied Wagner Group mercenaries during the Mali War. The city of Kidal had been under rebel control since 2014, and the 2015 Algiers Agreement enacted a ceasefire and Kidal Region subsequently was de facto controlled by rebel groups. When Malian and Wagner forces captured the city on November 14, it marked the first time in nine years that all Malian regional capitals were fully under Malian government control.

== Background ==
During the initial Tuareg rebellion of 2012 that began the Mali War, Kidal was a flashpoint of conflict between the National Movement for the Liberation of Azawad (MNLA), the Malian government, and jihadist groups. The first seizure of the city was in March 2012 by Ansar Dine and AQIM jihadists. The jihadists abandoned the city in January 2013 in the wake of Operation Serval, and was captured by the MNLA. Malian and French forces attempted to capture the town in May 2014, but were repelled by the MNLA and allied Arab Movement of Azawad (MAA) and High Council for the Unity of Azawad (HCUA) fighters, who created the Coordination of Azawad Movements (CMA) coalition. Shortly afterward, the Algiers Agreement was signed in 2015 and established a ceasefire between the CMA, the Malian government, and the pro-government Platform coalition, allowing the CMA to control Kidal. In 2016, GATIA, a member militia of Platform, attempted to establish itself in Kidal but was chased out by the CMA.

At the start of 2023, tensions had intensified between the Malian junta that took power in 2021 and the allied Wagner Group mercenaries against the Permanent Strategic Framework for Peace, Security, and Development (CSP-PSD), a coalition between the CMA and Platform. Malian and Wagner forces attacked the town of Ber in August 2023, the first major clashes between the two groups since the signing of the Algiers Accords in 2015. CSP-PSD spokesmen denounced the attack, and stated that retaliation would occur. The CSP-PSD then declared war on the Malian junta, and attacked Malian forces in Bourem and Léré.

== Prelude ==
On the night of October 2, 2023 a column of 800 Malian and Russian forces launched an offensive towards Kidal. They captured Anefis on October 7, and Malian officials announced their intent to recapture the MINUSMA camps in Tessalit, Aguelhok, and Kidal that same day. MINUSMA peacekeepers hurriedly evacuated the camp in Kidal by October 31, and the CSP-PSD seized control not long afterward. Many residents of Kidal left the city expecting clashes.

The MINUSMA camp was targeted by Malian Bayraktar TB2 drones on the night between November 3 and 4. No casualties were reported. The camp was targeted by drone strikes on November 7 again, with one bomb hitting the camp and two hitting outside of it. One bomb hit a school located near the MINUSMA camp, killing fourteen civilians, including eight children and injuring over thirty others. Medical sources speaking to RFI stated ten people were killed including several children, a teacher, a member of the Kidal Interim Authority, a business manager, and a community leader.

Between November 9 and 10, new drone strikes targeted Kidal, again without any reported casualties.

== Battle ==
On November 10, Malian and Wagner forces stationed in Anefis moved towards Kidal. That same day, CSP-PSD fighters cut phone lines to Kidal, preventing saboteurs communicating rebel positions to the Malian army. The next day, fighting broke out in the Alkit Valley, twenty kilometers from Kidal between the rebels and the Russo-Malian convoy. The clashes lasted for two hours until they ceased by nighttime. In the first spate of clashes, a Malian L-39 Albatros crashed by accident. Malian officials claimed that night to have broken the rebels' defenses, while the rebels claimed to have repulsed the Russo-Malian attack and inflicted significant losses.

Clashes resumed in the Alkit Valley on November 12. Both sides again claimed to have the advantage over the other, although RFI journalists stated that the frontlines had not changed. The Malian Army flanked the rebels from the south on November 13, reported that they arrived fifteen kilometers from Kidal and claimed to have foiled a series of small ambushes and attacks along the way. Ten CSP-PSD vehicles were destroyed in these engagements.

The Malian Army seized control of Kidal on November 14. A night attack by Wagner special forces was decisive in the Malian victory. CSP-PSD rebels fled north towards the towns of Abeïbara and Aguelhok. In a statement, the CSP-PSD confirmed their withdrawal from the city, but stated they would keep fighting against the Russo-Malian forces. Malian president Assimi Goïta stated "Today, our armed and security forces have seized Kidal. Our mission is not complete. I recall that it consists of recovering and securing the integrity of the territory, without any exclusion, in accordance with the resolutions of the Security Council." No losses were reported by either side on November 14.

== Aftermath ==
The Wagner Group, which for years had denied its existence in Africa and had remained discreet, openly displayed its presence in Kidal after its capture. Wagner forces raised their flag over the historic Kidal Fort on November 22, but the flag was replaced by the Malian flag on November 26. On November 22, GATIA founder and longtime Malian government ally El Hadj Ag Gamou was installed as governor of Kidal Region.
