= Battle of Ber (2023) =

2023 battle of the Mali War

- Part of Mali War
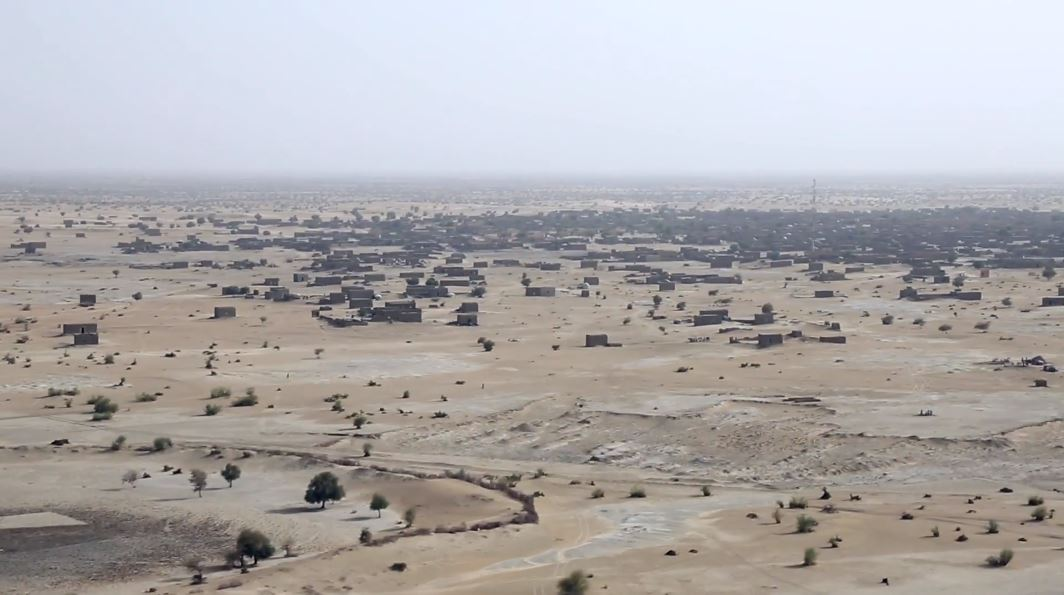
- The town of Ber circa 2017
Date	August 11–12, 2023
Location	Ber and outskirts, Tombouctou Region, Mali
Result	Malian victory

Belligerents
Mali; Wagner Group MINUSMA: Burkina Faso	CMA: MNLA; HCUA; MAA; JNIM

Casualties and losses
7 killed, 8 injured (per Mali); Dozens killed and injured, 1 prisoner (per JNIM) 4 injured	None (per CMA) 4 killed (per JNIM); 28 killed (per Mali)
- Several civilians injured

The battle of Ber took place between August 11 and 12, 2023, between the Malian Armed Forces and the Wagner Group against fighters of the Coordination of Azawad Movements (CMA) and Jama'at Nasr al-Islam wal Muslimin (JNIM). The battle was the first major confrontation between the CMA and Malian forces since the signing of the Algiers Accords, and led to the breakdown of the accords by late 2023.

== Background ==
In 2023, tensions between the Malian junta led by Assimi Goïta that took charge in 2021 and Tuareg rebel groups that were signatories of the Algiers Accords in 2015 rose dramatically. On the night between August 4 and 5, CMA fighters were attacked in Fooita, near Léré. The CMA released a statement deploring the deaths of two of their fighters, and accused Malian forces and the Russian paramilitary Wagner Group of perpetrating the attack. The Malian government and Wagner did not respond to the accusation. On August 10, CMA representatives left Bamako.

Following a request by the Malian junta on June 30, 2023, the United Nations Security Council terminated the mandate of MINUSMA, the UN peacekeeping force that had been in Mali since the beginning of the Mali War. MINUSMA peacekeepers began to leave Malian military bases in the months that followed. In Ber, the evacuation of the MINUSMA camp angered local CMA fighters due to the still-present threat of Jama'at Nasr al-Islam wal Muslimin (JNIM) jihadists. On June 9, a JNIM attack at the MINUSMA base killed two Burkinabe peacekeepers and seven others. In response, the CMA prevented Malian forces from taking control of the MINUSMA base in Ber.

== Battle ==
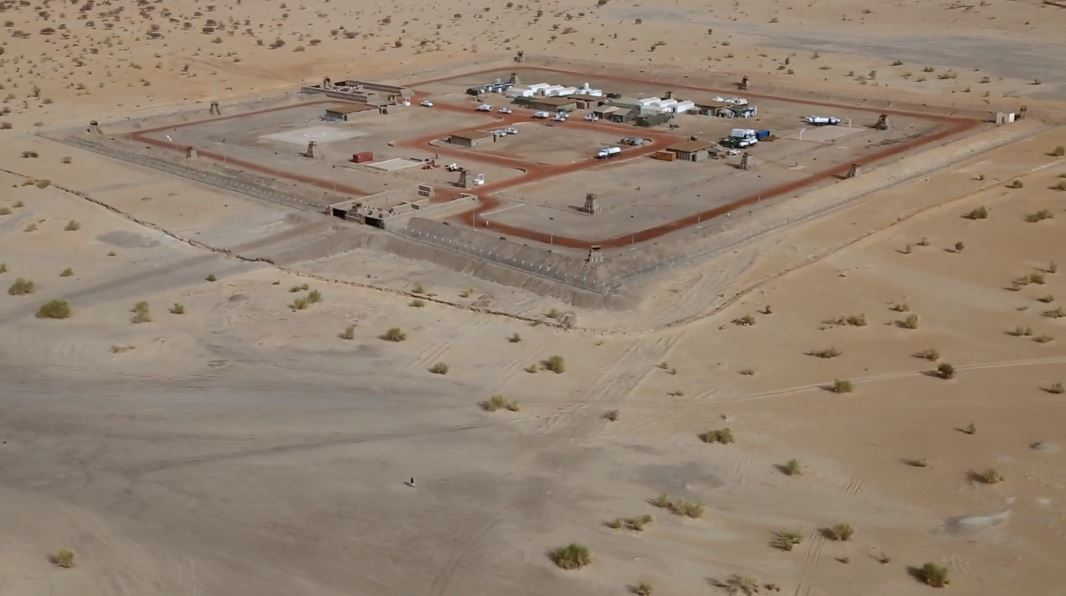
The MINUSMA camp in Ber circa 2017

At the beginning of August, a column of eighty Malian vehicles crossed the city of Timbuktu with Wagner Group militants. By August 11, the convoy was en route to Ber, fifty-six kilometers away. On the way, the Malian troops fell into an ambush conducted by JNIM, sparking clashes that lasted for over an hour. Parts of the Russo-Malian column took a different route to reach Ber, and arrived at a CMA position bordering a red line established between Mali and the CMA in 2014 around ten kilometers outside the city. Clashes broke out around the red line, and the Malian Army retreated. The CMA published a press release claiming to have repelled the Malian and Wagner forces, and denounced a "violation of ll arrangements and security commitments." The Malian Army reported clashes with "terrorists", but did not mention the CMA.

Fighting began the next day northwest of the city. The Malian Air Force launched airstrikes against Ber, while the Burkinabe peacekeepers discreetly evacuated the MINUSMA camp three days before the deadline. Malian forces seized control of the MINUSMA camp in the afternoon of August 12, while CMA fighters retreated deeper into the city. Over the coming days, Malian forces enacted control over the entirety of Ber.

== Aftermath ==
=== Casualties ===
The Malian Army released a statement claiming that the fighting left one Malian soldier dead and four others injured on August 11 and six dead and four injured on August 12. The junta claimed that the "armed terrorist groups" left four bodies on August 11 and twenty-four bodies on August 12, along with eighteen AK-47 rifles and twelve motorcycles. The communique also claimed the destruction of three vehicles during the airstrikes.

JNIM released a statement on August 12 claiming to have attacked Malian and Wagner forces, acknowledging the deaths of four jihadists and claiming to have caused "dozens of deaths and injuries" among the Malian and Wagner troops, along with the capture of a Malian soldier. In the statement, JNIM added photos of captured Malian equipment.

The CMA released a statement claiming to have confronted Malian and Wagner forces, but did not take any losses. In fighting on August 12, a resident of Ber testified to Libération that several civilians were injured and a CMA vehicle was destroyed in Ber, but the CMA did not suffer any casualties. MINUSMA reported the injuries of four peacekeepers during two attacks carried out on August 12.

=== Renewed conflict ===
The battle of Ber further weakened the deteriorating Algiers Agreement. The CMA threatened to launch a counterattack to capture the MINUSMA camp in Ber following the Malian seizure. Negotiations between the CMA and Malian junta had already been at a standstill prior to the battle; neither side was interested in disrupting the status quo for years. The Malian junta, however, had made the recapture of Mali's northern Kidal Region a priority.

The Malian Chief of Staff, Oumar Diarra, embarked on a tour of areas in Gao Region, Mopti Region, and Tombouctou Region, including the recently recaptured camp at Ber, between August 22 and 24. In early and mid-September, the CMA and the greater Permanent Strategic Framework for Peace, Security, and Development (CSP-PSD) alliance launched attacks on Malian and Wagner forces at Bourem, Léré, and Taoussa.
