= Battle of Bourem =

Battle in the Mali War

- Part of Mali War
Date	September 12, 2023
Location	Bourem, Mali
Result	Both sides declare victory

Belligerents
Mali; Wagner Group	CSP-PSD: MNLA; HCUA; MAA; GATIA (al-Mahmoud faction)

Casualties and losses
10 killed, 13 injured (per Mali); 97 killed, 5 prisoners, 39 vehicles destroyed, 15 vehicles captured (per CSP-PSD)	9 killed, 11 injured, 3 vehicles destroyed (per CSP-PSD); 46 killed, 20 vehicles destroyed (per Mali)

The Battle of Bourem occurred on September 12, 2023, when the Permanent Strategic Framework for Peace, Security, and Development (CSP-PSD) attacked the Malian Armed Forces and their Wagner Group allies in and around the small town of Bourem. The battle was the first major attack by the CSP-PSD on Malian forces since the Battle of Ber in August 2023.

== Prelude ==
During late 2023, tensions between the Malian junta that came to power in a 2021 coup d'état and the Coordination of Azawad Movements (CMA), a coalition of rebel groups that signed the Algiers Accords in 2015. On the night between August 4 and 5, 2023, a CMA post was attacked by Malian forces in Fooita. The CMA denounced the deaths of two fighters, and accused the Malian junta and the Wagner Group of being behind the attack. Malian and Wagner officials did not respond to the accusations. In the days that followed, CMA representatives left the Malian capital of Bamako. Tensions between the CMA and junta came to a head between August 11 and 12, when Malian forces captured the MINUSMA base and surrounding town of Ber from CMA fighters just before MINUSMA evacuated the base.

In the following weeks, tensions between the junta and Tuareg groups intensified. On September 8, the pro-government GATIA denounced the bombing of their base by Malian helicopters in Afawlawlaw, near Gao. The next day, the CMA announced that they had shot down a Malian Sukhoi Su-25 jet in Tinouake, north of Gao after the jet had bombed CMA positions. The Malian Air Force denied that the jet was shot down.

The CSP-PSD, a coalition of all rebel groups including the CMA and Platform, accused the junta and Wagner Group of multiple breaches of the ceasefire outlined in the Algiers Accords, and stated they would "adopt all measures in self-defense against the junta." The Movement for the Salvation of Azawad, part of Platform, distanced itself from this statement. On September 12, the CSP-PSD declared war on the junta.

== Battle ==
The town of Bourem was attacked by CSP-PSD fighters on the morning of September 12. CSP-PSD fighters quickly seized the Malian military camp in the northern part of the town after besieging it. Immediately after its capture, Malian Air Force jets launched airstrikes on the town and camp and sent troops to recapture it. Both the junta and the CSP-PSD declared victory at the camp. The Malian Army, in a statement released the same day, claimed to have repelled the offensive, and launched a counter-offensive against the CSP-PSD later on.

Journalist Wassim Nasr stated that the CSP-PSD fighters had captured four Malian outposts in and around Bourem, but were unable to capture the main base in the city. Later in the day of September 12, CSP-PSD and CMA officials claimed responsibility for the attack "against the Malian Army and the Wagner terrorist militia." The CSP-PSD stated that their offensive was carried out on four fronts, and that fighting lasted two hours. They also stated that four outposts were seized except for a Malian position in the eastern part of the city. The CSP-PSD also claimed control over the Malian base, although stated that they withdrew following intense clashes immediately after its capture. CSP-PSD spokesman Mahmoud El Maouloud Ramadane stated that "taking the city was not our initial objective, our objective isn't to stay in cities.'

== Aftermath ==
The Malian army stated that ten soldiers were killed and thirteen were wounded, and claimed that forty-six attackers. The CMA claimed the deaths of nine fighters, the injuries of eleven others, and the destruction of three of their own vehicles. They also claimed ninety-seven Malian soldiers were killed in Malian airstrikes while they were being held prisoner. Only five soldiers survived, including a colonel who was detained on September 13. Nasr stated that a captain, the son of a Malian general, was among the prisoners.

On September 17, CSP-PSD fighters attacked Malian forces in Léré, killing dozens of Malian soldiers.
