= 2023 Bamba attack =

2023 battle of the Mali War

- Part of Mali War
Date	October 1, 2023
Location	Bamba, Gao Region, Mali
Result	CSP-PSD victory

Belligerents
Mali	CSP-PSD: MNLA; HCUA; MAA; GATIA (al-Mahmoud faction)

Casualties and losses
25 killed 6 POWs; 3 VP11s captured	1 killed 4 wounded

On October 1, 2023, rebels from the CSP-PSD attacked Malian forces in Bamba, Gao Region, Mali.

== Background ==
Since the start of 2023, tensions had intensified between the Malian junta that took power in 2021 and the allied Wagner Group mercenaries against the Permanent Strategic Framework for Peace, Security, and Development (CSP-PSD), a coalition of the former rebel Coordination of Azawad Movements (CMA) and the pro-government Platform militias. Malian and Wagner forces attacked the town of Ber in August 2023, the first major clashes between the two groups since the signing of the Algiers Accords in 2015. CSP-PSD spokesmen denounced the attack, and stated that retaliation would occur. The CSP-PSD then declared war on the Malian junta, and attacked Malian forces in Bourem, Léré, and Dioura.

On September 7, 2023, jihadists from Jama'at Nasr al-Islam wal Muslimin raided the Malian military camp at Bamba in a simultaneous attack on the camp and a civilian ship in Gourma-Rharous.

== Attack ==
The CSP-PSD and CMA attacked the military camp in Bamba at 6am on the morning of October 1. Because of the jihadist attack less than a month beforehand, most of the camp had already been pillaged or damaged. Malian officials reported "intense fighting" at the camp later on the day of October 1, and the CSP-PSD claimed the capture of the military camp around the same time. RFI later confirmed photographs that showed that CSP-PSD and the CMA were in control of the camp at Bamba. The CSP-PSD and CMA took Malian equipment from the camp as they left.

The Malian army did not release a statement on the aftermath of the attacks, including the casualties of Malian or rebel soldiers. The CSP-PSD announced the deaths of twenty-five Malian soldiers during the attack along with six taken prisoner, and showcased videos of three captured VP11 vehicles and two pieces of heavy artillery. The CSP-PSD claimed that they only suffered one dead fighter and four injured fighters.

== Aftermath ==
Four days after the attack, the CSP-PSD ambushed Malian forces at the dam in Taoussa. The CSP-PSD claimed the deaths of nine Malian soldiers and two taken prisoner, as well as the destruction of thirteen vehicles and twelve others captured.
