= Battle of Léré (2015) =

- Part of Mali War
| Date | April 29, 2015 |
| Location | Léré, Mali |
| Result | Malian victory |

Belligerents
| Mali | CMA |

Casualties and losses
| 9 killed 6 injured 6–12 captured | 10 killed (per Mali); 16 injured (per Mali) |

On April 29, 2015, clashes broke out in Léré, Mali, between the Malian government and the Coordination of Azawad Movements (CMA) during stalled negotiations for the Algiers Accords.

== Prelude ==
For the first half of 2015 and late 2014, negotiations between the moderate Tuareg rebel coalition Coordination of Azawad Movements (CMA) and the Malian government had occurred in hopes to end the Mali War, spurred by a rebellion by the Tuaregs against the Malian government in 2012 and curbed by French intervention. On April 27, 2015, the pro-government GATIA rebel group seized the city of Ménaka after a short skirmish with the MNLA, a CMA affiliate. The CMA accused GATIA of breaking the ceasefire decided in negotiations. In Goundam on the morning of April 29, two Malian soldiers and a child were killed in a retaliation attack by the CMA.

== Battle ==
On April 29, the town of Léré was attacked by predominantly-MNLA fighters. At the time of the attack, the town was defended by a méhariste unit of the Malian National Guard, along with a component of the Malian Army. The rebels attacked from the west, and quickly seized the south-eastern portion of the town. Clashes stopped by the end of the day, at which point the Malian army was in control of the northern half of the town and two checkpoints in the western part. During the night, the CMA forces maintained their positions, and the meharistes received significant reinforcements from the Malian Army. The CMA fighters retreated from the city by daybreak of April 20.

== Aftermath ==
The Malian Ministry of Defense announced on April 30 that nine soldiers were killed, six were captured, and one vehicle was damaged. They also claimed that ten CMA fighters were killed, sixteen were wounded, and two vehicles were destroyed. The CMA claimed the capture of a dozen soldiers. Five injured CMA fighters received medical treatment in Bassiknou, Mauritania.

Following the battle, clashes broke out in Ténenkou and Tin Telout in May. The Algiers Accords were signed shortly afterwards.

== Videography ==
- Léré 4/29/15
