= Touzik clashes =

2016 battle of the Mali War

- Part of Mali War
Date	July 30, 2016
Location	Touzik, Kidal Region, Mali
Result	Indecisive: Battle of Adjlal one week later

Belligerents
GATIA	Coordination of Azawad Movements: High Council for the Unity of Azawad

Casualties and losses
5 killed	5 killed 3 injured 4 POWs

On July 30, 2016, clashes broke out between GATIA and the Coordination of Azawad Movements in Touzik, Kidal Region, Mali.

== Prelude ==
A week prior to the clashes at Touzik, a pro-government militia composed of Imghad Tuaregs (considered a vassal clan of Tuaregs by northern Ifoghas Tuaregs) encroached on Kidal, the capital of Kidal region and the headquarters of a coalition of rebel Ifoghas groups, the Coordination of Azawad Movements. Fighting broke out in Kidal, and GATIA was pushed out of the city.

== Clashes ==
A resurgence in fighting between the CMA and GATIA broke out on July 30, thirty-five kilometers southeast of Kidal near the village of Touzik. Both sides blamed each other for initiating the fighting. The fighting began in the morning, and that afternoon, both sides received reinforcements and resumed their attacks on one another. Smaller clashes took place in Adjlal and Tassik.

== Aftermath ==
Fahad Ag Almahmoud, the secretary-general of GATIA, claimed six CMA fighters were killed in the clashes. Malian media Kibaru, however, gave a death toll of twenty-five High Council for the Unity of Azawad (a member of the CMA) fighters and only one GATIA death.

A September 2016 United Nations report gave a death toll of five fighters killed on both sides each, with three CMA members wounded and four captured by GATIA.
