= Essouk =

Commune and village in Mali

Essouk السوق
- Commune and village
- Location within Mali
- Coordinates: 18°45′N 1°10.5′E
- Country: Mali
- Region: Kidal Region
- Cercle: Kidal Cercle

Population (2009)
  - Total: 2,383
- Time zone: UTC+0 (GMT)

Trade routes of the Western Sahara c. 1000–1500. Essouk is shown as Tadmekka. Goldfields are indicated by light brown shading.

Essouk (Arabic: السوق : "the market") is a commune and small village in the Kidal Region of Mali. The village lies 45 km northwest of Kidal in the Adrar des Ifoghas massif. The ruins of the medieval town of Tadmakka (Arabic: تادمكة) lie 2 km northeast of the present village. Between the 9th and the 15th centuries Tadmekka served as an important entrepôt for the trans-Saharan trade.

The commune is very large in area but sparsely populated. The 2009 census recorded only 2,383 people in an area of approximately 25,000 km^{2}. The village of Essouk has only a small permanent population. The rainfall is too low for rain-fed agriculture and almost all the population in the area are nomadic pastoralists.

== History ==
Tadmakka lies some 500 km north-east of Timbuktu in the desert heartland of the Malian Tuareg, and 45 km from the nearest town, Kidal. Its ruins stretch over a kilometre within the Essouk valley. The town prospered between the 9th and 15th centuries as an important entrepôt for caravans—a place where they could prepare for, or recover from, the hardest stretch of the Saharan journey. For caravans travelling south, the town served as the last stopping place before entering the Sudan.

While Timbuktu was almost unknown before the 13th century, Tadmakka was first recorded in Arabic texts in the 10th century, linked to trade with Ghana and Gao, the first historically documented West African states. The earliest mention to Tadmakka is found in Ibn Hawqal's Kitab Surat al-ard ("The Picture of the Earth" ), written in three successive versions between 967 and 988. However the first detailed account of the town was written by the Spanish-Arab historian and geographer al-Bakri in his Book of Routes and Realms which he completed in 1068:

...across the desert plain to Tādmakka, which of all the towns in the world is the one that resembles Mecca the most. Its name means "Mecca-like". It is a large town amidst the mountains and ravines and is better built than Ghāna or Kawkaw [Gao]. The inhabitants of Tādmakka are Muslim Berbers who veil themselves as Berbers of the desert do. They live on meat as well as on grain which the earth produces without being tilled. Sorghum and other grains are imported for them from the land of the Sūdān.

The Andalusian geographer al-Zuhri, writing in the middle of the 12th century, reported that the Almoravids helped Ghana in a war against Tadmekka in 1083-4 and as a result Tadmekka became Muslim. The historian Nehemia Levtzion pointed out that Tadmekka would have been a Muslim town well before this date and speculated that al-Zuhri may have been referring to the conversion of the population from the Ibadi form of Islam to the more orthodox Maliki school of Sunni Islam. Traders in Tadmekka would have had commercial links with North African towns such as Tahert and Ouargla where there were Ibadi communities.

The medieval town was spread in a north–south direction between two chains of rocky hills that run parallel to each other on either side of a wadi. The main section of the town was on the east bank and extended for 1 km by 200 m. A central section covering an area of 200 m by 100 m was built on a small island while the third section extended for 500 m by 200 m on the west bank. Associated with the town are number of cemeteries. In a cemetery lying to the southwest of the town, tombstones have been discovered that have Arabic epigraphs with 11th century dates. Rock faces on either side of the valley contain petroglyphs as well as inscriptions written using either the kufic or tifinagh scripts. Some of the Arabic inscriptions include 11th century dates.

Archaeological excavations were carried out between January and March in 2005 by a team led by Sam Nixon. Of the three areas of the town investigated, the most complete stratigraphic sequence was obtained at a location opposite the island on the eastern side of the wadi. A 5 m × 5 m (16 ft × 16 ft) area was excavated to a depth of 6.5 m (21 ft) before undisturbed soil was reached. A series of 12 radiometric dates were obtained from carbon containing material. The four samples from the deepest levels produced a range of dates centred on middle of the 8th century while samples from the top levels gave 12th and 14th century dates.

It is sometimes referred to as the "cradle of Tuareg civilization". The annual Saharan Nights festival showcases traditional Tuareg music as well as featuring various world music performers.

Oral tradition holds that Boctou, foundress of Timbuktu, was originally from Essouk. Essouk is also an important archaeological site, featuring rock carvings more than eight thousand years old.

== World Heritage Status ==
The archaeological site was added to the UNESCO World Heritage Tentative List on September 8, 1999, in the Cultural category.
