= Intadjedite =

Coordinates: 18°25′23″N 2°53′40″E

- Rural commune
- Interactive map of Intadjedite
- Country: Mali
- Region: Kidal Region
- Cercle (District): Tin-Essako

Population (2009)
  - Total: 5,381
- Time zone: UTC+0 (GMT)

Intadjedite is a rural commune in the Tin-Essako Cercle in Mali's north-eastern Kidal Region. The commune of Intadjedite as well as the neighbouring commune of Alata were created by law 001–041 dated 7 June 2005.
