= Tin-Essako =

Ti-n-Essako
- Commune and village
- Tin-Essako
- Location within Mali
- Coordinates: 18°27′0″N 2°29′20″E
- Country: Mali
- Region: Kidal Region
- Cercle (District): Tin-Essako

Population (2009)
  - Total: 2,595
- Time zone: UTC+0 (GMT)

Ti-n-Essako (or Tin-Essako) is a rural commune and village, in the Tin-Essako Cercle in Mali's north-eastern Kidal Region. The village lies 115 km due east of Kidal. In the 2009 census the commune had a total population of 2,595.
