= Battle of Léré (2023) =

2023 battle of the Mali War

- Part of Mali War
Date	September 17, 2023
Location	Léré, Mali
Result	CSP-PSD victory

Belligerents
Mali	CSP-PSD: MNLA; HCUA; MAA; GATIA (al-Mahmoud faction)

Casualties and losses
5 killed, 20 injured, 11 missing, 1 plane damaged (per Mali); 35 killed, 6 POWs, several dozen injured, 1 plane destroyed, 1 plane damaged (per CSP-PSD)	8 killed, 12 injured (per CSP-PSD); ~30 killed, 8 vehicles destroyed (per Mali)

On September 17, 2023, clashes broke out between the CSP-PSD and the Malian junta in Léré, Mali.

== Background ==
Since the start of 2023, tensions had intensified between the Malian junta that took power in 2021 and the allied Wagner Group mercenaries against the Permanent Strategic Framework for Peace, Security, and Development (CSP-PSD), a coalition of the former rebel Coordination of Azawad Movements (CMA) and the pro-government Platform militias. Malian and Wagner forces attacked the town of Ber in August 2023, the first major clashes between the two groups since the signing of the Algiers Accords in 2015. CSP-PSD spokesmen denounced the attack, and stated that retaliation would occur. They then attacked Malian forces in Bourem a few weeks later, with both sides declaring victory. Following the attack on Bourem, the CSp_PSD declared war on the Malian junta.

== Battle ==
At 1:30 local time on September 17, CSP-PSD fighters attacked two Malian military camps in Léré, Tombouctou Region, Mali. Fighting lasted for two hours, and the CSP-PSD seized both military camps in the town. RFI claimed that the CSP-PSD had also effectively seized control of the town of Lere during the battle, but journalist Wassim Nasr rebutted this and stated that Malian soldiers had sought refuge in the town center after the capture of their bases, and that the CSP-PSD did not enter the town. The CSP-PSD retreated from the bases between 2 and 3am on September 18, leaving with lots of weaponry and Malian equipment.

== Aftermath ==
The day after the battle, the Malian junta denounced an attack by "evil forces" against the military camps at Lere and promised retribution. Later that night, the Malian Army published a statement reporting the deaths of five Malian soldiers, twenty injured, and eleven missing. The Malian Army also estimated that eight CSP-PSD vehicles were destroyed with thirty men killed or injured, but stated that they only found the bodies of seven militants within the camps boundaries.

The CSP-PSD claimed the deaths of thirty-five Malian soldiers during the battle, along with six taken prisoner, several dozen injured, several vehicles captured, and a large number of weapons and equipment seized. They also stated eight fighters were killed and twelve were wounded. The CSP-PSD published several videos and photos of the attack on social media during and after the battle. They also claimed the destruction of a Malian L-39 Albatros plane above the city with photographic evidence, and claimed that another plane was damaged and eventually crashed. The Malian Army only acknowledged the downing of one plane due to technical issues, and stated its crew was still being sought out.
