= Kidal Cercle =

Coordinates: 18°30′N 1°25′E

Kidal
- Cercle
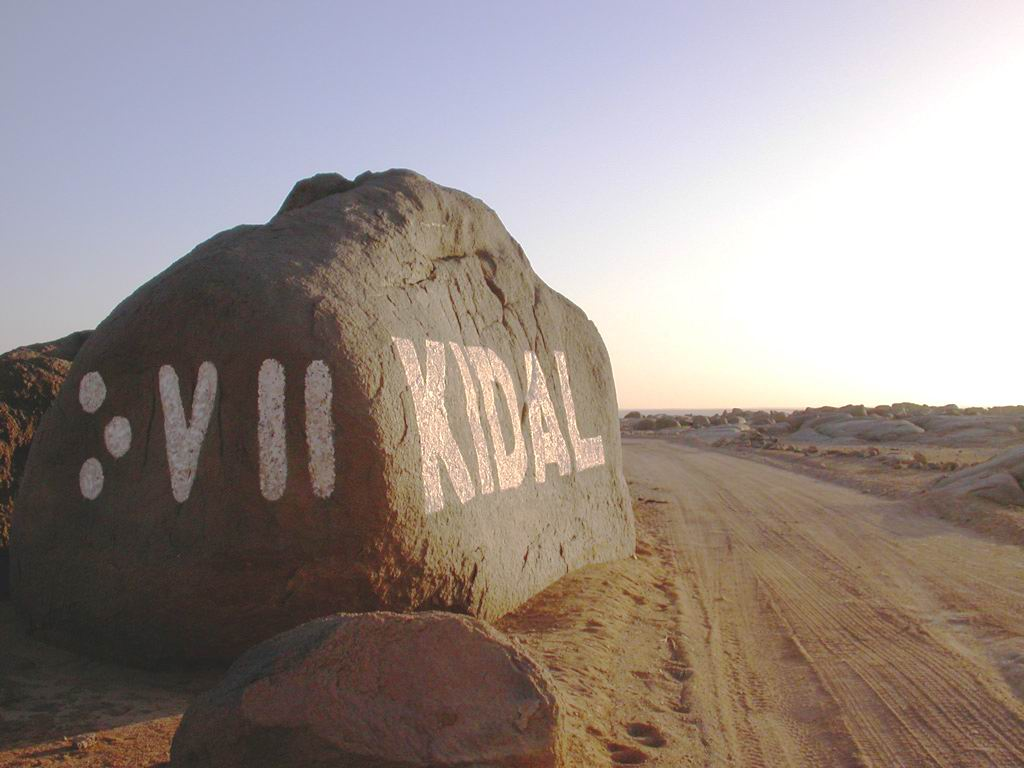

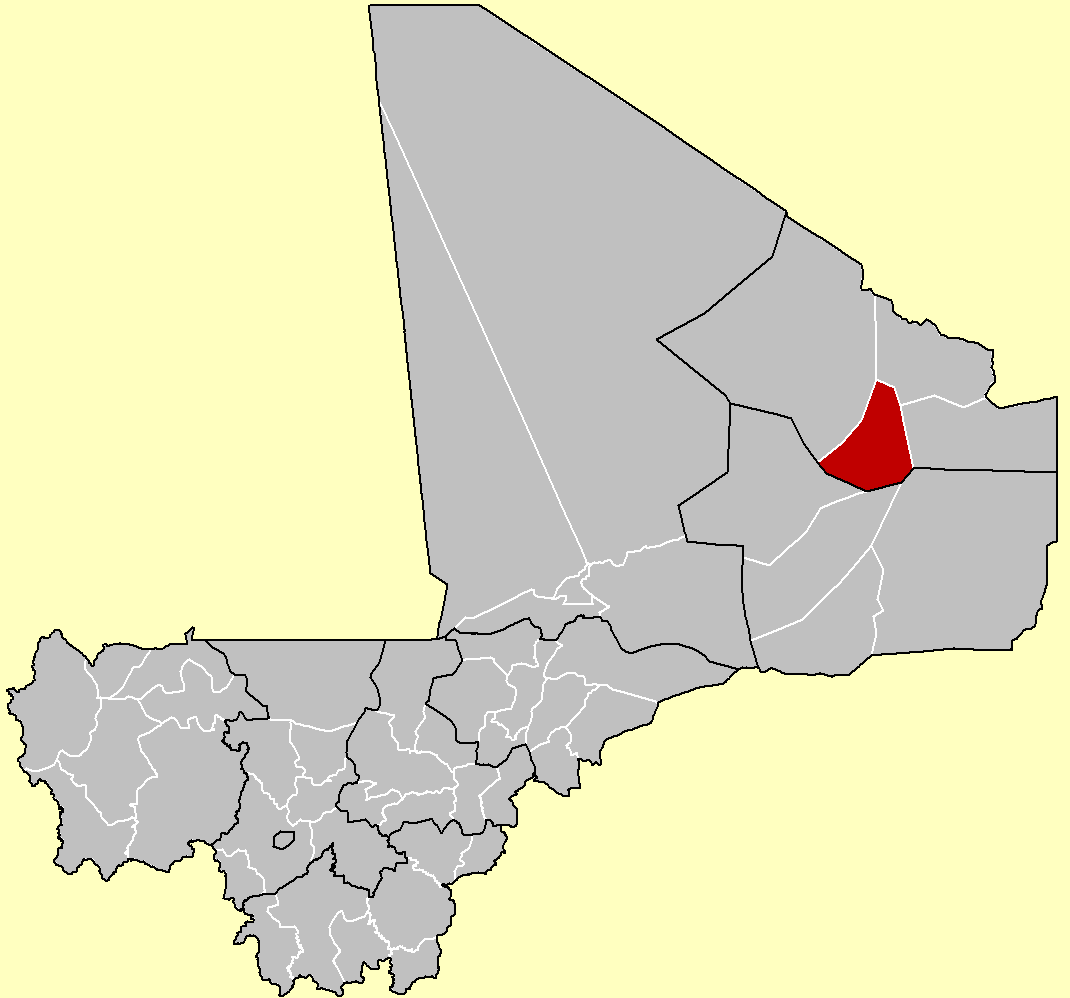
- Kidal Cercle in Mali
- Country: Mali
- Region: Kidal Region
- Capital: Kidal

Area
  - Total: 21,353 km^{2} (8,244 sq mi)

Population (2009)
  - Total: 33,087
  - Density: 1.5495/km^{2} (4.0133/sq mi)
- Time zone: UTC+0 (GMT)

Kidal Cercle is an administrative subdivision of the Kidal Region of Mali. The administrative center (chef-lieu) is the town of Kidal. The cercle is divided into rural and urban communes, and below this, quarters/villages. In 2009 the cercle had a population of 33,087.

The climate is typical Saharian with very little rainfall and large fluctuations in temperature. The average annual rainfall is around 130 mm but there are large year-to-year variations with 204 mm recorded in 1999 and only 66 mm in 1990.

The mountain region of Adrar des Ifoghas was taken by French and Chadian forces on 22 February 2013 as part of the Northern Mali conflict. The area of In Arab, near Anefif, was captured by MNLA forces on 29–30 March 2013.

== Communes ==
The Kidal Cercle contains the following communes:

- Anefif
- Essouk
- Kidal (an Urban Commune)
