= Battle of Ber (2018) =

2018 battle of the Mali War

- Part of Mali War
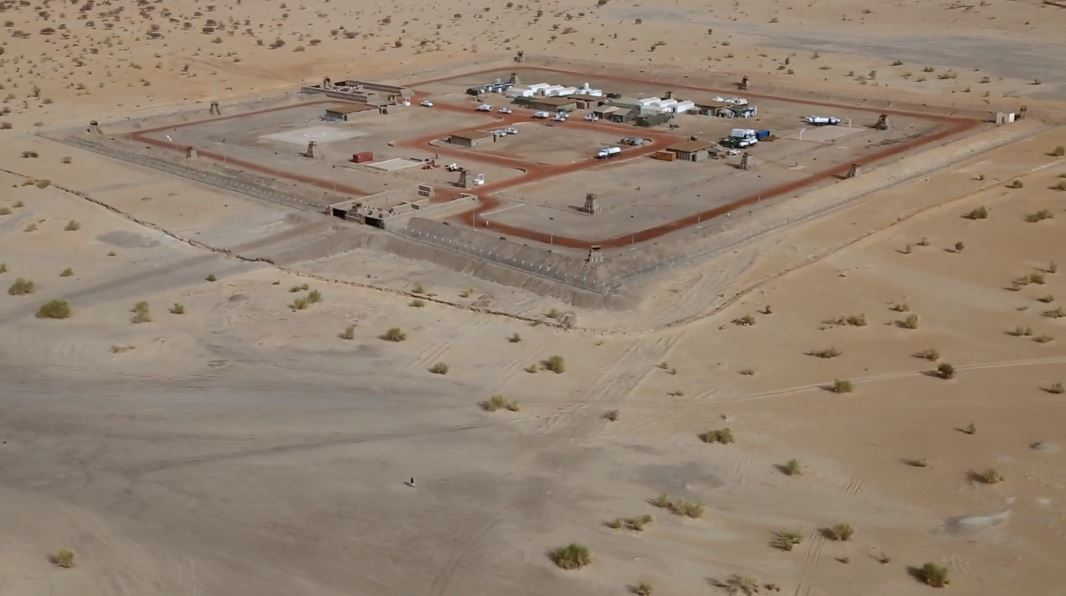
- The MINUSMA camp at Ber in December 2017
Date	October 27, 2018
Location	Ber, Mali
Result	MINUSMA-Burkinabe victory

Belligerents
MINUSMA: Burkina Faso	Jama'at Nasr al-Islam wal Muslimin

Strength
~100	80

Casualties and losses
2 killed 11 injured	2+ killed

The battle of Ber took place on October 27, 2018, after Jama'at Nasr al-Islam wal Muslimin (JNIM) militants attacked a MINUSMA base manned by Burkinabe soldiers in Ber, Mali.

== Battle ==
At 5:30 am, several pickups armed with rocket launchers, machine guns, or VBIEDs, attacked the MINUSMA camp in Ber, which was defended by the 1st and 6th companies of the Badenya Battalion. One of the suicide-bombing vehicles made it inside the camp, killing two peacekeepers. After reaching the base, JNIM militants attacked on foot, but were repulsed by the MINUSMA contingent. Afterwards, the Burkinabe peacekeepers chased after the militants.

On October 29, JNIM claimed responsibility for the attack, and claimed 80 militants were involved including two suicide bombers.

== Aftermath ==
The United Nations stated that two peacekeepers were killed and several injured in the battle. The Burkinabe army corroborated this, stating two soldiers were killed and five wounded. A December 28, 2018 report from the UN updated the toll, stating two killed and eleven injured. The hospital in Ber stated that JNIM had an unknown amount of victims, including children.

Mahamat Saleh Annadif, the head of MINUSMA, deplored the attack.
