= Achafghi Ag Bohada =

Malian rebel

- Born: 1967 (age 58–59); Tessalit, Mali
- Allegiance: Libya (1980s); Mali (until 2012); Ansar Dine (2012-2013); MIA (2013); HCUA (2013-2024)
- Commands: Chief of Staff of the HCUA (2016-2024)
- Conflicts: Battle of Kidal (2012)

Achafghi Ag Bohada is a Malian Tuareg rebel and Chief of staff of the High Council for the Unity of Azawad.

== Biography ==
Ag Bohada was born in Tessalit, Mali in 1967. He is a Tuareg from the Irradjanatan clan of the Imghad, a vassal clan of the Ifoghas. Like many other Malian Tuaregs, Ag Bohada joined Libya's Islamic Legion in the 1980s like many other Tuaregs, and then joined the Malian Army. He served under El Hadj Ag Gamou during the First Battle of Kidal, but was forced to flee to Niger. Shortly afterward he defected and joined Ansar Dine.

Following French intervention in Mali, Ag Bohada became the right-hand-man of Cheikh Ag Aoussa. Ag Bohada joined the Islamic Movement of Azawad and its successor, the High Council for the Unity of Azawad. Following Ag Aoussa's death in October 2016, Ag Bohada became the Chief of staff of the HCUA. In 2019, Ag Bohada's name was on a list of documents provided by the Nigerien government of CMA members suspected of collaborating with jihadists. Equipment taken by jihadists from the Tongo Tongo ambush was transferred to Ag Bohada following the attack. The CMA denied allegations of Ag Bohada and other members' involvement in jihadist activities.
