= Burkinabè units in MINUSMA =

2013 military operation

Soldiers of the Burkina Faso Armed Forces were deployed in United Nations Multidimensional Integrated Stabilization Mission in Mali (MINUSMA) between 2013 and 2023. During the mission, Burkinabe forces were the largest contributor to the mission, and often belonged to the best elements of the Burkinabe army.

== Badenya Battalion ==
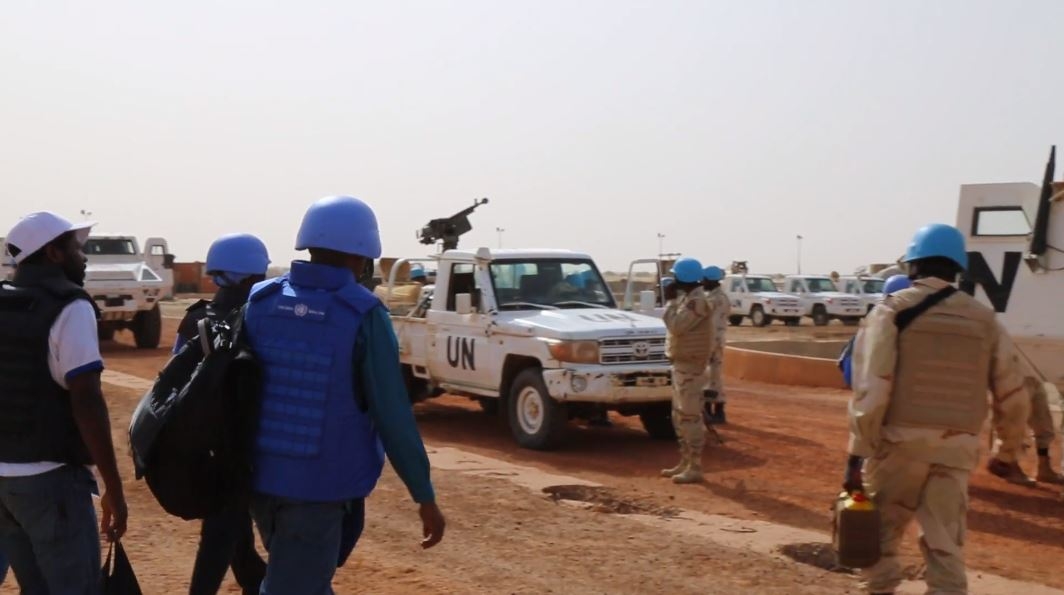
Badenya Battalion units in Ber, circa January 2017

The Badenya Battalion, meaning brotherhood in Bambara, was deployed in Timbuktu and Ber, and is sometimes called BFA BAT 1. The Badenya Battalion was first deployed in Diabaly as part of African-led International Support Mission to Mali (MISMA), the predecessor to MINUSMA, but then deployed to Gao and Timbuktu following MINUSMA's creation. Until 2017, the protection of the Timbuktu Airport was the battalion's main priority. They were replaced in 2017 by an Ivorian infantry company, although Burkinabe units defended the entrance to the nearby MINUSMA super camp. In 2018, the Badenya Battalion defended the camp and airport from jihadists during the 2018 Timbuktu attack at the camp.

The Badenya battalion was also responsible for securing and defending a large number of MINUSMA supply convoys across Mali, and defended the MINUSMA base in Ber in 2018. In 2015, during a supply mission, the battalion was the target of jihadists in an ambush near Takoumbaout.

Battalion Name	Dates Active	Corps commander	Size	Number of killed soldiers
Badenya 1	January 2013 - February 2014	Jules Bationo	850	2
Badenya 2	January 2014 - February 2015	Yves Patrick Ouedraogo	850	5
Badenya 3	January 2015 - February 2016	Giles Bationo	850	6
Badenya 4	January 2016 - January 2017	Cheick Alain Kabore	850	None
Badenya 5	January 2017 - January 2018			6
Badenya 6	January 2018 - January 2019	Elie Tarpaga, Cyprien Kabore	850	3
Badenya 7	January 2019			

The Badenya Battalion's mandate was not renewed in January 2019, and the soldiers and their equipment were transferred to the Gondaal Battalion. Many Badenya soldiers were transferred back home to fight the growing jihadist insurgency in Burkina Faso.

== Gondaal Battalion ==
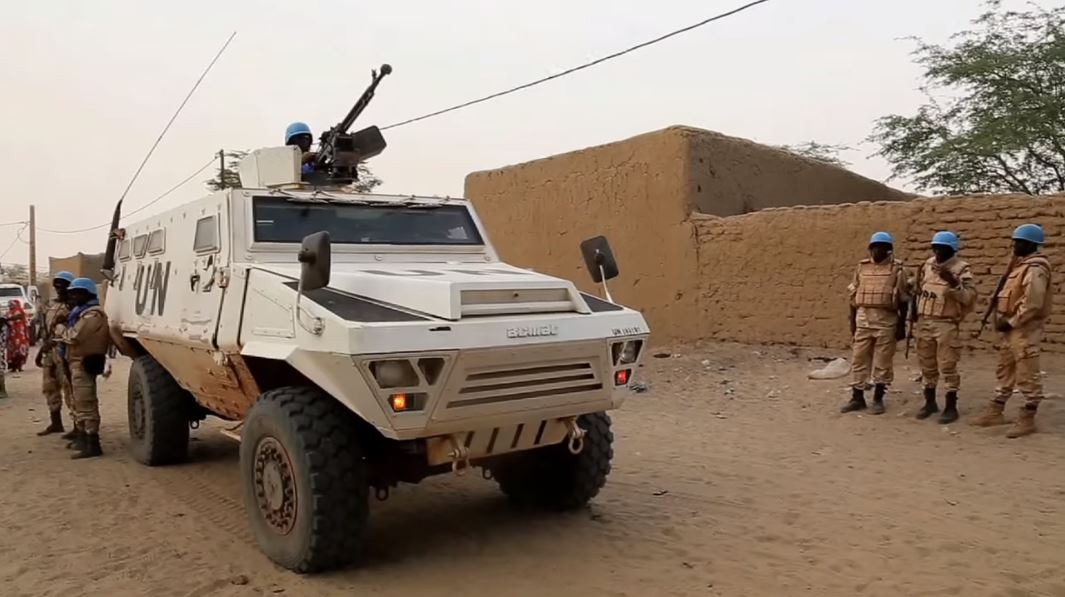
Gondaal Battalion units in Goundam, circa 2015

The Gondaal Battalion, meaning "good understanding" in Fulfulde, was deployed in Diabaly from 2015 to 2023, with detachments in Léré and Goundam. It is sometimes referred to as BFA BAT 2. In September 2017, the Lere camp was transferred to the control of Malian forces from G5 Sahel. The Gondaal Battalion had 850 soldiers from 2015 to 2018.

== Other units and equipment ==
In June 2016, 140 gendarmes were transferred to Gao under the command of Kanou Coulibaly within the 31st Peacekeeping Squadron, and were replaced by 140 new gendarmes in June 2017. A Burkinabe officer within MINUSMA committed suicide at his office in Gao on March 3, 2017.

The Badenya's platoons are equipped with Serbian Zastava M70 assault rifles and Zastava M84 machine guns as well as RPG-7 rocket launchers. They are also equipped with DShK and ZPU-2 heavy machine guns and 81mm and 120mm mortars. The company is motorized on Toyota Land Cruiser pick-ups, Ural-4320 trucks, and 30 ACMAT Bastion personnel carriers. Due to constant movement, the equipment wears out quickly.
