= Adjlal clashes =

2016 clashes in Kidal Region, Mali

- Part of Mali War
Date	9–10 August 2016
Location	Adjlal, Kidal Region, Mali
Result	Indecisive

Belligerents
GATIA	Coordination of Azawad Movements: High Council for the Unity of Azawad

Casualties and losses
1 killed 10 injured	7 killed 32 injured 5 captured

On 10 August 2016, clashes broke out between pro-government GATIA militiamen against Coordination of Azawad Movements (CMA) aligned groups near Adjlal, Kidal Region, Mali.

== Background ==
The city of Kidal came under Malian government control with the help of allied militias in May 2014, during the initial stages of the 2012 Tuareg rebellion. These allied militias were composed of Imghad Tuaregs, considered a vassal clan of Tuareg by northern Ifoghas Tuaregs (which inhabited Kidal). During the Algiers Agreement in 2014, the Malian government brokered a ceasefire with a coalition of anti-government rebels, the Coordination of Azawad Movements (CMA), allowing them to remain in control of Kidal. In 2015, GATIA signed a ceasefire with the CMA, announcing an end of hostilities between the two.

GATIA troops led by El Hadj Ag Gamou entered Kidal in early 2016, sparking a battle with CMA forces in July that pushed out GATIA from the city. Despite GATIA retreating, clashes broke out around Touzik a week later.

== Battle ==
Fighting broke out between the CMA and GATIA around 5pm on 9 August 2016, near Adjlal (also spelled Edjarer) despite a ceasefire agreed a week prior between the two groups. Both GATIA and the High Council for the Unity of Azawad, a member of the CMA, blamed each other for restarting the fighting. During a lull in fighting during the night, the CMA sent reinforcements. Clashes restarted on 10 August and ended later that day.

== Aftermath ==
GATIA claimed the deaths of thirty-nine CMA fighters and the injuries of thirty-four others. They also claimed five deaths of GATIA fighters and twenty-four injuries, three of which were serious.

A United Nations report concluded that seven CMA fighters were killed, thirty-two were injured, and five were kidnapped by GATIA. One GATIA fighter was killed and ten others were injured.
