= Baley Beri ambush =

Attack from the Islamic State in the Great Sahara

- Part of Jihadist insurgency in Niger
Date	May 14, 2019
Location	Siwili, near Baley Beri, Ouallam Department, Niger
Result	ISGS victory

Belligerents
Niger	Islamic State in the Greater Sahara

Commanders and leaders
Lt. Djibrilla Hassane †	Unknown

Units involved
112th Special Intervention Company	Unknown

Strength
52 men 6 vehicles	~100 men 4-5 vehicles ~20 motorcycles

Casualties and losses
33 Soldiers, 5 Vehicles; 27 killed; 6 wounded; 5 Vehicles: 2 vehicles destroyed; 3 vehicles captured	None (per ISGS)

On May 14, 2019, jihadists from Islamic State in the Greater Sahara (ISGS) attacked Nigerien forces in Baley Beri, Niger, killing twenty-seven Nigerien soldiers.

== Background ==
On May 13, 2019, a day before the attack, ISGS militants raided the Koutoukale Prison, which held notorious high-ranking members of the ISGS and Jama'at Nasr al-Islam wal-Muslimin (JNIM). The jihadists were repelled from the prison, and a Nigerien national guardsman was killed. The prison is considered the most high-security in all of Niger, and had undergone an attack by ISGS in 2016 in what started the jihadist insurgency in Niger.

== Ambush ==
Following the raid on Koutoukale, a patrol of Nigerien soldiers in Operation Dongo, a counter-terrorist operation launched several months earlier, were tasked with chasing down the suspects of the raid. This patrol consisted of 52 men and eight vehicles from the 112th Special Intervention Company based in Ouallam. At around 8 a.m. local time on May 14, the Nigerien soldiers were ambushed in the village of Siwili, near Baley Beri. The ambush began with a suicide car bomber, followed immediately by jihadists opening fire on and assaulting the Nigerien forces.

Testimony from survivors of the attack stated that around 100 jihadists took part in the ambush, transported on 4 to 5 vehicles and 20 motorcycles. The emergency calls made to Nigerien forces elsewhere to call for reinforcements were delayed due to the intentional downing of telephone lines in the area by jihadists a week prior to the ambush. Fighting between Nigerien forces and the jihadists lasted for two hours.

Three reconnaissance planes - one French, one Nigerien, and one American - were deployed later that day and flew over the combat zone several times but couldn't find the jihadists, who had fled to the north as Nigerien reinforcements arrived to comb the area. Three Nigerien vehicles were discovered during these operations, but the patrol's commander was missing.

== Aftermath ==
=== Perpetrator ===
The Islamic State in the Greater Sahara, through the central Islamic State's Amaq News Agency, claimed responsibility for the attack, along with the one on the Koutoukale prison. Nicholas Desgrais, a PhD student at the University of Kent, stated that he and other analysts thought that ISGS had lost operational capacity due to a massive offensive by Operation Barkhane, the Movement for the Salvation of Azawad, and GATIA in the tri-border region between Mali, Niger, and Burkina Faso. Desgrais stated that the Baley Beri ambush would mean a resurgence in ISGS' capabilities.

In August 2019, the Nigerien government accused the High Council for the Unity of Azawad (HCUA), a Malian Tuareg militia part of the Coordination of Azawad Movements (CMA), of participating in the Baley Beri ambush. HCUA officer Alhousseini Ag Ahmedou participated in the attack according to the Nigerien government, and equipment seized from the ambush was taken to the Inadar Valley in Mali and given to HCUA Chief of Staff Achafghi Ag Bohada. The HCUA denied the accusations.

=== Casualties ===
On May 15, AFP reported that seventeen Nigerien soldiers were killed and eleven were missing. ActuNiger reported that same day that on the day of the ambush, only 22 of the original 52 men found refuge at the base in Ouallam with three vehicles; the rest of the patrol was considered missing. The next day, the death toll increased to 29, and by the evening of May 16, the Nigerien Ministry of Defense stated that the death toll was 17 killed, 6 wounded, 11 missing, and two vehicles destroyed. A source within AFP stated on the evening of May 16 that 28 soldiers had been killed.

Twenty-seven soldiers were eventually reported killed, alongside the six wounded and two destroyed vehicles. The dead and wounded were found within a fifteen kilometer radius of the battle, and the bodies of the killed soldiers were buried in Tilwa, Niger on the night of May 15 and 16. The head of the detachment, Lt. Djibrilla Hassane, was among the dead. The Nigerien government declared three days of national mourning starting on May 16. The ISGS claimed 40 Nigerien soldiers were killed or wounded and three vehicles were captured in their May 16 statement. ISGS also claimed to have not lost any of their own fighters.
