= Mali offensive =

Mali offensive may refer to:

- 2026 Mali offensives, the offensive against the military junta by multiple groups
- Kidal offensive, the 2023 offensive by the military junta to retake Kidal
- Ménaka offensive, a series of offensives by the Islamic State - Sahel Province
