= Midal attack =

2017 battle in Niger

- Part of Jihadist insurgency in Niger
Date	July 5, 2017
Location	Midal valley, Tahoua Region, Niger
Result	JNIM victory

Belligerents
Niger	JNIM

Casualties and losses
5–6 killed 2–3 injured 4 vehicles captured	None

On July 5, 2017, jihadists from Jama'at Nasr al-Islam wal Muslimin (JNIM) attacked Nigerien forces near Midal, Niger. The attack was the first claimed by JNIM in Niger.

== Background ==
Jama'at Nasr al-Islam wal Muslimin (JNIM) is an al-Qaeda-aligned coalition of jihadist movements from the Mali War, consisting of Ansar Dine, Al-Qaeda in the Islamic Maghreb, Katiba Macina, and militants from other groups. The coalition was formed in March 2017. In the early 2010s, AQIM and al-Mourabitoun began sporadic attacks on French, Malian, and Nigerien forces in Niger when the jihadists attempted to traffick arms through Niger from Libya and Algeria. However, in October 2016 the newly established Islamic State in the Greater Sahara (ISGS) began exerting influence in Niger and attacking Nigerien forces. ISGS and JNIM, being provinces of the Islamic State and al-Qaeda, waged war with each other on behalf of their central commands, although JNIM exerted scarce influence in Niger and many of the clashes took place in Mali's Ménaka Region on the Nigerien border.

== Attack ==
Jihadists attacked a Nigerien patrol in the Midal valley in Tahoua Region on July 5, 2017. The valley is located a hundred kilometers from the village of Tassara and thirty kilometers from the Malian border. The attackers arrived on motorcycles and pickups, and fighting lasted from 5 a.m. to 8 a.m. Nigerien special forces and French forces arrived on scene and intervened in the attack, but the jihadists destroyed a communications post and fled.

The attack was claimed by JNIM on July 9, the first attack in Niger claimed by the group. In their statement claiming responsibility, JNIM stated they wanted to punish Niger for their "atrocities" in Mali and for Nigerien involvement with French forces of Operation Barkhane. Mauritanian journalist Lemine Ould Mohamed Salem stated that the Midal attack was an attempt by JNIM to expand their influence outside of Mali and to counter the growing influence of ISGS.

In 2019, the Nigerien government accused the High Council for the Unity of Azawad (HCUA) for complicity in the attack. A Nigerien government document obtained by RFI accused Bohada Ag Hamzata, head of security for Mali's Kidal Region, of participating in the attack and allegedly being seriously injured. Hamzata and the HCUA denied the accusations.

== Casualties ==
Local sources reporting to RFI, AFP, and Xinhua stated five to six Nigerien soldiers were killed, two to three were injured, and the JNIM militants seized four vehicles. JNIM did not report a death toll although they stated they did not lose any fighters, and stated they seized four vehicles with anti-aircraft weapons and light weapons.
