= Battle of In Arab =

2013 battle in Northern Mali

Coordinates: 19.4833°N 0.6667°E

- Part of Northern Mali conflict
- Battle of In Arab (Mali)
Date	29–30 March 2013 (2 days)
Location	between Anefif and Bourem, Mali
Result	ALF Victory

Belligerents
Azawad: MNLA	Movement for Oneness and Jihad in West Africa MOJWA

Commanders and leaders
Mossa Ag Attaher	Movement for Oneness and Jihad in West Africa Abou Haq Younousse †

Casualties and losses
7–9 killed 8 injured	17 killed 1 captured 4 vehicles destroyed

The Battle of In Arab was a two-day-long armed confrontation between a unit of the MNLA and a group of MOJWA fighters. The battle resulted in an Azawad victory but both sides suffered casualties.

== Timeline ==
On 29 March, Tuareg specialists part of the MNLA (Movement for the National Liberation of Azawad) clashed with jihadists rebels between the cities of Anefif and Bourem in Northern Mali, located on the border between the Kidal and Gao Cercles. According to the MNLA a military unit of the Azawad army clashed with terrorists elements from the MOJWA.

The battle was said to have lasted all day and left at least two to four fighters from the MNLA and five terrorists dead. However, a Malian security source said the fighting took place around the village of Almoustarat and left 20 dead on the side of the MNLA and two on the Islamists. The MNLA said that the nationality of the jihadists were listed as three Algerians, one Malian and one Mauritian, also one Tuareg was taken prisoner.

On 30 March, clashes continued in the afternoon around the village of In-Arab to the north west of Teghboubinene where the previous fighting was said to be held.

== Outcome ==
After two hours of allegedly battling the brigade of the "Signatories by the Blood" led by Mokhtar belMokhtar, the group was defeated leaving at least 17 dead, including five MNLA fighters and around twelve jihadists. Abou Haq Younousse the brigades leader was said to be among those killed
