= Cheikh Ag Aoussa =

Tuareg rebel leader

- Nickname(s): Abou Mohame
- Born: 1965 or 1966; Kidal, Mali
- Died: October 8, 2016; Kidal, Mali
- Cause of death: Car bombing
- Allegiance: Libya (1980s); MPLA (1988-1991); MPA (1991-1992); ADC (2007-2009); Ansar Dine (2012-2013); MIA (2013); HCUA (2013-2016)
- Rank: Second-in-command (Ansar Dine); Military commander (HCUA)
- Battles / wars: Lebanese Civil War; Toyota War; Tuareg rebellion (1990-1995); Tuareg rebellion (2007-2009); Mali War: Battle of Aguelhok (2012); Second Battle of Kidal

Cheikh Ag Aoussa, nom de guerre Abou Mohame, was a Tuareg rebel leader and prominent drug trafficker.

== Biography ==
Ag Aoussa was born in 1965 or 1966 in Kidal, Mali. Like many other Tuaregs, he went into exile in Libya in the 1980s and joined the Islamic Legion. Through the legion, Ag Aoussa participated in the Lebanese Civil War and the Toyota War. He returned to Mali in 1990, and fought in the Tuareg rebellion of the 1990s, fighting in Iyad Ag Ghaly's People's Movement for the Liberation of Azawad (MPLA). He refused to join the Malian Army after signing the National Pact peace deal in 1992, and instead made a living drug trafficking and trade.

Ag Aoussa helped Ghaly in 2003 conduct negotiations with the Salafist Group for Preaching and Combat to obtain the release of Western tourists. In 2007, Ag Aoussa took up arms again and fought in the Tuareg rebellion of 2007-2009, fighting for the May 23, 2006 Democratic Alliance for Change (ADC). After the war, Ag Aoussa was arrested on August 1, 2010, after threatening to kill Abdousalam Ag Assalat, the head of the Kidal regional assembly.

When the Mali War broke out in 2012, Ag Aoussa joined Ansar Dine, led by Ghaly, and became the group's second-in-command. He commanded Ansar Dine militants during the battle of Aguelhok in January 2012. According to a leader within the National Movement for the Liberation of Azawad (MNLA), Ag Aoussa was drawn to Ansar Dine less out of jihadist ideology and more out of solidarity between Ifoghas Tuaregs.

Ag Aoussa defected to the Islamic Movement of Azawad (MIA) at the start of Operation Serval. When the MIA merged into the High Council for the Unity of Azawad (HCUA) in 2014, he joined with them. As head of the HCUA's military command, he returned to Kidal in 2014. He commanded the HCUA during the Second Battle of Kidal.

On October 8, 2016, Ag Aoussa was killed when his vehicle exploded after leaving a meeting with MINUSMA representatives. While news agencies reported the explosion being the result of a mine, the Coordination of Azawad Movements and HCUA claimed his death was a targeted assassination. The groups claimed a bomb was placed in his car while he was at the meeting.

RFI recalled Aoussa as "a man known for his generosity, a fervent defender of Azawad, a notable who has always posed as a mediator between northern communities and a seasoned military leader with powerful networks" even "if some within the former rebellion point out the sometimes unspeakable nature of some of his activities and business partners."
