= Tin-Essako Cercle =

Coordinates: 18°35′N 3°05′E

Tin-Essako
- Cercle
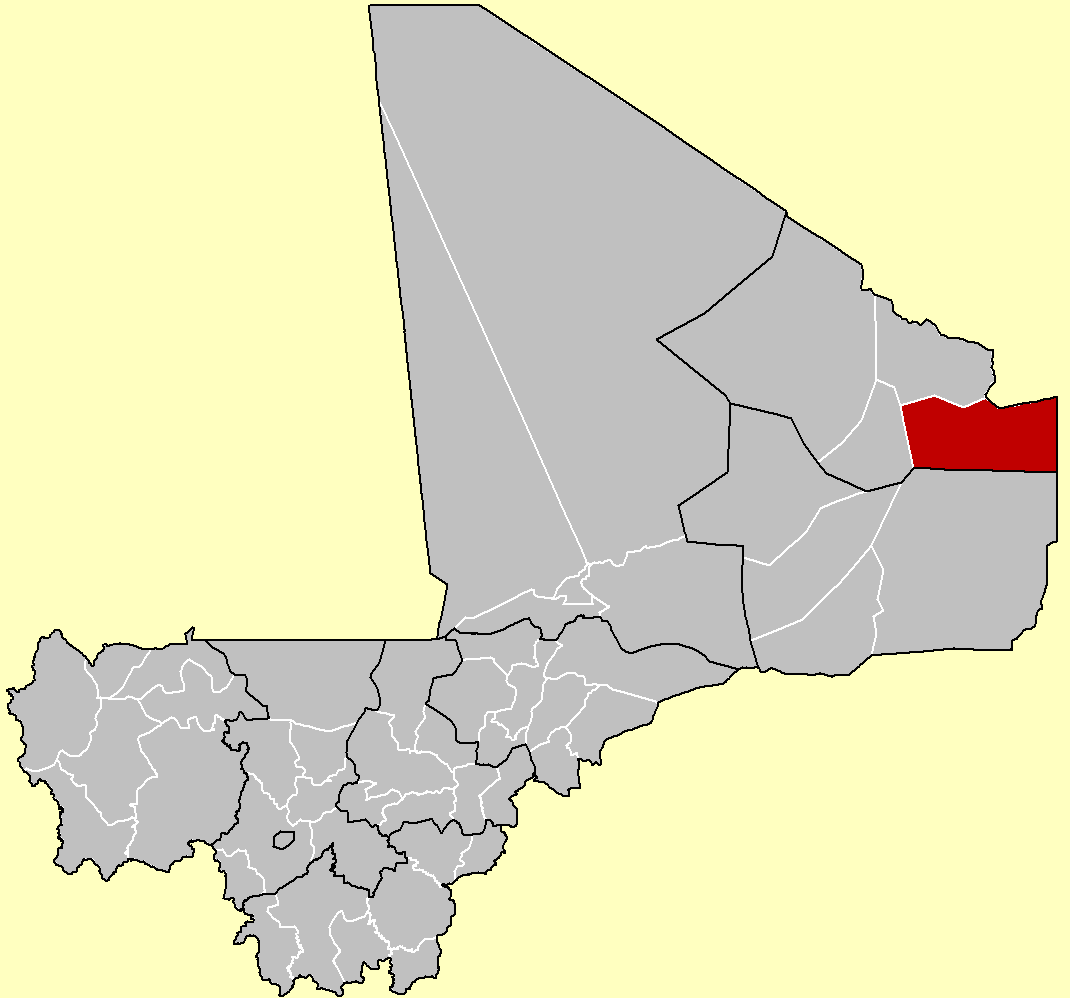
- Tin-Essako Cercle in Mali
- Country: Mali
- Region: Kidal Region
- Main village (Chef-lieu): Tin-Essako

Area
  - Total: 39,000 km^{2} (15,000 sq mi)

Population (2009 census)
  - Total: 7,976
  - Density: 0.20/km^{2} (0.53/sq mi)
- Time zone: UTC+0 (GMT)

Tin-Essako Cercle is an administrative subdivision of the Kidal Region of Mali. The administrative center (chef-lieu) is at the village of Tin-Essako. In the 2009 census the cercle had a population of 7,976 people. The cercle is the least populated in Mali and has an extreme Saharian climate.

== Communes ==
Tin-Essako Cercle contains the following two rural communes:

- Intadjedite
- Tin-Essako
