= Nina Wallet Intalou =

Malian businesswoman and politician

Minister of Crafts and Tourism
- In office 7 July 2016 – 27 July 2020
- Preceded by: Berthé Aïssata Bengaly
- Succeeded by: Kadiatou Konaré

Mayor of Kidal
- In office 1997–?

Personal details
- Born: 1963 (age 62–63) Kidal, Mali
- Children: 3

Nina Wallet Intalou (born 1963) is a Malian businesswoman and politician who has served as Minister of Crafts and Tourism of Mali from July 2016 until July 2020.

== Early life and education ==
Intalou was born in Kidal in 1963. She is of Tuareg origin, belonging to the Idnane tribe. Her father was a sergeant-major of the gendarmerie in Kidal. She has a license in public law.

== Career ==
Intalou has been a political activist and member of the Tuareg independence movement since 1984. In 1989, she founded a construction and sanitation company in Abidjan, Ivory Coast.

Intalou was elected mayor of Kidal in 1997, but Islamist pressures forced her to give up the post. President Alpha Oumar Konaré offered her a post of territorial adviser instead. In exile in Mauritania, she took part in the 2012 insurrection and became the only female member of the executive committee of the National Movement for the Liberation of Azawad, a separatist group seeking an independent Azawad. Tiébilé Dramé, emissary of interim president Dioncounda Traoré, called her the "strong man" of the group. In October 2015, she became vice president of the Truth, Justice and Reconciliation Commission.

Intalou was appointed Minister of Crafts and Tourism by President Ibrahim Boubacar Keïta on 7 July 2016. Her appointment was seen as helping create a political-ethnic balance within the government, calming those who were impatient with the slow implementation of the June 2015 Inter Malian peace agreement. She has been criticised as unqualified by nationalists in Bamako, and been the target of a hostile media campaign.

She was accredited Ambassador of Mali to Gabon on August 26, 2024

== Personal life ==
Intalou has three children with her former husband, who is a nephew of former Ivory Coast President Félix Houphouët-Boigny.
