= Battle of Kidal (2012) =

2012 battle in Mali

- Part of 2012 Northern Mali conflict
- Battle of Kidal (2012) (Mali)
Date	26–30 March 2012
Location	Kidal, Mali
Result	Azawadian victory

Belligerents
Azawad: MNLA AQIM Ansar Dine	Mali

Commanders and leaders
Abdul Karim ag Matafa; Assalat Ag Habi; Iyad Ag Ghaly	El Hadj Ag Gamou

Strength
500 men	Unknown

Casualties and losses
Unknown	560 captured (according to Ansar Dine) unknown killed 50–169 captured

The first battle of Kidal took place during the Mali war. On 30 March 2012, the city was captured by rebel MNLA and Ansar Dine forces.

== The battle and the city's fall ==
On 26 March 2012, the city of Kidal was surrounded by MNLA, as well as by the Islamist troops of Ansar Dine. An MNLA executive reaffirmed that there is no link between the two entities, but acknowledged that the situation is ambiguous. Reports from locals in Kidal however, stated that both groups led the operation jointly. According to reports, the men of Ansar Dine were the majority of the rebels during the battle. The MNLA claimed to have proposed to the governor of Kidal and Colonel Gamou to promote the surrender of the army to prevent bloodshed.

On 29 March, Kidal was attacked by Ansar Dine and the MNLA, the Islamists attacked from the south while the Independents launched the assault on the north. The first day, the assault was repulsed by the Malian soldiers, but the next day some Tuareg militiamen of Ag Gamou, especially the fighters from Libya, deserted and joined the rebels.

On 30 March, the rest of the soldiers, demoralized and exhausted, abandoned the city. A soldier close to the Colonel-Major Elhadji Ag Gamou reported that "We were 504 armed men, 300 tamasheqs and 204 from the south. Since the 23rd March in Kidal, the Tuareg rebels of the MNLA and the Islamist group Ansar Dine of Iyad Ag Ghali surrounded us. The MNLA wanted Ag Gamou to return to the ranks of the rebels, and Ag Ghali wanted his head, for searching the houses of Ifoghas families and especially forcing the son of the powerful Kidal Amanokal, Intalla Ag Attaher, to leave the city in February. . (...) We were tired, because we spent the day fighting off the rebels and ensured all the following night not to be surprised by an attack. At around 7:00 am, some of us started sleeping, but an hour later the first rebel fire was fired on the east side of the city. We did not want to fight anymore."

The MNLA claimed victory. Abdul Karim ag Matafa, the president of the revolutionary council of the MNLA arrived in the city. According to witnesses, elements of AQIM also took part in the clashes.

=== Aftermath ===
After the fighting, Iyad ag Ghali, head of Ansar Dine arrived in the city "at the head of a procession of vehicles. The governor of the region, six other local officials, the army zone commander, the colonel of special units and the head of the gendarmerie "are held in security" with a traditional chief, according to a local official's report.

== Ag Gamou's ploy for retreat ==
The Army withdraw to the south, after Colonel Alhaji Ag Gamou called Assalat Ag Habi, MNLA colonel who occupied the area and declared that he accepts his offer to join the MNLA in exchange for protection against Ansar Dine. "We left the city aboard our BM21, BRDM and dozens of 4X4 Toyota, in the direction of Gao. The next day, March 31, the day of Gao's fall, we were 150 km south of Kidal, when several dozen cars of the MNLA fighters, commanded by the same colonel Assalat Ag Habi, surrounded us. He told Ag Gamou that to move freely on the territory of Azawad, he had to formally pledge allegiance to the MNLA and disarm his soldiers from the south. This is how the idea of calling RFI came. " On 31 March, Ag Gamou told Radio France Internationale that he joined the MNLA. However, later revealed that was the "defection" was only a ploy used by Ag Gamou so he would retreat south safety with his soldiers. Colonel Ag habi asked that the 204 soldiers from southern Mali be delivered to him as prisoners of war but Ag Gamou refused. He then headed with his men to Niger, 100 kilometers from the border, he called the consul of Mali in Niger by satellite phone to ask them to prepare for the arrival of his South-Malian men so they can be repatriated to Bamako, via Burkina Faso. Subsequently, Gamou folds himself in Niger with his family and his Tuareg militia. After that he informed the Malian government that his allegiance to the MNLA on RFI was a maneuver aimed at fleeing and he is ready to resume the fight.

== Aftermath ==
After the battle, the camp of the National Guard was looted and partly burned, the houses of officers were also sacked by residents. According to local accounts, the prisoners were well treated and Iyad Ag Ghaly gave instructions so that the civilians were not brutalized. In a video published on 11 July by Ansar Dine, the Islamist movement claimed to have captured 560 Malian soldiers in the battles of Aguel'hoc, Tessalit and Kidal. They were released after "giving their word never to fight the sharia of Islam." This number may be exaggerated, but on 14 April 2012, the Islamists of Ansar Dine released 169 Malian military prisoners, as well as 14 civilians belonging to families of soldiers.
