= List of regions of Mali by Human Development Index =

This is a list of regions of Mali (with 2012 borders) by Human Development Index as of 2023

Note: Gao Region (including the newly created Ménaka Region) and Kidal Region are grouped and have their own HDI.

Rank	Region	HDI (2023)
Medium human development
1	Bamako	0.582
Low human development
2	Koulikoro	0.422
–	Mali (average)	0.419
3	Sikasso	0.401
4	Kayes	0.388
5	Gao (with Ménaka) and Kidal	0.382
6	Ségou	0.374
7	Mopti	0.350
8	Tombouctou (with Taoudénit)	0.328

== See also ==
- List of countries by Human Development Index
