= Tin Telout ambush =

- Part of Mali War
Date	May 11, 2015
Location	Tin Telout, Tombouctou Region, Mali
Result	CMA victory

Belligerents
Mali; Malian Army	Coordination of Azawad Movements

Strength
50–100 soldiers 8 vehicles	50 fighters 4 vehicles

Casualties and losses
9 killed 14 injured 2 vehicles destroyed 3 vehicles captured	None

On May 11, 2015, a Malian convoy was ambushed by Coordination of Azawad Movements (CMA) fighters in Tin Telout, Tombouctou Region, Mali. The ambush was the last conflict between the Malian government and CMA before the signing of the Algiers Accords.

== Background ==
In 2012, Tuareg rebels in northern Mali rebelled against the government, capturing swathes of territory. The rebellion quickly splintered, however, between the moderate MNLA and jihadist groups like Ansar Dine and MOJWA. The MNLA and several other Azawadi nationalist groups allied under a coalition dubbed the Coordination of Azawad Movements, which entered negotiations with the Malian government in late 2014. By May 2015, negotiations for the Algiers Accords were drafted.

== Ambush ==
On the morning of May 11, a convoy of Malian vehicles left Goundam for the regional capital of Timbuktu. Around 9:30am, when the convoy arrived near the Tuareg village of Tin Telout, the soldiers were ambushed by CMA fighters. Fighting broke out between the Malian forces and the Tuareg rebels throughout the town, and possibly the nearby town of Acharane. A source within MINUSMA reported that the ambush was carefully prepared by the CMA, aboard four vehicles. Ten civilians were caught in the crossfire of the attack, but none were killed or injured.

== Aftermath ==
The head of an NGO in Timbuktu and a local security source told AFP that eight Malian soldiers were killed, ten were injured, and two Malian vehicles were destroyed. One CMA vehicle was destroyed as well. A CMA spokesperson told Reuters that twenty people were killed in the ambush. The Malian ministry of defense reported the night of May 11 that nine soldiers were killed and fourteen were wounded. The CMA stated that they did not suffer any losses in a May 12 statement. They also claimed the capture of three Malian vehicles and two were destroyed, and estimated that thirty Malian soldiers were killed or injured.

MINUSMA denounced a violation of the ceasefire agreed upon between the CMA and Malian government, and called for rebels to return to their original positions. Four days later, the Algiers Accords were signed.
