= VP11 =

Chinese mine-resistant vehicle

The VP11 is a family of mine-protected patrol vehicles, produced by China North Industries (Norinco). The family of vehicles were first introduced at a trade show in Zhuhai, China, in November 2014.

== History ==
The United Arab Emirates indicated interest in placing an order for 150 vehicles at that trade show.

== Design ==
The four-wheeled vehicles are designed with a one-piece armored V-shaped bottom, so that the explosive force of enemy mines will be directed outwards, away from the vehicle's occupants. One model of the family is designed to serve as an armored personnel carrier, carrying seven soldiers, in addition to the vehicle's driver and commander/gunner.

The roof can mount a remote controlled weapon system, capable of controlling an automatic grenade launcher or machine gun. A paramilitary model will mount less-than-lethal weapons.

== Operators ==
- Burkina Faso
- Gabon
- Ivory Coast
- Mali
- Tajikistan
