= Wassim Nasr =

Lebanese journalist and analyst specialised in Islamic terrorism

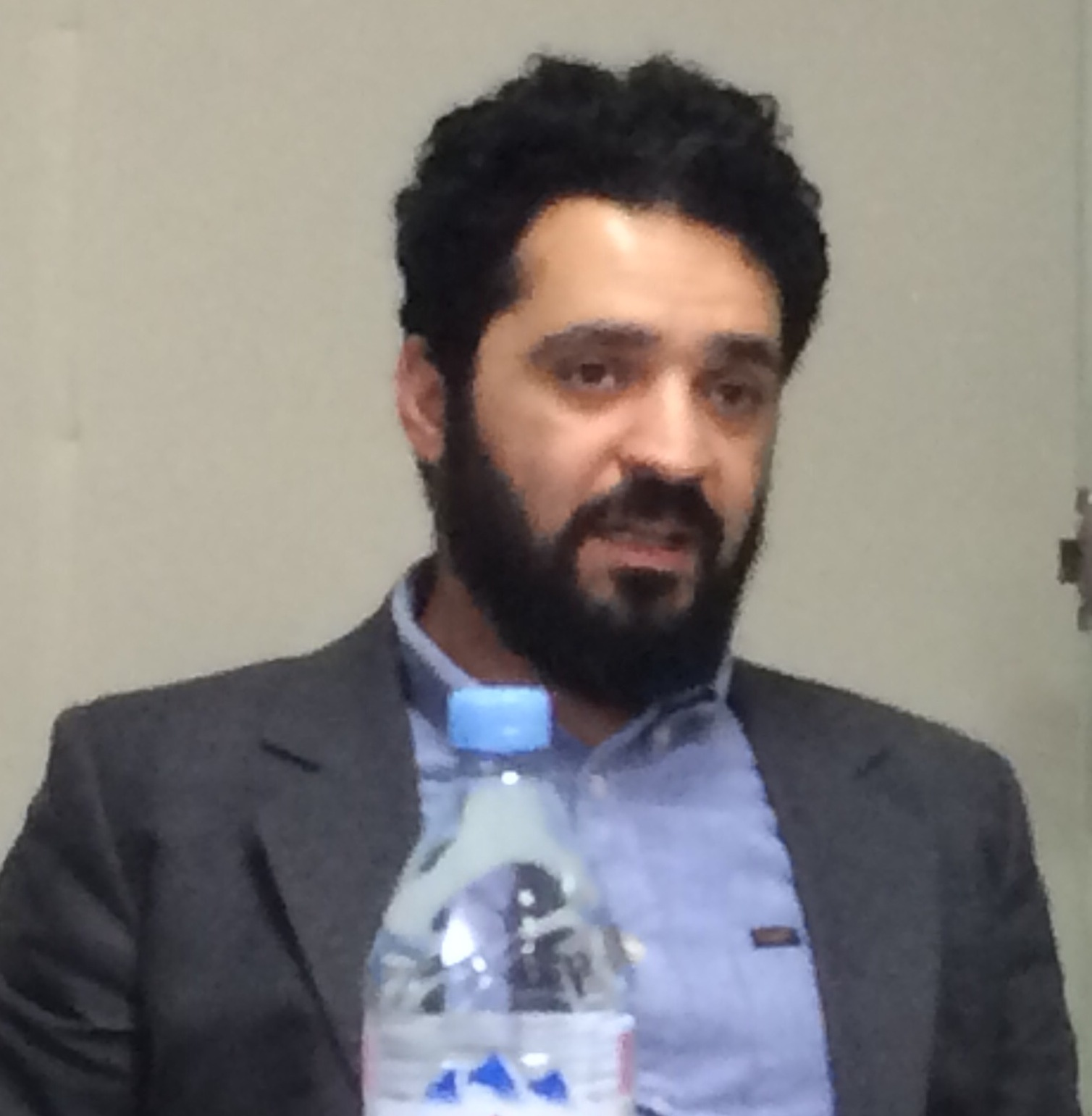
- Nasr in 2016
- Education: Institute for International Strategic Relations
- Occupations: Journalist, analyst
- Writing career
- Period: 2011-present
- Subjects: Jihadism in the Middle East and Sahel

Wassim Nasr is a Lebanese journalist and analyst specializing in jihadist movements and terrorism, and European, Middle Eastern, and African responses to them. He is a Senior Research Fellow at the Soufan Center.

== Education ==
As a child, Nasr lived through the Lebanese Civil War. He received a bachelor's degree in International Relations and a master's degree in Defense from the Institute for International and Strategic Relations in Paris, and a PhD from the same university.

== Career ==
In 2011, Nasr was hired at France 24 and worked at BFM TV from 2010 to 2012. As the only Arabic-speaking journalist at BFM, he was able to interview members of Muammar Gaddafi's forces and Libyan rebels during the Libyan civil war in 2011. He speaks French, English, and Arabic.

Nasr began researching the Islamic State and its rise, often interviewing militants and people fighting the jihadists using connections through Twitter and cross-checking them. In 2016, he published a book L'Etat Islamique: Fait Accompli (The Islamic State: Fait Accompli). Between 2020 and 2023, Nasr visited Hay'at Tahrir al-Sham-controlled areas of Idlib Governorate in Syria and spoke with top HTS leaders like Ahmed al-Sharaa and Abu Maria al-Qahtani. In 2024, Nasr conducted an interview with Amadou Koufa, the head of Katiba Macina and second-in-command of Jama'at Nusrat al-Islam wal-Muslimin. To date, it is Koufa's first interview with any Western news outlet.

Following Nasr's interview with Koufa, the governments of Burkina Faso, Mali, and Niger announced an investigation into Nasr for "publicizing and blatantly supporting terrorists in the Sahel." This investigation also came as a result of Nasr's statements claiming heavy losses for the Alliance of Sahel States (which the three countries compose) during the Bamako attacks and attacks on Djibo.
