= High Council for the Unity of Azawad =

Tuareg political movement

- Haut Conseil pour l'unité de l'Azawad
- Leaders: Alghabass Ag Intalla (2016–2024); Mohamed Ag Intalla (2013–2016); Intalla Ag Attaher (2013); Cheikh Ag Aoussa (until 2016); Achafghi Ag Bohada (2016–2024)
- Dates active: 2013 – November 30, 2024
- Active regions: Kidal Region
- Ideology: Azawadi nationalism, Islamism
- Part of: Coordination of Azawad Movements
- Wars: Mali War

The High Council for the Unity of Azawad (HCUA) (French: Haut Conseil pour l'unité de l'Azawad) was a Tuareg political movement formed on May 2, 2013, during the Mali War. The movement was initially called the High Council of Azawad (HCA) (French: Haut Conseil de l'Azawad) before changing its name on May 19, 2013.

== History ==
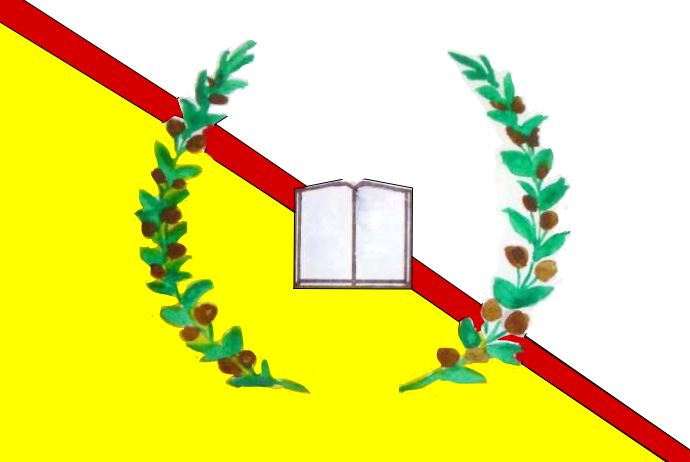
Flag of the High Council for the Unity of Azawad from 2014 to 2021.

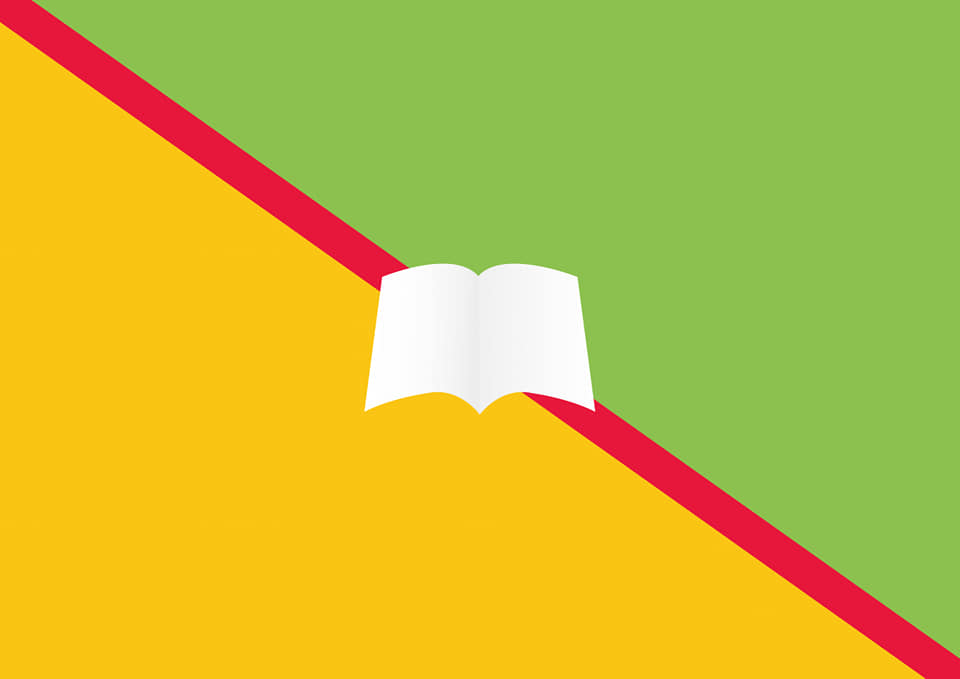
Flag of the HCUA since 2021.

The High Council of Azawad was created to promote talks between Tuareg rebels and the Malian government during the early stages of the Mali War. The council was formed by Mohamed Ag Intalla along with other Tuareg representatives who sought a peaceful resolution to the conflict. Ag Intalla called on the MNLA and the Azawad Islamic Movement (MIA) to join the HCA on the day of its creation. Ag Intalla stated that the HCA "will support all efforts to find through dialogue a negotiated political solution to the crisis that Azawad is going through." and that the movement was "a peaceful movement which does not demand the independence of a part of northern Mali and is against any idea of partition." He also stated the movement was for Malian unification, and against terrorism.

Ag Intalla received the support from his father, prominent Ifoghas Tuareg amenukal Intalla Ag Attaher, who had previously left the MNLA to join the HCA. Ag Intalla's brother, Alghabass Ag Intalla, declared the dissolution of the MIA and joined the HCUA on May 19 as well. That same day, the HCA met in Kidal, where Ag Attaher was appointed president of the HCA, and Mohammed was appointed secretary-general. The High Council of Azawad also rebranded to the High Council for the Unity of Azawad at the Kidal meeting.

The MNLA did not criticize the founding of the HCUA, and offered its support to the group. On June 2, 2013, the two groups signed a memorandum of understanding during the Ouagadougou Accords.

The military branch of the HCUA was led by Cheikh Ag Aoussa until October 8, 2016, when he was killed by a mine. Achafghi Ag Bohada succeeded him on October 25, 2016. Around the beginning of July 2015, Alghabass took over as secretary-general, leading a delegation of HCUA, MNLA, and MAA representatives at the Algiers Agreement. On November 30, 2024 the High Council of Azawad merged into the Azawad Liberation Front.

== Composition ==
The bulk of the HCUA is made of up Ifoghas Tuaregs and defectors from Ansar Dine. In a March 2016 report, MINUSMA estimated that HCUA had between 400 and 600 men.

== Deputies in the Malian parliament ==
During the 2013 Malian legislative elections, two members of HCUA were elected to the Malian parliament. Mohammed Ag Intalla was elected in Tin-Essako Cercle with 100% of the vote, although 86% were abstentions. Hamada Ag Bibi, the former spokesperson for Ansar Dine who later joined the MIA won 96.69% of the vote in Abeïbara Cercle, with 29% abstentions. Both Ag Bibi and Ag Intalla were under Rally for Mali.

== Actions ==
The HCUA participated in clashes in Takellote, Kidal Region in 2017 against the El Hadj Ag Gamou-led Imghad Tuareg Self-Defense Group and Allies. In 2019, the HCUA launched an operation dubbed Acharouchou to secure Kidal Region. This was extended to Tombouctou Region later on. Calm was observed in the regions under HCUA control. In 2023, the HCUA participated in an attack on Malian forces in Taoussa.

== Alleged ties to JNIM and ISGS ==
In June 2016, French minister of defense Jean-Yves Le Drian criticized the HCUA's "double game", accusing the group of still having ties to Ansar Dine and Iyad Ag Ghaly. The HCUA rebutted these statements, claiming to have broken ties with Ansar Dine.

In an August 8, 2018 report, the United Nations accused Salah Ag Ahmed, mayor of Talataye and a member of HCUA, of being a double agent for Ansar Dine and the Islamic State in the Greater Sahara. Another HCUA member, Mahamadou Ag Rhissa, was accused of migrant smuggling and detaining and sexually exploiting women in Talahandak, Kidal region. Siguidi Ag Madit, an HCUA commander, was also accused of having ties to the Islamic State and being involved with an attack against GATIA in Andéramboukane. On December 20, 2018, Ag Rhissa was sanctioned, and banned from travelling outside of Mali.

In September 2019, Niger accused the HCUA of participating in the Midal attack, the Baley Beri ambush, and the Inates attack. The HCUA denied all accusations.

Despite accusations of ties to jihadist movements, HCUA has been the target of jihadist attacks. The most notable attack occurred in Ber on June 20, 2016, when Alassane Ag Intouwa, an HCUA official, was assassinated by AQIM.
