= Algiers Accords (2015) =

2015 agreement

Accord for Peace and Reconciliation in Mali
- Signed: May 15 and June 20, 2015
- Location: Bamako, Mali and Algiers, Algeria
- Expiry: January 25, 2024 (terminated)
- Mediators: Algeria
- Signatories: Mali; Coordination of Azawad Movements

The Algiers Accords, officially referred to as the Accord for Peace and Reconciliation in Mali, is a 2015 agreement to end the Mali War. The agreement was signed on May 15 and June 20, 2015, in Bamako, following negotiations in Algiers between the Republic of Mali and Coordination of Azawad Movements (CMA). The agreement was eventually terminated by the Malian government on January 25, 2024, amid open conflict with the CMA that sprung from the withdrawal of MINUSMA peacekeepers and presence of Wagner Group forces.

== Background ==
In 2012, Mali experienced a deep political and security crisis due to the insurgency in its northern regions. A military coup in Bamako and the rise of armed Tuareg groups, such as the National Movement for the Liberation of Azawad (MNLA) and jihadist elements, destabilised the region further. By 2013, the Malian government, supported by French forces under Operation Serval, as well as troops from Chad and other African nations, managed to recapture much of the north from jihadist control. However, the MNLA had taken advantage of the power vacuum left by retreating jihadists to regain control over key cities in northern Mali, particularly Kidal, a strategic town in the region of Azawad.

In this context, tensions escalated between the MNLA and the Malian government over control of Kidal and the organisation of the upcoming presidential elections. While initially refusing to allow elections in Kidal, the MNLA eventually agreed to permit them in July 2013, provided that United Nations troops secured the voting process across Azawad. The Malian government, however, insisted that its own military forces must be present in Kidal to oversee security, which led to further friction between the two parties.

By June 2013, tensions boiled over when the MNLA arrested 180 individuals in Kidal, accusing them of being Malian spies or infiltrators. Accusations of violence, pillaging, and ethnic targeting by the MNLA against black populations such as the Songhai, Peulh, and Bella people, were made. In response, the Malian army mobilised and launched an offensive, recapturing Anéfis after clashes with the MNLA on June 4, 2013. Amid fears of escalation, the French military intervened to de-escalate tensions and prevent further clashes in the lead-up to the presidential elections.

=== The Ouagadougou Accords (2013) ===
To prevent further violence and enable peaceful elections, mediation efforts led by Burkina Faso's President Blaise Compaoré began on June 6, 2013. After 11 days of intense negotiations, an agreement was reached, and the Ouagadougou Accords were signed on June 18, 2013. The signatories included the Malian government, represented by the Minister of Territorial Administration, Colonel Moussa Sinko Coulibaly, and the leadership of the MNLA and the High Council for the Unity of Azawad (HCUA).

Key provisions of the agreement included:

- An immediate ceasefire.
- The withdrawal of MNLA and HCUA forces to designated cantonment sites, primarily around Kidal.
- The deployment of the Malian army to Kidal to secure the elections.
- The formation of a joint commission, comprising the Malian army, rebel groups, French forces, and the United Nations Multidimensional Integrated Stabilization Mission in Mali (MINUSMA), to oversee the implementation of security measures.
- The inclusion of the term "Azawad" in the agreement, despite opposition from Bamako.

Although the Malian government initially demanded the disarmament of the MNLA, this condition was waived in exchange for the rebels allowing the Malian army back into Kidal. Furthermore, the MNLA and HCUA did not secure an amnesty for their leaders, many of whom remained under international arrest warrants.

=== Challenges and Tensions Following the Accord ===
Despite the agreements reached, tensions persisted. While the MNLA adhered to its commitment to not disrupt the presidential elections, sporadic violence continued in Kidal and surrounding areas. On July 18, 2013, clashes broke out between pro-Mali and pro-Azawad demonstrators. Further unrest followed after Ibrahim Boubacar Keïta was elected President of Mali in August 2013, with new confrontations emerging between the MNLA and Malian forces.

Although the Ouagadougou Accords paved the way for the elections, they failed to resolve the deeper issues of political and territorial control. Negotiations on the long-term status of northern Mali, particularly regarding the autonomy of the Azawad region, stalled. The Malian government, led by President Keïta, resisted discussions on granting autonomy to the Tuareg-majority regions, contributing to a growing sense of frustration among northern factions.

By September 2013, the MNLA accused the Malian government of failing to honour its commitments under the Ouagadougou Accords, particularly regarding the cantoning of rebel fighters and the release of prisoners. This led to a suspension of negotiations by the MNLA, HCUA, and the Arab Movement of Azawad (MAA) by the end of the month. Clashes continued sporadically throughout late 2013, with further incidents in Ménaka and Kidal in November.

In January 2014, Algeria attempted to broker a new round of negotiations. Although some progress was made, the MNLA and its allies remained sceptical of the Malian government's intentions. The lack of a clear path to resolving the autonomy question and the continuing incidents of violence laid the groundwork for the subsequent resurgence of conflict in 2014, culminating in the escalation of hostilities during the Kidal crisis in May 2014.

Fighting broke out in Kidal between May 17 and 21, 2014. The Malian army was defeated, and subsequently lost control of Ménaka, Andéramboukane, Anefif, and Kidal. Negotiations restarted in Kidal at the behest of the Malian government on May 22, and were mediated by Mauritanian and AU president Mohamed Ould Abdel Aziz. The negotiations ended with a return to the stipulations of the Ouagadougou Accords. However, Tuareg separatists remained in control of Kidal and Menaka.

== Accords ==
On February 19, 2015, representatives from the Malian government and the Coordination of Azawad Movements (CMA) agreed upon a new document, including the cessation of hostilities, as negotiations to end the broader war continued in Algiers. On March 1, a mediation agreement was proposed by Algeria, which was accepted by Mali and pro-government militias. The CMA asked for some time to consider the agreement, as there were no propositions for autonomy or federalism for northern Mali, which angered a large portion of Tuareg rebels. The CMA announced their refusal to sign the agreement on April 10.

On April 27, the pro-government GATIA and Arab Movement of Azawad (MAA) captured Menaka, initiating new clashes between Tuareg rebels and the pro-government militias. On May 10, the CMA initialized the agreement, but did not sign the text. The peace agreement was signed on May 15 in Bamako by the Malian government, representatives of pro-government militias, and representatives from Algeria, Burkina Faso, Mauritania, Niger, Nigeria, Chad, the African Union, the United Nations, ECOWAS, the Organisation of Islamic Cooperation, the European Union, and France. No CMA representatives were present for the signing on May 15. That same day, fighting broke out near Menaka.

Under pressure from international organizations, the CMA finally signed the agreement in Bamako on June 20. The CMA's representative was Sidi Brahim Ould Sidati, a leader of the MAA.

== Implementation ==
The Carter Center, who was appointed as the independent observer of the agreement's implementations in 2017, stated that 22% of the accords' provisions were put into effect by 2017, and by 2020, that number had only increased to 23%. While the Malian Army was dispatched to Kidal as per the terms of the agreement, the troops never actually patrolled the city. Similarly, CMA fighters were sent to Gao under similar provisions.

Part of the reason for the lack of implementation was the need for more willingness by the signatories to honor it. A March 2020 survey showed slightly over eighty percent of Malian civilians had little to no knowledge of the peace agreement. The CMA continued to exercise de facto control over the Kidal region, which the Malian government tolerated as Malian government control of the region would force the government to enact constitutional reforms upending the status quo.

=== International Actors' Involvement ===
The international community played a significant role in brokering and overseeing the Algiers Peace Accords. Algeria, as the lead mediator, had considerable influence due to its geographical proximity and historical engagement in Mali's conflicts. The mediation process also involved various international entities, including the United Nations, France, the African Union, the European Union, ECOWAS, and the United States.

Despite this broad international support, the mediation faced criticism for failing to adequately address core issues at the heart of the conflict. For example, Algeria’s role as a mediator was often seen as controversial due to its long-standing political and military influence in northern Mali. Additionally, many accused Algeria of partiality, given the close ties between the Coordination of Azawad Movements (CMA) and Algerian officials. Some CMA leaders even held dual citizenship.

International actors, such as the United Nations and France, also came under scrutiny for prioritising counterterrorism operations, notably through France’s Operation Barkhane, rather than focusing on the political aspects of the accord. This imbalance caused friction between the peace process and efforts to combat jihadist groups in the region.

=== Consequences on Regional Stability ===
The Accords had far-reaching implications for the broader Sahel region, although the agreement's limited implementation failed to bring long-term stability. Northern Mali, despite the peace deal, remained volatile due to a combination of inter-ethnic tensions and the rise of jihadist groups, including the Islamic State in the Greater Sahara (ISGS) and affiliates of al-Qaeda.

The incomplete implementation of the accords, particularly the failure to effectively decentralise power and integrate former rebels into the national army, created a vacuum in governance. This allowed jihadist factions to expand their operations not only in Mali but also in neighbouring Niger and Burkina Faso. Moreover, ongoing disputes over local governance and the distribution of resources led to further fragmentation among signatories of the accord.

The Sahel's security situation worsened as international forces, including the United Nations Multidimensional Integrated Stabilization Mission in Mali (MINUSMA), were stretched thin. By 2023, MINUSMA had been pushed out of Mali following deteriorating relations between the transitional government in Bamako and international actors.

=== Critiques and Limitations of the Agreement ===
The Algiers Peace Accords have been subject to substantial criticism from various stakeholders, including the Malian government, CMA, and international observers. One major critique centres on the lack of inclusivity in the agreement. The accord primarily focused on the interests of armed groups involved in the conflict, neglecting the concerns of sedentary populations. This exclusion has led to ongoing resentment and contributed to the formation of new militia groups, which further destabilised northern Mali.

Another significant critique is that the accord inadvertently rewarded rebellion. By offering political and military concessions to groups that had taken up arms against the state, the peace process was seen by many in Mali as a capitulation. This perception fuelled the belief that future uprisings could extract similar concessions from the government.

Additionally, the agreement's failure to address key economic drivers of the conflict, such as drug and arms trafficking, has been a notable shortcoming. Some signatories to the accord have been accused of continuing to engage in illicit trade, which undermines the peace process and fosters further instability.

== Nullification ==
Tensions arose between the Malian government and the Permanent Strategic Framework for Peace, Security, and Development (CSP-PSD), a coalition of the CMA and pro-government militias, in August 2023 following the Malian government and allied Wagner Group's atrocities against civilians. The conflict culminated on August 11, 2023, when CSP-PSD fighters clashed with Mali and Wagner over control of the former MINUSMA base in Ber, which MINUSMA hadn't even finished evacuating. This conflict spiraled into a war between the CSP-PSD and the Malian government, and the nullification of the Algiers Agreement.

The Malian government announced its withdrawal from the agreement on January 25, 2024. The government cited the failure of other parties, including Algeria, to uphold the terms of the agreement. Mali's transitional government also accused Algeria of "unfriendly acts" and instrumentalising the accord for its own interests. The Malian authorities further alleged that certain groups, formerly involved in the peace process, had transformed into "terrorist actors" with ties to Algeria.

== See also ==
- Algiers Accords (2006)
