= Léré, Mali =

Léré
- Commune and town
- Location in Mali
- Coordinates: 15°42′55″N 4°54′15″W
- Country: Mali
- Region: Tombouctou Region
- Cercle: Niafunké Cercle

Area
  - Total: 1,342 km^{2} (518 sq mi)
- Elevation: 266 m (873 ft)

Population (2009 census)
  - Total: 16,072
  - Density: 11.98/km^{2} (31.02/sq mi)
- Time zone: UTC+0 (GMT)

Léré is a small town and rural commune of the Cercle of Niafunké in the Tombouctou Region of Mali. The commune covers an area of approximately 1,342 square kilometers and contains the town and 18 villages. In the 2009 census the commune had a population of 16,072.

The town is around 60 km east of the Mauritanian border. A weekly market is held in the town on Fridays that attracts people from the surrounding settlements.

Léré was allegedly captured by Tuareg rebels in September 2023 durning battle against Mali army.
