= Kidal =

Kidal ⴾⴸⵍ
- Commune and town
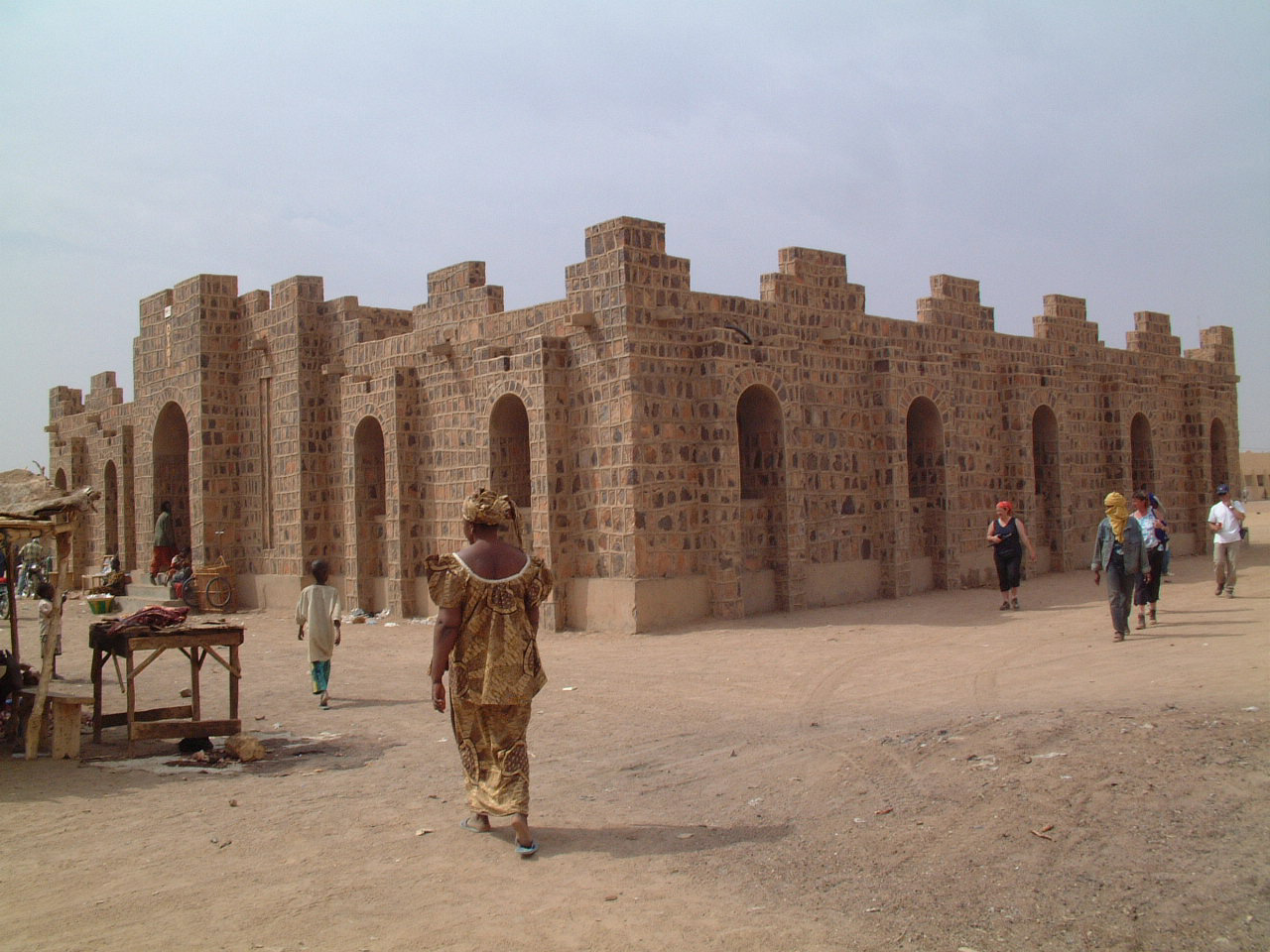
- A craftsmen's house

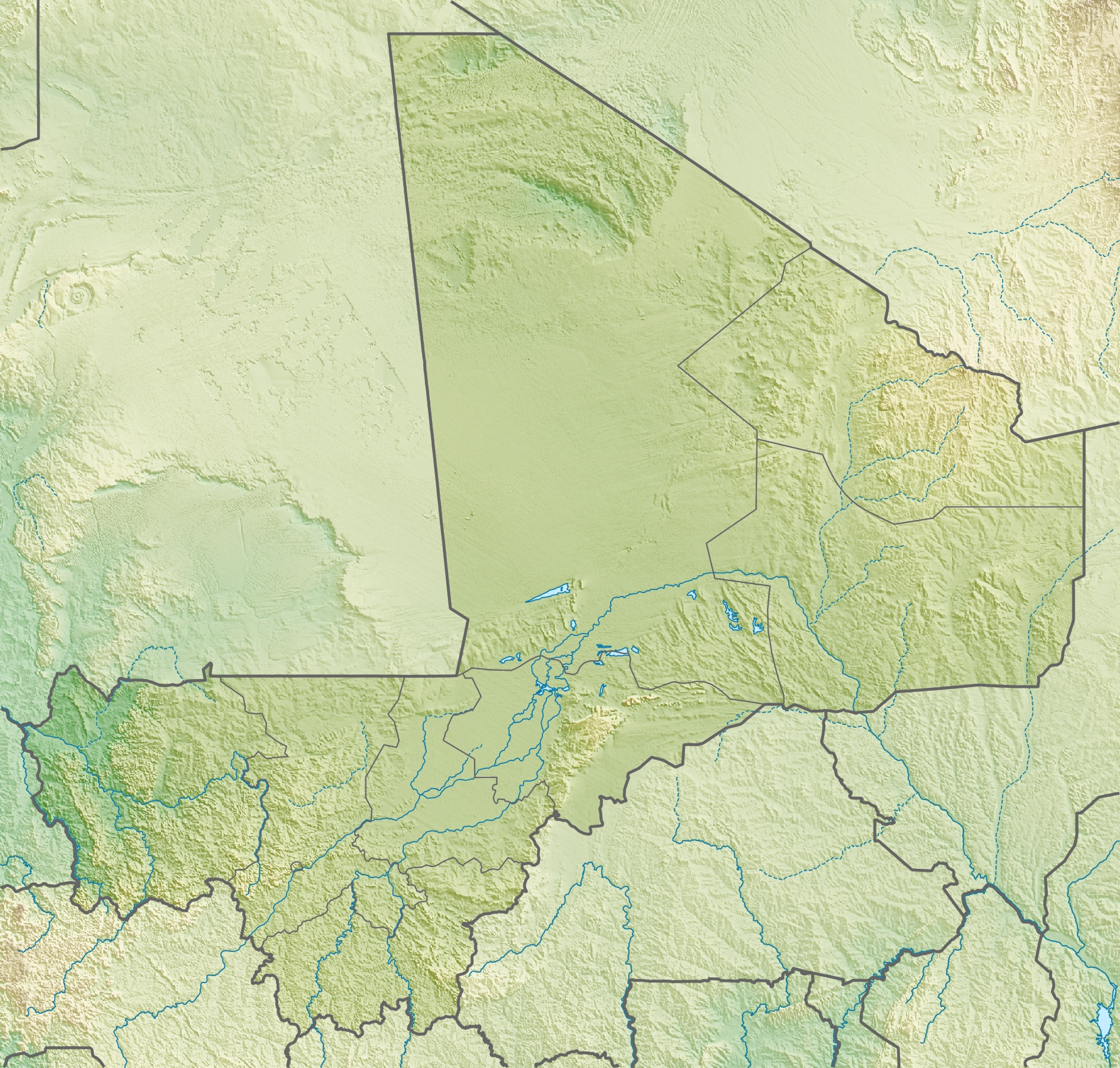
- Location in Mali
- Coordinates: 18°26′20″N 1°24′30″E
- Country: Mali
- Region: Kidal Region
- Cercle (district): Kidal Cercle

Area
  - Total: 9,913 km^{2} (3,827 sq mi)
- Elevation: 463 m (1,519 ft)

Population (2009)
  - Total: 25,617
  - Density: 2.584/km^{2} (6.693/sq mi)
- Time zone: UTC+00:00 (GMT)

Kidal (Note: Tuareg Berber: ⴾⴸⵍ, KDL, Kidal) is a town and commune in the desert region of northern Mali. The town lies 285 km (177 mi) northeast of Gao and is the capital of the Kidal Cercle and the Kidal Region. The commune has an area of about 9,910 km^{2} (3,830 sq mi) and includes the town of Kidal and 31 other settlements.

== History ==
The Kidal region has been inhabited by the Tuareg for centuries. The modern town grew up around a French military post established in the early 20th century.

On 30 March 2012, Kidal and its military base were captured by the National Movement for the Liberation of Azawad as part of the Tuareg rebellion for the independence of Azawad. A spokesman for the Malian military junta said "To preserve the life of the people of Kidal, the military command decided not to prolong the battle". Gao and Timbuktu were captured within the next 48 hours, and on 6 April, the National Movement for the Liberation of Azawad declared the independence of Azawad from Mali. In the course of the conflict the MNLA lost their control to Islamist militias. On 30 January 2013 French and Malian forces moved into the town to bring it back under government control.

On 14 December 2013, a car bombing in Kidal killed two United Nations peacekeepers.

On 21 May 2014, MNLA forced government troops in Kidal to retreat after heavy fighting, capturing the military base.

On 13 February 2020, Mali government forces were sent to Kidal for the first time in six years. In late 2023, the ruling junta carried out an offensive along with Wagner Group fighters. They managed to bring the city back under government control in the Battle of Kidal in November 2023.

In April 2026, the Azawad Liberation Front launched an assault on the city as part of a coordinated offensive across the country. The rebels later reported that they had captured the city and posted a video of rebels in the governor's residence. They later withdrew from the town on 6 October after a counteroffensive operation by the Malian army.

== Demographics ==
=== Historical population ===
Historical population
Year	Pop.	±% p.a.
1998	11,159	—
2009	25,969	+7.98%

The population of the city of Kidal has grown from 11,159 in 1998 to 25,969 in 2009, raising its percentage in the Kidal Region from 26.3% to 38.3%.

=== Languages ===
Languages in Kidal City (2009 Census)
Languages	percent
Tamasheq	79.13%
Songhai	7.18%
Bambara	5.51%
Arabic	3.78%
Other	4.4%

Kidal city is mainly Tamasheq speaking with 79.13% of the city speaking it in 2009. The second most spoken language in Kidal city is Songhai with 7.18% of the city speaking it. Other minority languages include Bambara spoken by 5.51% of the city, Arabic spoken by 3.78% of the city, and other minority languages spoken by 4.4%.

== Notable inhabitants ==
- Ahmed Ag Kaedy (born 1979) – musician
- Nina Wallet Intalou (born 1963) – businesswoman and politician

== Climate ==
Köppen-Geiger climate classification system classifies it climate as hot desert (BWh), with extremely hot weather most of the year.

Climate data for Kidal (1950–2000)
Month	Jan	Feb	Mar	Apr	May	Jun	Jul	Aug	Sep	Oct	Nov	Dec	Year
Mean daily maximum °C (°F)	28.0 (82.4)	31.1 (88.0)	34.8 (94.6)	38.8 (101.8)	41.5 (106.7)	41.9 (107.4)	39.9 (103.8)	38.4 (101.1)	39.1 (102.4)	38.0 (100.4)	33.4 (92.1)	28.9 (84.0)	36.2 (97.2)
Mean daily minimum °C (°F)	12.5 (54.5)	14.8 (58.6)	18.7 (65.7)	23.0 (73.4)	27.0 (80.6)	28.6 (83.5)	27.2 (81.0)	26.2 (79.2)	26.0 (78.8)	23.2 (73.8)	18.0 (64.4)	13.7 (56.7)	21.6 (70.9)
Average rainfall mm (inches)	0.6 (0.02)	0.1 (0.00)	0.2 (0.01)	1.0 (0.04)	5.3 (0.21)	11.6 (0.46)	36.8 (1.45)	45.9 (1.81)	23.1 (0.91)	3.0 (0.12)	0.2 (0.01)	0.2 (0.01)	128.0 (5.04)
Average rainy days (≥ 0.1 mm)	0.2	0.1	0.2	0.2	1.0	3.0	6.1	6.9	3.9	0.6	0.1	0.3	22.6
Mean monthly sunshine hours	274.5	267.3	286.1	283.9	294.0	230.8	269.8	276.9	271.6	296.4	286.6	275.5	3,313.4
Source 1: World Meteorological Organization
Source 2: NOAA (sun 1961–1990)

== Gallery ==
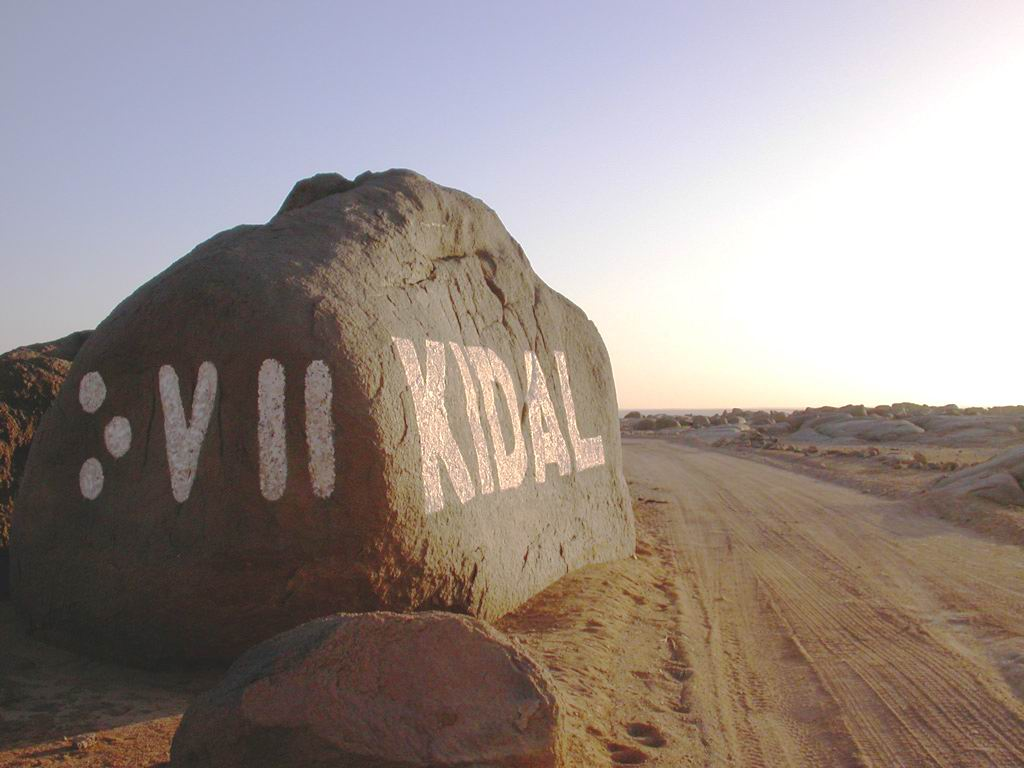
Entry to the town

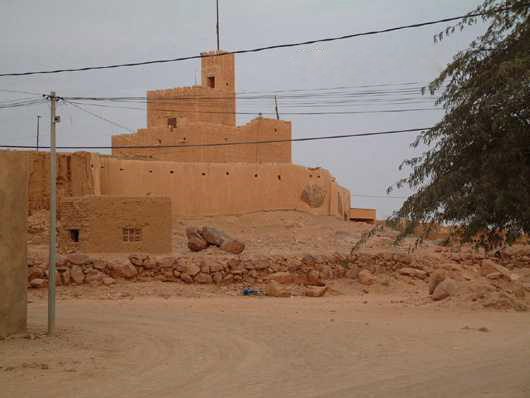
French colonial fortress at Kidal
