= Regions of Mali =

Since 2016, Mali has been divided into ten regions and one capital district. A reorganization of the country from eight to nineteen regions was passed into law in 2012, but of the new regions, only Taoudénit (partitioned from Tombouctou Region) and Ménaka (formerly Ménaka Cercle in Gao Region) have begun to be implemented. Each of the regions bears the name of its capital. The regions are divided into 56 cercles. The cercles and the capital district are divided into 703 communes.

In 2023, Mali has added nine new regions to its administrative structure, bringing the total to 19 regions plus the district of Bamako. This reorganization aims to improve governance and bring public services closer to local populations. This initiative continues the decentralization efforts that began with the creation of the Taoudénit and Ménaka regions in 2016. The nineteen regions in turn are subdivided into 159 cercles, 466 districts, 819 communes and 12.712 villages

== Demographics ==
The most populated region in 2023 is Ségou with 2.455 million people, and the least populated is Kidal with just 83 thousand people.

== Geography ==
Though five regions are composed of mainly desert, they also have half the country's land mass. The largest region is Taoudénit and the smallest is Dioila, excluding Bamako.

== Regions ==
The regions are numbered, originally west to east, with Roman numerals. The numbers were fixed by order in 1977. The numbering after 2023 is stipulated by law 2023-006 and 2023-007 The capital Bamako is administered separately and is in its own district. The regions and the Bamako District are listed below. The population figures are from the 1998 and 2009 censuses.

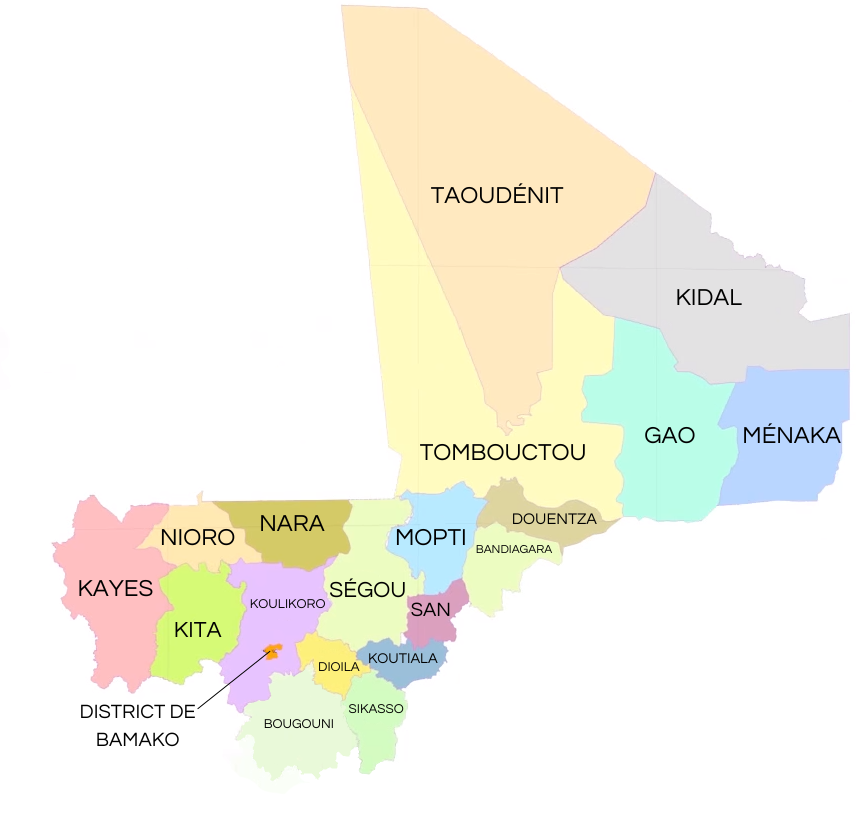
Regions of Mali since 2023

Region name	Region number	Area (km^{2})	Population Census 1998	Population Census 2009	Population (2023)
Bamako - Capital District	00	252	1,016,296	1,810,366	4,227,569
Kayes	01	63,210	1,374,316	1,993,615	1,840,329
Koulikoro	02	47,040	1,570,507	2,422,108	2,255,157
Sikasso	03	20,800	1,782,157	2,643,179	1,533,123
Ségou	04	52,100	1,675,357	2,338,349	2,455,263
Mopti	05	26,550	1,484,601	2,036,209	935,579
Tombouctou	06	206,000	442,619	674,793	974,278
Gao	07	94,846	341,542	542,304	727,517
Kidal	08	151,430	38,774	67,739	83,192
Taoudénit	09	292,000	–	18,160	100,358
Ménaka	10	78,100	–	54,456	318,876
Bougouni	15	15,964	–	–	1,570,979
Dioila	13	12,330	–	–	675,965
Nioro	11	23,350	–	–	678,061
Koutiala	16	14,600	–	–	1,169,882
Kita	12	35,680	–	–	681,671
Nara	14	31,250	–	–	307,777
Bandiagara	19	24,850	–	–	868,916
San	17	14,200	–	–	820,807
Douentza	18	23,310	–	–	446,179

== See also ==
- List of regions of Mali by Human Development Index
- Cercles of Mali
- ISO 3166-2:ML
