= Kidal Region =

Region of Mali

- Region
- Interactive map of Kidal Region
- Coordinates: 19°58′24″N 0°44′49″E
- Country: Mali
- Capital: Kidal

Government
  - Governor: El Hadj Ag Gamou

Area
  - Total: 151,450 km^{2} (58,480 sq mi)

Population (2023)
  - Total: 83,192
  - Density: 0.54930/km^{2} (1.4227/sq mi)
- Time zone: UTC±0 (UTC)
- ISO 3166 code: ML-8
- HDI (2017): 0.386 low · 5th

Kidal Region (Bambara: ߞߌߘߊߟ ߘߌߣߋߖߊ tr. Kidal Dineja) the eighth administrative region of Mali, covering 151,450 square kilometres or 58,480 square miles. This area was formerly part of Gao Region, but was created as a separate region in 1991. It is located in the north of the country. It was under the control of different armed movements such as the Ansar Dine and MNLA until January 2013, when French forces liberated the region. The Region's administrative capital is the town of Kidal.

== Geography ==
The region is bordered on the west by Taoudénit Region, to the south by Gao Region and Ménaka Region, to the east by Niger and to the north by Algeria.

Kidal has a desert climate with day-time temperatures that reach as high as 45 °C (113 °F).

In 2009 the region had a population of 67,638. In addition 30% of its population, mostly Tuareg and Songhai were displaced to North Africa during the 1990s.

The largest towns of the region are Kidal, Tessalit, and Aguel'hoc.

== Transportation and economy ==
The primary trades of Kidal Region include livestock breeding, craft-making, and commerce. Commercial farming has been developed in some areas. The region is extremely isolated, with no paved highways or rivers for transportation.

== History ==
The region saw Tuareg Rebellions in 1963–1964 and in 1990–1991. The accords of Tamanresset followed on January 6, 1991, creating the Kidal Region by decree on August 8, 1991. In 1990, there were approximately five schools in the Kidal region, including one in Aguelhoc, one in Tin Essako, and one in Tessalit. In 1991, tuareg insurgents demanded more investments in Nortnern Mali. After Tamanresset accords, situation changhed and Kidal Region received support from government.

By the end of 2011, another group of Tuareg rebels, the National Movement for the Liberation of Azawad, were active in the region. The Movement declared Azawad to be an independent republic in April 2012, with the Kidal region as part of the new (but unrecognised) state.

== Culture ==
The region is peopled primarily by Tuaregs, a nomadic ethnicity of Berber origin. Their writing is the Tifinagh alphabet.

Though nomadism remains the lifestyle best adapted to the difficult environment of the region, several settlements have emerged at Kidal: Aguel'hoc, Tessalit, and Tinzawatène.

== Demographics ==
The Ménaka Region is the least populated region in Mali, with a population of 83,192 in 2022.

=== Ethnicity ===
Ethnicity in Kidal (2022)
1. Tuareg (86.2%)
2. Arab (5.88%)
3. Bambara (5.54%)
4. Songhai (1.38%)
5. Other (1.02%)
Mother tongues in Kidal region (2022)
1. Tuareg (82.9%)
2. Arabic (6.83%)
3. Bambara (6.45%)
4. Maraka / Soninké (1.52%)
5. Songhai (1.40%)
6. Other Malian (0.75%)
7. Other African (0.01%)
8. Other foreign (0.11%)

Kidal is one of three Malian regions (the others being Menaka and Tombouctou) where the Tuareg constitute the single largest ethnic group. In 2022, Tuareg people accounted for over 86% of the regional population. Minorities in Kidal include the Songhai, Arabs (Maure), Bambara, Senufo (mostly Minyanka), and Somono.

=== Religion ===
The 2022 census found that 99.64% of the population in Kidal was Muslim, 0.29% was Christian, 0.01 were adherents of traditional faiths, and 0.04% practised other religions. Islam is the dominant religion among the Tuareg, who are almost entirely Muslim.

== Administrative subdivisions ==
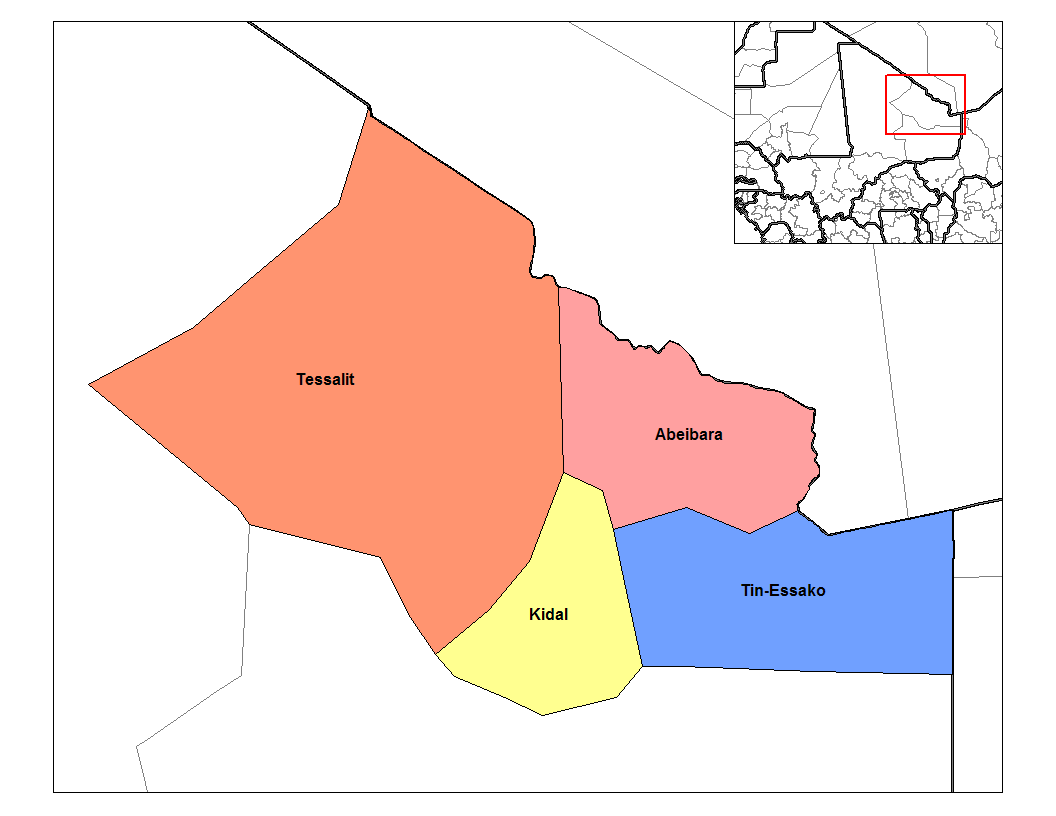
Cercles of the Kidal Region

As of 2023, the Kidal Region is divided into five cercles encompassing 11 communes: A fifth cercle, Achibogo, was added sometime after 2016. No map is available depicting the new cercle divisions.

Cercle name	Area (km^{2})	Population Census 1998	Population Census 2009
Kidal	21,353	16,495	33,087
Tessalit	39,000	12,362	16,289
Abeïbara	23,750	7,363	10,286
Tin-Essako		2,554	7,976

== See also ==
- Cercles of Mali
- Regions of Mali
