= Ber, Mali =

Ber
- Commune and village
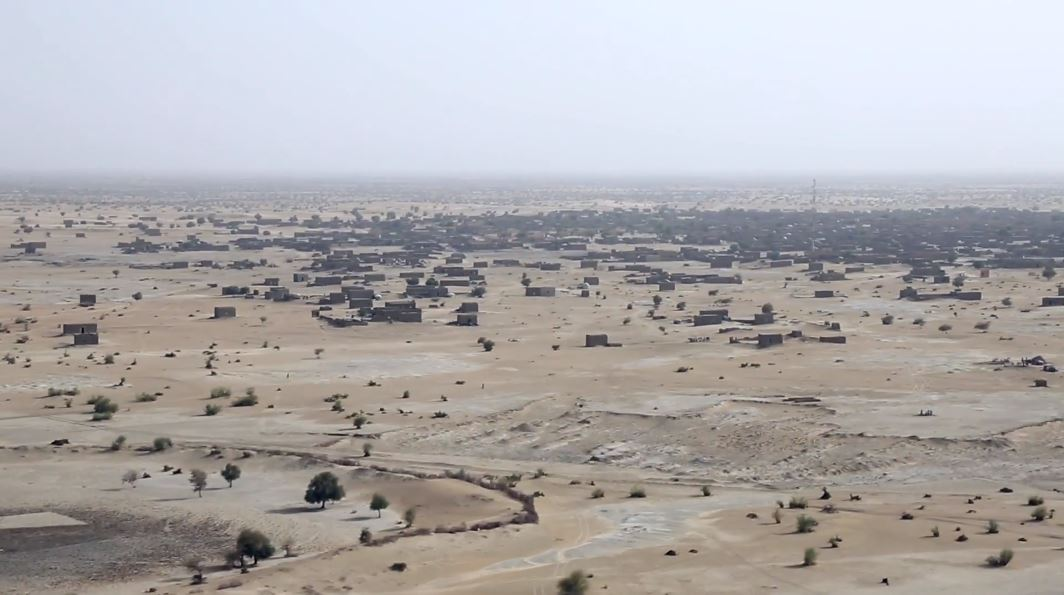

- Location in Mali
- Coordinates: 16°50′24″N 2°31′29″W
- Country: Mali
- Region: Tombouctou Region
- Cercle: Timbuktu Cercle

Government
  - Control: Azawad Liberation Front; Jama'at Nusrat al-Islam wal-Muslimin

Area
  - Total: 35,280 km^{2} (13,620 sq mi)

Population (2009)
  - Total: 9,536
- Time zone: UTC+0 (GMT)

Ber is a village and commune of the Cercle of Timbuktu in the Tombouctou Region of Mali. The village lies 8 km north of the Niger River and 53 km east of Timbuktu. In the 2009 census the commune had a population of 9,128. The commune is mainly sand dunes and extends for 35,280 km^{2}.

The village was captured by Azawad Liberation Front and JNIM during the 2026 Mali offensives.
