= Toma Department =

Coordinates: 12°46′12″N 2°51′28″W

Toma
- Department
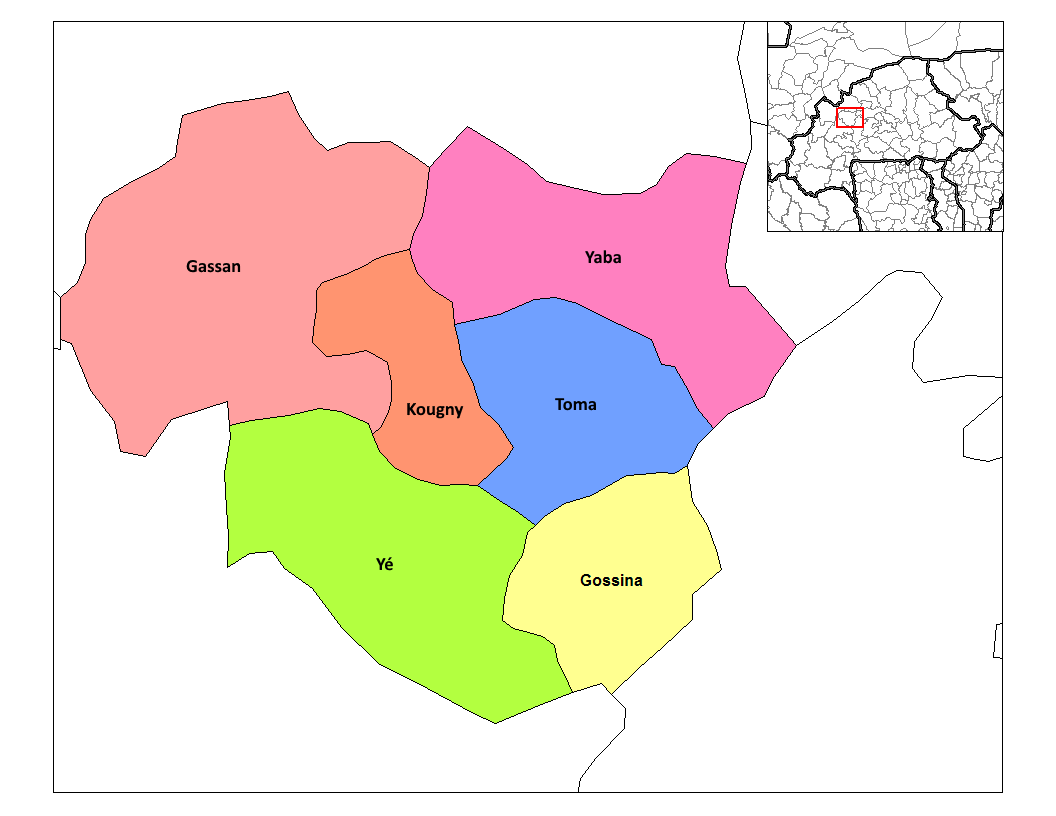
- Toma Department location in the province
- Country: Burkina Faso
- Province: Nayala Province

Area
  - Department: 169 sq mi (438 km^{2})

Population (2019 census)
  - Department: 39,109
  - Density: 231/sq mi (89.3/km^{2})
  - Urban: 15,851
- Time zone: UTC+0 (GMT 0)

Toma is a department or commune of Nayala Province in western Burkina Faso. Its capital is the town of Toma. According to the 2019 census the department has a total population of 39,109.

== Towns and villages ==
- Toma (15,851 inhabitants) (capital)
- Goa (651 inhabitants)
- Goussi (516 inhabitants)
- Koin (3,330 inhabitants)
- Kolan (955 inhabitants)
- Konti (345 inhabitants)
- Niémé (650 inhabitants)
- Nyon (551 inhabitants)
- Pankélé (1,934 inhabitants)
- Raotenga (242 inhabitants)
- Sawa (848 inhabitants)
- Semba (531 inhabitants)
- Sien (707 inhabitants)
- Siépa (730 inhabitants)
- Tô (1,354 inhabitants)
- Yayo (175 inhabitants)
- Zouma (2,964 inhabitants)
