= Gao (disambiguation) =

Gao is a city in Mali and the capital of Gao Region.

Gao or GAO may also refer to:

== Places ==
- Gao (department), a commune of Ziro Province, Burkina Faso
- Gao County, in Sichuan, People's Republic of China
- Gao, a village in Poyang County, Jiangxi Province, People's Republic of China
- Gao, Iran
- Gao Empire, ancient state in Mali
- Gao Region, a region of Mali, whose capital city is Gao
  - Gao Cercle, an administrative subdivision of Gao Region, whose administrative center is Gao

== Languages ==
- Gao language, spoken in the Solomon Islands
- Gao dialect of the Koyraboro Senni Songhay language spoken in Mali
- Gao-Yang Yue, spoken in the southwestern Guangdong, China

== Battles ==
- Battle of Gao, the first of several battles in June 2012, during the ongoing Mali war that began on 16 January 2012
- Second Battle of Gao, the recapture of the city in January 2013
- Third Battle of Gao, on 9–11 February 2013
- Fourth Battle of Gao, on 20–22 February 2013
- Fifth Battle of Gao, in March 2013

== Other uses ==
- Laccosperma secundiflorum, a species of tropical palm tree
- Gao, the Hausa name of Faidherbia albida, an economically important species of tree found in Africa and the Middle East,
- Gao (mansa), Mansa of the Mali Empire 1300–1305
- Gao (surname) (高), a Chinese family name
- Gao-Guenie, a meteorite that fell in 1960 in Burkina Faso
- Government Accountability Office (GAO), the audit, evaluation, and investigative arm of the United States Congress
- Gao, a character in the manga Phoenix
- Gao Gao, a giant panda
- Gao Village, fictitious village featured in the classic Chinese novel Journey to the West

== See also ==
- Gaos (disambiguation)
- Gaon (disambiguation)
- Goa (disambiguation)
- Nian gao
- Qau language (also named Gao Gelao)
