= Goa (disambiguation) =

Goa is a state in India.

Goa or GOA may also refer to:

== Places ==
- Goa, Botswana, a small town in Botswana, near the Namibian border, near the Caprivi Strip
- Goa, Camarines Sur, a municipality in the Philippines
- Goah, Pakistan, a village in Punjab Pakistan
- Sultanate of Gowa, a kingdom in the South Sulawesi region of what is now Indonesia
- Goa-eup, a town in Gumi, North Gyeongsang, South Korea
- Goa, Burkina Faso
- Related to the state of Goa in India
  - Portuguese Goa, Portuguese possession, the name was often used for the whole of Portuguese India
  - Goa, Daman and Diu, a short lived Indian Union Territory
  - Ilhas de Goa (also known as Tiswadi), a sub-district within Goa
  - Goa (island) (Ilha de Goa), an island in Nampula, Mozambique.
  - Nova Goa (also known as Panjim or Panaji), the current capital of the state of Goa
  - Velha Goa (also known as Old Goa), the former capital city of Portuguese India
  - Goa Velha, a village on the island of Goa, which was once a suburb of the former capital

== Abbreviations ==
- Gates of Agony, a professional wrestling tag team
- Gene ontology Annotation, the practice of capturing data about a gene product
- General of the army, a military rank used in some countries to denote a senior leader
- Genoa Cristoforo Colombo Airport located west of Genoa, Italy, by IATA code
- Government of Afghanistan, a country in central Asia
- Government of Alberta, a province in Canada
- Government of Australia, the federal government of the Commonwealth of Australia
- Grade of Automation (GoA) for trains
- Greek Orthodox Archdiocese of America
- Gun Owners of America, a gun rights organization in the United States
- Rhein-Hunsrück-Kreis (for Sankt Goar, German vehicle registration plate code)

== People with the surname ==
- Daniel Goa (born 1953), New Caledonian politician
- Trygve Goa (1925–2013), Norwegian printmaker

== Film ==
- Goa (2010 film), an Indian Tamil-language romantic comedy film by Venkat Prabhu
- Goa (2015 film), an Indian Kannada-language romantic comedy film by Surya

== Music ==
- Goa (soundtrack), soundtrack album by Yuvan Shankar Raja for the 2010 Indian film
- "Goa", a track from the Frank Zappa album Guitar
- Goa trance, a form of electronic music that originated during the late 1980s in Goa, India
- Go A, a music band that represented Ukraine at the Eurovision Song Contest 2021

== Nature ==
- Goa (antelope), also known as the Tibetan Gazelle, a species of antelope in and around Tibet
- Goa bean, another name for the winged bean

== Other uses ==
- Goa, a board game by Rüdiger Dorn
- Goa, the gaming division of Orange/France Telecom
- Goa, name of the Mahindra Scorpio SUV in Italy
- S-125 Neva/Pechora, a Soviet surface-to-air missile system with NATO reporting name SA-3 Goa

== See also ==
- The dictionary definition of Appendix:Variations of "goa" at Wiktionary
- Goas (disambiguation)
- Gao (disambiguation)
