= Battle of Gao (disambiguation) =

The name Battle of Gao may refer to the following battles, during the ongoing Mali war that began on 16 January 2012:

- Battle of Gao, the first battle in June 2012
- Second Battle of Gao, the recapture of the city in January 2013
- Third Battle of Gao, on 9–11 February 2013
- Fourth Battle of Gao, on 20–22 February 2013
- Fifth Battle of Gao, in March 2013
