= Dalo, Ziro =

Dalo
- Location within Burkina Faso
- Coordinates: 11°44′34″N 2°04′33″W
- Country: Burkina Faso
- Region: Centre-Ouest
- Province: Ziro Province
- Department: Dalo Department

Population (2019)
  - Total: 5,173
- Time zone: UTC+0 (Coordinated Universal Time)

Dalo is a village in Ziro Province, Burkina Faso. The population estimate was 4,000 in 2006. Dalo is the administrative seat of Dalo Department.
