= Largogo =

Coordinates: 12°57′N 2°47′W

- Interactive map of Largogo
- Country: Burkina Faso
- Region: Boucle du Mouhoun Region
- Province: Nayala
- Department: Yaba Department

Population (2005)
  - Total: 96

Largogo is a village in the Yaba Department of Nayala Province in north-western Burkina Faso. The village has a population of 96.
