= Tiema =

Coordinates: 12°44′N 2°47′W

- Interactive map of Tiema
- Country: Burkina Faso
- Region: Boucle du Mouhoun Region
- Province: Nayala
- Department: Yaba Department

Population (2005)
  - Total: 444

Tiema is a village in the Yaba Department of Nayala Province in north-western Burkina Faso. The village has a population of 444
