= Gouri, Burkina Faso =

Gouri
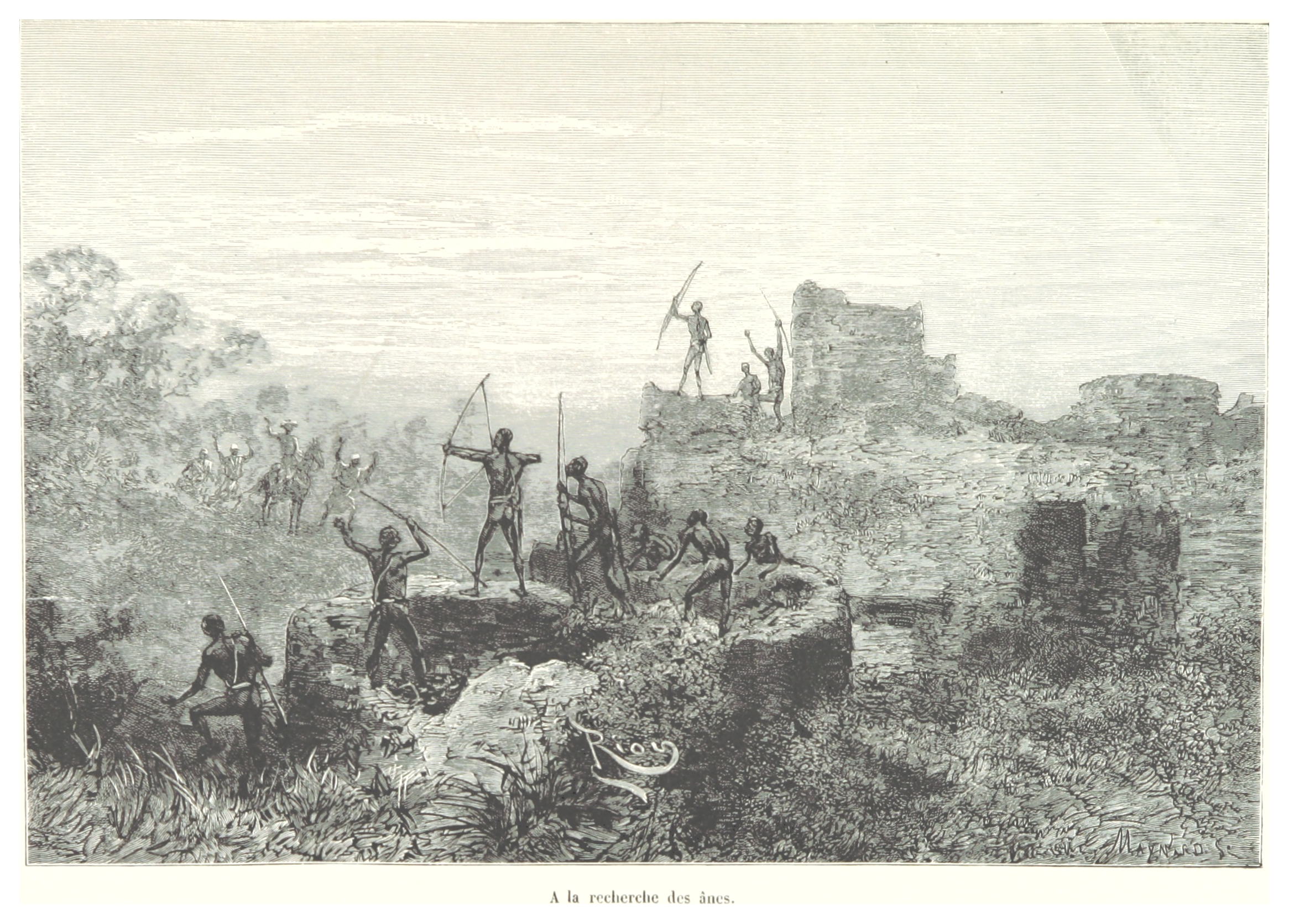
- Interactive map of Gouri
- Coordinates: 11.8°N 2.5°W
- Country: Burkina Faso
- Region: Boucle du Mouhoun Region
- Province: Nayala Province
- Department: Kougny Department

Population (2003)
  - Total: 1,182

Gouri is a village in the Kougny Department of Nayala Province in western Burkina Faso. As of 2003, the village had a population of 1182.
