= Gaos =

Gaos may refer to:

- Geneva Amateur Operatic Society, a society based in Geneva
- Gyaos (ギャオス, Gyaosu, or Gaos), several monsters from Daiei's Gamera film series
- José Gaos (1900–1969), Spanish-born philosopher
- Lola Gaos (1921–1993), Spanish film, television and theatre actress
- Vicente Gaos (1919–1980), Spanish poet and essayist

== See also ==
- Gao (disambiguation)
