= Corruption in Burkina Faso =

Corruption in Burkina Faso is a problem that permeates all sectors of its society. Bureaucratic corruption in Burkina Faso is particularly rampant and it was one of the main reasons for the 2014 public uprising that toppled Blaise Compaoré, who served as the country’s president for 27 years.

== Legacy of corruption ==
Burkina Faso gained independence in 1960 from France when then-prime minister and army captain Thomas Sankara staged a successful military coup. As leader of the newly established communist government, he consolidated his power with an ambitious development plan focused on socio-economic reform and the nationalization of natural resource extraction. Sankara's anti-corruption rhetoric, exemplified by the country's new name—Burkina Faso, meaning "land of incorruptible men"—provided ideological support for these initiatives.

By 1987, however, Sankara was assassinated and was replaced by Blaise Compaoré. His successor introduced a plan that emphasized the democratization of Burkina Faso, the establishment of a multi-party system, and a process of decentralization. Under him, Burkina Faso descended in what was described as the usual trajectory of a "FrancAfrican" country: corruption, plunder of mineral resources, political murders, and nepotism. To perpetuate his regime, Compaoré created networks of clientelism and patronage along with the harsh suppression of political opposition. For years, bureaucratic corruption has persisted in the country and has affected key branches of the government such as the judiciary, public health, and education. This has also created a culture of impunity so that efforts to combat the problem remain challenging.

== International ranking ==
In Transparency International's 2025 Corruption Perceptions Index, Burkina Faso scored 40 on a scale from 0 ("highly corrupt") to 100 ("very clean"). When ranked by score, Burkina Faso ranked 84th among the 182 countries in the Index, where the country ranked first is perceived to have the most honest public sector. For comparison with regional scores, the best score among sub-Saharan African countries (Note: Angola, Benin, Botswana, Burkina Faso, Burundi, Cameroon, Cape Verde, Central African Republic, Chad, Comoros, Côte d'Ivoire, Democratic Republic of the Congo, Djibouti, Equatorial Guinea, Eritrea, Eswatini, Ethiopia, Gabon, Gambia, Ghana, Guinea, Guinea-Bissau, Kenya, Lesotho, Liberia, Madagascar, Malawi, Mali, Mauritania, Mauritius, Mozambique, Namibia, Niger, Nigeria, Republic of the Congo, Rwanda, Sao Tome and Principe, Senegal, Seychelles, Sierra Leone, Somalia, South Africa, South Sudan, Sudan, Tanzania, Togo, Uganda, Zambia, and Zimbabwe.) was 68, the average was 32 and the worst was 9. For comparison with worldwide scores, the best score was 89 (ranked 1), the average was 42, and the worst was 9 (ranked 181, in a two-way tie).

== Corruption cases ==
The most notable example of corruption in Burkina Faso involved Blaise Compaoré, who ruled his country for almost three decades. His regime, which began in 1987, was marred by abuse of power and widespread corruption, particularly the embezzlement and misuse of public funds. When he assumed power after the assassination of his predecessor, Thomas Sankara, Compaoré tightened his grip on the presidency by consolidating power, suppressing the opposition, and manipulation of the electoral process.

As years passed, a culture of impunity emerged and Compaoré, including his inner circle, engaged in illicit activities to enrich themselves. Paranoid of being prosecuted and imprisoned, he sought to avoid them by remaining in power through the suppression and harassment of the political opposition and exploiting flawed political processes. Hundreds were killed with impunity during Compaoré’s regime. One notable incident was the murder of the journalist, Norbert Zongo. He was investigating the killing of the driver of the president’s brother, François Compaoré. Zongo’s death, which the government claimed was an accident, sparked widespread protests and accusations of cover-up.

By the time Compaoré was ousted during the 2014 uprising, he already amassed an estimated $275 million. After he fled the country, two of his ministers, Jean Bertin Ouedraogo and Jerome Bougouma, were arrested and charged with embezzlement of public funds and illicit enrichment. The former ministers were part of eight cabinet officials, who were investigated by the National Transition Council for corruption.

== Impact ==
Corruption has a significant impact on Burkina Faso and its people. The misuse of public funds makes it difficult for ordinary citizens to access essential services. In order to avail of scarce resources and services, people need to resort to bribery. The misuse of public funds has also hampered economic development and exposed the country to various threats, including internal security. By 2015, which is considered a transitional year for the country, Islamist terrorists have successfully infiltrated Burkina Faso and subsequent governments have so far failed to curb the problem. In 2024, about two million people have been displaced by this threat as well as the violence perpetuated by the country’s security forces. The conflict has also led to the loss of government control over around 40 percent of the country.
