= Pangogo =

Coordinates: 12°45′N 2°43′W

- Interactive map of Pangogo
- Country: Burkina Faso
- Region: Boucle du Mouhoun Region
- Province: Nayala
- Department: Yaba Department

Population (2005)
  - Total: 1,187

Pangogo is a village in the Yaba Department of Nayala Province in north-western Burkina Faso. The village has a population of 1,187.
