= Siena, Yaba =

Coordinates: 12°51′N 2°58′W

Siena
- Interactive map of Siena
- Country: Burkina Faso
- Region: Boucle du Mouhoun Region
- Province: Nayala
- Department: Yaba Department

Population (2005)
  - Total: 1,191

Siena is a village in the Yaba Department of Nayala Province in north-western Burkina Faso. The village has a population of 1,191.
