= Issapougo =

- Country: Burkina Faso
- Region: Boucle du Mouhoun Region
- Province: Nayala
- Department: Yaba Department

Population (2005)
  - Total: 924

Issapougo is a village in the Yaba Department of Nayala Province in north-western Burkina Faso. The village has a population of 924.
