= Sapouy Department =

Coordinates: 11.5500°N 1.7670°W

Sapouy
- Department
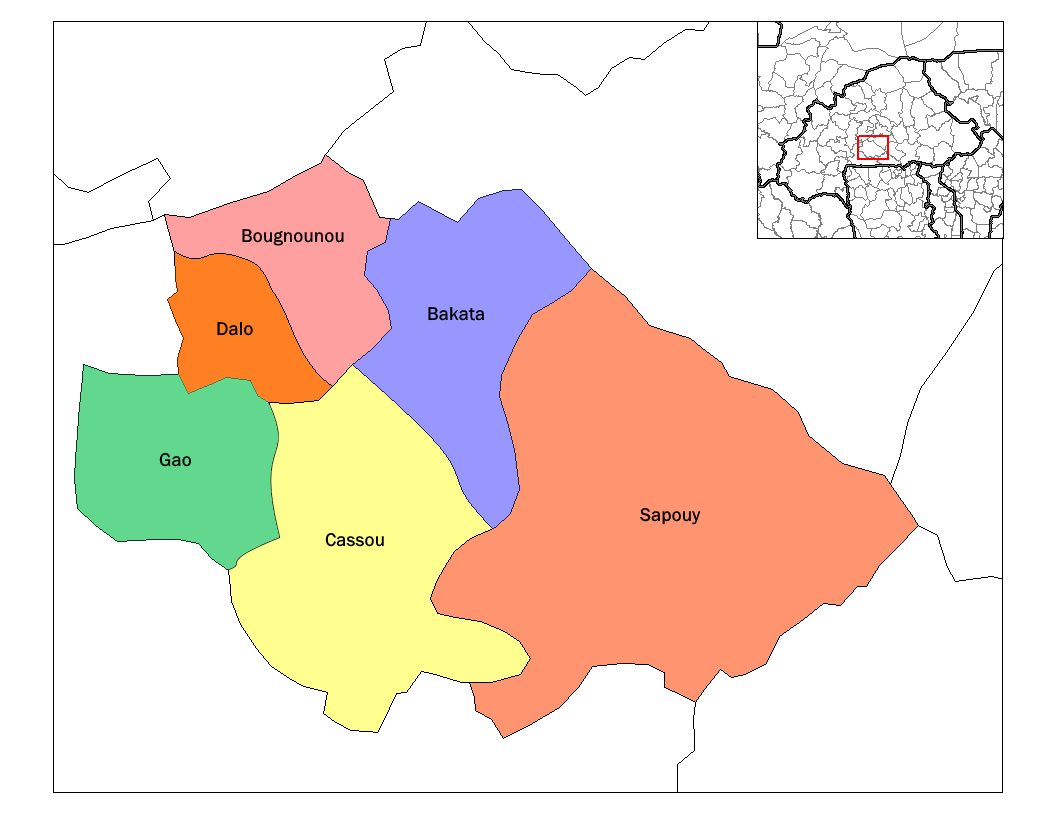
- Sapouy Department location in the province
- Country: Burkina Faso
- Province: Ziro Province

Area
  - Department: 806 sq mi (2,088 km^{2})

Population (2019 census)
  - Department: 86,729
  - Density: 107.6/sq mi (41.54/km^{2})
  - Urban: 26,345
- Time zone: UTC+0 (GMT 0)

Sapouy is a department or commune of Ziro Province in southern Burkina Faso. The capital is Sapouy. The population of the department was 86,729 in 2019.

== Towns and villages ==
- Sapouy 6187 (capital)
- Balogo 1612
- Baouiga 822
- Baouiga-Yorgo 612
- Bassawarga 548
- Bouem 307
- Bougagnonon 840
- Boulou 752
- Boom 233
- Boro 1101
- Diallo 570
- Diaré 834
- Dianzoé 587
- Faro 925
- Idiou 552
- Guirsé 265
- Gallo 1159
- Kada 546
- Kation 735
- Kouli 293
- Koutera 836
- Konon 387
- Nadonon 621
- Ladiga 308
- Latian 1073
- Lou 678
- Nabilpaga-Yorga 239
- Napo-Nabilpaga 1035
- Nébrou 1051
- Nékrou 936
- Néliri 1235
- Obonon 1330
- Ouayalguin 59
- Poun 558
- Santio 1033
- Sobaka 584
- Souboré 649
- Souli 264
- Sia 465
- Tiaré 2012
- Tiakouré 268
- Tiabien-Kasso 682
- Tiana 433
- Tiaburo 571
- Tiabien 1023
- Tiagao 806
- Yilou 437
- Zavara 577
