= Toba, Yaba =

Village in Burkina Faso

Coordinates: 12°46′N 2°46′W

Toba
- Interactive map of Toba
- Country: Burkina Faso
- Region: Boucle du Mouhoun Region
- Province: Nayala
- Department: Yaba Department

Population (2005)
  - Total: 1,227

Toba is a village in the Yaba Department of Nayala Province in northwestern Burkina Faso. The population was 1,227 in 2008.
