= Kougny Department =

Coordinates: 12°47′N 3°7′W

Kougny
- Department
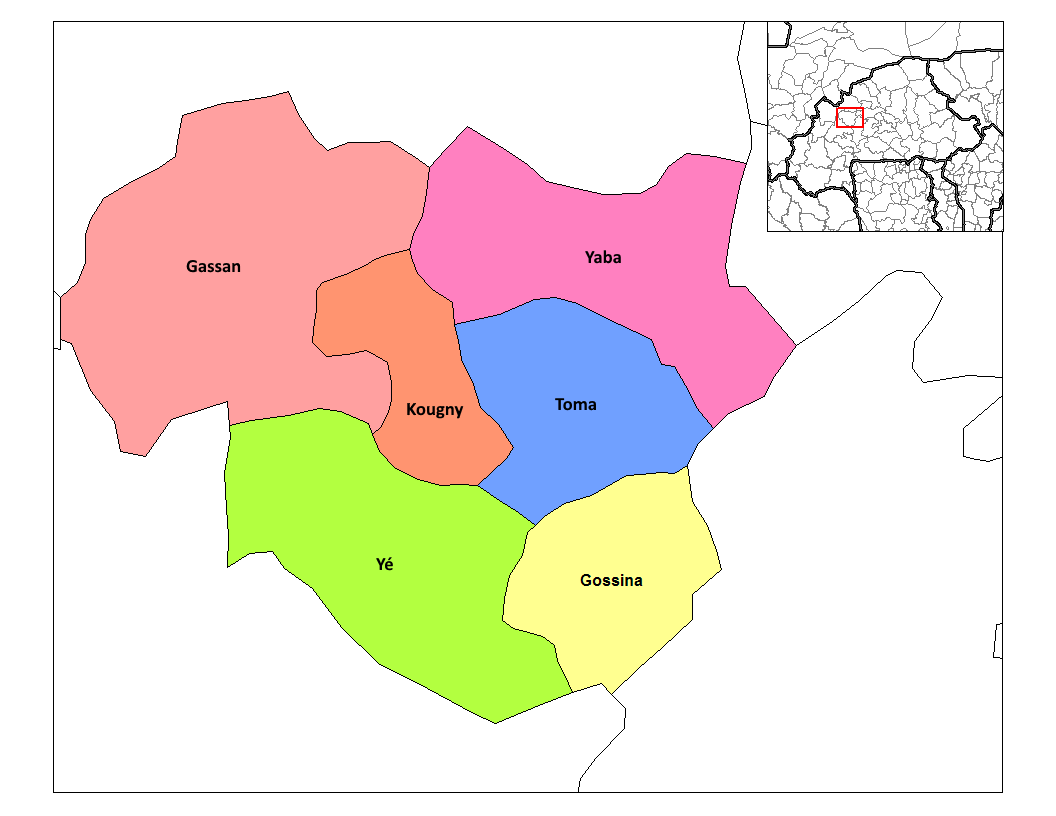
- Kougny Department location in the province
- Country: Burkina Faso
- Province: Nayala Province

Area
  - Total: 128.7 sq mi (333.4 km^{2})

Population (2019 census)
  - Total: 22,323
  - Density: 173.4/sq mi (66.96/km^{2})
- Time zone: UTC+0 (GMT 0)

Kougny is a department or commune of Nayala Province in western Burkina Faso. Its capital lies at the town of Kougny. According to the 1996 census the department has a total population of 15,383.

== Towns and villages ==
- Kougny (3 633 inhabitants) (capital)
- Goin (1 567 inhabitants)
- Gounian (1 434 inhabitants)
- Gouri (1 182 inhabitants)
- Kamba (903 inhabitants)
- Kibiri (499 inhabitants)
- Niaré (1 904 inhabitants)
- Nimina (1 746 inhabitants)
- Sebéré (1 366 inhabitants)
- Tiouma (1 149 inhabitants)
