= Bounou, Yaba =

Coordinates: 12.8054°N 2.8205°W

Bounou
- Interactive map of Bounou
- Country: Burkina Faso
- Region: Boucle du Mouhoun Region
- Province: Nayala
- Department: Yaba Department

Population (2005)
  - Total: 3,145

Bounou is a town in the Yaba Department of Nayala Province in north-western Burkina Faso. The town has a population of 3,145.
