= Loguin =

Coordinates: 12.9155°N 3.0095°W

- Interactive map of Loguin
- Country: Burkina Faso
- Region: Boucle du Mouhoun Region
- Province: Nayala
- Department: Yaba Department

Population (2005)
  - Total: 305

Loguin is a village in the Yaba Department of Nayala Province, Burkina Faso. The village has a population of 305.
