= Saran, Yaba =

Coordinates: 12°55′N 2°58′W

Bagnontenga
- Interactive map of Bagnontenga
- Country: Burkina Faso
- Region: Boucle du Mouhoun Region
- Province: Nayala
- Department: Yaba Department

Population (2005)
  - Total: 1,095

Saran is a village in the Yaba Department of Nayala Province in north-western Burkina Faso. The village has a population of 1,095.
