= Sapala =

Coordinates: 12°42′N 2°42′W

- Interactive map of Sapala
- Country: Burkina Faso
- Region: Boucle du Mouhoun Region
- Province: Nayala
- Department: Yaba Department

Population (2005)
  - Total: 1,165

Sapala is a village in the Yaba Department of Nayala Province in north-western Burkina Faso. The village has a population of 1,165.
