= Sien, Burkina Faso =

Coordinates: 12.6926°N 2.8987°W

Sien is a village in the Toma Department in the province of Nayala in Burkina Faso. Sien has a population of 707.
