= Yé Department =

Department of Nayala Province, Burkina Faso

Coordinates: 12°36′N 3°07′W

Yé
- Department
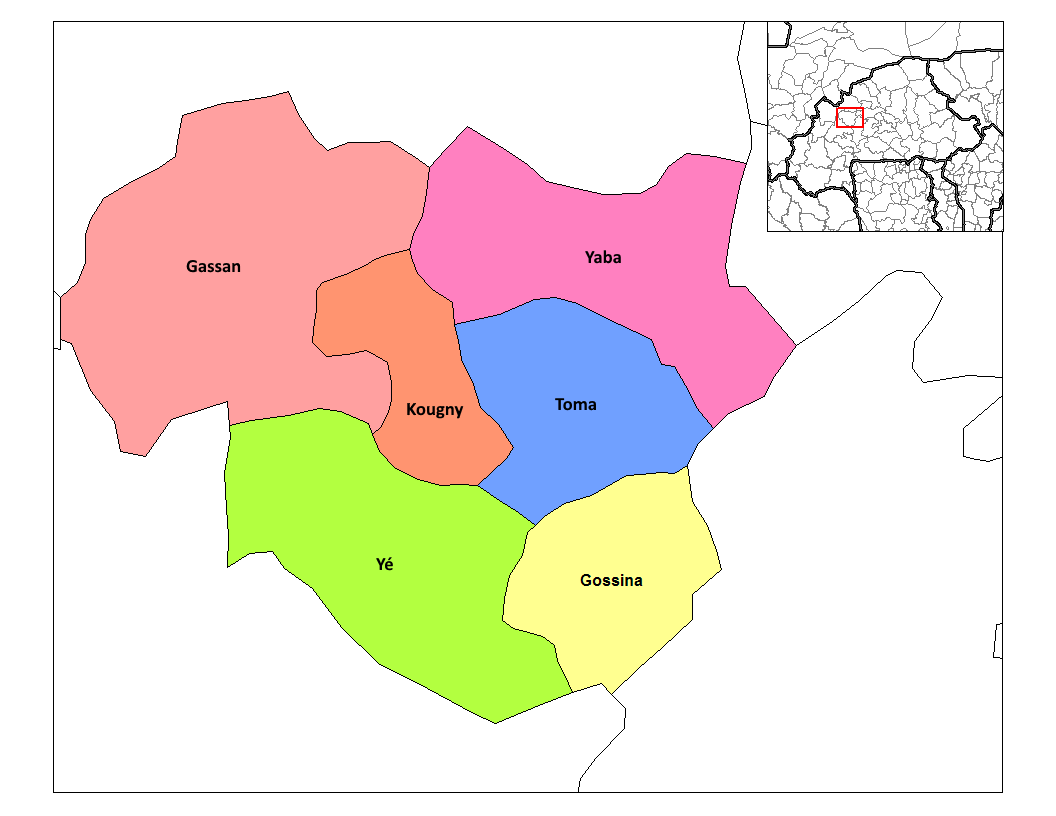
- Yé Department location in the province
- Country: Burkina Faso
- Province: Nayala Province

Population (1996)
  - Total: 34,851
- Time zone: UTC+0 (GMT 0)

Yé is a department or commune of Nayala Province in western Burkina Faso. Its capital lies at the town of Yé. According to the 1996 census the department has a total population of 34,851.

== Towns and villages ==
- Yé (5 903 inhabitants) (capital)
- Bondaogtenga (766 inhabitants)
- Bouna (1 212 inhabitants)
- Daman (3 541 inhabitants)
- Doumbassa (1 077 inhabitants)
- Goersa (1 471 inhabitants)
- Kangotenga (903 inhabitants)
- Kobé (160 inhabitants)
- Mélou (2 971 inhabitants)
- Mobgowindtenga (1 430 inhabitants)
- Nabonswindé (1 780 inhabitants)
- Niempourou (1 901 inhabitants)
- Noagtenga (565 inhabitants)
- Sankoué (2 993 inhabitants)
- Saoura (2 056 inhabitants)
- Sidikitenga (638 inhabitants)
- Siguinvoussé (862 inhabitants)
- Tani (2 567 inhabitants)
- Watinoma (1 458 inhabitants)
- Yambatenga (597 inhabitants)
