= Zouma, Burkina Faso =

Coordinates: 12.6650°N 2.9235°W

Zouma is a village in the province of Nayala in Burkina Faso. Zouma has a population of 2,964.
