= Koin, Burkina Faso =

Coordinates: 12.7194°N 2.8420°W

Koin is a village in the province of Nayala in Burkina Faso. Koin has a population of 3.330.
