= Yaba Department =

Coordinates: 12°52′N 2°52′W

Yaba
- Department
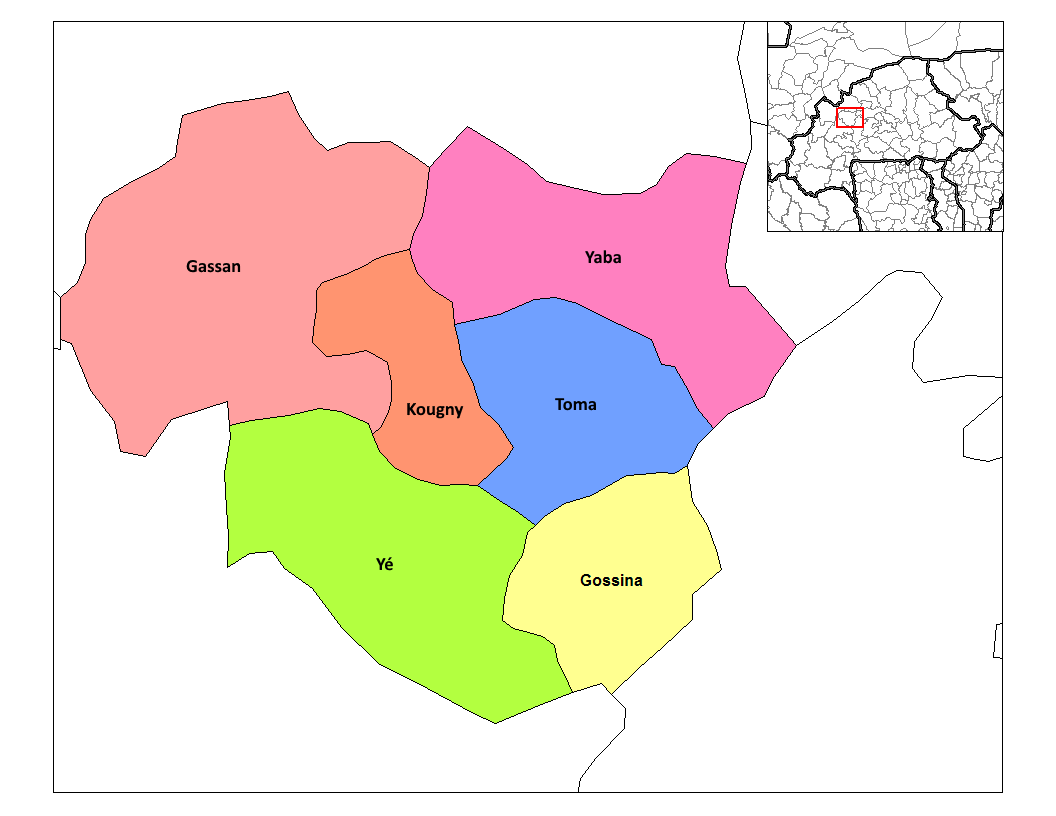
- Yaba Department location in the province
- Country: Burkina Faso
- Province: Nayala Province

Area
  - Total: 290 sq mi (740 km^{2})

Population (2019 census)
  - Total: 41,369
  - Density: 140/sq mi (56/km^{2})
- Time zone: UTC+0 (GMT 0)

Yaba is a department or commune of Nayala Province in western Burkina Faso. Its capital is the town of Yaba. According to the 2019 census the department has a total population of 41,369.

== Towns and villages ==
- Yaba (6 591 inhabitants) (capital)
- Bagnontenga (1 105 inhabitants)
- Basnéré (182 inhabitants)
- Biba (3 479 inhabitants)
- Bo (1 116 inhabitants)
- Bounou (3 145 inhabitants)
- Doloba (167 inhabitants)
- Issapougo (924 inhabitants)
- Kera (845 inhabitants)
- Lah (378 inhabitants)
- Largogo (96 inhabitants)
- Loguin (305 inhabitants)
- Pangogo (1 187 inhabitants)
- Pasnam (432 inhabitants)
- Sapala (1 165 inhabitants)
- Saran (1 095 inhabitants)
- Siellé (3 064 inhabitants)
- Siena (1 191 inhabitants)
- Tiema (444 inhabitants)
- Toba (1 227 inhabitants)
- Tosson (1 068 inhabitants)
- Zaré (600 inhabitants)
