= Goas =

Goas may refer to:

== People ==
- Edgardo Goás (born 1989), Puerto Rican volleyball player
- Urko Pardo Goas (born 1983), Belgian football player

== Places ==
- Goas, Tarn-et-Garonne, Occitanie, France
- Lamothe-Goas, Gers, France

== Other ==
- Goa (antelope), relatively small antelopes

== See also ==
- Goa (disambiguation)
