= Bakata (department) =

- Department
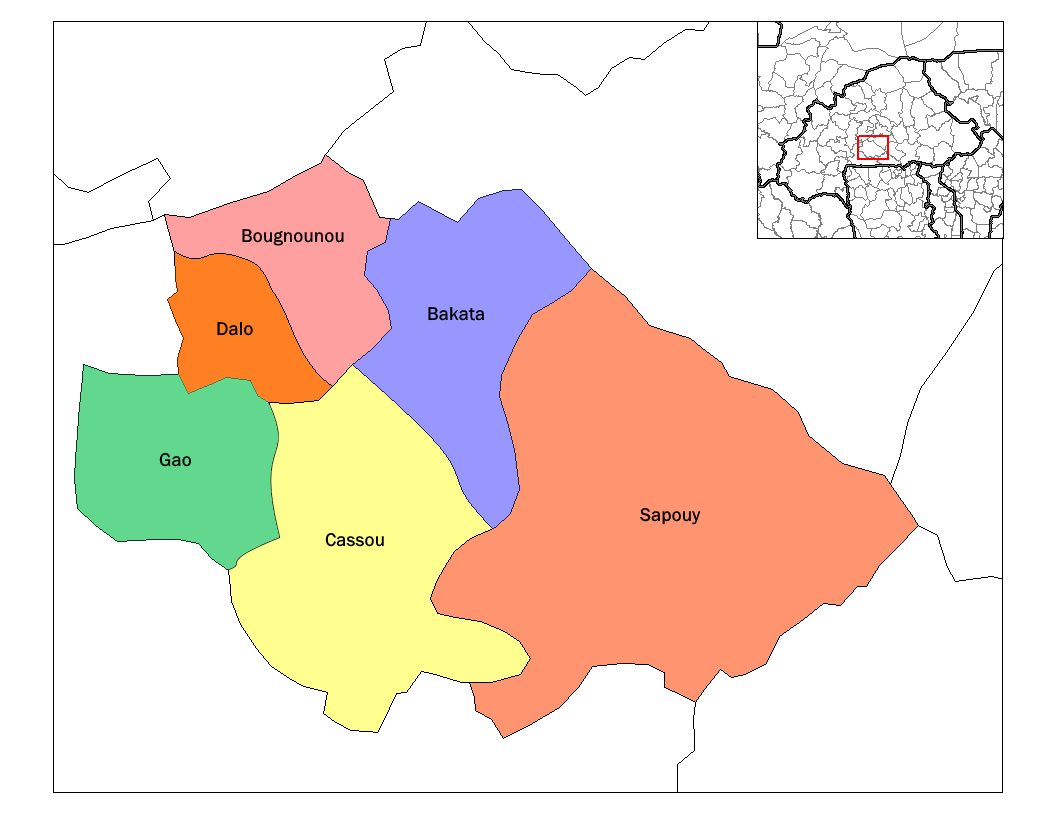
- Bakata Department location in the province
- Country: Burkina Faso
- Region: Centre-Ouest Region
- Province: Ziro Province

Area
  - Total: 240.5 sq mi (623.0 km^{2})

Population (2019 census)
  - Total: 32,480
- Time zone: UTC+0 (GMT 0)

Bakata is a department or commune of Ziro Province in Burkina Faso.

== Cities ==
1 cities

- Bakata

13 villages

- Basnéré
- Biyéné
- Boulé-Daboré
- Boulé-Gala
- Bouyoua
- Diao
- Kinkirsgogo
- Kou
- Kouboulou
- Lorou
- Payiri
- Tayalo
- Zinloua.
