= Goussi =

Village in Burkina Faso

Coordinates: 12°39′58″N 2°47′43″W

Goussi is a village in the province of Nayala in Burkina Faso. Goussi has a population of 516.
