= Bougnounou Department =

Coordinates: 11.8000°N 1.9833°W

Bougnounou
- Department
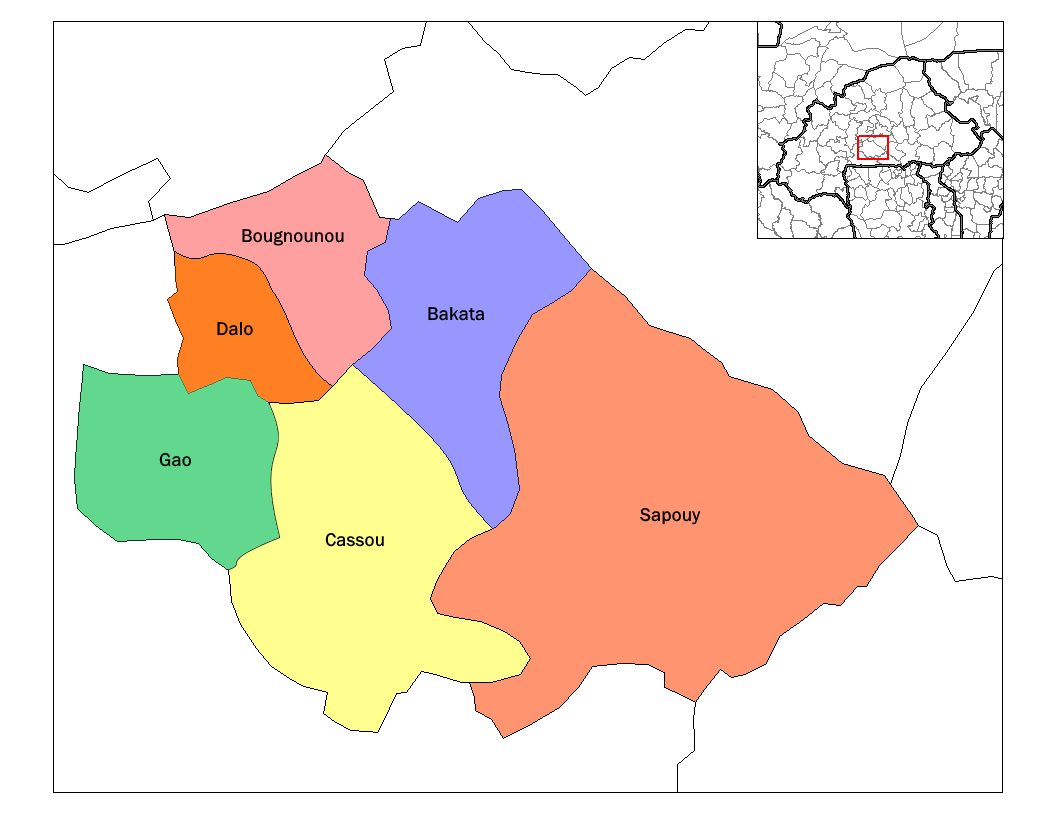
- Bougnounou Department location in the province
- Country: Burkina Faso
- Province: Ziro Province

Area
  - Total: 197.3 sq mi (511.0 km^{2})

Population (2019 census)
  - Total: 28,938
- Time zone: UTC+0 (GMT 0)

Bougnounou is a department or commune of Ziro Province in southern Burkina Faso. The capital is Bougnounou. The population of the department was 21,209 in 2006.

== Towns and villages ==
- Bougnounou 4439
- Bélinayou 107
- Bablanayou 74
- Zao 1187
- Tiamien 245
- Yalanayou 253
- Tempouré 1045
- Suné 595
- Sapo 1248
- Salo 1404
- Sala 2138
- Pebiou 652
- Nessaguerou 178
- Netiao 1170
- Laré 762
- Keulou 158
- Ginsenayou 205
- Guelou 650
- Dana 1760
- Bolo 1211
