= Gaon =

Gaon may refer to

- Gaon (Hebrew), a non-formal title given to certain Jewish Rabbis
  - Geonim, presidents of the two great Talmudic Academies of Sura and Pumbedita
  - Palestinian Gaonate
  - Vilna Gaon, known as the Gaon of Vilnius
- Gaon Music Chart, record chart in South Korea
- Yehoram Gaon, Israeli singer
- Gaon (film), a 2018 Indian drama film
- Gaon (restaurant), a restaurant in South Korea

== See also ==
- Gao (disambiguation)
