= Gassam Department =

Coordinates: 12°49′00″N 3°12′00″W

Gassam
- Department
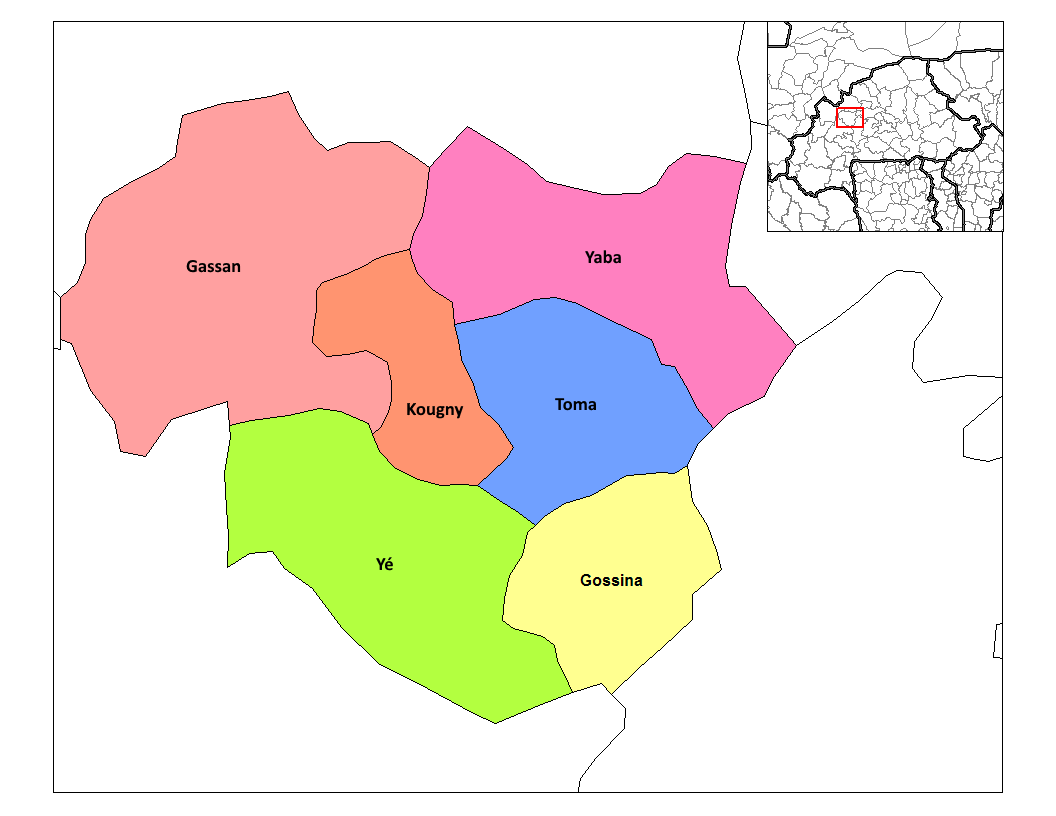
- Gassam Department location in the province
- Country: Burkina Faso
- Province: Nayala Province

Area
  - Total: 400 sq mi (1,030 km^{2})

Population (2019 census)
  - Total: 44,132
  - Density: 111/sq mi (42.8/km^{2})
- Time zone: UTC+0 (GMT 0)

Gassam is a department or commune of Nayala Province in western Burkina Faso. Its capital is the town of Gassam. According to the 2019 census the department has a total population of 44,132.

== Towns and villages ==
- Gassam (6 176 inhabitants) (capital)
- Balanso (493 inhabitants)
- Djimbara (1 900 inhabitants)
- Dièrè (2 342 inhabitants)
- Djin (824 inhabitants)
- Goni (830 inhabitants)
- Korombéré (630 inhabitants)
- Kossé (1 900 inhabitants)
- Koussiba (341 inhabitants)
- Koussidian (881 inhabitants)
- Laraba (1 486 inhabitants)
- Larè (1 086 inhabitants)
- Léry (1 294 inhabitants)
- Lesséré (933 inhabitants)
- Moara-Grand (1 515 inhabitants)
- Moara-Petit (693 inhabitants)
- Soni (734 inhabitants)
- Soroni (694 inhabitants)
- Soro (1 537 inhabitants)
- Téri-Rimaïbé (418 inhabitants)
- Téri-Samo (342 inhabitants)
- Tissi (1 528 inhabitants)
- Toubani (651 inhabitants)
- Warou (633 inhabitants)
- Zaba (2 012 inhabitants)
