= Norbert Zongo =

Assassinated Burkinabé investigative journalist (1949–1998)

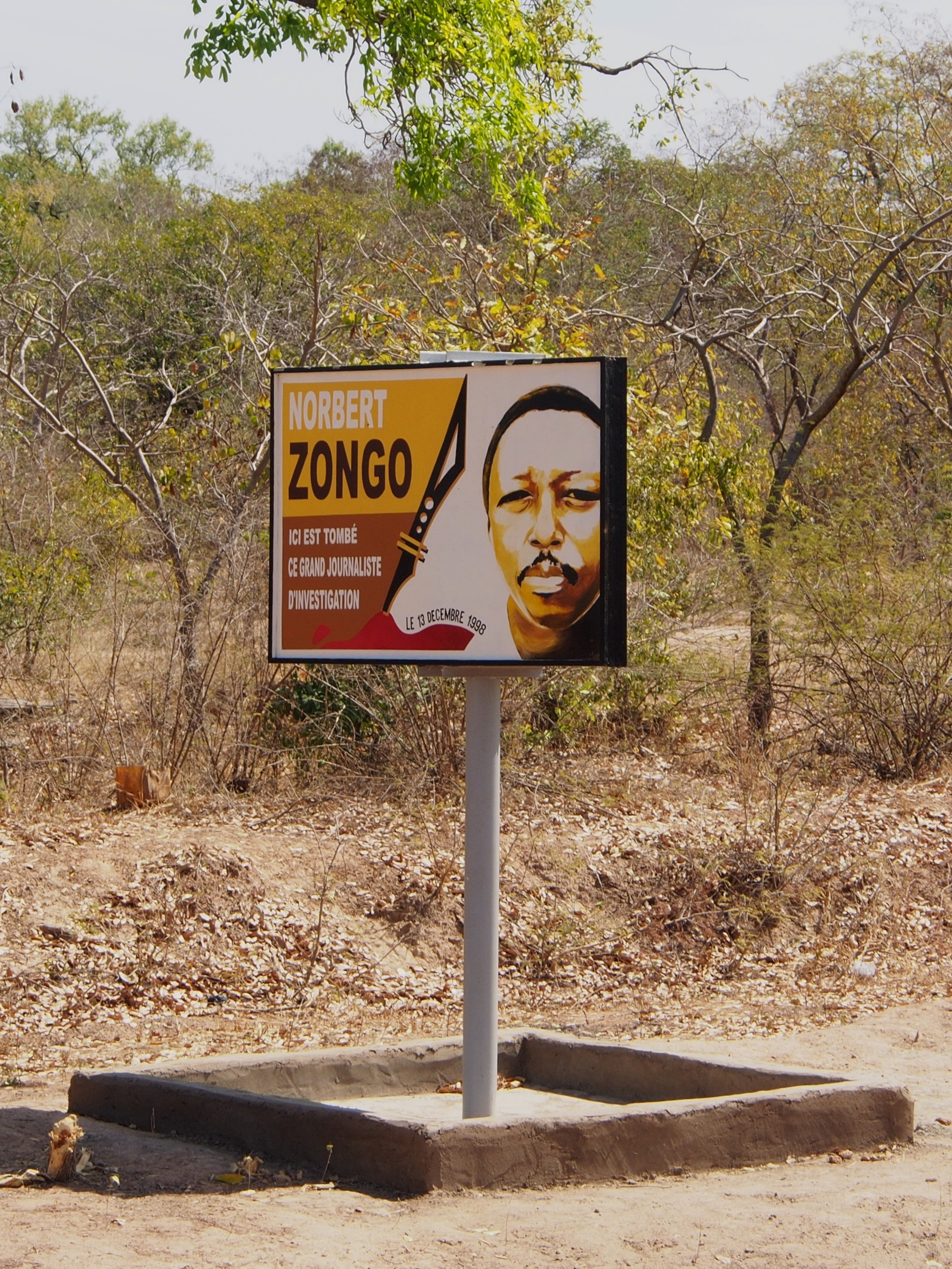
- Born: 31 July 1949; Koudougou region, French Upper Volta
- Died: 13 December 1998 (aged 49); Near Sapouy, Ziro Province, Burkina Faso
- Cause of death: Gunshot wounds
- Writing career
- Education: University of Abidjan; University of Benin; University of Yaoundé
- Occupation: Investigative journalist
- Spouse: Genevieve Zongo
- Children: 2 sons
- Relatives: Ernest Zongo (Brother)
- Pen name: Henri Segbo
- Notable works: Le parachutage (1988); Rougbêinga
- Notable awards: Integrity Award

Norbert Zongo (31 July 1949 – 13 December 1998), also known under the pen name Henri Segbo or H.S., was a Burkinabé investigative journalist who managed the newspaper L'Indépendant in Ouagadougou, Burkina Faso. Under Zongo's supervision, L'Indépendant exposed extortion and impunity within the government of Burkina Faso President Blaise Compaoré. He was assassinated after his newspaper began investigating the murder of a driver who had worked for the brother of Compaoré.

== Early life and education ==
Norbert Zongo was born in the Koudougou region, French Upper Volta on 31 July 1949 into the Gnougnoossi family, a prominent subset of the Mossi people. While in secondary school in 1964, he created a newspaper, La Voix du Cours Normal, writing bulletins on his exercise sheets with information gleaned from morning broadcasts from Radio France Internationale, BBC World Service, and other international radio stations. School officials eventually banned his publication after it discussed political topics. After high school, Zongo pursued legal studies at University of Abidjan in Côte d'Ivoire and journalism at the University of Benin in Togo. The latter university expelled him and he was imprisoned in Burkina Faso after he published his political novel Le Parachutage. He was able to finish his education in journalism at the University of Yaoundé in Cameroon.

Zongo was a supporter of human rights and also helped found the Movement for Human and Peoples' Rights, an organization in Burkina Faso.

Norbert Zongo's remains are buried in Gounghin Military Cemetery located just West of Ouagadougou.

== Career ==
In 1971, Norbert Zongo began his career as a teacher in Ouagadougou, Kadiogo Province.

Zongo was also a writer. His first novel Le Parachutage was a thinly disguised political critique of Togo's President Gnassingbé Eyadema set in the post-colonial era. In the preface of the novel in 1988, Zongo mentions being arrested and beaten for writing it. He followed this novel with the colonial setting for Rougbêinga two years later, which was also political satire of leadership.

In 1991, Zongo, after working for the national daily paper Sidwaya, founded La Clef with Saturnin Ki. It was the first newspaper in Burkina Faso to openly criticism the government, with Zongo contributing under the pseudonym Henri Sebgo (or H.S.). The paper folded in 1993. That June, Zongo founded the weekly L'Indépendant, which primarily covered government corruption. In 1996, he began investigating a series of fraud and graft cases involving several mining and manufacturing companies with ties to top political officials and President Blaise Compaoré's family. His resulting work severely embarrassed the government. The following year, Zongo directly criticized the Parliament's decision to amend the Constitution to allow Compaoré to seek a third term.

== Disappearance and murder ==
Ouagadougou is the largest city and the capital of Burkina Faso.

In December 1997, a suspicious disappearance and possible murder of David Ouedraogo, the driver of François Compaoré (President Blaise Campaoré's brother), prompted Zongo to investigate. Ouedrago was tortured and killed for allegedly stealing large sums of money. Zongo reported the case and wrote small excerpts every week for his newspaper. He began getting death threats and the government ignored them. His wife, Genevieve Zongo, confirmed that he was receiving death threats from 1997 to his death in 1998. She was told that Norbert would often be followed by a car while on his motorbike. Zongo was also approached to convince him to drop his investigation, but he continued until his death.

On December 13, 1998, four bodies were found shot and burned in a Toyota Land cruiser on the side of the road in Sapouy, Ziro Province. The remains were identified as Norbert Zongo; Zongo's brother Yembi Ernest Zongo; Blaise Ilboudo, a colleague; and Abdouleye Ablassé Nikiema, who was Zongo's driver. Zongo's death triggered a national crisis and violent protests within Burkina Faso.

In January 1999, François Compaoré was charged with murder and harboring the body of the victim in connection with the death of Ouedraogo. The charges were later dropped by a military tribunal after François Compaoré appealed against them.

Six presidential body guards were identified as suspects in the murder. In August 2000, five members of the presidential security were charged for the murder of Ouedraogo. Marcel Kafando, Edmond Koama and Ousseini Yaro, who are also suspects in the Norbert Zongo case, were convicted and sentenced to lengthy prison terms. Edmond Koama died on January 4, 2001. Marcel Kafando was the only one who was charged for the crime, but the charges were later dropped on July 19, 2006. Marcel Kafando died three years later, in 2009. The judgment was called "scandalous" by Reporters Without Borders.

Businessman Oumarou Kanazoé, who had also been implicated in documents brought forward by Reporters Without Borders, died in October 2011.

In 2013, the case was appealed for the family to have justice for their loss under a court system that was not under control of Burkina Faso. It was believed by the African Court on Human and Peoples' Rights that Burkina Faso's government covered up the case and violated the revised treaty of the Economic Community of West African States (ECOWAS) which allows freedom of expression and journalism. The ACHPR determined that the case should be reopened in order for the victim's families to be compensated for their losses.

== Impact ==
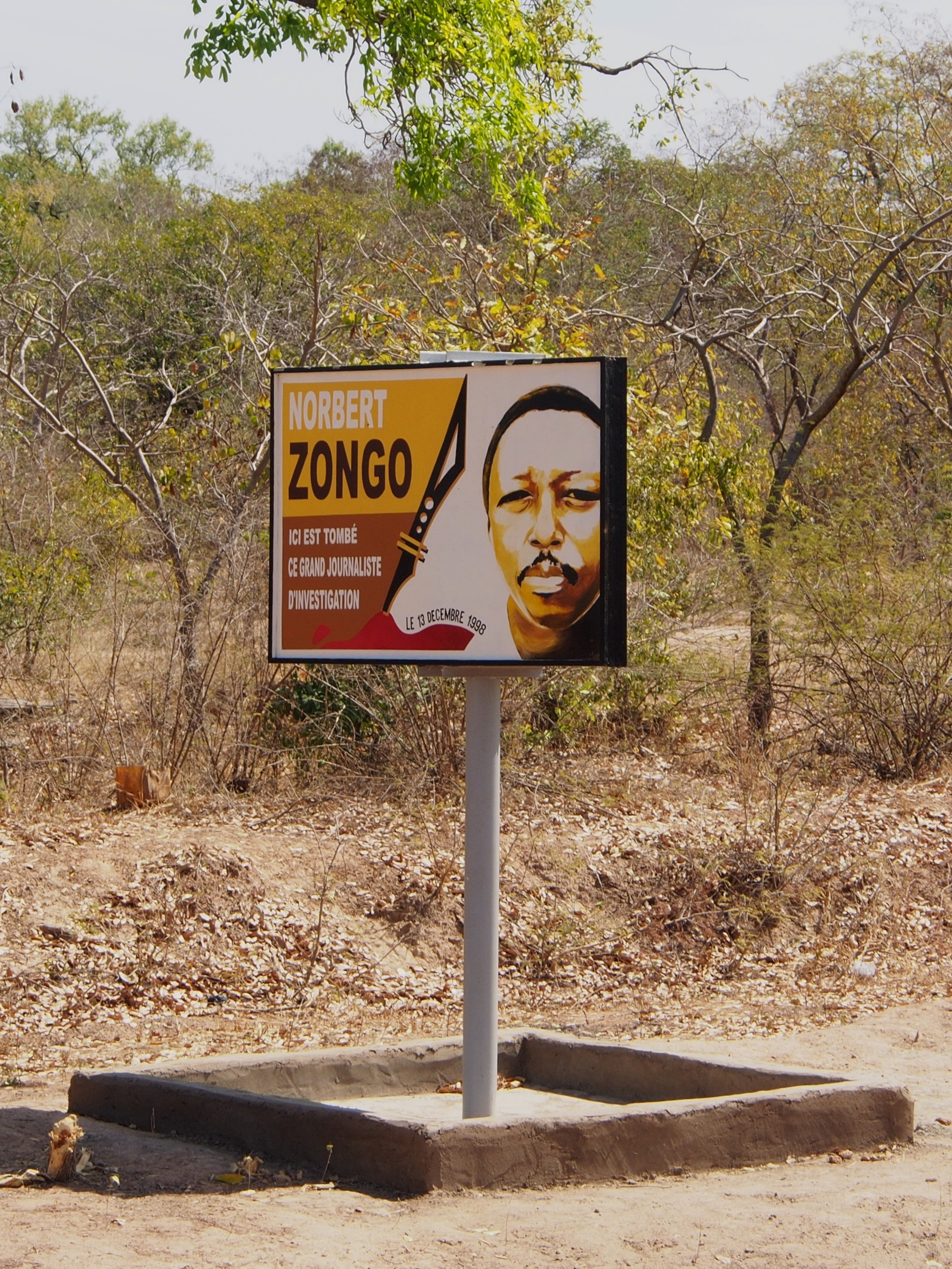
Memorial to Zongo in Sapouy

During his funeral, about 20,000 people walked ten kilometres (6.2 mi) from the mortuary to the cemetery to pay tribute to him and solidarity with his cause. In 2006, Zongo's case was determined closed with no one found guilty, which enraged civil rights defenders and citizens of Burkino Faso.

Norbert Zongo's widowed wife, Genevieve continued to keep his newspaper, the L'Indépendant, alive after his death. She remains the primary publisher and editor in memory of her late husband.

In 2014, it was determined that Norbert Zongo's case was unfairly excused due to a bias in government.

On the morning of October 29, 2017, François Compaoré was arrested at Roissy-Charles-de-Gaulle airport, based on a May 2017 international arrest warrant. A French ministerial decree authorized the extradition of Compaoré in March 2020. However, the extradition was suspended in 2021 by the European Court of Human Rights. Subsequently, in the aftermath of the 2022 coup, on December 13, 2023, France made the 2020 ministerial decree obsolete.

== Reactions ==
The Committee to Protect Journalists' Africa program coordinator, Sue Valentine, stated "We praise Burkinabe authorities for taking this step (arresting three presidential soldiers involved in Zongo's murder) and call on them to ensure that the mastermind of this murder is identified and prosecuted. After 17 long years, the family, friends, and colleagues of Norbert Zongo deserve a thorough and transparent investigation leading to full justice."

Reporters Without Borders' head of its Africa desk, Cléa Kahn-Sriber, said, "This ruling constitutes a major turning-point in the Zongo case, which has suffered appallingly from the impunity tolerated for all these years by Burkina Faso's justice system."

Reporters Without Borders, who avidly campaigned for Zongo's case, stated, "This has always been a highly political case. Zongo was killed by members of the presidential guard. François Compaoré, the brother of President Blaise Compaoré, is implicated. The authorities never stopped protecting the killers. The president has got what he always wanted – injustice."

The Independent Commission of Inquiry released the following statement: "Norbert Zongo was assassinated for purely political motives because he practiced investigative journalism. He defended a democratic ideal and had chosen to become involved, with his newspaper, in the struggle for the respect of human rights and justice, and against the poor management of the public sector and impunity."

== Legacy and commemoration ==
Many Burkinabé journalists accredit Zongo with being the first writer in the country to practice investigative journalism.

- The singer Alpha Blondy wrote a song, Journalistes en danger, about the assassination of Zongo.
- In 2012, a memorial was erected at the Highway N6 (Ouagadougou – Léo) near Sapouy, at the site of his murder.
- In 2017, the public university of Koudougou changed its name to Norbert Zongo University.

== Awards ==
In 2001 Zongo was posthumously given the Integrity Award for his work to expose government corruption.
