= Gossina Department =

Coordinates: 12°32′00″N 2°52′00″W

Gossina
- Department
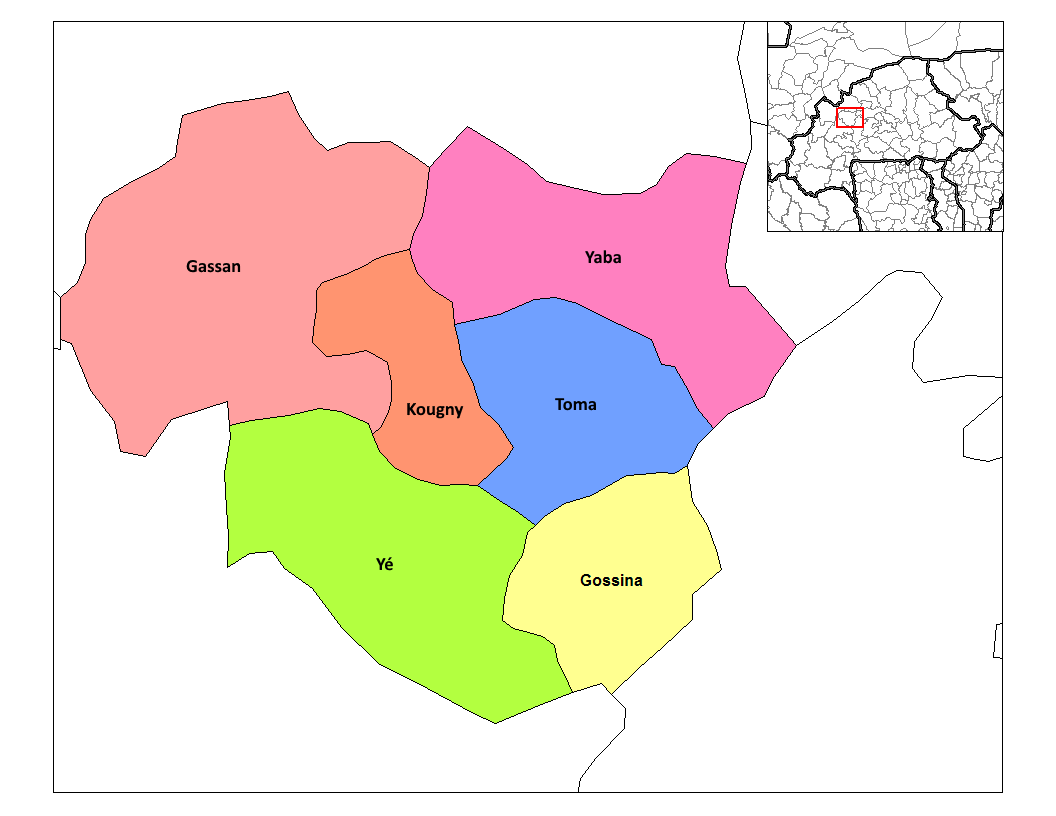
- Gossina Department location in the province
- Country: Burkina Faso
- Province: Nayala Province

Area
  - Total: 160.6 sq mi (416.0 km^{2})

Population (2019 census)
  - Total: 26,241
  - Density: 163.4/sq mi (63.08/km^{2})
- Time zone: UTC+0 (GMT 0)

Gossina is a department or commune of Nayala Province in western Burkina Faso. Its capital lies at the town of Gossina. According to the 1996 census the department has a total population of 17,945. In reference to the 2019 census, the population had seen a surge and was 26, 241. The male were 12,606 while the women were 13, 635.

== Towns and villages ==
- Gossina (3 596 inhabitants) (capital)
- Bosson (717 inhabitants)
- Boum (77 inhabitants)
- Kalabo (977 inhabitants)
- Koayo (977 inhabitants)
- Kwon (3 358 inhabitants)
- Lekoun (453 inhabitants)
- Madamao (542 inhabitants)
- Massako (902 inhabitants)
- Naboro (612 inhabitants)
- Nianankoré (169 inhabitants)
- Nyfou (921 inhabitants)
- Sui (1 7845 inhabitants)
- Tandou (232 inhabitants)
- Tarba (564 inhabitants)
- Zelassé (2 078 inhabitants)
