= François Compaoré =

Burkinabé politician

Economic Advisor to the President of Burkina Faso
- In office 1989–2014
- President: Blaise Compaoré

Personal details
- Born: 11 January 1954 (age 72) Ouagadougou
- Party: Congress for Democracy and Progress
- Relations: Blaise Compaoré (brother)

François Compaoré (born 11 January 1954) is a Burkinabé politician. He was Economic Adviser to the President of Burkina Faso, Blaise Compaoré, from 1989 to 2014. He is Compaoré's younger brother.

== Life and career ==
In 1997, François Compaoré's driver David Ouédrago was murdered. This led investigative journalist Norbert Zongo to start researching the assassination. In 1998, Zongo himself was assassinated. Compaoré's complicity was soon questioned. He was formally accused of murder in January 1999, but was not arrested; his case was redirected to a military tribunal. The examining magistrate did not interrogate Compaoré and the military tribunal dropped all charges against him. In 2006, after the judge in charge of the case dismissed the charges against presidential guard member Marcel Kafando, Reporters Without Borders (RWB) called out the "impunity" and stated that Compaoré was being protected by his brother. RWB went on to uncover evidence that the original report by a Commission of Enquiry into the murder had been "toned down on the insistence of two of its members, who represented the government". The two members had refused to sign the report until it removed passages that implicated François Compaoré and businessman Oumarou Kanazoé.

At the Fifth Ordinary Congress of the Congress for Democracy and Progress (CDP), François Compaoré was designated as a member of the CDP's National Executive Secretariat, with the post of Secretary of the Associative Movement, on 4 March 2012. He ranked 11th on the National Executive Secretariat.

By 2012, François Compaoré was "considered the new CDP strongman", and speculation centered on the possibility that he could succeed his brother at the time of the 2015 presidential election. Unless the constitution was amended prior to that point, Blaise Compaoré would be unable to stand for another term, as he would have exhausted the constitutional limit of two terms.

In the December 2012 parliamentary election, Compaoré stood as the second candidate on the CDP's candidate list for Kadiogo Province, which includes the capital Ouagadougou. The CDP won four of the available seats in Kadiogo, thus securing Compaoré a parliamentary seat. He nevertheless chose not to sit as a Deputy in the National Assembly, leaving his substitute to take his seat.

In 2014, he fled to Benin when his brother Blaise Compaoré lost power.

The new government of Burkina Faso reopened the inquiry into François Compaoré's role in the 1998 murder of Zongo and went on to issue an arrest warrant. This led to Compaoré being taken into custody by French police at the Charles de Gaulle Airport in October 2017. A French ministerial decree authorized the extradition of Compaoré to Burkina Faso in March 2020. However, the extradition was suspended in 2021 by the European Court of Human Rights. Subsequently, in the aftermath of the 2022 coup, on December 13, 2023, France made the 2020 ministerial decree authorizing the extradition obsolete.
