= Dalo Department =

- Department
- Location in Burkina Faso
- Coordinates: 11°44′N 002°05′W
- Country: Burkina Faso
- Region: Centre-Ouest
- Province: Ziro Province

Area
  - Total: 323.5 km^{2} (124.9 sq mi)

Population (2019 census)
  - Total: 12,831
- Time zone: UTC+0 (GMT 0)

Dalo Department is a department or commune of Ziro Province in southern Burkina Faso. The administrative seat is the village of Dalo. The population of the department was 10,746 in 2006.

== Towns and villages ==
The department is composed of six villages, including the administrative seat, listed with preliminary 2006 population figures:

- Dalo 4,000
- Bazilakoa 2,712
- Dianthou 955
- Guénien 770
- Niou 1,133
- Tiaré 740
