= Cassou Department =

Coordinates: 11°35′00″N 2°03′00″W

- Department
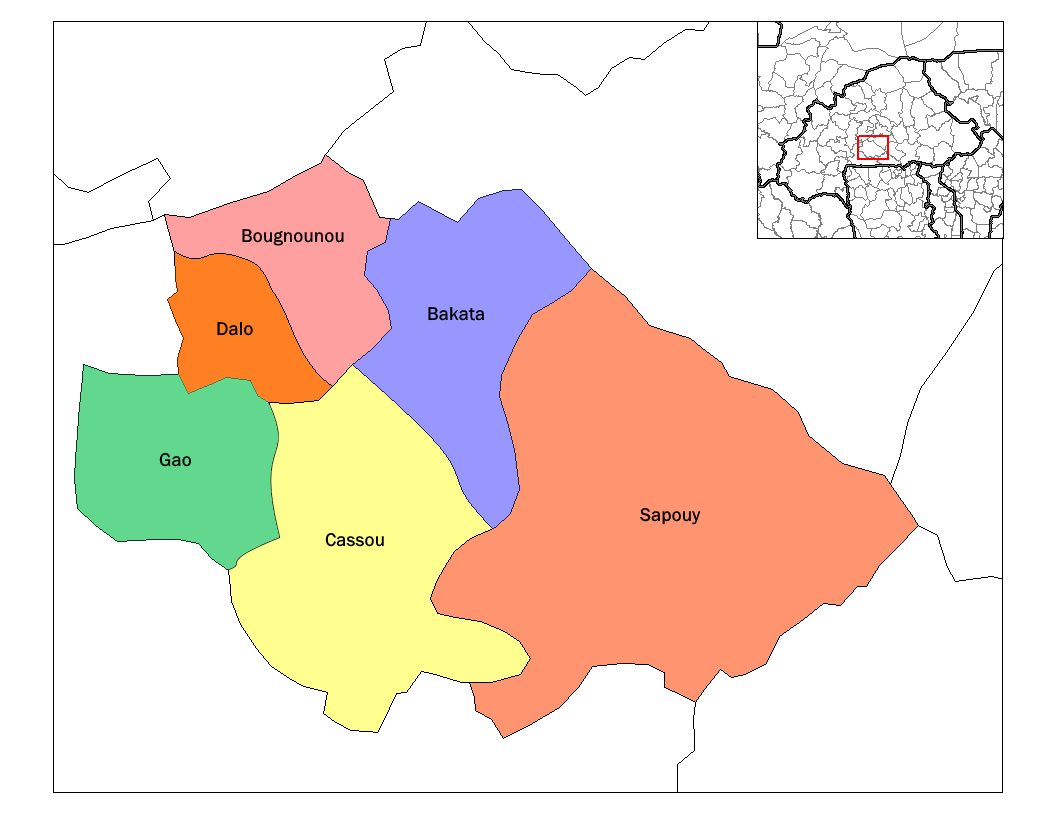
- Cassou Department prior to 2004 reorganization
- Country: Burkina Faso
- Province: Ziro Province

Area
  - Total: 450 sq mi (1,170 km^{2})

Population (2019 census)
  - Total: 54,284
- Time zone: UTC+0 (GMT 0)

Cassou is a department or commune of Ziro Province in southern Burkina Faso. The capital is Cassou. The population of the department was 40,833 in 2006.

== Towns and villages ==
The department is composed of thirty villages, including the administrative seat, listed with preliminary 2006 population figures:

- Cassou 2906 (capital)
- Lon 1654
- Néssanon 1088
- Bazawara 972
- Pien 383
- Bro-Silapoa 419
- Bonapio 938
- Niessan 996
- Vrassan 818
- Tagnan 497
- Pindao 210
- Sanyou-poé 817
- Prô 644
- Ouayou 2296
- Kondui 1598
- Pouré 963
- Sourou 1702
- Thiao 1772
- Gnansou 2258
- Kadapra 244
- Bouro 454
- Panassin 418
- Oupon 1352
- Guillan 887
- Lenon 602
- Thiaossan-koporo 1146
- Taré 554
- Kassolo-tiabona 2873
- Névry 1902
- Lué 695
