= Gao–Guenie meteorite =

Meteorite found in Burkina Faso

Gao–Guenie
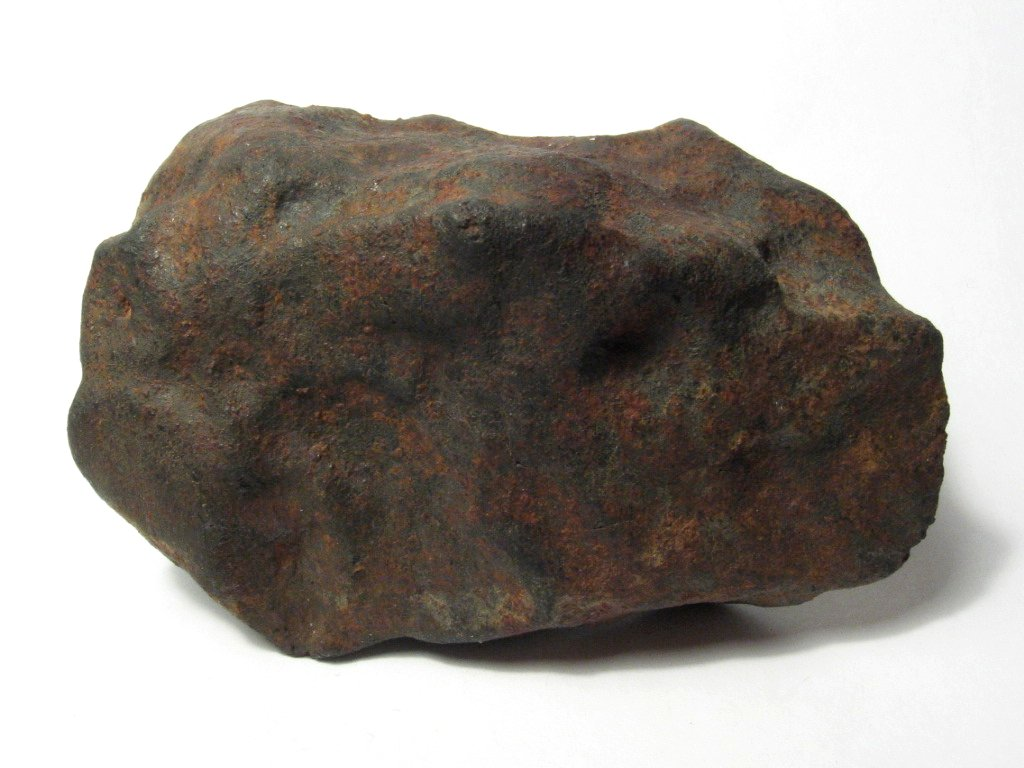
- Type: Chondrite
- Class: Ordinary chondrite
- Group: H5
- Country: Burkina Faso
- Region: Sissili and Ziro provinces
- Coordinates: 11°39′N 2°11′W
- Observed fall: Yes
- Fall date: March 5, 1960
- TKW: probably over 1000 kg
- Related media on Wikimedia Commons

Gao–Guenie is a H5 ordinary chondrite meteorite that fell on Burkina Faso, West Africa, on March 5, 1960. The fall was composed of many fragments and it is one of the largest observed meteorite showers in Africa to date.

== Name ==
The meteorites formerly known as Gao and Guenie in 1999 were officially paired and they name fused into the collective name Gao–Guenie.

== History ==
Gao–Guenie meteorites fell in Burkina Faso on March 5, 1960 at 17:00 (local time). After three separate detonations, several thousands of stones rained down over an area of about 70 square kilometres (27 sq mi). The sound of the fall was heard as far as Ouagadougou, which is 100 kilometres (62 mi) away. Eyewitnesses said that some trees were broken and henhouses destroyed. The largest stones recovered weigh up to 10 kilograms (22 lb).

== Composition and classification ==
Gao–Guenie is classified as H5 ordinary chondrite.

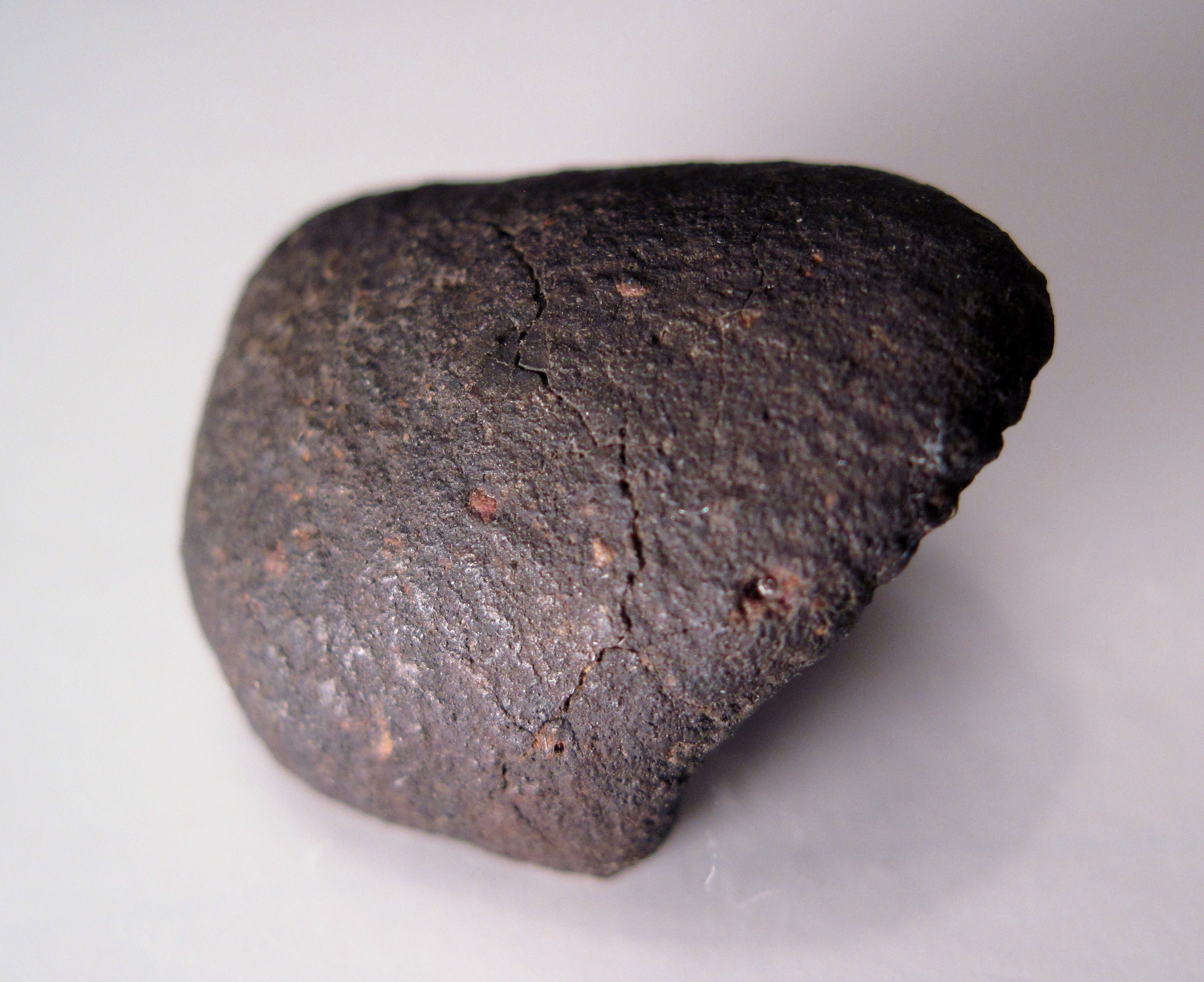
Surface details of a small oriented fragment

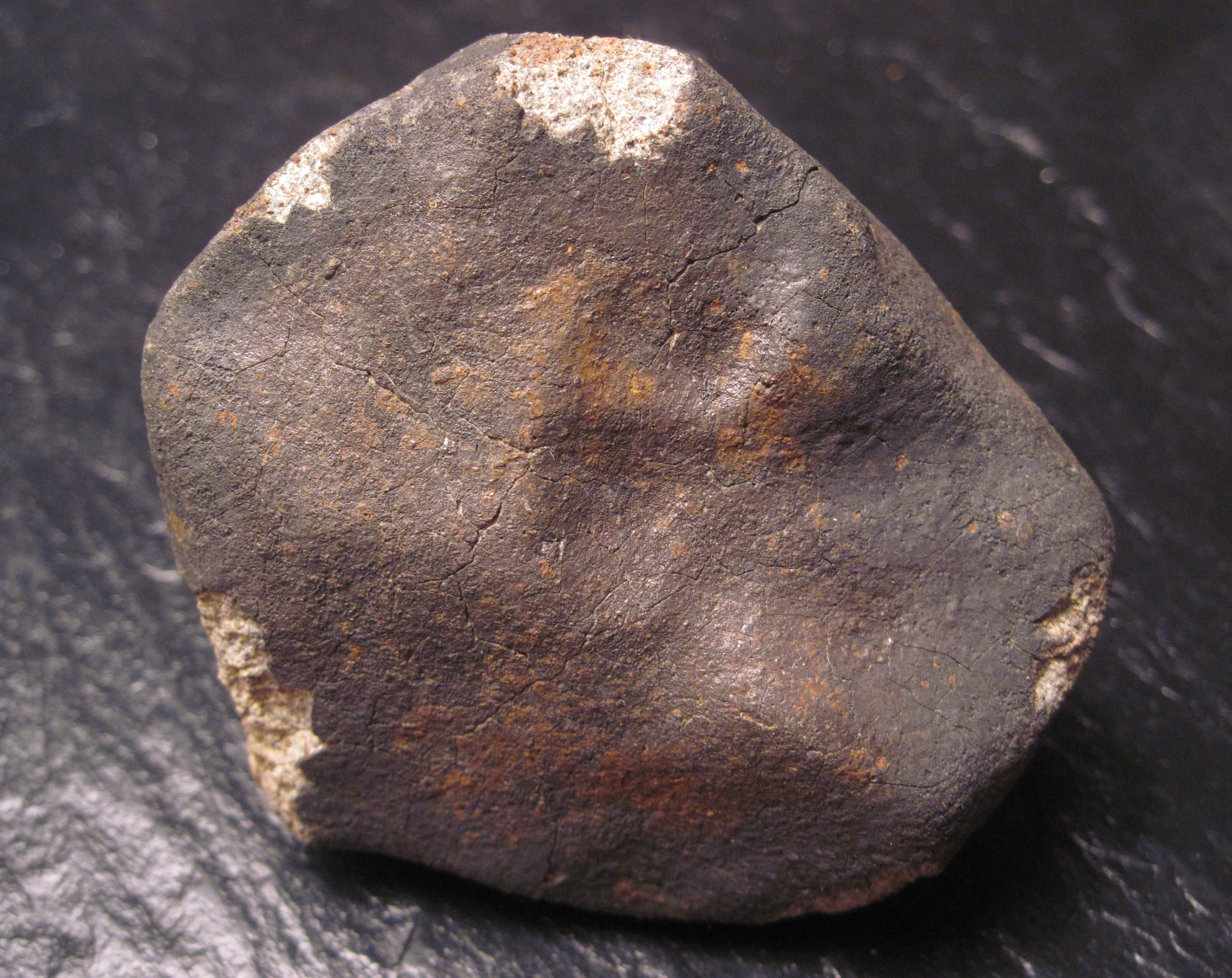
308 g sample

== See also ==
- Glossary of meteoritics
