= Sapouy =

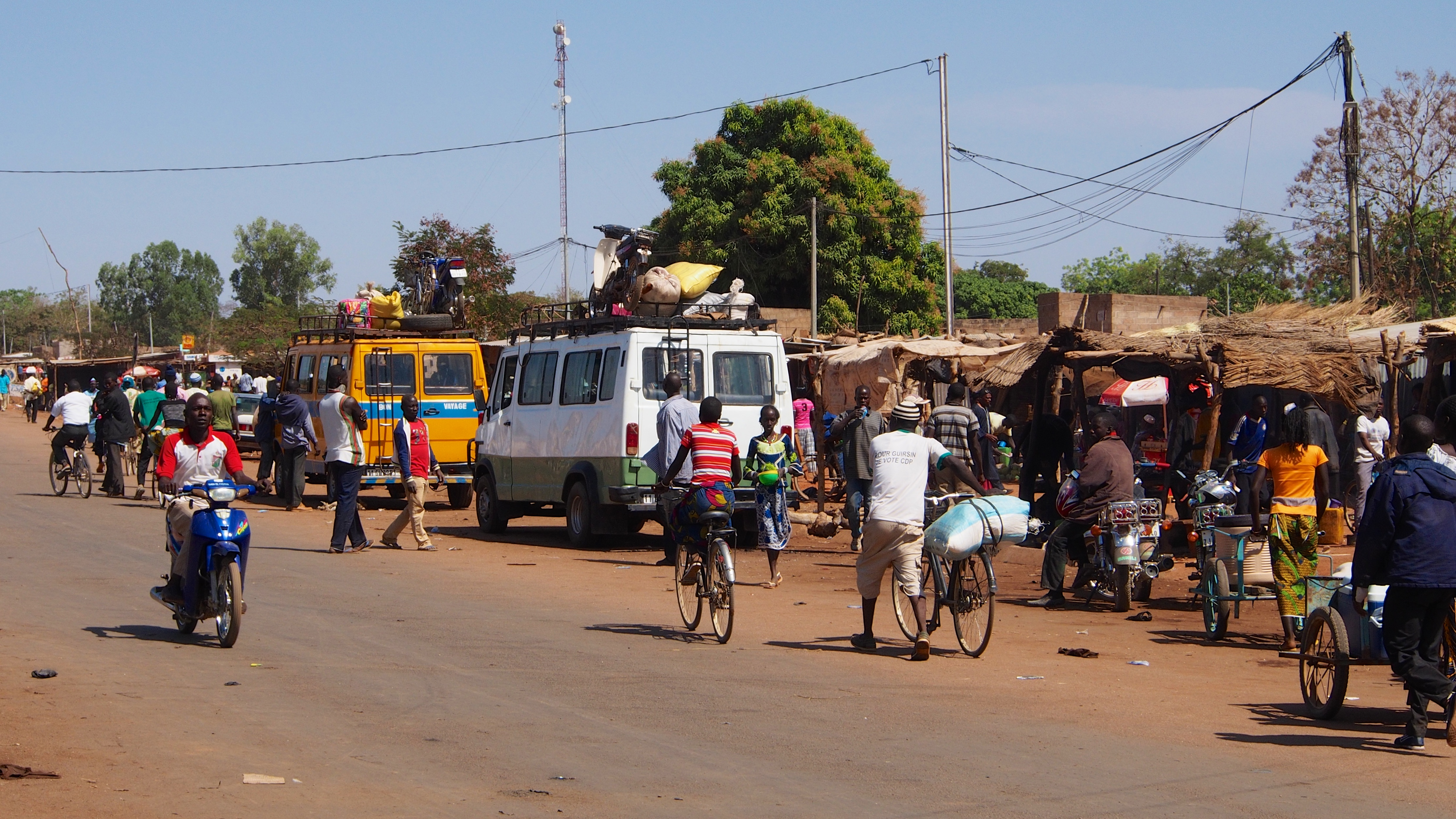
- Market and bus terminal in Sapouy

- Location within Burkina Faso, West Africa
- Coordinates: 11°33′16″N 1°46′25″W
- Country: Burkina Faso
- Elevation: 309 m (1,014 ft)

Population (2019 census)
  - Total: 26,345
- Time zone: UTC+0 (GMT)

Sapouy is the capital of the province of Ziro in Burkina Faso. It is the capital of Ziro Province. The town is on the N6 highway which connects the national capital, Ouagadougou and Léo, the capital of Sissili Province.

It was notably the site of the murder of investigative journalist Norbert Zongo in 1998.
