= Goah, Pakistan =

Goah
- Location within Pakistan
- Coordinates: 33°13′8″N 71°47′20″E
- Country: Pakistan
- Province: Punjab
- Elevation: 406 m (1,332 ft)
- Time zone: UTC+5 (PST)

Goah is a village in the Punjab province of Pakistan. It is located at 33°13'8N 71°47'20E with an altitude of 406 metres (1,332 ft).
