= Gao (department) =

- Department
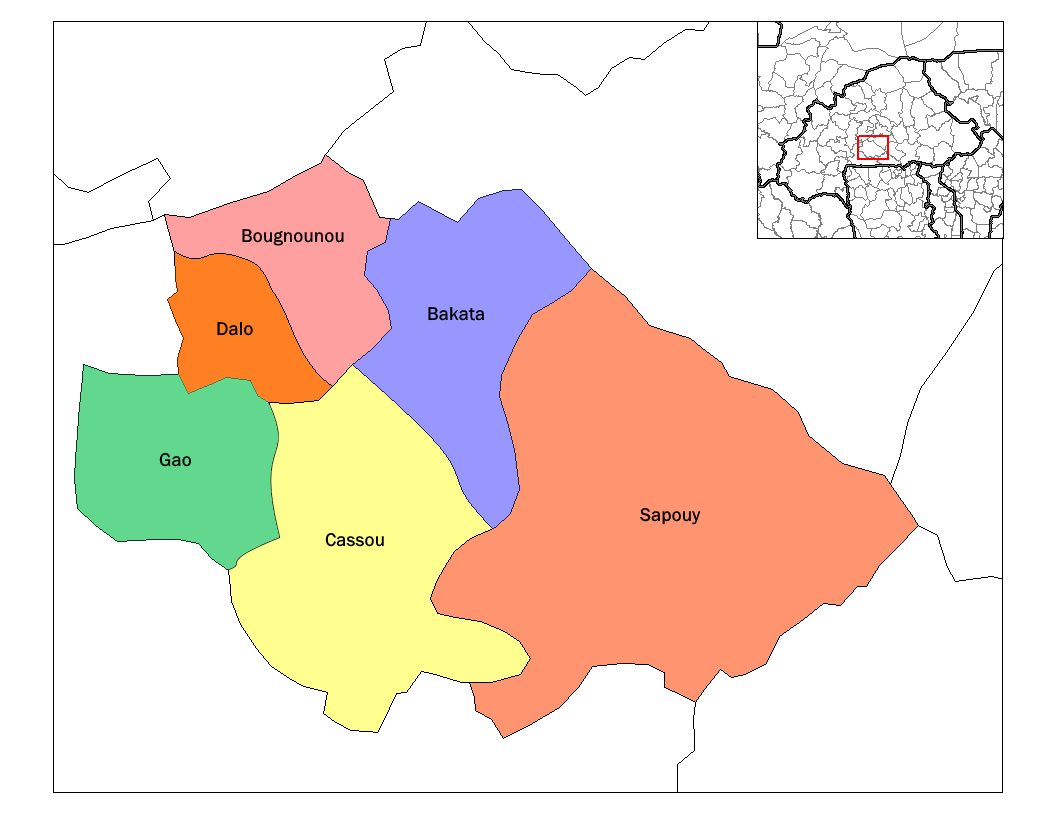
- Gao Department location in the province
- Country: Burkina Faso
- Region: Centre-Ouest Region
- Province: Ziro Province

Population (2019 census)
  - Total: 26,453
- Time zone: UTC+0 (GMT 0)

Gao is a department or commune of Ziro Province in Burkina Faso.

== Cities ==
The department consists of a chief town :

- Gao

and 8 villages:

- Dao
- lerou
- Mao Nessira
- Pani
- Passin
- Tékrou
- Yinga
- Zoro.
