= Geneva Amateur Operatic Society =

Swiss English-language musical theatre group

GAOS
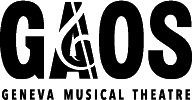
- Formation: June 24, 1971
- Type: Theatre group
- Purpose: Musical theatre
- Location: Geneva, Switzerland
- Members: 275
- Website: www.gaos.ch

The Geneva Amateur Operatic Society (GAOS, Geneva Musical Theatre) is an English-language musical theatre company that began as a light opera group. It also has performed a pantomime nearly every year.

Based in Geneva, Switzerland, GAOS was founded in 1971 by a small group of musical theatre enthusiasts. They produce about three productions per season, including their traditional British-style pantomime in the winter. GAOS is a nonprofit organization, its members receive no payment, and the society gives substantial donations to various charities around Geneva.

== Productions ==
- 1971 Trial by Jury (concert version)
- 1972 The Mikado, The Beggar's Opera, Jack and the Beanstalk (panto)
- 1973 The Pirates of Penzance, Puss in Boots (panto)
- 1974 Ruddigore, Aladdin (panto), Babes in the Wood (panto)
- 1975 Iolanthe, Dick Whittington (panto)
- 1976 The Gondoliers, A Soirée at the Salle, Cinderella (panto)
- 1977 Bluebeard, Old Time Music Hall, Mother Goose (panto)
- 1978 The Boy Friend, Old Time Music Hall, Ali Baba (panto)
- 1979 H.M.S. Pinafore, Old Time Music Hall, Goldilocks and the Three Bears (panto)
- 1980 Brigadoon, Music Hall Revue, Sleeping Beauty (panto)
- 1981 Princess Ida, Old Time Music Hall, Little Red Riding Hood (panto)
- 1982 The Vagabond King, Old Time Music Hall, The Frog Prince (panto)
- 1983 The Yeomen of the Guard, Old Time Music Hall, Snow White and the Seven Dwarfs (panto)
- 1984 Orpheus in the Underworld, Old Time Music Hall, Sinbad the Sailor (panto)
- 1985 The White Horse Inn, 10th Old Time Music Hall, Pinocchio (panto)
- 1986 The Merry Widow, Music Hall, Little Miss Muffet (panto)
- 1987 The Pirates of Penzance (excerpts), Oklahoma!, Old Time Music Hall, Aladdin (panto)
- 1988 Die Fledermaus, Old Time Music Hall, Peter Pan (panto)
- 1989 The Music Man, Old Time Music Hall, My Fair Lady (excerpts), King Arthur (panto)
- 1990 My Fair Lady, Old Time Music Hall, Travelin', Humpty Dumpty (panto)
- 1991 The Mikado, Old Time Music Hall, The Andrew Lloyd Webber Story, The Ice Maiden (panto)
- 1992 Salad Days, Old Time Music Hall, Jack and the Beanstalk (panto)
- 1993 The Gypsy Baron, Old Time Music Hall, Carousel (excerpts), Puss-in-Boots (panto)
- 1994 West Side Story, Summer Follies, Robinson Crusoe (panto)
- 1995 Fiddler on the Roof, Old Time Music Hall, Santa in Space (panto)
- 1996 La Périchole, Another Summer Folly, La Périchole at Waterford Festival of Light Opera, Cinderella (panto)
- 1997 Anything Goes, The Wind in the Willows
- 1998 The Pirates of Penzance, Cruising, The Wizard of Oz
- 1999 Carousel, Old Time Music Hall, Babes in the Wood (panto)
- 2000 Guys and Dolls, Thank You for the Music, Beauty and the Beast (panto)
- 2001 The Gondoliers, A Funny Thing Happened on the Way to the Forum, A Slice of Saturday Night, A Christmas Carol
- 2002 Me and My Girl, Showtime, Dick Whittington (panto)
- 2003 High Society, A Slice of Saturday Night, The Water Nymph (panto)
- 2004 Oliver!, Joseph and the Amazing Technicolor Dreamcoat, Sleeping Beauty (panto)
- 2005 Iolanthe, Old Time Musical, Grease, Alice in Wonderland (panto)
- 2006 Hello Dolly!, To Hell With Opera, Annie, Ali Baba (panto)
- 2007 Follies, Up The Empire!, Fiddler on the Roof, Snow White (panto)
- 2008 Kiss Me, Kate, Guys and Dolls, Aladdin (panto)
- 2009 Chess, Thoroughly Modern Millie, Red Riding Hood (panto)
- 2010 The Sound of Music, Beauty and The Beast Jr., Cinderella (panto)
- 2011 The Producers, Mulan Jr., Jack and The Beanstalk (panto)
- 2012 HMS Pinafore, From Flappers To Rappers, Oklahoma!, Sinbad the Sailor (panto)
- 2013 Chicago, West Side Story, Goldilocks and the Three Bears (panto)
- 2014 Cats, Hairspray, Once Upon a Time (panto)
- 2015 Cabaret, The Addams Family, Sinbad (panto), Rumpelstiltskin (panto)
- 2016 Chitty Chitty Bang Bang, Hair, Puss in Boots (panto)
- 2017 Lets Face the Music, Legally Blonde, The Wizard of Oz
- 2018 South Pacific, The Best of Broadway, The Little Mermaid (panto)
- 2019 Into the Woods, Grease, The Wind in the Willows
- 2020 Robin Hood (online panto)
- 2021 Little Shop of Horrors, Cinderella (panto)
- 2022 For the Boys, A Night at the Musicals, Sleeping Beauty (panto)
- 2023 Sister Act, High School Musical
- 2024 Pinocchio (panto), Rent, TWENTY, Aladdin (panto)
- 2025 Jesus Christ Superstar, Les Misérables School Edition, Elf the Musical
