= Niaré =

Niaré is a surname and given name. Notable people with the name include:

== Surname ==
- Gaëlle Niaré (born 1982), French athlete
- Haby Niaré (born 1993), French taekwondo practitioner
- Namakoro Niaré (born 1943), Malian discus thrower
- Yves Niaré (1977–2012), French shot putter

== Given name ==
- Niaré Benogo (born 1992), Malian footballer
