= Goa, Burkina Faso =

Coordinates: 12.6064°N 2.8958°W

Goa is a village in the province of Nayala in Burkina Faso. Goa has a population of 651.
