= Goa, Botswana =

Town in North-West District, Botswana

Coordinates: 18°17′S 21°50′E

Goa is a small town in Botswana. It lies near the Namibian border, near the Caprivi Strip, and about 11 kilometres from Shakawe which is also the nearest airport.

== Statistics ==
- Elevation = 999m
