= Fifth Battle of Gao =

2013 battle

Coordinates: 16.2667°N 0.0500°W

- Part of Northern Mali conflict
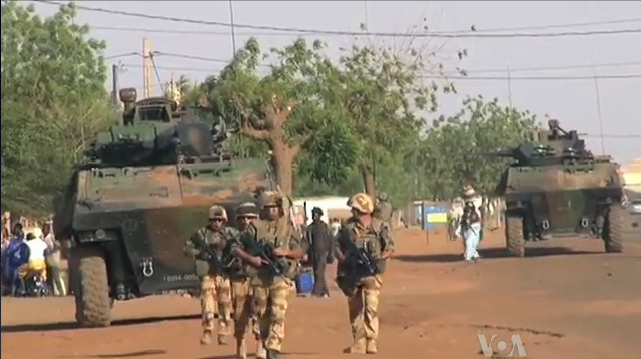
- French soldiers and VBCIs to Gao in March or April 2013.
Date	24 March 2013
Location	Gao, Mali
Result	French-Malian Victory

Belligerents
Mali; France; Niger; Guinea	MOJWA

Strength
Unknown	9+ terrorists

Casualties and losses
(Mali) : 1 killed 4 wounded	4 killed 3 wounded
- 4 civilians killed

On March 23, 2013, a battle took place in Gao between MUJAO and Malian army. The Malian army repelled the attack.

== The battle ==
On March 23, the Malian and French forces conduct a search operation on the island of Bera, capturing nine people suspected to be connected to MOJWAO. A few hours later, on the night of March 23–24, a MOJWAO fighters raided the city of Gao, defended by the Malian, Nigerian and French armies based at Gao airport, as well as 160 Guinean soldiers who arrived in the city three days earlier. During the fighting, MOJWAO retreated, but later returned in the battle by the Niger river. The fighting ended when city residents took up arms against the Islamists. During the battle, four Islamist were killed, and two wounded, as well as 1 Malian soldier killed, and four wounded. Four civilians were also killed.
