= Second Battle of Gao =

2013 battle during the Northern Mali Conflict

Coordinates: 16.2667°N 0.0500°W

- Part of Northern Mali conflict
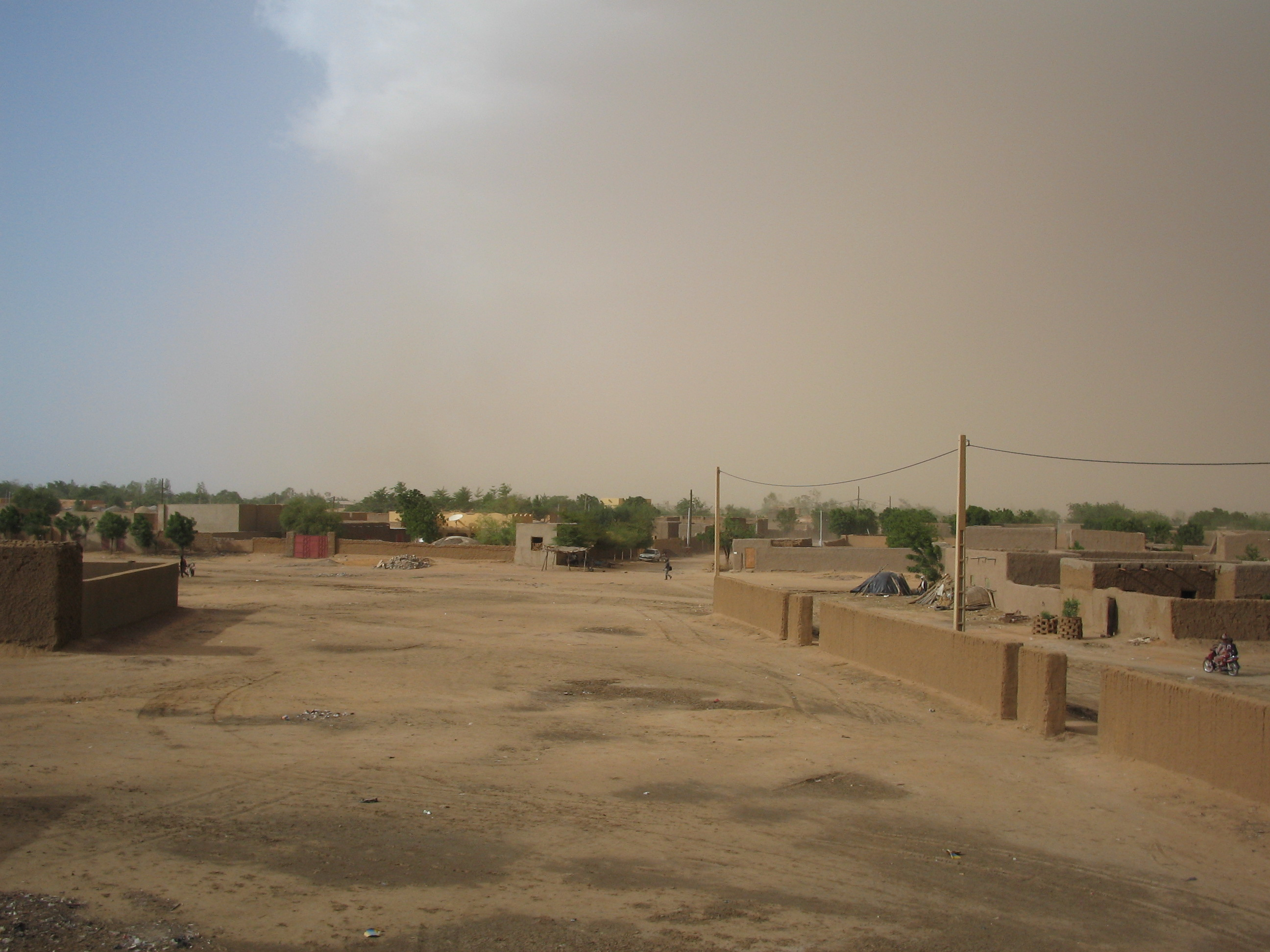
Date	25–27 January 2013 (2 days)
Location	Gao, Mali
Result	French Victory

Belligerents
France; Mali	MOJWA

Commanders and leaders
(France) Paul Geze	Abdel Hakim; Aliou Muhammar Touré

Strength
88 men 1 attack helicopter	60 terrorists

Casualties and losses
2 wounded	25 killed

The Second Battle of Gao was the recapture of the city of Gao from Islamist MOJWA fighters by Malian/French forces. It took place in January 2013 within the Northern Mali Conflict.

== Prelude ==
A few days after taking the towns of Konna and Diabaly, the French and Malian forces continued their progress on Timbuktu and Gao. In the latter city, about 60 Islamists were killed on January 13 by French bombing according to testimonies of inhabitants. Three days before the attack, a hundred special forces commandos were sent to the scene. After the capture of Diabaly, the special forces advanced in Gao, the largest city in northern Mali, with a population of about 100,000. Between 21 and 24 January, the French traveled 500 kilometers, while the road being monitored by the air force, and finally stopped in the evening of 24 a few dozen kilometers from Gao.

== Forces in presence ==
MUJAO forces still present in Gao were no longer very important, with about 60 fighters divided into two groups defended the Wabaria Bridge which guard the southern entrance of the city. The first group is posted at the level of a toll, the second is placed further upstream. To take the city, the French army engages in front line its special forces (COS). About fifty men are responsible for taking the bridge, others the airport. A total of 88 Special Forces soldiers took in the fighting in Gao. They had come mainly from the 1st Marine Infantry Parachute Regiment (1st RPIMa) and Air Parachute Commando No. 10 (CPA-10). This force was supported by two Tiger helicopters and two Gazelle helicopters, while five Puma helicopters were tasked with carrying six groups of marine commandos. Behind the special forces, an important 15-kilometer French-Malian column is also moving on Gao. However, it will not take part in the fight, the action of the special forces proving sufficient to drive the jihadists out of the city. The French side is close to 100 soldiers with six ERC-90 armored vehicles. The Malian army engaged for its 466 soldiers commanded by Colonel Samaké with two BM-21 and fifty pick-up. In total, the column counts 563 Malian and French soldiers and 93 vehicles.

== Taking of the bridge of Wabaria ==
The fight began the night of 25 to 26 January, during the day French soldiers took position and snipers were placed on a hill overlooking the village of Wabaria and the river. The city is watched from the sky by C-130 and Atlantic planes. Shortly before midnight, the men of the 1st RPIMa go to the entrance of the Wabaria bridge. The jihadists then send a pickup loaded with explosive, but it is destroyed in an impressive explosion by the French fire when it comes to about five meters from their position. A motorcycle is also destroyed and four jihadists are killed. Supported by the snipers, the men of the 1st RPIMa and the CAP-10 take control of the south entrance of the bridge, but they prefer not to go further for fear of traps. For their part, Rafale aircraft intervene three times and hit several buildings in the area, they also destroy an armored BRDM-2.

== Capturing the airport ==
On January 25, around 7 pm, the attack on Gao airport began with the striking of fighter planes against six buildings and two BTR-60 armored vehicles that were destroyed. Then at 0.50 am, two Puma helicopters dropped off about 10 CAP-10 soldiers to assess the runway 13. Gao airport is not defended by the jihadists, however, the latter have abandoned on the track of the PT-76 light tank carcasses, hoping to prevent any landing. Despite this, a space is identified as sufficient to allow the aircraft of the Poitou squadron to land. Within minutes, and despite the darkness, the dust and the carcasses of the armored vehicles, three C-160 Transall aircraft and a C-130 Hercules aircraft made an assault landing and managed to land men and equipment before taking off again. The French commandos are then in control of the airport without having to fight, to their surprise they find that the jihadists did not pose any trap on the spot. A few hours later, three other planes assaulted and landed 144 men of the 1st regiment of paratroopers (1st RCP). The latter take over from the special forces and take charge of the airport.

== Skirmishes in Wabaria ==
At the Wabaria bridge however, fighting resumes in the morning. At 4 am, shortly before dawn, sporadic gunfire took place between the jihadists and the French soldiers supported by helicopters. Residents are also starting to leave their homes to cheer on the soldiers. Some Islamist fighters take advantage of the crowd to hide themselves and approach the French, they are nevertheless recognized and reported by Malian civilians. They try to retreat into the wild, but they are spotted around 7 o'clock. The belligerents oppose in a brief exchange of fire and the four jihadists are all mown down by machine-gun fire. Around 9 am, another pickup loaded with explosive and driven by two suicide bombers, dark on the French troops, but it is also destroyed by machine gun by the soldiers of the special forces. Around 12:30, five jihadist pickups arrive near the Wabaria bridge. They are however spotted and a sniper opens fire with two bullets. One of them touches a supply of ammunition in the back of a vehicle, causing a strong explosion. Ten Islamist fighters then abandon their pickups and retreat. The fugitives are hunted for nearly four hours, the French open fire with a machine gun, a mortar and even a Tiger helicopter, but the jihadists manage to escape, only two of them are wounded by a sniper.

== Capture of Gao ==
On January 26, Gao Airport and Wabaria Bridge were under control. However, the city, located 6 kilometers from the airport, is not immediately attacked. Throughout the day of January 26, Special Forces soldiers and paratroopers camp on their positions. However, jihadists are still present in the area, gunshots and explosions occasionally break out. Meanwhile, the Franco-Malian column set in motion and advance on Gao. The French were commanded by a battalion commander of the 3rd Marine Infantry Parachute Regiment (3rd RPIMa) and the Malians by Colonel Major Didier Dacko. On January 26, around 6 o'clock in the morning, the first elements of the column make their junction at Douentza with the 466 men of Colonel Samake. The Malians and the French continue their route for 400 kilometers and finally reach the Wabaria bridge on January 27 at around 3 am. Reinforcements take over from COS forces. After two hours of rest, the soldiers cross the bridge and connect with the parachute fighters stationed at the airport. The Malian special forces and the French army then enter the morning in the city of Gao, abandoned by the jihadists. The Malian and French soldiers are welcomed as liberators by the population of Gao. However, in the following days acts of revenge are committed by residents, especially against Tuareg and Arabs. Looting is taking place and people suspected of being close to MUJAO have been injured or arrested. The men of MUJAO abandon Gao, but in the evening, around 22 hours, two pickups are spotted and attacked north of the city by a Tiger helicopter from Ouagadougou. The two vehicles are destroyed and their 10 occupants are killed according to Colonel Thierry Burkhard, spokesman for the French General Staff. But according to Jean-Christophe Notin, the number of jihadists killed is more precisely 13.
