= Ziro Province =

Coordinates: 11°35′N 1°55′W

Ziro
- Province
- Location in Burkina Faso

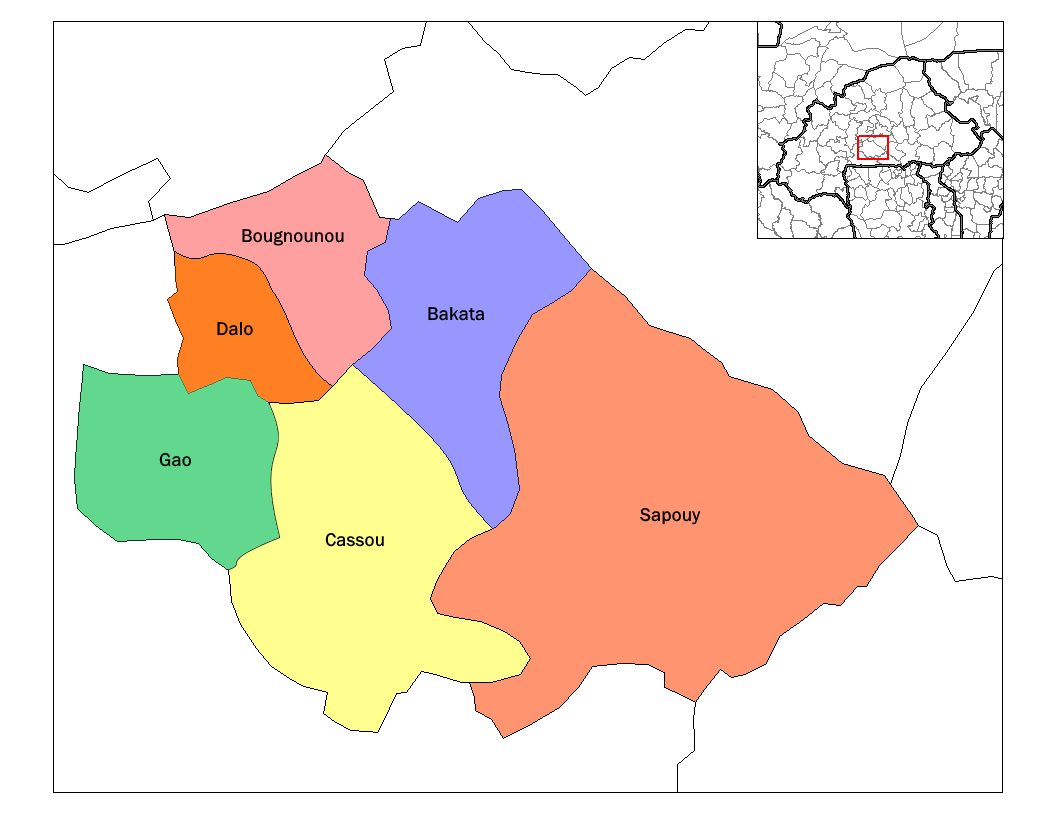
- Provincial map of its departments
- Country: Burkina Faso
- Region: Centre-Ouest Region
- Capital: Sapouy

Area
  - Province: 5,128 km^{2} (1,980 sq mi)

Population (2019 census)
  - Province: 241,663
  - Density: 47.13/km^{2} (122.1/sq mi)
  - Urban: 26,345
- Time zone: UTC+0 (GMT 0)

For the town in India, see Ziro.

Ziro is a province of Burkina Faso, located in its Centre-Ouest Region. It has an area of 5,139 square kilometres (1,984 sq mi). The provincial capital is the town of Sapouy.

== Education ==
In 2011 the province had 0 primary schools and 0 secondary schools.

== Healthcare ==
In 2011 the province had 17 health and social promotion centers (Centres de santé et de promotion sociale), 2 doctors and 47 nurses.

== Demographics ==
Population growth
| | 1985 | 1996 | 2006 | 2011 |
|---|---|---|---|---|
| Ziro | 88,514 | 119,219 | 172,559 | 207,079 (est.) |

== Administrative divisions ==
Prior to 2004 Ziro was divided into three departments: Bougnounou, Cassou and Sapouy. After the 2004 reorganization Ziro was divided into six departments, listed with their administrative seat, and population as of 2006 census.

| Department | Capital | Population (Census 2006) |
|---|---|---|
| Bougnounou Department | Bougnounou | 21,202 |
| Cassou Department | Cassou | 40,038 |
| Sapouy Department | Sapouy | 55,968 |
| Gao Department | Gao | 19,884 |
| Dalo Department | Dalo | 10,746 |
| Bakata Department | Bakata | 28,077 |

== See also ==
- Regions of Burkina Faso
- Provinces of Burkina Faso
- Departments of Burkina Faso
