= Nayala Province =

Coordinates: 12°38′N 4°25′W

Nayala
- Province
- Location in Burkina Faso

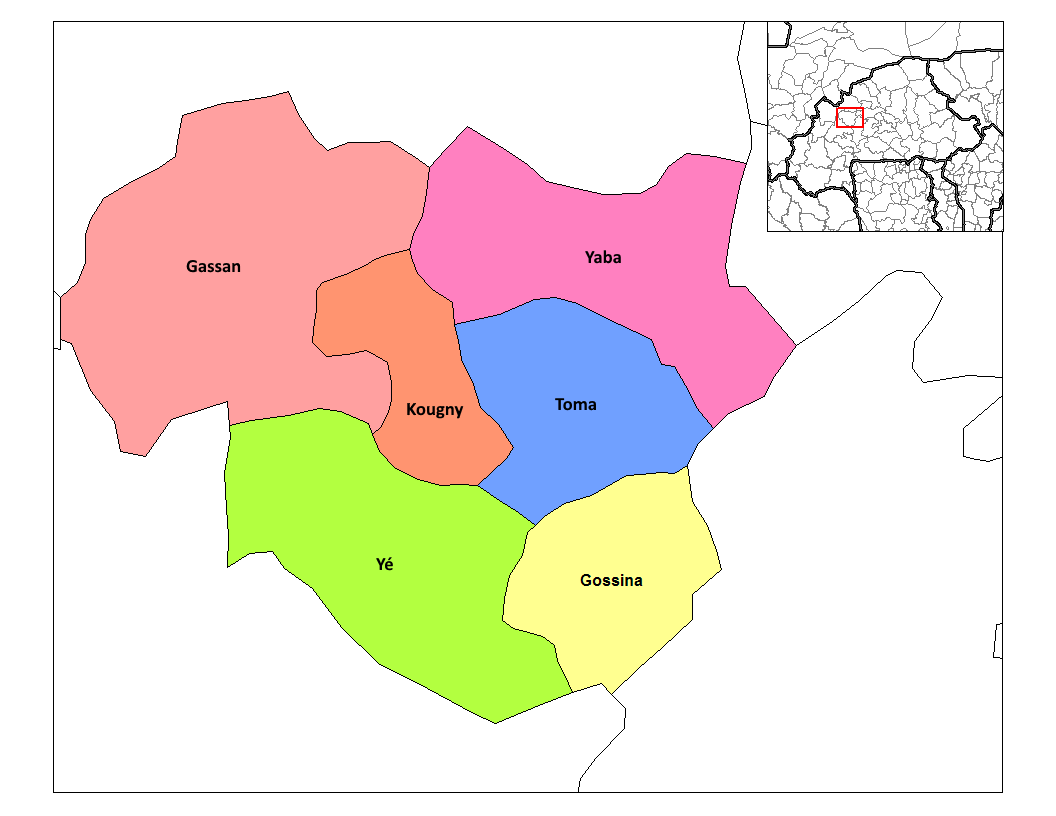
- Provincial map of its departments
- Country: Burkina Faso
- Region: Boucle du Mouhoun
- Capital: Toma

Area
  - Province: 1,515 sq mi (3,923 km^{2})

Population (2019 census)
  - Province: 223,090
  - Density: 147.3/sq mi (56.87/km^{2})
  - Urban: 15,851
- Time zone: UTC+0 (GMT 0)

Nayala is one of the 45 provinces of Burkina Faso and is in Boucle du Mouhoun Region.

Its capital is Toma.

== Education ==
In 2011 the province had 133 primary schools and 20 secondary schools.

== Healthcare ==
In 2011 the province had 20 health and social promotion centers (Centres de santé et de promotion sociale), 3 doctors and 72 nurses.

== Departments ==
Nayala is divided into 6 departments:

The Departments of Nayala
Departments	Capitals	Population (Census 2006)
Gassan Department	Gassan	32,253
Gossina Department	Gossina	18,499
Kougny Department	Kougny	15,818
Toma Department	Toma	29,003
Yaba Department	Yaba	31,579
Yé Department	Yé	35,718

== See also ==
- Regions of Burkina Faso
- Provinces of Burkina Faso
- Departments of Burkina Faso
