= Islamic manuscripts =

Islamic writing system

Islamic manuscripts had a variety of functions ranging from Qur'anic recitation to scientific notation. These manuscripts were produced in many different ways depending on their use and period. Parchment (vellum) was a common way to produce manuscripts. Manuscript creators eventually transitioned to using paper in later centuries with the diffusion of paper-making in the Islamic empire. When Muslims encountered paper in Central Asia, its use and production spread to Iran, Iraq, Syria, Egypt, and North Africa during the 8th century.

The Al-Furqan Islamic Heritage Foundation has estimated that 3 million Islamic manuscripts have survived. Other academics talk of 7 million surviving manuscripts out of 90 million manuscripts written between the 7th and 14th centuries. The estimates vary due to several challenges, such as limited access to manuscripts located in conflict zones or held in private libraries.

== Scripts ==
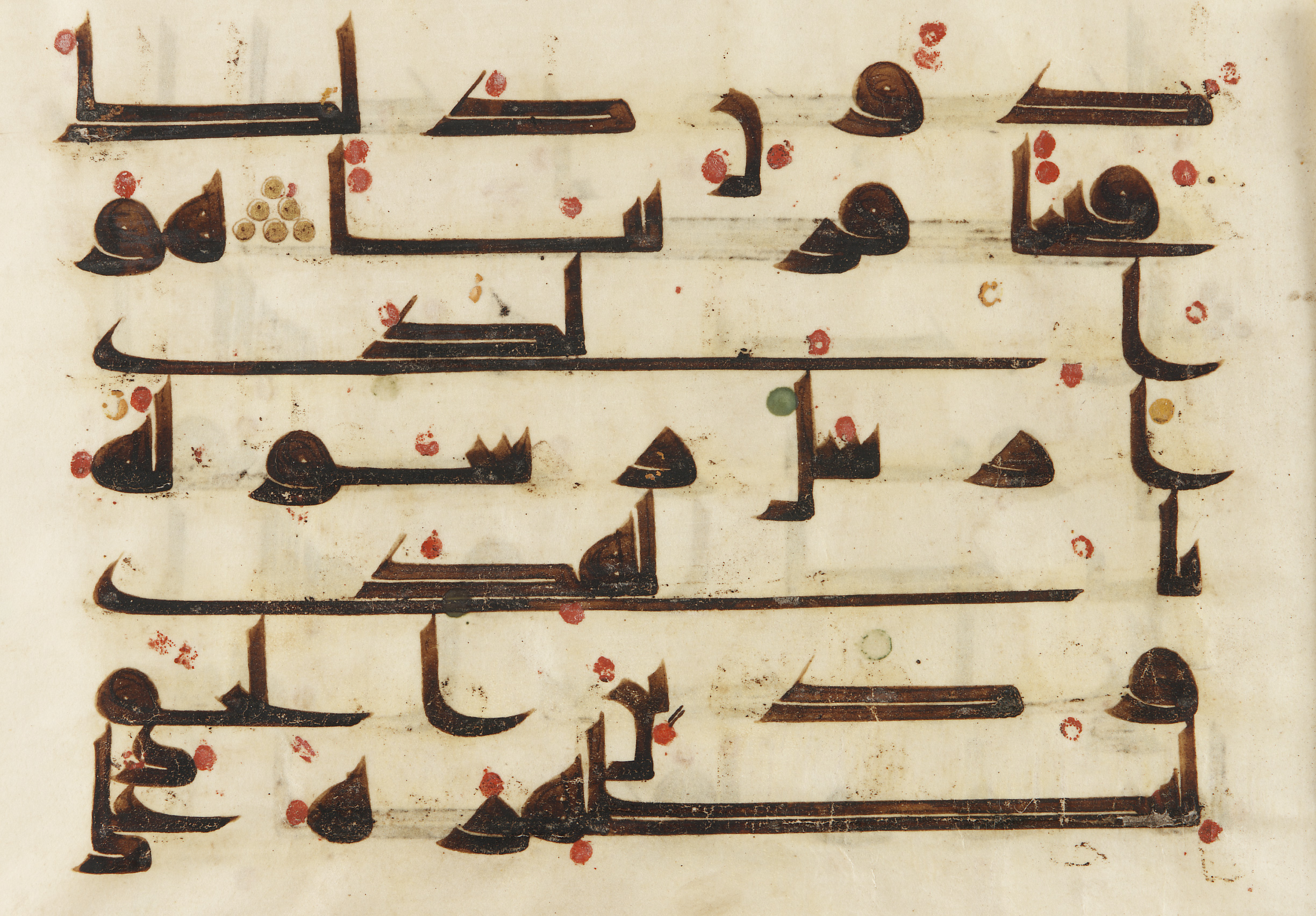
Kufic script, 8th or 9th century (Surah 48: 27–28) Qur'an.

The development of scripts in the Islamic empire demonstrates the transition from an oral culture to convey information to a written form. Traditionally speaking in the Islamic empire, Arabic calligraphy was the common form of recording texts. Calligraphy is the practice or art of decorative handwriting. The demand for calligraphy in the early stages of the Islamic empire (circa 7–8th century CE) can be attributed to a need to produce Qur'an manuscripts. During the Umayyad period, Kufic scripts were typically seen in Qur'an manuscripts.

However, Arabic was only one of the scripts used for recording religious manuscripts. In the Indian subcontinent, for example, Nizari Ismailis utilized the Khwajah Sindhi (Khojki) script, which was closely associated with their identity. The specific form of this script was exclusively used by Nizari Ismailis, who were known as Khwajahs or Khojas. Recording religious literature in this script had the added benefit of preserving it from potentially hostile eyes.

== Genres ==
Islamic manuscripts include a variety of topics, such as religion, medicine, astrology, and literature.

=== Religious Manuscripts ===
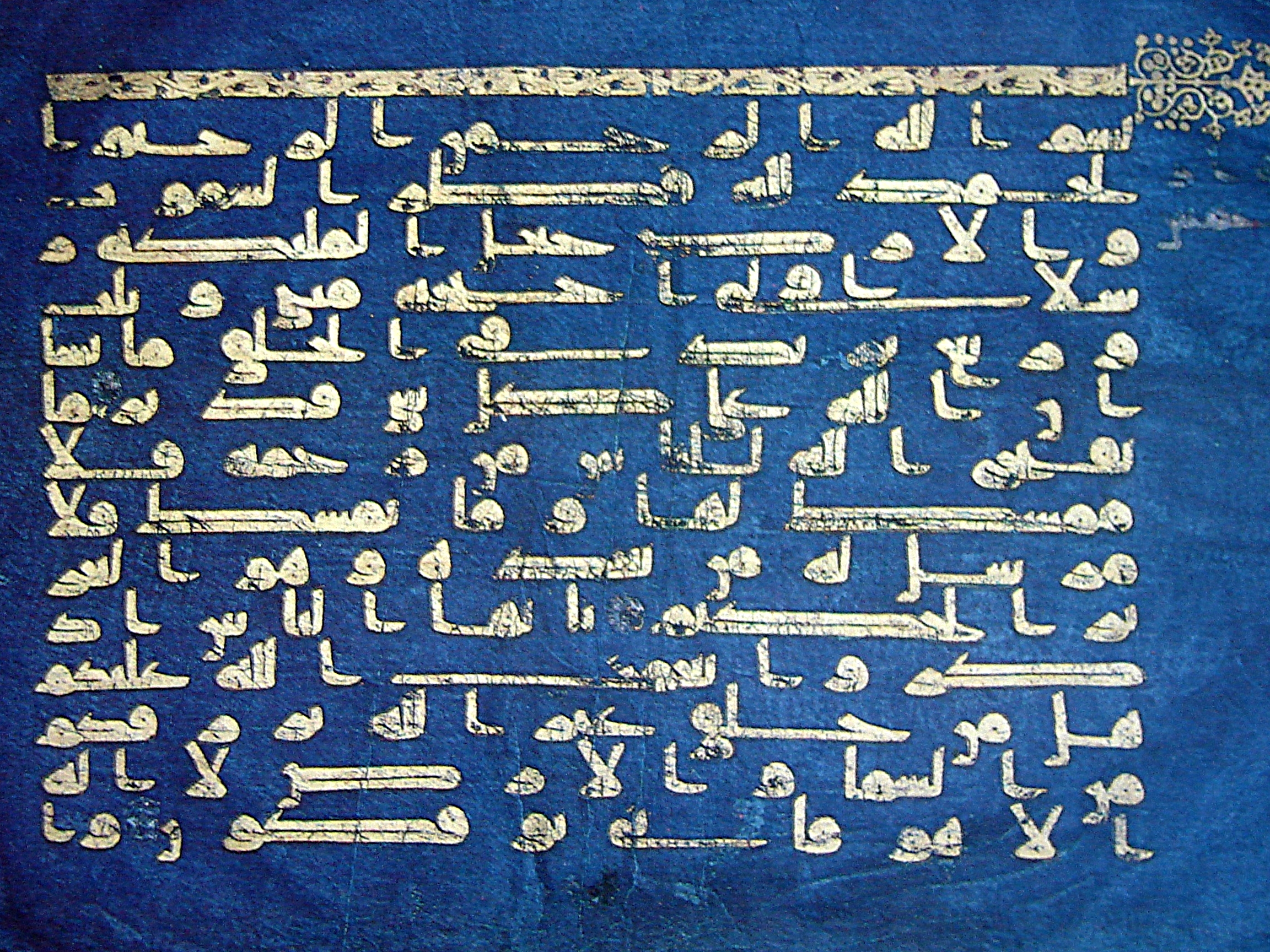
Blue Qu'ran, 9–10th century manuscript

A common religious manuscript would be a copy of the Qur'an, which is the sacred book of Islam. The Qur'an is believed by Muslims to be a divine revelation (the word of god) to Muhammad, revealed to him by Archangel Gabriel. Qur'anic manuscripts can vary in form and function. Certain manuscripts were larger in size for ceremonial purposes, others being smaller and more transportable. An example of a Qur'an manuscript is the Blue Qur'an. The Blue Qur'an is ceremonial in nature, which a Hafiz would utilize. It has gold Kufic script, on parchment dyed blue with indigo. Many Qur'an manuscripts are divided into 30 equal sections (juz) to be able to be read over the course of 30 days. The Chinese practice of writing on paper, presented to the Islamic world around the 8th century CE, enabled the writing of the Qur'an on paper. The decrease in production costs of Qur'an manuscripts due to the transition from parchment to paper enabled Qur'ans to be utilized more frequently for personal use or worship, rather than just ceremonial settings.

Within the Nizari Ismaili community, manuscripts were recorded in the Khwajah Sindhi (Khojki) script, as mentioned above. A common type of literature recorded in this script is known as Ginans. These are commonly in the form of devotional hymns recited by members of the community. The script also preserves other types of religious literature, such as songs of devotions in praise of Prophet Muhammed and legends about the Prophets.

==== Evolution of Qur'anic Calligraphy and Technique ====
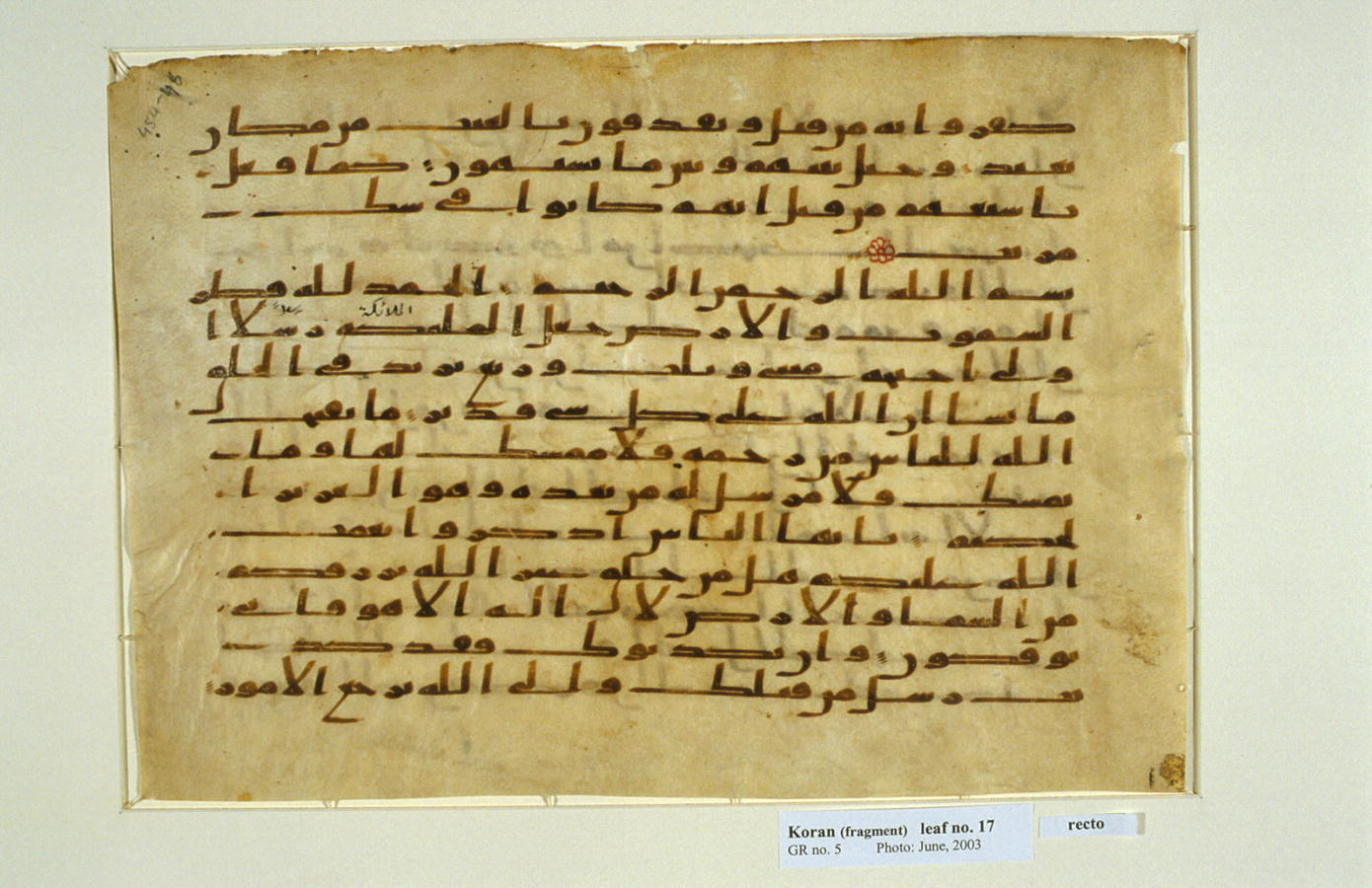
Hijazi script from an 8th-century Qur'anic manuscript

Manuscripts of the Qu'ran have been created and copied since the Umayyad period (661–750CE). Over the course of this period, copies of Qur'anic manuscripts were produced in Damascus and were named the "Damascus papers." Some parts of the Damascus Papers contained hijazi script which was unique to each calligrapher's writing style. Hijazi script disregarded the use of short vowels and was created to serve as a memory aid to reciters. Manuscripts with Hijazi script also utilized the rules of scripto continua and displayed no decoration or ornamentation. Under the reign of Umayyad caliph, Abd-al-Malik (685–705), Qur'anic script was standardized and inserted onto other surfaces such as marble as a way to promote Arabic in the region. One example of marble inscription is seen inside the Dome of the Rock in Jerusalem. When paper-making set its course towards central Asia, paper became the preferred material setting for Qur'anic manuscripts. The use of paper amplified the development of new writing styles and motivated calligraphers to heighten the manuscripts' aesthetic appeal. Kufic script had been used as the main style of scripture until about 1200 CE. After the turn of the 13th century, calligraphers began to prefer writing styles such as naskh to transcribe the Qu'ran. Before the fourteenth century, calligraphers were responsible for both the text and illumination of Qur'anic manuscripts until the artwork became more complex and required its own specialist.

==== Structure and Order of Qur'anic Manuscripts ====
In the making of Qur'anic manuscripts, early calligraphers used a strict set of geometric rules. For example, each page had a space reserved for writing which was divided into perfectly equal and parallel lines depending on thickness of the pen. A set of key ratios was also used to determine the box's width and height. After the structure of the text box was determined, calligraphers followed an interline system to write out the script. Early Qur'anic manuscripts did not have a direct textual structure. To amplify oration and make recitation easier, illuminators created a decorative vocabulary. At first, the illuminators differentiated each surah by pairing it with a unique geometric band. Subsequently, a more complex system was put in place in order to organize the Qur'an's contents and help individuals read and recite the text. This system included motifs (aya), chapters (surah), and primary divisions (juz) that are seen between each thirty sections and organize the singular text into different parts. The Qur'an now contains 114 surahs with a range of three to 268 verses.

==== Evolution of Illumination ====
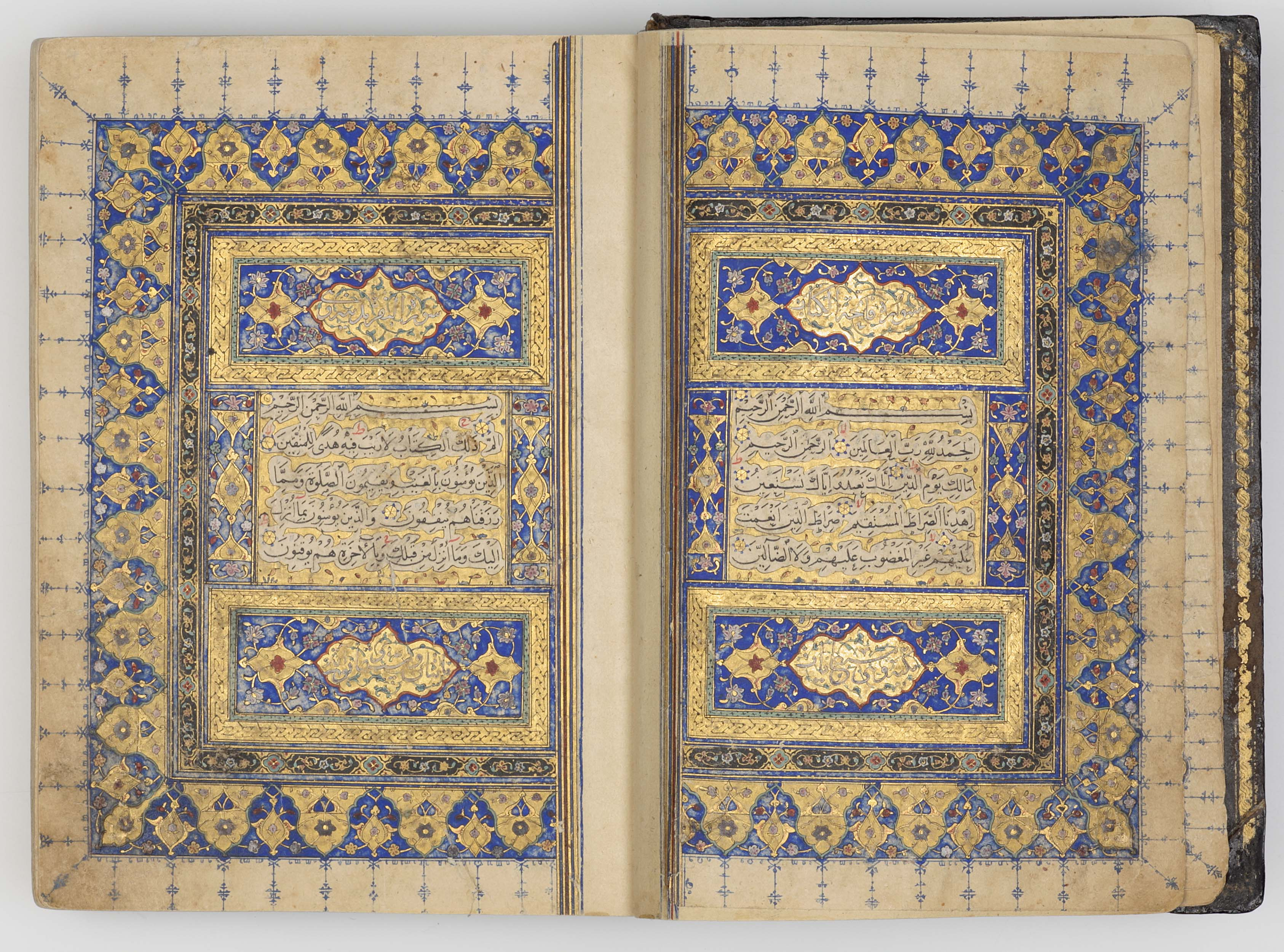
Single-volume Qur'an 15th century manuscript from the Timurid Dynasty

During the recitation of Qur'anic manuscripts, the frontispiece was presented to the audience in order to display the beautiful illumination. These illuminations usually use geometry, and nature as inspiration and don't display any sort of iconography due to the values of Islam. Early illuminators had to create the perfect sense of symbolism and ornamentation to represent each section of text while keeping the text as the main focal point. In the eighth century, when the Qur'an was first produced as a codex, ornamentation was already included in the design. The entire frontispiece of the Qur'an usually contained illumination as well as the borders of the first few folios, the last folios, and the titles of each chapter in the text. The use of illuminated medallions also became popular after the tenth century to indicate each fifth and tenth verse within the text. Around the eleventh century, only the first and last folios out of the entire text were illuminated. The illuminations were typically applied in gold and incorporated geometric and vegetal designs. During the reign of the Mamluk and Ilkhanid dynasties (1250–1517), paper became more accessible and allowed for the production of larger scale Qur'ans. This influenced illuminators to add more complex designs and new motifs. Qur'anic manuscripts produced by Mamluks were noted for gilded foliate scrollwork as well as star-shaped and hexagonal motifs. The Ilkhanid dynasty was responsible for adapting their geometric vocabulary to different sized manuscripts and sense of lavishness in design. The Timurid dynasty (1370–1507) introduced a style of illumination that included fine gilded leaves and stems, red florets, and diamond shaped medallions on a dark-blue background. An example of this style of illumination is seen in this single-volume Qur'an that was made between 1480 and 1500. Manuscripts from the Safavid dynasty (1500–1700) is known for their fine golden and floral scroll illuminations with lapis backgrounds. Additionally, the Safavid dynasty is also known for the Shiraz manuscripts which were large in size and elaborate in design. Illuminators from the Ottoman Empire (1400–1700) were influenced by Timurid illumination and followed their gold and blue floral style. Ottoman illuminators also incorporated rose, hyacinth, and tulip motifs into their illuminations. The Ottomans also built a manufacturing studio in Istanbul where illuminated Qur'ans were produced into the beginning of the twentieth century.

=== Scientific Manuscripts ===
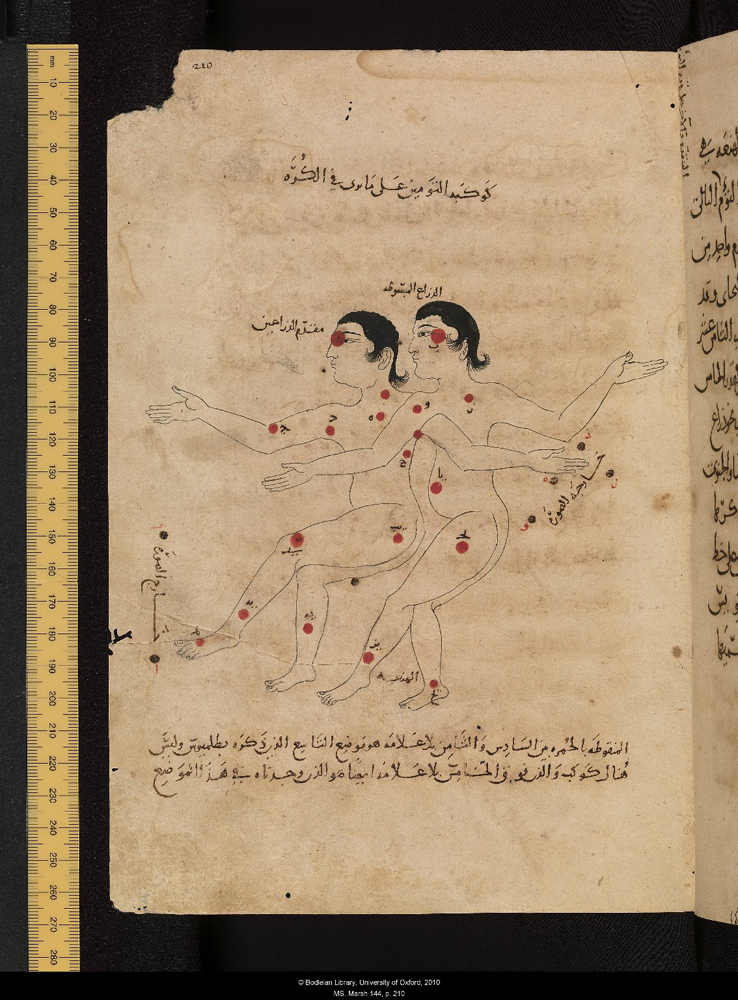
Book of the Fixed Stars, 12th century scientific manuscript

Many early illustrated Arabic manuscripts are affiliated with scientific subjects. Scientific manuscripts discuss a variety of topics including but not limited to astronomy, astrology, anatomy, botany, and zoology. The development of early illustrated scientific manuscripts began under the Islamic Abbasid dynasty in Baghdad in approximately the mid-8th century. The development of new scientific work starting to translation of old Greek scientific and learned works, and the make pure original scholarship in science, medicine, and philosophy in Arabic. An example of an Arabic scientific manuscript is the Book of the Fixed Stars by Abd al-Rahman al-Sufi. This manuscript is a catalog of stars and their constellations, commissioned by the patron the Buyid prince Adud al-Dawla. The Book of the Fixed Stars based most of its content on Ptolemy's Mathēmatikē Syntaxis (Almagest), which was translated from Greek to Arabic during the 9th century. Al-Sufi's included his own observations of Ptolemy's material into this manuscript as well.

==== The Scientific Manuscripts of Timbuktu ====
One of the most significant examples of scientific Islamic manuscripts comes from the Timbuktu Manuscripts. The creation of these manuscripts range from the 13th to the 20th century, with most of them being made during the Mali Empire (1230–1672). Within these manuscripts, there is discussion of several scientific concepts including mathematics, astronomy, astrology, and medicine. Although these are scientific manuscripts, many of them include poetic structure. One example of these scientific manuscripts is Manuscript no. 2262, a work that discusses ideas about astronomy. This manuscript discusses the intersection between solar and lunar calendars. More specifically, this manuscript instructs the reader on how to determine January first of the Islamic Lunar Year 1023. Additionally, the manuscript discusses the process of determining whether or not it is leap year. Another example is Manuscript no. 1045, entitled by scholars as "The Treatment of Illnesses, Internal and External." In this manuscript, the author discusses medical ideas such as: the use of plants for treating illnesses, the use of minerals and their medicinal powers, and the use of animal organs in certain healing processes. Timbuktu Manuscripts are unique due to the sheer volume of manuscripts discovered and their wide range of concepts including concepts of philosophy that contradicted common ideas about Islamic framework.

== Collections ==
=== Khuda Bakhsh Oriental Public Library ===
The Khuda Bakhsh Oriental Library has a collection of 25,000 Islamic Manuscripts including Padshahnama, Tareek ke khandan e timuriya, Divān of Hafez, Safinatul Auliya and Sahih al-Bukhari, hand-transcribed by Shaykh Muhammad ibn Yazdan Bakhsh Bengali in Ekdala, eastern Bengal. The manuscript was a gift to the Sultan of Bengal Alauddin Husain Shah. It is also the only library in the world to have the original manuscripts from the Caliphate of Cordoba.

=== Mamma Haidara Commemorative Library ===
The Mamma Haidara Commemorative Library is a collection of thousands of Islamic manuscripts from Timbuktu. They were moved to Bamako for safekeeping due to the Mali War.

=== The Zaydani Collection ===
The Zaydani Library or Zaydani Collection (Arabic: الخزانة الزيدانية) is a collection of manuscripts belonging to Sultan Zidan Abu Maali of the Saadi dynasty that is located at El Escorial in Spain.

=== Cambridge University Library ===
In the 1630s Cambridge University founded a Professorship in Arabic. The Cambridge University Library collection started with the donation of the Quran by William Bedwell. Since then it has grown to over 5,000 works. It includes collections of Thomas Erpenius, J.L.Burckhardt, E.H.Palmer and E.G. Browne.

=== The British Library ===
The British Library hold a collection of almost 15,000 works in 14,000 volumes. In 1982, the collections of the India Office Library were transferred to the British library.

=== University of Michigan ===
One of the largest collections in North America is at the University of Michigan which holds 1,800 texts contained in over 1,100 volumes.

=== Leipzig University Library ===
The Oriental Manuscripts of the Leipzig University Library are around 3,200 oriental manuscripts in the Leipzig University Library in Leipzig, Germany.

== See also ==
- Timbuktu Manuscripts
- Al-Furqan Islamic Heritage Foundation
