= Abdallah al-Chinguetti =

Mauritanian jihadist

- Birth name: Mohamed Lemine Ould El Hassen
- Born: 1981; Frewa, Trarza, Mauritania
- Died: February 24, 2013; Timetrine, Mali
- Allegiance: AQIM
- Branch: Katiba al-Furqan
- Rank: Emir of Katiba al-Furqan
- Known for: Commander of Katiba al-Furqan, destruction of UNESCO heritage sites in Timbuktu
- Battles / wars: Insurgency in the Sahel Mali War: Fall of Timbuktu (2012); Battle of Timetrine †

Mohamed Lemine Ould El Hassen, nom de guerre Abdallah al-Chinguetti, was a Mauritanian jihadist and commander of Katiba Al Furqan of the Al-Qaeda in the Islamic Maghreb.

== Biography ==
Chinguetti was born in 1981 in Frewa, Trarza, Mauritania. He holds a diploma from 2006 from the Higher Institute of Islamic Studies and Research. He was imprisoned when he gave his thesis due to his membership in a jihadist group during the presidency of Ely Ould Mohamed Vall. Chinguetti served in Al-Qaeda in the Islamic Maghreb, and led a contingent of around a hundred men. Hassen also served as the spokesperson for the southern region controlled by AQIM. On June 24, 2011, he commanded jihadist forces during the battle of the Wagadou Forest against Malian and Mauritanian forces. He also kidnapped several hostages, and affirmed to French journalists that they were well-treated.

Chinguetti was promoted to head of Katiba Al Furqan in November 2012 replacing Djamel Okacha, who was promoted to commander of the Sahara. Chinguetti was the first Mauritanian to command a katiba of AQIM. Katiba Al Furqan became active along the Malian-Mauritanian border. He also served as the spiritual leader of AQIM. During the fall of Timbuktu, Chinguetti and other jihadist leaders ruled the city, with Chinguetti personally ordering the destruction of mausoleums protected by UNESCO.

Chinguetti was killed by French forces on February 24, 2013, during the Battle of Timetrine. AQIM confirmed his death along with that of Abou Zeid on June 16, 2013. They did not specify when or where he died, only that they died in northern Mali.

Abderrahmane Talha, also a Mauritanian, succeeded Chinguetti as leader of Katiba Al Furqan that September.
