= Mamma Haidara Commemorative Library =

Private manuscript library in Timbuktu, Mali

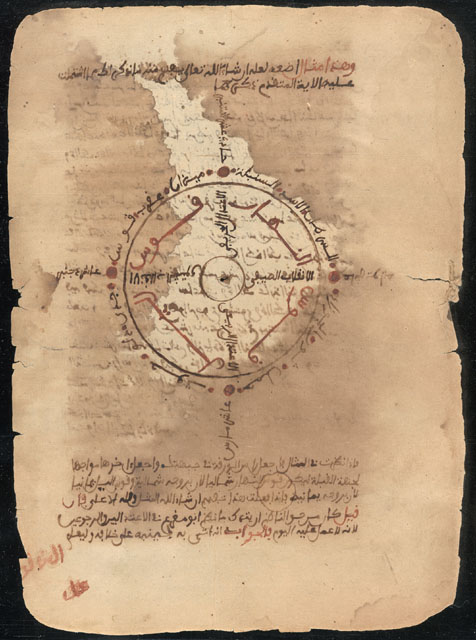
Manuscript of Nasir al-Din Abu al-Abbas Ahmad ibn al-Hajj al-Amin al-Tawathi al-Ghalawi's Kashf al-Ghummah fi Nafa al-Ummah, written in 1733 AD. From the Mamma Haidara Commemorative Library, Timbuktu.

The Mamma Haidara Commemorative Library is a private manuscript library in Timbuktu, Mali. Founded by Abdel Kader Haidara in 2000 and named in honor of his father, the library preserves one of the oldest and largest private manuscript collections in Timbuktu, with about 22,000 items.

== History ==
The library houses a collection founded in the 16th century by Mohamed El Mawlud. After the sack of Timbuktu by Moroccan soldiers in 1591, El Mawlud's descendants in the Haidara family kept their manuscripts in relative safety within the family home, as did other scholarly households in Timbuktu.

During the 20th century, Mamma Haidara collected other Malian manuscripts and bought manuscripts in Egypt and Sudan. He had also helped collect over 2,500 historic manuscripts for the Ahmed Baba Institute before his death. A judge, scholar, and teacher, Mamma Haidara amassed a large and historic personal collection of books and manuscripts over his lifetime. By his death in 1981, he had built cooperative relationships with other manuscript libraries to promote the research, conservation, and exchange of manuscripts throughout Mali.

=== Abdel Kader Haidara ===
After his father's death in 1981, Abdel Kader Haidara was left his personal library. In 1984, Haidara was invited by the head of the Ahmed Baba Institute to continue his father's work and head the acquisition efforts of manuscripts for the library's collection. Haidara agreed, and spent 12 years collecting manuscripts across the country from families and individuals. These manuscripts, known as the Timbuktu Manuscripts, date from the 12th to early 20th centuries, and cover a wide range of subjects including history, philosophy and religion, science, medicine, and poetry, written in various languages. Haidara began cataloging the library with support from the al-Furqan Heritage Foundation in London. Haidara left the Ahmed Baba Institute in 1991 to focus on his personal collection. In 1996, Haidara established a foundation for other families with large collections of Timbuktu Manuscripts called Savama-DCI, which received a grant from the Ford Foundation in Nigeria to build two new libraries in Mali, the Al-Wangari Library and the al-Imam Essayouti Library, and to hire professional archivists and conservators to preserve the texts. Haidara became well known for this work, hosting Henry Louis Gates and other prominent visitors, who helped Haidara secure a grant from the Andrew Mellon Foundation to open the Mamma Haidara Library in 2000.

Haidara first tried to digitize the collection in 2003, with help from the University of Cape Town. Beginning in 2008, some manuscripts from the library were digitized with the aid of funds from the Ford Foundation. Haidara traveled to New York in 2009, where manuscripts from his library were exhibited at the Metropolitan Museum of Art.

In 2010, the Library of Congress in Washington, D.C., included manuscripts from the Mamma Haidara Commemorative Library in a web exhibit, "Ancient Manuscripts from the Desert Libraries of Timbuktu."

=== Temporary relocation ===
In 2012, as Al-Qaeda allied militants threatened to occupy Timbuktu, Abdel Kader Haidara moved between 350,000 and 700,000 of the library's manuscripts to Bamako for safekeeping. The manuscripts were feared to be a target by militants because they were viewed as haram according to a very strict interpretation of Islamic belief, and held tremendous value for looters. Haidara and his team packed the works of astronomy, poetry, history, and jurisprudence into metal chests which were then transported from the library using mule carts and small vehicles to safe-houses throughout the city, eventually making the 500 mile journey to Bamako. A boat full of manuscripts being relocated was seized and held for ransom on the Niger River in one instance, and in others, jihadists and Malian soldiers searched the cases, damaging some of the fragile documents. In addition to militant threats, the manuscripts faced a danger in the climate of Bamako, which is much more humid than Timbuktu, and poses a risk to the condition and preservation of the texts. In total, only 4,000 of the manuscripts in the library were destroyed.

=== Re-establishment ===
In 2014, Haidara began working with Google to digitize many more of the texts. As of 2021, more than 40,000 pages had been digitized. They were also made available online.

As of 2016, the manuscripts Haidara and his team saved from the Mamma Haidara Library were still being held in safe-houses and storage lockers throughout Bamako.

In 2017, manuscripts from the library were made available for an exhibit at the International Museum of Muslim Cultures.

In 2018, manuscripts from the library were made available for an exhibit at the National Museum of India.

In February 2020, manuscripts from the library were made available for an exhibit at the Metropolitan Museum of Art.

In 2024, an agreement was made between the library and IQOU Theological College in Virginia. Seventeen manuscripts were made available for Islamic studies courses at the school. The manuscripts were granted to the school on a two-year lease.

== See also ==
- Timbuktu Manuscripts
