= Talha al-Libi =

Mauritanian jihadist

- Born: Abderrahmane Talha; 1972 or 1980s Zouerat, Mauritania
- Military career
- Allegiance: GSPC (2006-2007); AQIM (2007-present); JNIM (2017-present)
- Branch: Katiba Tarik ibn Zayed (2006-2012); Katiba al-Furqan (2013-2020)
- Rank: Emir of Katiba al-Furqan (2013-2020); Emir of Timbuktu (2020-present)
- Conflicts: Insurgency in the Sahel; Tuareg rebellion (2007-2009): Tourine ambush; Mali War: Fall of Timbuktu (2012); Takoumbaout ambush

Abderrahmane Talha, also known as Abou Talha al-Mauritani or Talha al-Libi, is a Mauritanian jihadist who is the wali of Jama'at Nasr al-Islam wal Muslimin's territory in Tombouctou Region.

== Biography ==
Talha was born in 1972 or the 1980s in Zouérat, Mauritania, to a Mauritanian father and Malian mother originally from Timbuktu. His family fled to Libya during the Tuareg rebellion of the 1990s, where Talha grew up. In 2006, Talha joined the Algerian terrorist group Salafist Group for Preaching and Combat (GSPC), which became Al-Qaeda in the Islamic Maghreb shortly afterward. He was one of the first Mauritanians in the group. He fought under the orders of Abou Zeid, the leader of AQIM, within the Katiba Tarik Ibn Zayed. He participated in the Tourine ambush in 2008 against Mauritanian forces. When interviewed by Al Jazeera in 2012, he claimed to have traveled to Niger, Nigeria, Burkina Faso, and Algeria.

During the fall of Timbuktu, Talha was active as the head of the Islamic Police of Timbuktu between April 2012 and January 2013 when the city was under jihadist control. Following the death of Abdallah al-Chinguetti in February 2013, Talha succeeded him as emir of Katiba al-Furqan. As emir of Katiba al-Furqan, Talha sought closer ties between Malian Arabs and Tuareg clans, in particular the Awlad Ich and Awlad Idriss tribes in the Tombouctou Region.

In a 2015 video, Talha asked Awlad Ich members to join AQIM in the region, and called for rebellion against French forces. Talha also appeared in a January 2016 video where he called for a return to Sharia law in northern Mali. He succeeded Abu Yahya al-Jazairi as head of JNIM in Tombouctou Region when Jazairi was killed in a clash with Malian forces in 2020. He is considered to be one of the most senior figures within Jama'at Nasr al-Islam wal Muslimin and Al-Qaeda in the Islamic Maghreb.
