= History of Timbuktu =

History of a city in the Republic of Mali

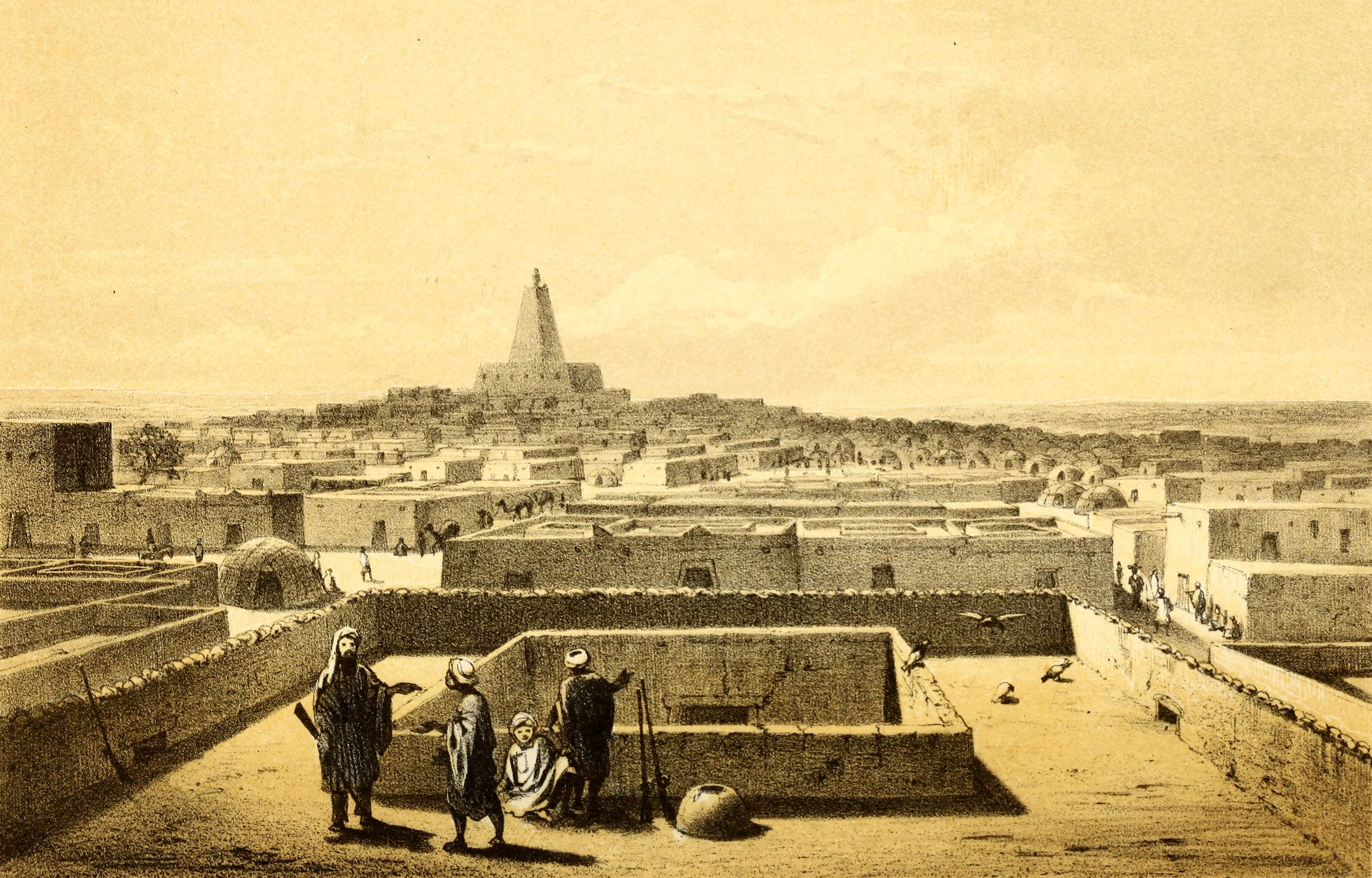
View of Timbuktu, Heinrich Barth (1858)

Starting out as a seasonal Tuareg or Berber settlement in the late 11th or early 12th century AD, Timbuktu became a permanent settlement either in the 13th or early 14th century. After a shift in trading routes in the later 14th century, the town flourished from the trade in salt, gold, ivory and slaves from several towns and states such as Begho of Bonoman, Sijilmassa, and other Saharan cities. It became part of the Mali Empire early in the 14th century when it was annexed by Mansa Musa. When Ibn Battuta visited Timbuktu in 1353 he noted that most of the inhabitants were Massufa Berbers, despite the town being under Malian rule. In the first half of the 15th century the Tuareg tribes took control of the city for a short period until the expanding Songhai Empire absorbed the city in 1468. The Moroccan army defeated the Songhai in 1591, and made Timbuktu, rather than Gao, their capital.

The invaders established a new ruling class, the Arma, who after 1612 became virtually independent of Morocco. However, the golden age of the city was over, in which it was a major learning and cultural center in the Songhai empire, and it entered a long period of decline. Different tribes governed until the French took over in 1893, a situation that lasted until it became part of the current Republic of Mali in 1960. Presently, Timbuktu is impoverished and suffers from desertification.

In its Golden Age in the 16th century, the town's numerous Islamic scholars and extensive trading network made possible an important book trade. This established Timbuktu as a renowned scholarly centre, with cultural hubs that included Sankoré Madrasa. The Andalusi author Leo Africanus visited Timbuktu in this period (in 1512) and gave a description of the town. Over two and half centuries later (in 1780) another notable account was given by the Moroccan author Shabeni, who described Timbuktu at a very different point in its history. These stories fueled speculation in Europe, where the city's reputation shifted from being extremely rich to being mysterious. This reputation overshadows the town itself in modern times, to the point where it is best known in Western culture as an expression for a distant or outlandish place.

== Prehistory ==
Chronology of Timbuktu
← / Visit by Ibn Battuta; ← / Visit by Leo Africanus; ← / Tarikh al-Sudan completed; ← / Tuareg temporarily occupy town; ← / Visit by René Caillié; ← / Toucouleur Empire; ← / Battle of Tondibi; ← / Mali Federation; ← / Azawad

Like other important Medieval West African towns such as Djenné (Jenné-Jeno), Gao, and Dia, Iron Age settlements have been discovered near Timbuktu that predate the traditional foundation date of the town. Although the accumulation of thick layers of sand has thwarted archaeological excavations in the town itself, some of the surrounding landscape is deflating and exposing pottery shards on the surface. A survey of the area by Susan and Roderick McIntosh in 1984 identified several Iron Age sites along the el-Ahmar, an ancient wadi system that passes a few kilometers to the east of the modern town.

An Iron Age tell complex located 9 kilometres (6 miles) southeast of Timbuktu near the Wadi el-Ahmar was excavated between 2008 and 2010 by archaeologists from Yale University and the Mission Culturelle de Tombouctou. The results suggest that the site was first occupied in the 5th century BC, thrived throughout the second half of the 1st millennium AD and eventually collapsed sometime in the late 10th or early 11th century AD.

== Roman exploration ==
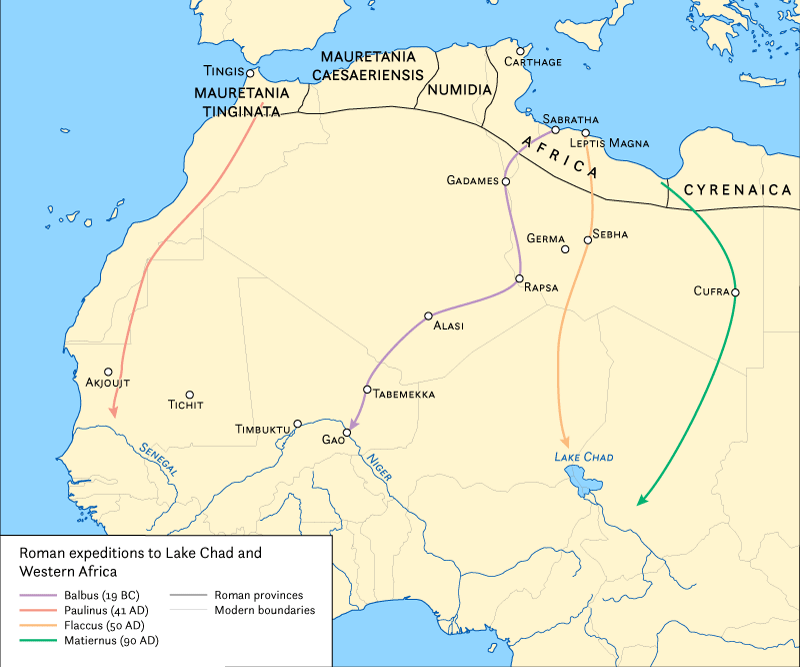
Roman expeditions into the African continent

The Roman historian Gaius Plinius Secundus wrote that there were two expeditions into the Sahara Desert conducted by the Roman Army that reached modern-day Timbuktu. The first was carried out in 19 BC by the politician Lucius Cornelius Balbus, along with a small group of legionaries, and another repeated in 70 AD by the commander of Legio III Augusta, named Festus. However, this second expedition has been disputed.

Deposits of Roman coins have been found in the region surrounding Timbuktu, although these could have been transported indirectly by trade.

== Early sources ==
Unlike Gao, Timbuktu is not mentioned by the early Arab geographers such as al-Bakri and al-Idrisi. The first mention is by the Moroccan traveler Ibn Battuta who visited both Timbuktu and Kabara in 1353 when returning from a stay in the capital of the Mali Empire. Timbuktu was still relatively unimportant and Battuta quickly moved on to Gao. At the time both Timbuktu and Gao formed part of the Mali Empire. A century and a half later, in 1512, Leo Africanus visited Timbuktu. He gave a description of the town in his Descrittione dell'Africa which was published in 1550. The original Italian was translated into a number of other languages and the book became widely known in Europe.

The earliest surviving local documents are the 17th century chronicles, al-Sadi's Tarikh al-Sudan and Ibn al-Mukhtar's Tarikh al-fattash. These provide information on the town at the time of the Songhai Empire and the invasion by Moroccan forces in 1591. The authors do not, in general, acknowledge their sources but the accounts are likely to be based on oral tradition and on earlier written records that have not survived. Al-Sadi and Ibn al-Mukhtar were members of the scholarly class and their chronicles reflect the interests of this group. The chronicles provide biographies of the imams and judges but contain relatively little information on the social and economic history of the town.

The Tarikh al-fattash ends in around 1600 while the Tarikh al-Sudan continues to 1655. Information after this date is provided by the Tadhkirat al-Nisyan (A Reminder to the Obvious), an anonymous biographical dictionary of the Moroccan rulers of Timbuktu written in around 1750. It does not contain the detail provided by the earlier Tarikh al-Sudan. A short chronicle written by Mawlay al-Qasim gives details of the pashalik in the second half of the 18th century. For the 19th century there are numerous local sources but the information is very fragmented.

== Origins ==
When Abd al-Sadi wrote his chronicle Tarikh al-Sudan, based on oral tradition, in the 17th century, he dated the foundation of Timbuktut as a seasonal camp to 'the end of the fifth century of the hijra' or around 1100 AD. Al-Sadi saw Maghsharan Tuareg as the founders, as their summer encampment grew from temporary settlement to depot to travellers' meeting place, becoming a permanent town either in the 13th or early 14th century. Modern scholars believe that there is insufficient evidence to pinpoint the exact time of origin and founders of Timbuktu, although it is archeologically clear that the city originated from a local trade mainly between the Middle Niger Delta, on the one hand, and between the pastoralists of the Sahara. The importance of the river prompted descriptions of the city as 'a gift of the Niger', in analogy to Herodotus's description of Egypt as 'gift of the Nile'.

Monroe asserts, based on archaeological evidence, that Timbuktu emerged from an urban-rural dynamic, that is, aiming to provide services to its immediate rural hinterland. By the mid-1st millennium AD, the area around Timbuktu was already involved in an interregional exchange network with early towns such as Djenné-Djenno and Dia as well as the Méma region.

== 14th century: the Mali Empire ==
Timbuktu was peacefully annexed by Mansa Musa I when returning from his pilgrimage in 1324 to Mecca. The city became part of the Mali Empire and Musa I ordered the construction of a royal palace. Both the Tarikh al-Sudan and the Tarikh al-fattash attribute the building of the Djinguereber Mosque to Musa I. Two centuries later in 1570 Qadi al-Aqib had the mosque pulled down and rebuilt on a larger scale.

In 1353 Ibn Battuta visited Timbuktu and met the governor, Farba Musa. He also mentioned the grave of the Andalusi poet and architect Al Sahili, who is credited with constructing buildings for Mansa Musa.

Timbuktu developed as a commercial and religious centre in the 14th century as Walata, the previous hub of trans-Saharan trade in the region, began to decline in importance. According to the Tarikh al-Sudan, Islamic scholars and 'holy men' from Walata, who were originally from as far as Egypt, Libya, Algeria and Morocco, gradually settled in Timbuktu. Islam at the time in the area was not uniform, its nature changing from city to city, and Timbuktu's bond with the religion was reinforced through its openness to strangers that attracted religious scholars.

In 1375, Timbuktu appeared in the Catalan Atlas, showing that it was, by then, a commercial centre linked to the North-African cities and had caught Europe's attention.

== 15th-16th century: Tuareg rule and the Songhai Empire ==
With the power of the Mali Empire waning in the first half of the 15th century, Timbuktu became relatively autonomous, although Maghsharan Tuareg had a dominating position. In this period it was led by the Tuareg Akil Akamalwa.

Thirty years later the rising Songhai Empire expanded, absorbing Timbuktu in 1468 or 1469. The city was led, consecutively, by Sunni Ali Ber (1468–1492), Sunni Baru (1492–1493) and Askia Mohammad I (1493–1528). Although Sunni Ali Ber was in severe conflict with Timbuktu after its conquest, Askia Mohammad I created a golden age for both the Songhai Empire and Timbuktu through an efficient central and regional administration and allowed sufficient leeway for the city's commercial centers to flourish.

With Gao the capital of the Songhai Empire, Timbuktu enjoyed a relatively autonomous position. Merchants from Ghadames, Awjilah, and numerous other cities of North Africa gathered there to buy gold and slaves in exchange for the Saharan salt of Taghaza and for North African cloth and horses. Leadership of the Empire stayed in the Askia dynasty until 1591, when internal fights weakened the dynasty's grip and led to a decline of prosperity in the city.

== 1591: Moroccan conquest ==
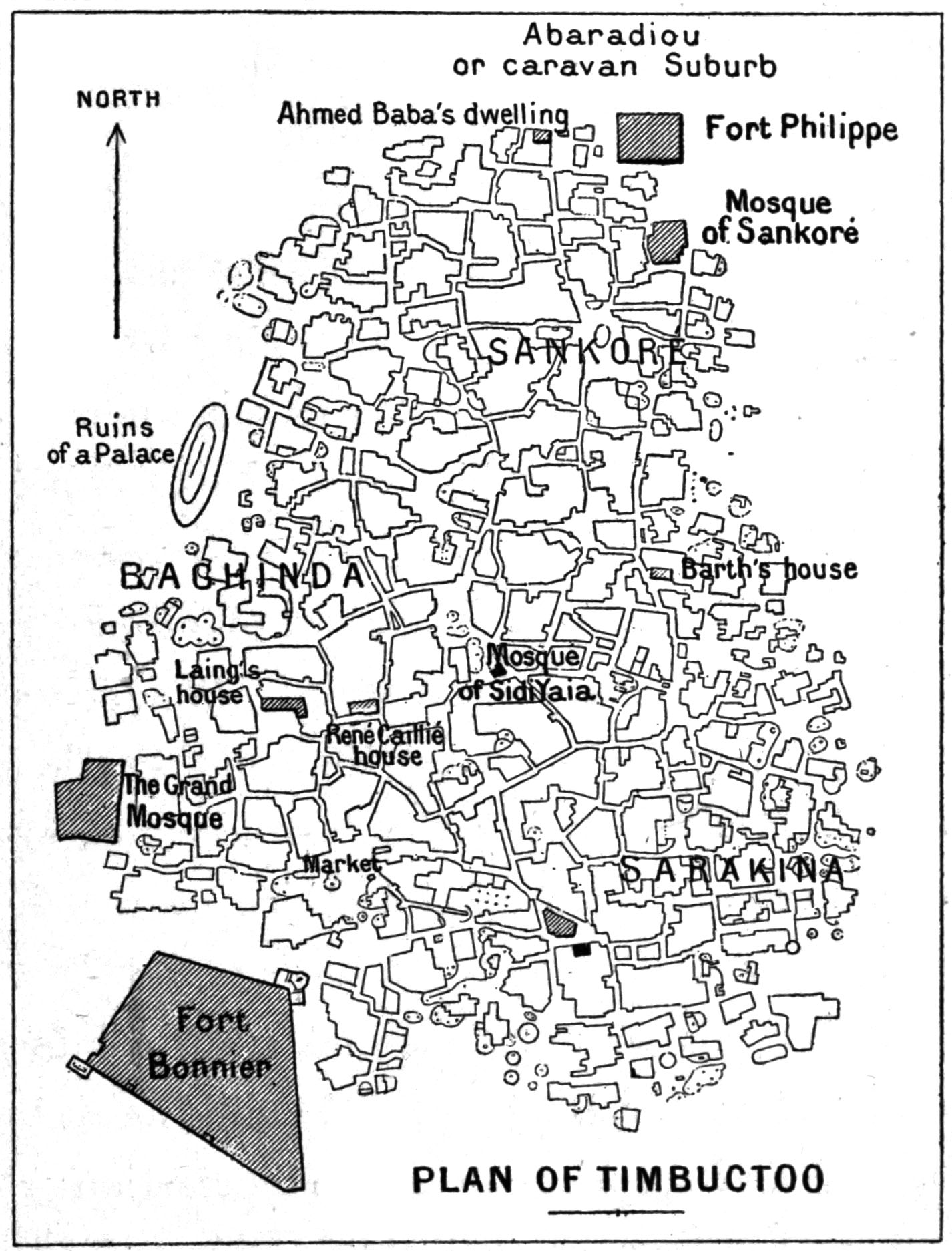
Plan published by Félix Dubois in 1896

Following the Battle of Tondibi, the city was captured on 30 May 1591 by an expedition of mercenaries, dubbed the Arma. They were sent by the Saadi ruler of Morocco, Ahmad I al-Mansur, and were led by the Spanish Muslim Judar Pasha in search of gold mines. The Arma brought the end of an era of relative autonomy. (see: Pashalik of Timbuktu) The following period brought economic and intellectual decline.

In 1593, Ahmad I al-Mansur cited 'disloyalty' as the reason for arresting, and subsequently killing or exiling, many of Timbuktu's scholars, including Ahmad Baba. Perhaps the city's greatest scholar, he was forced to move to Marrakesh because of his intellectual opposition to the Pasha, where he continued to attract the attention of the scholarly world. Ahmad Baba later returned to Timbuktu, where he died in 1627.

The city's decline continued, with the increasing trans-atlantic trade routes – transporting African slaves, including leaders and scholars of Timbuktu – marginalising Timbuktu's role as a trade and scholarly center. While initially controlling the Morocco – Timbuktu trade routes, Morocco soon cut its ties with the Arma and the grip of the numerous subsequent pashas on the city began losing its strength: Tuareg temporarily took over control in 1737 and the remainder of the 18th century saw various Tuareg tribes, Bambara and Kounta briefly occupy or besiege the city. In this period, the influence of the Pashas, who by then had mixed with the Songhay through intermarriage, never completely disappeared.

This changed in 1826, when the Massina Empire took over control of the city until 1865, when they were driven away by the Toucouleur Empire. Sources conflict on who was in control when the French arrived: Elias N. Saad in 1983 suggests the Soninke Wangara, a 1924 article in the Journal of the Royal African Society mentions the Tuareg, while Africanist John Hunwick does not determine one ruler, but notes several states competing for power 'in a shadowy way' until 1893.

== 19th century: European explorers ==
Historic descriptions of the city had been around since Leo Africanus's account in the first half of the 16th century, and they prompted several European individuals and organizations to make great efforts to discover Timbuktu and its fabled riches. In 1788 a group of titled Englishmen formed the African Association with the goal of finding the city and charting the course of the Niger River. The earliest of their sponsored explorers was a young Scottish adventurer named Mungo Park, who made two trips in search of the Niger River and Timbuktu (departing first in 1795 and then in 1805). It is believed that Park was the first Westerner to have reached the city, but he died in modern-day Nigeria without having the chance to report his findings.

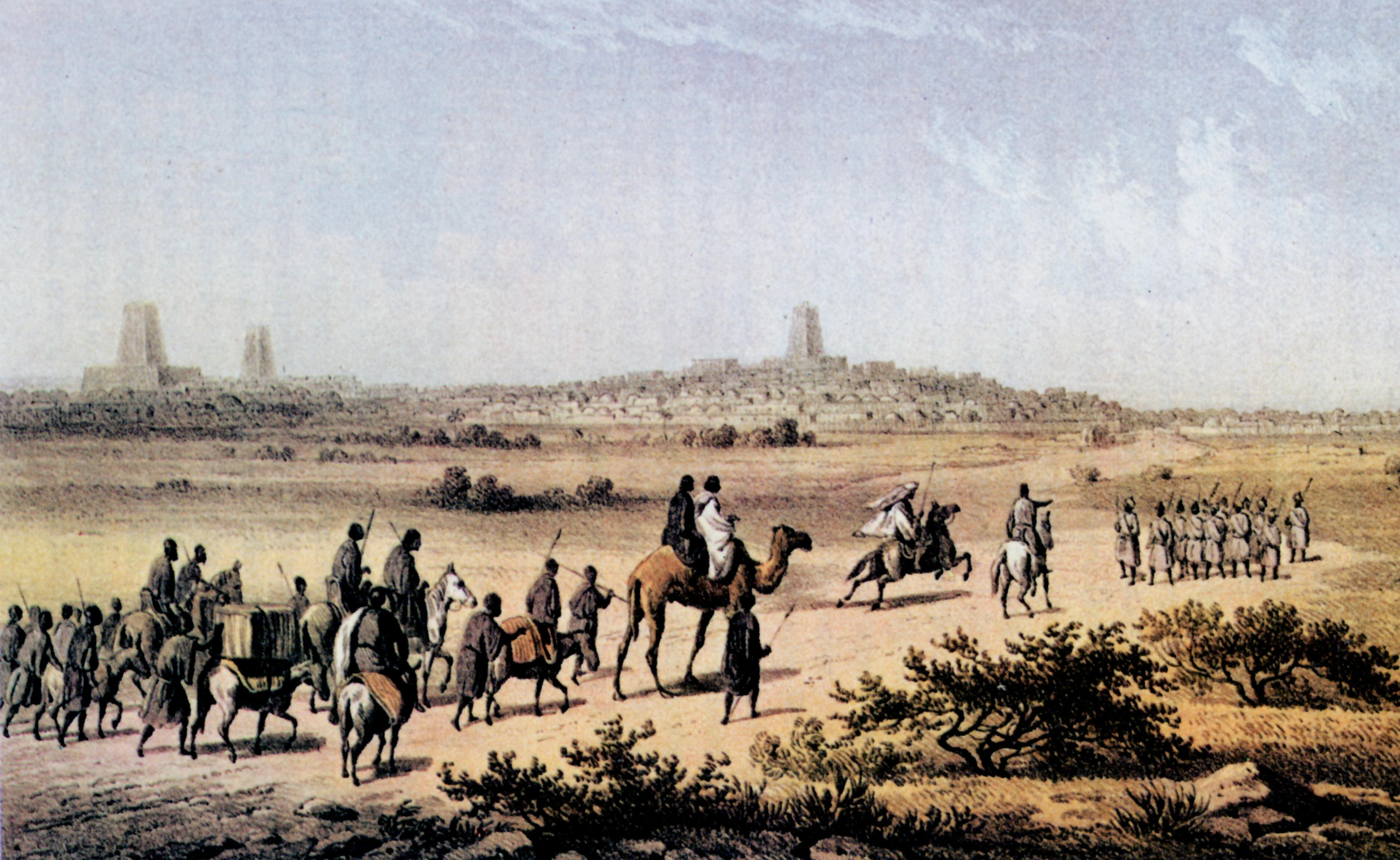
Heinrich Barth approaching Timbuktu on 7 September 1853

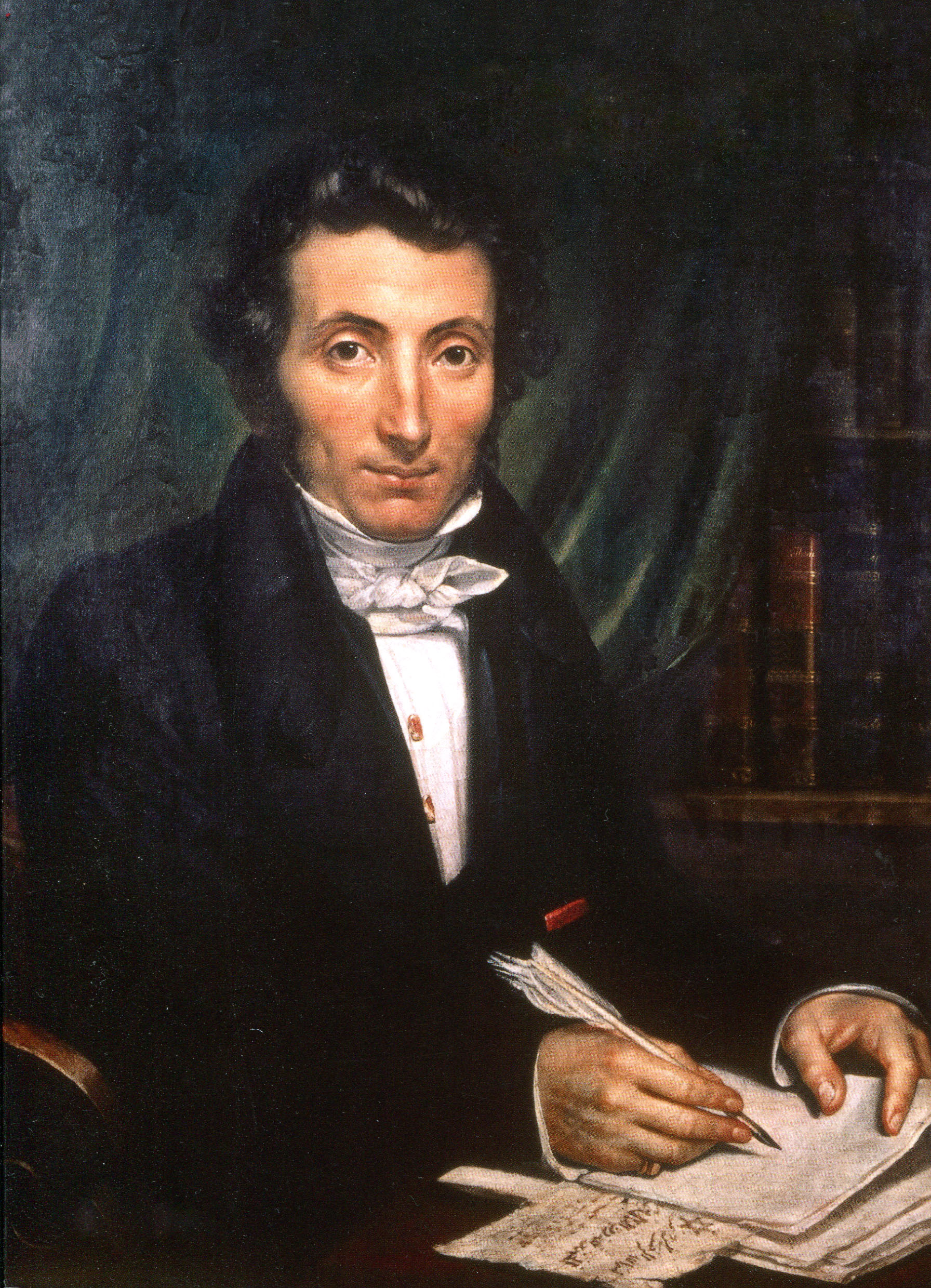
Disguised as a Muslim, René Caillié was one of the first non-Muslims to enter the city of Timbuktu.

In 1824, the Paris-based Société de Géographie offered a 9,000 franc prize to the first non-Muslim to reach the town and return with information about it. The Scotsman Gordon Laing arrived in August 1826 but was killed the following month by local Muslims who were fearful of European intervention. The Frenchman René Caillié arrived in 1828 travelling alone, disguised as a Muslim; he was able to safely return and claim the prize.

The American sailor Robert Adams claimed to have visited Timbuktu in 1812, while he was enslaved for several years in Northern Africa. After being freed by the British consul in Tangier and going to Europe, he gave an account of his experience, potentially making him the first Westerner for hundreds of years to have reached the city and returned to tell about it. However, his story quickly became controversial. While some historians have defended Adams' account, more recent scholarship concludes that while Adams was almost certainly in Northern Africa, the discrepancies in his depiction of Timbuktu make it unlikely he ever visited the city. Three other Europeans reached the city before 1890: Heinrich Barth in 1853 and the German Oskar Lenz with the Spaniard Cristobal Benítez in 1880.

== 1893: French colonial rule ==
After the scramble for Africa had been formalized in the Berlin Conference, land between the 14th meridian west and Miltou, South-West Chad, became French territory, bounded in the south by a line running from Say, Niger to Baroua. Although the Timbuktu region was now French in name, the principle of effective occupation required France to actually hold power in those areas assigned, e.g. by signing agreements with local chiefs, setting up a government and making use of the area economically, before the claim would be definitive. On 15 December 1893, the city, by then long past its prime, was annexed by a small group of French soldiers, led by Lieutenant Gaston Boiteux.

Timbuktu became part of French Sudan (Soudan Français), a colony of France. The colony was reorganised and the name changed several times in the French colonial period. In 1899 the French Sudan was subdivided and Timbuktu became part of Upper Senegal and Middle Niger (Haut-Sénégal et Moyen Niger). In 1902 the name became Senegambia and Niger (Sénégambie et Niger) and in 1904 this was changed again to Upper Senegal and Niger (Haut-Sénégal et Niger). This name was used until 1920 when it became French Sudan again.

== 1939–1945: World War II ==
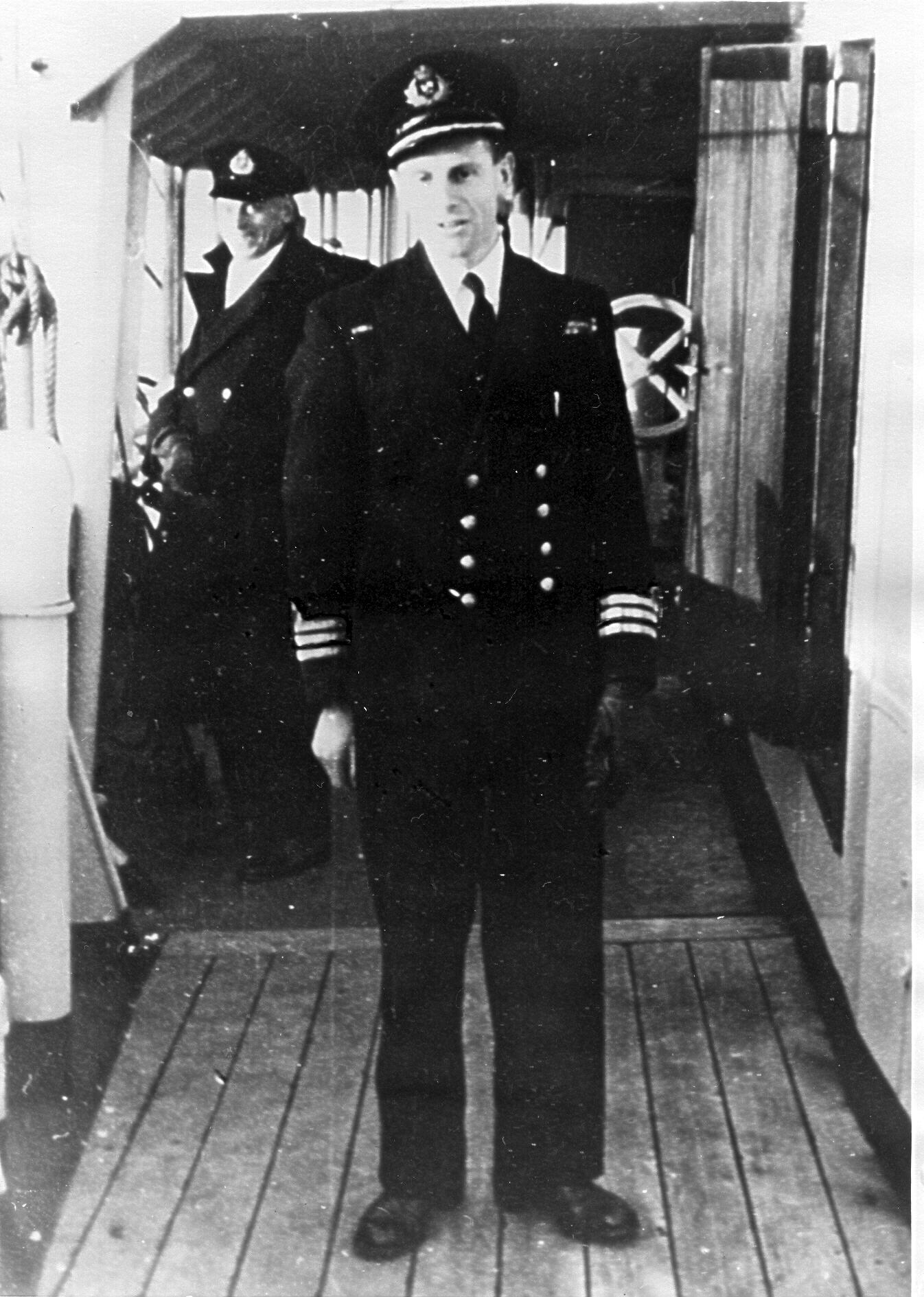
Peter de Neumann, alias The Man from Timbuctoo, as commander of HMRC Vigilant, about 1950

In World War II several legions were recruited in French Soudan, including recruits from Timbuktu, to serve in the Free French armed forces.

In October 1941 the Vichy French authorities transferred a group of interned British Merchant Navy seafarers from Conakry to Timbuktu. The men had been a scratch crew taking a captured French cargo ship, SS Criton, from Freetown to try to reach Britain. Two Vichy French warships intercepted Criton, and one sank her by shellfire after her Master refused to surrender. The French moved 52 members of Criton's crew to Timbuktu. Several, including her Second Officer, Peter de Neumann, escaped, but all were recaptured. In August 1942 the French moved Criton's crew to Kankan. After his return to England, de Neumann became known as "The Man from Timbuctoo".

In March 1942 U-68 sank a Welsh cargo steamship, SS Allende, off the coast of Liberia. 38 survivors reached land at Tabou, Ivory Coast. The Vichy French authorities interned them at Bobo-Dioulasso and Bamako. By May 1942 the French had transferred at least some of the crew to Timbuktu, where two of them died of disease: an able seaman on 2 May and the Chief Engineer on 28 May. Both men have Commonwealth War Graves in Timbuktu's European cemetery.

== 1960: independence ==
After World War II, the French government under Charles de Gaulle granted the colony more and more freedom. After a period as part of the short-lived Mali Federation, the Republic of Mali was proclaimed on 22 September 1960. After 19 November 1968, a new constitution was created in 1974, making Mali a single-party state.

By then, the canal linking the city with the Niger River had already been filled with sand from the encroaching desert. Severe droughts hit the Sahel region in 1973 and 1985, decimating the Tuareg population around Timbuktu who relied on goat herding. The Niger's water level dropped, postponing the arrival of food transport and trading vessels. The crisis drove many of the inhabitants of Tombouctou Region to Algeria and Libya. Those who stayed relied on humanitarian organizations such as UNICEF for food and water.

== 2012: Malian civil war ==
Following increasing frustration within the armed forces over the Malian government's ineffective strategies to suppress a Tuareg rebellion in northern Mali, a military coup on 21 March 2012 overthrew President Amadou Toumani Touré and overturned the 1992 constitution. The Tuareg rebels of the MNLA and Ansar Dine took advantage of the confusion to make swift gains, and on 1 April 2012, Timbuktu was captured from the Malian military.

On 3 April 2012, the BBC News reported that the Islamist rebel group Ansar Dine had started implementing its version of sharia in Timbuktu. That day, ag Ghaly gave a radio interview in Timbuktu announcing that Sharia law would be enforced in the city, including the veiling of women, the stoning of adulterers, and the punitive mutilation of thieves. According to Timbuktu's mayor, the announcement caused nearly all of Timbuktu's Christian population to flee the city.

The MNLA declared the independence of Azawad, containing Timbuktu, from Mali on 6 April 2012, but was rapidly pushed aside by Islamist movements Ansar Dine and AQMI who installed sharia in the city and destroyed some of the burial chambers. In early June, a group of residents stated they had formed an armed militia to fight against the rebel occupation of the city. One member, a former army officer, stated that the proclaimer 'Patriots' Resistance Movement for the Liberation of Timbuktu' opposed the secession of northern Mali.

On 28 January 2013, French and Malian soldiers reclaimed Timbuktu with little or no resistance and reinstalled Malian governmental authorities. Five days later, French President François Hollande accompanied by his Malian counterpart Dioncounda Traoré visited the city before heading to Bamako and were welcomed by an ecstatic population.

The city has been attacked multiple times on several different occasions. On 21 March 2013 a suicide bomber detonated his explosives, killing a Malian soldier, creating a fierce shoot-out at the international airport which resulted in the killing of ten rebels. On 31 March 2013, a group of 20 rebels infiltrated into Timbuktu as civilians and attacked the Malian army base in the city, killing three Malian soldiers and injuring dozens more.

== Recent issues ==
Despite its illustrious history, as of 2009 Timbuktu was an impoverished town, poor even by Third World standards. The population grew an average 5.7% per year from 29,732 in 1998 to 54,453 in 2009. As capital of the seventh Malian region, Tombouctou Region, Timbuktu is the seat of the regional governor. Colonel Mamadou Mangara took over from Colonel Mamadou Togola in 2008.

The city has had to deal with both droughts and floods, the latter caused by an insufficient drainage system that fails to transport direct rainwater from the city centre. One such event damaged a World Heritage property, killing two and injuring one in 2002. Shifting of rain patterns due to climate change, and increased use of water for irrigation in the surrounding areas has led to water scarcity for agriculture and personal use.

== See also ==
- Timbuktu Renaissance, an initiative to rebuild the city's economy through music and culture
