= Battle of Bamba =

2020 terrorist attack

- Part of Mali War
Date	April 6, 2020
Location	Bamba, Mali
Result	JNIM victory

Belligerents
Mali	Jama'at Nasr al-Islam wal Muslimin

Commanders and leaders
Unknown	Abu Yahya al-Jazairi †

Casualties and losses
Malian claim: 25 killed, 6 wounded JNIM claim: 30 killed or wounded	Malian claim: ~12

On April 6, 2020, jihadist militants from the al-Qaeda linked Jama'at Nasr al-Islam wal Muslimin (JNIM) attacked a secluded Malian military base in Bamba, killing dozens of Malian soldiers. A raid in retribution the following day killed JNIM leader Abu Yahya al-Jizari.

== Battle ==
Prior to the battle, residents of Bamba stated JNIM militants were riding around the town on motorbikes, and setting up positions in preparation for the attack. The attack was launched at 5:15am on April 6, with the fighters attacking an old inn that Malian troops were using as a military base. After destroying and seizing equipment from the base, the jihadists retreated. The attack was claimed four days later, on April 10, by JNIM.

== Casualties and aftermath ==
On the day of the attack, local elected officials stated that at least twenty Malian soldiers were killed in the attack. Both civilians and the elected officials stated that JNIM only targeted the Malian base, and no civilians were harmed. In the following days, after Malian operations to recover bodies and the captured weaponry, it was assessed that 25 Malian troops were killed and six wounded, with around a dozen JNIM fighters sustaining casualties during the battle. JNIM claimed in its statement admitting its involvement in the attack that around 30 Malian troops were killed.

In late April, it was reported that Abu Yahya al-Jizari, the leader of JNIM and commander in the battle at Bamba, succumbed to injuries sustained during combat in Bamba. He was later replaced by Talha al-Libi.
