= Battle of Timetrine =

- Part of Northern Mali conflict
Date	24 February 2013
Location	Timetrine, Tessalit Cercle, Mali
Result	French victory

Belligerents
France	Al-Qaeda in the Islamic Maghreb

Commanders and leaders
	Mohamed Lemine Ould El-Hassen †

Casualties and losses
None	~15 killed

The Battle of Timetrine was a battle between French forces and al-Qaeda in the Islamic Maghreb (AQIM) militants in Timetrine, in Tessalit.

== Background ==
On February 22, 2013, the Directorate-General for External Security (DGSE) caught and intercepted some jihadist telephone calls that hinted that one of the French hostages captured by AQIM managed to escape his captors in the Timetrine, a desert and mountainous region, located west of the valley of Tilemsi which separates it of the Adrar of the Ifoghas. On the night of February 22–23, the French Special Forces launched Operation Avrid from Tessalit with naval commandos, and a group of the Air Parachute Commando No. 10 (CPA-10), but the first night searches were unsuccessful. The next night, a Tiger helicopter spotted a group of a dozen jihadists within two pickups. The Tiger opened fire but its machine gun jammed and it and the helicopter retreated. Around 5 a.m, the Islamists abandoned their camp, but they continued to be monitored by a drone, but video transmission was temporarily interrupted because of a power failure in Niamey.

== The battle ==
Finally, one of the vehicles was again located at a stop later in the night. At dawn, the French forces deployed two Puma helicopters which deposited about thirty soldiers of the 1st Marine Infantry Parachute Regiment. The soldiers were dropped about 2–5 miles from the jihadists. The French then moved towards the AQIM camp supported by a Tiger helicopter, an Atlantic-2 aircraft, and an Harfang drone. But AQIM fighters covered in blankets spotted the French and opened fire on them, without inflicting any damage due to poor sight caused by darkness. The French, equipped with night vision, were able to accurately return fire. Subsequently, two and a half kilometers further north, the second group of jihadists also engages in the combat. In total, about fifteen Islamists took part in the confrontation. For its part, the Tiger opened fire and killed several AQIM. The Tiger was narrowly missed by a rocket of an RPG-7 fired by the fighters of the second group, whose fighters were in turn shot by the riposte of the Tiger. The parachutists then progressed to a rocky hill that overlooked the area and seized three vehicles abandoned by the jihadists. The latter was positioned at the foot of the rocky peak and opened fire on the French as they arrived one kilometer from them. A sniper duel began and continued for several hours. Finally, the paratroopers received reinforcements, and then launched the final assault on the mound. The last jihadists tried to throw themselves on the soldiers in a final kamikaze attack, but they were each time eliminated before being able to detonate their explosive belts. At the end of the fight, all the jihadists were killed. The French soldiers then searched the vehicles and corpses of the AQIM fighters, recognizing a commander among them, Mohamed Lemine Ould El-Hassen, one of the four brigades of AQIM. On June 16, 2013, AQIM officially confirmed the death of Mohamed Lemine Ould El-Hassen at the same time as that of Abdelhamid Abou Zeid. The statement does not specify the date, nor the place of his death, just stated that he was killed during "the last engagements with enemy forces in northern Mali ".
