= Takoumbaout ambush =

2015 Mali War conflict

- Part of Mali War
Date	July 2, 2015
Location	Takoumbaout, between Goundam and Timbuktu, Tombouctou Region, Mali
Result	AQIM victory

Belligerents
MINUSMA: Burkina Faso	Al-Qaeda in the Islamic Maghreb: Katiba al-Furqan

Commanders and leaders
Unknown	Abderrahmane Talha; Abou al-Nour al-Andalusi

Casualties and losses
6 killed 2 injured	None

On July 2, 2015, a MINUSMA convoy was ambushed by jihadists affiliated with Al-Qaeda in the Islamic Maghreb en route from Goundam to Timbuktu.

== Background ==
MINUSMA is the United Nations peacekeeping force, and shortly after it was implemented in the fallout of the Mali War, became a target of jihadist groups such as Ansar Dine and Al-Qaeda in the Islamic Maghreb (AQIM). These groups are often active in Tombouctou Region, where the ambush took place.

== Ambush ==
Prior to the attack, the AQIM fighters had a lot of intelligence regarding the MINUSMA convoy, including how many soldiers would be on it and where it would be going and at what time. At the moment the jihadists attacked with rocket launchers and guns, the convoy was going at very high speeds, causing a "very violent" situation that surprised the peacekeepers. The ambush was claimed the same day by AQIM. MINUSMA reported the deaths of six peacekeepers and five injured, who were all part of the Badenya battalions, Burkinabe units of MINUSMA. AQIM, in a press release to Mauritanian news agency al-Akhbar, claimed the deaths of seven peacekeepers and four destroyed vehicles.

== Aftermath ==
MINUSMA dispatched units to the site following the attack, but the jihadists had fled at that point. In early September, AQIM released a video of the ambush. The video contained songs and imagery used often by propaganda videos from the Islamic State of Iraq and Syria. In the video, several dozen fighters of the al-Quds unit commanded by Katiba al-Furqanemir Abderrahmane Talha. Another member of Katiba al-Furqan, a Spaniard named Abou al-Nour al-Andalusi led a group of twenty-five men in the video.
