= Peter de Neumann =

British Royal Navy officer

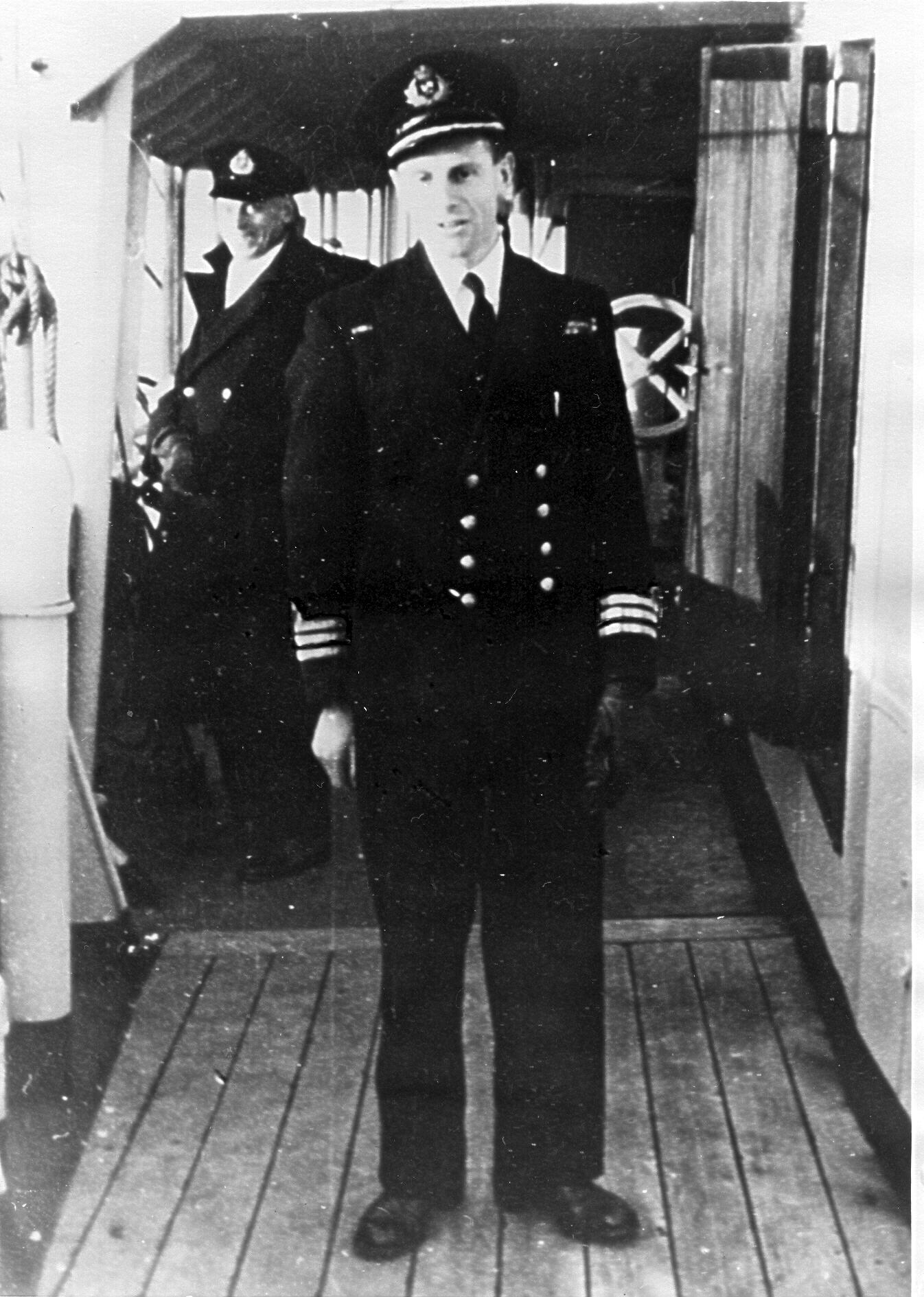
- Capt Peter de Neumann MN, HMRC Vigilant, circa 1950
- Born: Bernard Peter de Neumann; 18 September 1917; Hadleigh, Essex
- Died: 16 September 1972 (aged 54); Tilbury Dockside, Essex
- Burial place: River Thames off Gravesend, Kent
- Relatives: Bernard de Neumann (son)
- Military career
- Allegiance: England
- Branch: Merchant Navy
- Rank: Master Mariner
- Nickname: The Man from Timbuctoo
- Commands: ex-Luftwaffe Flak Ship Hilde, Empire Maymorn, Ariguani, HMRC Vigilant
- Conflicts: Atlantic, Sicily Landings, Italy Landings, Normandy Landings, Pacific
- Awards: George Medal; Lloyd's War Medal for Bravery at Sea
- Other work: Harbourmaster (Port of London, United Kingdom) Dockmaster (Tilbury, Essex)

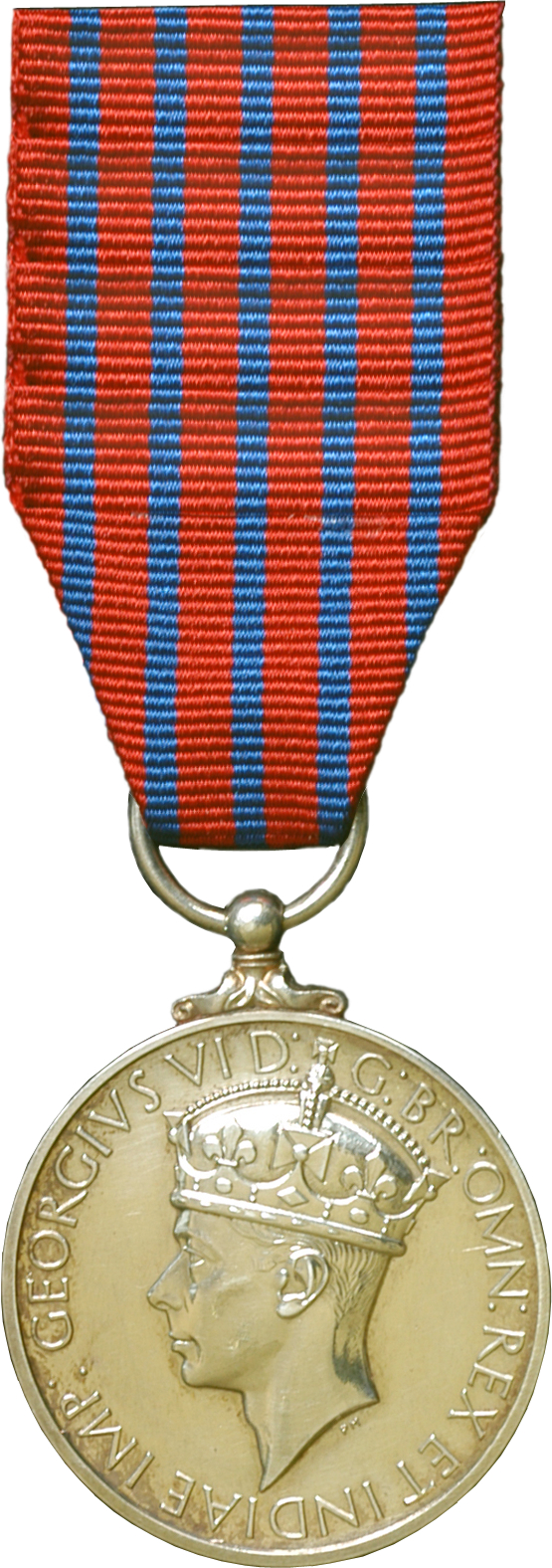
George Medal

Captain Bernard Peter de Neumann GM (18 September 1917 – 16 September 1972) was a British Merchant Navy officer. His seagoing career included being sunk twice in the space of one month, and being charged and convicted of piracy by the Vichy French, after which he was imprisoned in Timbuktu.

== World War II ==
During the Second World War, De Neumann was awarded both the George Medal and the Lloyd's War Medal for Bravery at Sea for removing a 250 kilogram bomb from deep in the engine-room of SS Tewkesbury and dropping it over his ship's side during a Luftwaffe attack off Aberdeen on 1 March 1941. SS Tewkesbury was torpedoed and sunk by gunfire from U-69 on 21 May 1941. All of the crew survived and escaped in two boats; de Neumann's lifeboat was picked up by the American freighter SS Exhibitor. He was later transferred to HMS Cilicia. (SS Tewkesbury's other lifeboat was rescued by SS Antinous after 13 days.)

HMS Cilicia arrived at Freetown on 17 June 1941, and de Neumann volunteered as Second Officer aboard the Royal Navy prize vessel SS Criton (captured from the Vichy French). SS Criton sailed from Freetown for the UK on 19 June 1941, but was intercepted by two Vichy France warships, Air France IV and Edith Germaine, on 21 June and sunk by gunfire. Criton's crew were escorted under armed guard to Conakry, where the executive officers were tried and found guilty of piracy by a Vichy French naval court-martial and imprisoned in Timbuktu. They managed to escape, and walked 640 kilometres (400 mi) up the Niger River before they were recaptured and returned to Timbuktu. De Neumann was eventually released at the end of December 1942, and arrived back in the UK aboard the armed merchant cruiser HMS Asturias in mid-January 1943.

De Neumann received the George Medal from King George VI for his bravery while aboard SS Tewkesbury in mid-February 1943.

In 1945 he captained the ex-Luftwaffe Flak Ship Hilde on a voyage to Leningrad, as part of the division of German ships amongst the Allies, returning overland by train and ferry to the UK. He then captained the Empire Maymorn on her delivery to Georgetown, British Guiana, returning to the UK as Captain of the Ariguani, which had formerly been HMS Ariguani, the very first Fighter Catapult Ship and a forerunner of the Catapult Armed Merchantmen. From 1947 to 1953, he captained HMRC Vigilant.

== Port of London Authority ==
De Neumann began developing thoughts on the potential for a port-control system while he was captain of HMRC Vigilant. These ideas followed on from considering such incidents as the accidental ramming of the submarine HMS Truculent by Divina in 1950, the Norwegian vessel Baalbek's collision with the Nore Army Fort in 1953, and the disastrous North Sea flood that resulted in the flooding of Canvey Island, Foulness and the East Coast in 1953. In these and other situations, rescue and intelligence gathering were severely hampered by a lack of centralised command and control, which led to a lack of situational awareness.

In 1953, de Neumann resigned his command of HMRC Vigilant following the Spithead Review and transferred to the Port of London Authority. He then put in place a feasibility study of a port-control system which he oversaw throughout its development and ultimate installation at Gravesend, which was completed in 1960.

He served as Harbourmaster, and, after his health deteriorated owing to his earlier imprisonment in West Africa, Dockmaster at Tilbury.

=== Commendations ===
De Neumann was commended for his handling of the rescue attempt following the sinking of the Tug Sunfish under Tower Bridge on 12 March 1960. The Sunfish was aft and the Sun VI forward of the Ellerman Lines' Palermo, dragging through Tower Bridge inward bound in the Upper Pool, when the Sunfish was dragged on the Northern Buttress of the bridge. Her stern struck, rolling her over, and she sank with the loss of her Chief Engineer. She was raised the next day, refurbished, and returned to service.

Another commendation came for his part in rescuing the crew of the Tug Kenia when she sank in the New Lock bellmouth, Tilbury Dock, on 25 August 1964. The Crested Cock and the Kenia were undocking the Maashaven from Tilbury Dock New Entrance. The ship started her swing to starboard in the Bellmouth and the Kenia was on the port bow when coming around, the Maashaven went ahead and pinned her to the upper dock head before she cleared the ship's bow. The Kenia was cut from the deck to the keel in the after end of the engine room starboard side. A line was passed to the pier head and secured, and all crew rapidly taken ashore, before she sank. Kenia was raised by the PLA Salvage Department and scrapped.

De Neumann was also commended for his attempt to save the life of a crane driver injured when his crane toppled across the open hold of a ship in Tilbury Dock on 10 March 1966. The crane driver died before he could be released.

== Death ==
A few days before his death, he was involved in another incident with a toppled crane at Tilbury. This time the driver survived. De Neumann was killed in an accident at Tilbury Docks on 16 September 1972, two days before his 55th birthday. His ashes were scattered on the River Thames in Gravesend Reach.

== Museum pieces ==
Three items which de Neumann brought home from Timbuktu were on loan to the Imperial War Museum in London and displayed in the Survival at Sea Exhibition. They were:

- A copy of the New Testament, with a diary of the movements the prisoners made whilst in captivity
- A Red Cross label from a parcel addressed to de Neumann in Timbuktu
- The tumbler he made from the bottom of a Perrier water bottle by half-filling it with water, binding paraffin-soaked twine around it at the water level, and igniting it, making the glass crack at the water-line
