= Timbuktu Manuscripts =

Manuscripts preserved in Timbuktu, Mali

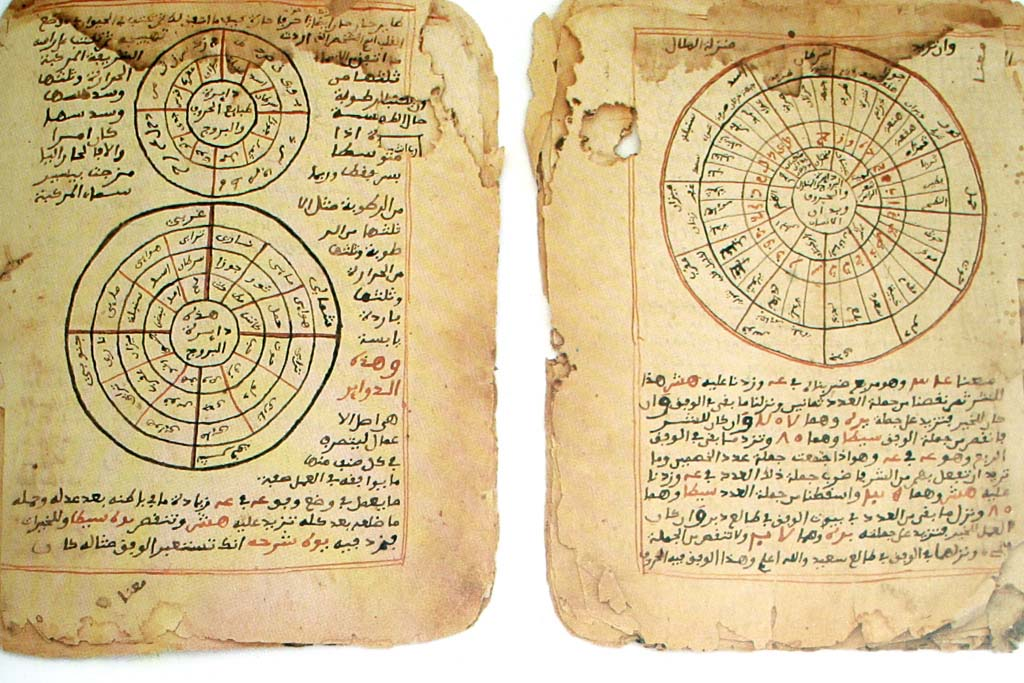
Manuscript pages from Timbuktu dating from 1731 AD

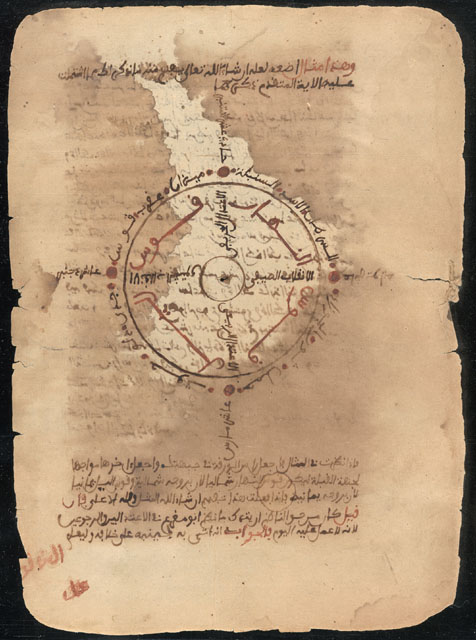
Manuscript of Nasir al-Din Abu al-Abbas Ahmad ibn al-Hajj al-Amin al-Tawathi al-Ghalawi's Kashf al-Ghummah fi Nafa al-Ummah, written in 1733 AD. From the Mamma Haidara Commemorative Library, Timbuktu.

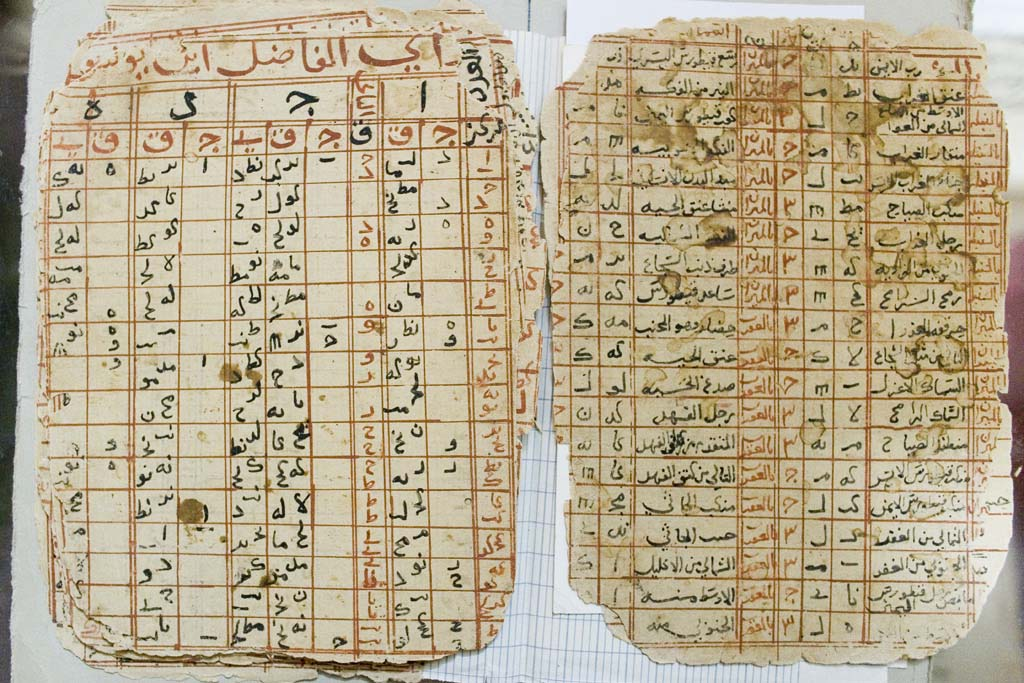
A manuscript page from Timbuktu showing a table of astronomical information. A later copy of an original manuscript authored by the Egyptian astronomer Ibn Yunus (c. 950 – 1009 AD)

Timbuktu Manuscripts, or Tombouctou Manuscripts, is a blanket term for the large number of historically significant manuscripts that have been preserved for centuries in private households in Timbuktu, a city in northern Mali. The collections include manuscripts about art, medicine, philosophy, and science, as well as copies of the Quran. Timbuktu manuscripts are the most well known set of West African manuscripts.

The manuscripts are predominantly written in Arabic in the Arabic script. Some manuscripts are written in African languages using Arabic script, which is known as Ajami; this includes, but is not limited to, Fula, Songhay, Tamasheq, Bambara, and Soninke languages. The dates of the manuscripts range between the late 13th and the early 20th centuries (i.e., from the Islamisation of the Mali Empire until the decline of traditional education in French Sudan). Their subject matter ranges from scholarly works to short letters.

The manuscripts were preserved in the homes of Timbuktu locals before research and digitisation efforts began in the 20th and 21st century.

The manuscripts, and other cultural heritage in Mali, were imperilled during the Mali War. 4,203 of Timbuktu's manuscripts were burned or stolen following between 2012 and 2013. Some 350,000 manuscripts were transported to safety, and 300,000 of them were still in Bamako in 2022.

== History ==
Scribes in Timbuktu translated imported works of numerous well-known individuals (such as Plato, Hippocrates, and Avicenna) as well as reproducing a "twenty-eight volume Arabic language dictionary called The Mukham, written by an Andalusian scholar in the mid-eleventh century." Original books were also written by local authors, covering subjects such as history, religion, law, philosophy and poetry. Legal experts in the city gathered scholarship about Islamic jurisprudence, or fikh, as well as obligatory alms, or zakat. Some manuscripts refer to the movement of stars in relation to the seasons, as part of the Islamic calendar and general time-keeping. The chronicler Mahmud Kati even documented a meteor shower in August 1583, likely to have been the Perseids based on the date:

"In the year 991 in God’s month of Rajab the Godly, after half the night had passed stars flew around as if fire had been kindled in the whole sky—east, west, north and south...It became a nightly flame lighting up the earth, and people were extremely disturbed. It continued until after dawn."

Some manuscripts contain instructions on nutrition and therapeutic properties of desert plants, whilst others debate matters such as "polygamy, moneylending, and slavery." The manuscripts include "catalogues of spells and incantations; astrology; fortune-telling; black magic; necromancy, or communication with the dead by summoning their spirits to discover hidden knowledge; geomancy, or divining markings on the ground made from tossed rocks, dirt, or sand; hydromancy, reading the future from the ripples made from a stone cast into a pool of water; and other occult subjects..." A volume titled Advising Men on Sexual Engagement with Their Women acted as a guide on aphrodasiacs and infertility remedies, as well as offering advice on "winning back" their wives."

The manuscripts were passed down within Timbuktu families and are mostly in poor condition. Most of the manuscripts remain unstudied and uncatalogued, and their total number is unknown, affording only rough estimates. A selection of about 160 manuscripts from the Mamma Haidara Commemorative Library in Timbuktu and the Ahmed Baba collection were digitized by the Tombouctou Manuscripts Project in the 2000s. Beginning in 2013, the Hill Museum & Manuscript Library (HMML) at Saint John's University in Collegeville, Minnesota, partnered with SAVAMA-DCI for a large-scale digitization effort that has photographed more than 150,000 manuscripts. This effort has been supported by the Arcadia Fund. These are being made available through HMML's online Reading Room. In 2017, HMML and the British Library's Endangered Archives Programme launched the Endangered Libraries in Timbuktu (ELIT) project to digitize manuscripts that remained in Timbuktu with the three principal mosques.

With the demise of Arabic education in Mali, especially under French colonial rule, appreciation for the medieval manuscripts declined in Timbuktu and many were being sold off. Time magazine related the account of an imam who picked up four of them for $50 each. In October 2008 one of the households was flooded, destroying 700 manuscripts.

== Research ==
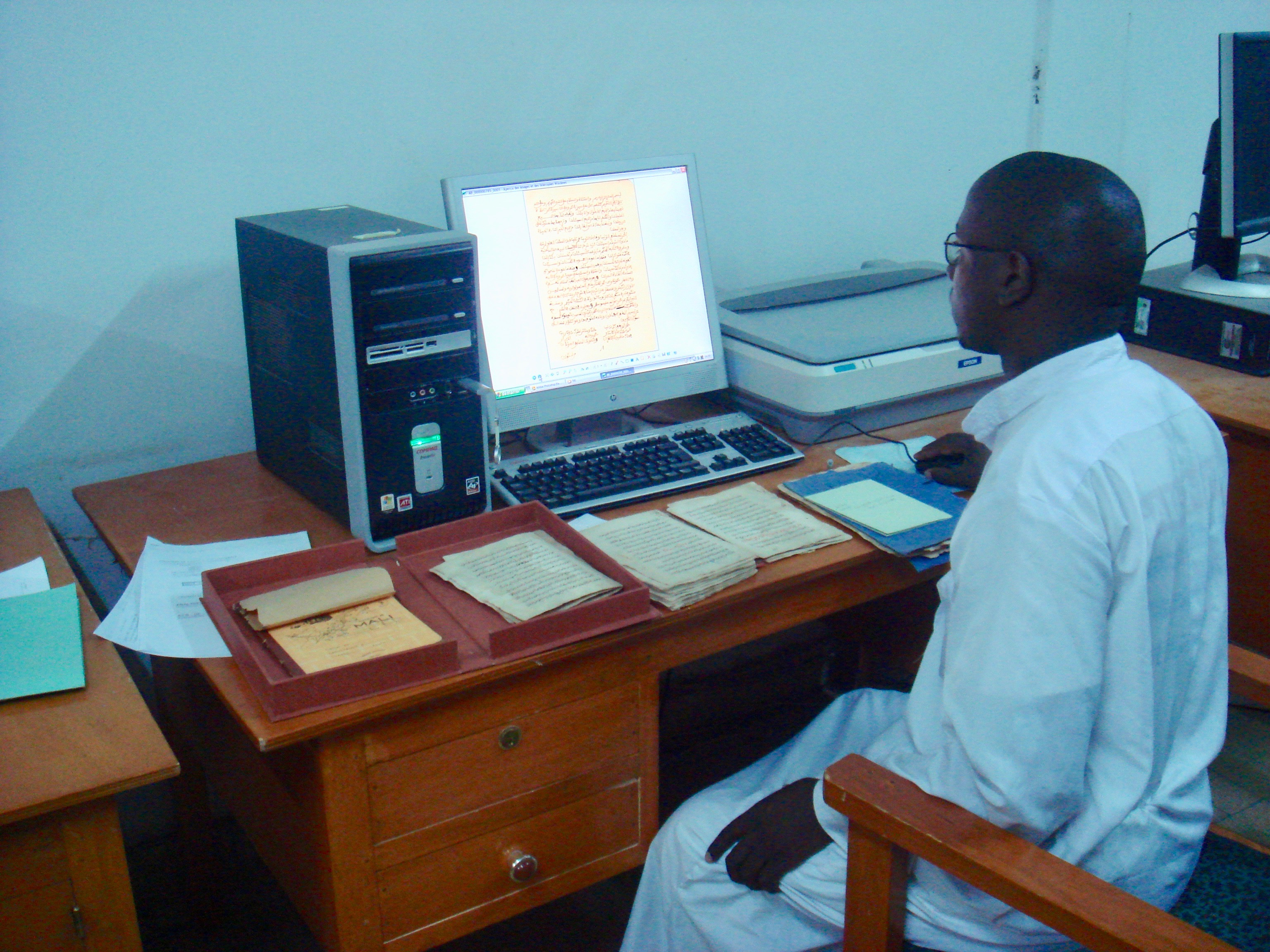
Digitizing ancient documents at the Ahmed Baba Institute of Higher Learning and Islamic Research, 2007

In 1970, UNESCO founded an organization which included among its tasks preservation of the manuscripts, but it went unfunded until 1977. In 1998, Harvard University professor Henry Louis Gates visited Timbuktu for his PBS series Wonders of the African World. The series raised public and academic awareness of the manuscripts, which led to a pool of funding opening up.

The Timbuktu Manuscripts Project was a project of the University of Oslo running from 1999 to 2007, the goal of which was to assist in physically preserving the manuscripts, digitize them and building an electronic catalogue, and making them accessible for research. It was funded by the government of Luxembourg along with the Norwegian Agency for Development Cooperation (NORAD), the Ford Foundation, the Norwegian Council for Higher Education's Programme for Development Research and Education (NUFU), and the United States' Ambassadors Fund for Cultural Preservation. Among the results of the project are: reviving the ancient art of bookbinding and training a solid number of local specialists; devising and setting up an electronic database to catalogue the manuscripts held at the Institut des Hautes Études et de Recherche Islamique – Ahmad Baba (IHERI-AB); digitizing a large number of manuscripts held at the IHERIAB; facilitating scholarly and technical exchange with manuscript experts in Morocco and other countries; reviving IHERI-AB's journal Sankoré; and publishing the illustrated book, The Hidden Treasures of Timbuktu: Rediscovering Africa's Literary Culture.

Since the end of this project, the cooperation of Grand-Duché de Luxembourg has funded a new project called Timbuktu Manuscripts. This project aims at protecting and promoting Timbuktu Manuscripts, for economic, social and cultural development of the area. It is implemented by the Lux-Development agency and the goals are:

1. a better conservation of the manuscripts (100 listed manuscripts, 10 described manuscripts, 2 digitalized manuscripts, 10 restored and protected manuscripts)
2. a better scientific utilisation of the manuscripts
3. use of manuscripts to promote economic, social and cultural development of the area

Since the events in the North of Mali in 2012, the project MLI/015 works with its main partners in Bamako on result 1. These key partners are the IHERI-AB (Institut des Hautes Etudes et de Recherche Islamique Ahmed Baba) and the SAVAMA DCI (Association de Sauvegarde et de Mise en Valeur des Manuscrits et de Défense de la Culture Islamique). Beginning of 2013, they had completed an important work of describing 10,000 manuscripts through standardized registration forms.

The Timbuktu Manuscripts Project is a separate project run by the University of Cape Town. In a partnership with the government of South Africa, which contributed to the Timbuktu trust fund, this project is the first official cultural project of the New Partnership for Africa's Development. It was founded in 2003 and is ongoing. They released a report on the project in 2008. As well as preserving the manuscripts, the Cape Town project also aims to make access to public and private libraries around Timbuktu more widely available. The project's online database is accessible to researchers only. In 2015, it was announced that the Timbuktu trust fund would close after receiving no more funds from the South African government.

Another project was seeded in 2005, when Aluka (which later integrated with JSTOR) began a dialogue with members of library and scholarly communities, expressing its interest in helping to solve some of the challenges faced by libraries in Timbuktu. In January 2007, after a series of meetings and discussions in Cape Town, New York, and Timbuktu, Aluka entered into a formal partnership with SAVAMA-DCI (L’organisation Non Gouvernmentale pour la Sauvegarde et la Valorisation des Manuscrits pour la Defense de la Culture Islamique), a Timbuktu-based NGO whose mission is to help private manuscript libraries in Mali safeguard, preserve, and understand their intellectual treasures. As part of this project, Aluka also partnered with two academic groups, Northwestern University’s Advanced Media Production Studio (NUAMPS), led by Mr. Harlan Wallach, and the Tombouctou Mss Project at the University of Cape Town’s Department of Historical Studies. Some of the images are published in a project report from Aluka. Over 300 digitized manuscripts are available to researchers and were featured in Aluka’s online archive as part of its African Cultural Heritage Sites and Landscapes digital library, which was later integrated with JSTOR.

A book about Timbuktu, published in 2008, contains a chapter with some discussions of a few of the texts.

Digital images of thirty-two manuscripts from the private Mamma Haïdara Library are available from the United States Library of Congress; a subset of these are also accessible from the United Nations' World Digital Library website.

The Centre for the Study of Manuscript Cultures (CSMC) at the University of Hamburg has supported conservation and inventorying efforts at SAVAMA-DCI since 2013, coordinated with HMML's digitization efforts. HMML is now leading a major cataloguing project based on the CSMC's initial metadata, supported by the National Endowment for the Humanities.

== Destruction and evacuation ==
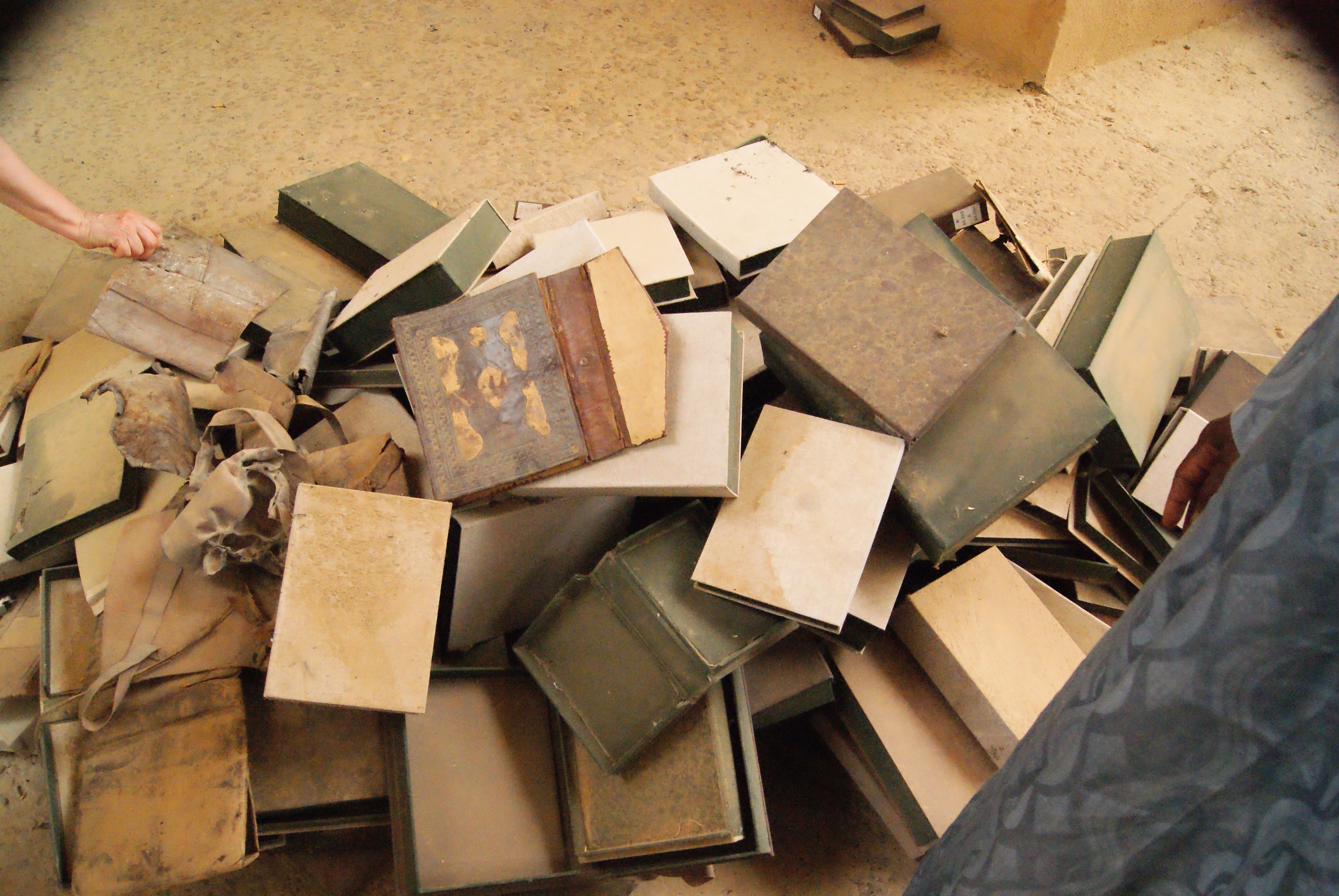
Empty manuscript boxes at IHERI-AB, Timbuktu

4,203 of Timbuktu's manuscripts were burned or stolen following the fall of Timbuktu in the Northern Mali conflict between 2012 and 2013 by the Islamist rebels of Ansar Dine. The Ahmed Baba Institute and a library, both containing thousands of manuscripts, were said to have been burnt as the Islamists retreated from Timbuktu. 90% of these manuscripts were saved by the population organized around the NGO "Sauvegarde et valorisation des manuscrits pour la défense de la culture islamique" (SAVAMA-DCI). Some 350,000 manuscripts were transported to safety, and 300,000 of them were still in Bamako in 2022.

=== History of the evacuation ===
U.S.-based book preservation expert Stephanie Diakité and Dr. Abdel Kader Haidara, curator of one of the most important libraries of Timbuktu, a position handed down in his family for generations, organized the evacuation of the manuscripts to Bamako in the south of Mali. Timbuktu has a long tradition of celebrating and honoring family manuscript collections. It is traditional for a family member to "swear publicly that he will protect the library for as long as he lives." During the evacuation process, Haidara relied on local families to hide the Ahmed Baba Institute's manuscript collection in their homes before the texts were ultimately transported to Bamako. The evacuation was supported by international organizations, such as the Prince Claus Fund for Culture and Development, whose initial commitment was followed by financial support from other organisations such as the Doen Foundation and Ford Foundation. Abdel Kader thanked SAVAMA-DCI and their partners in a letter for enabling the evacuation of the manuscripts to the cities in the south of the country and supporting their storage.

Aboubacry Moussa Lam was a signatory to an appeal to preserve the Timbuktu Manuscripts.

=== Post evacuation ===
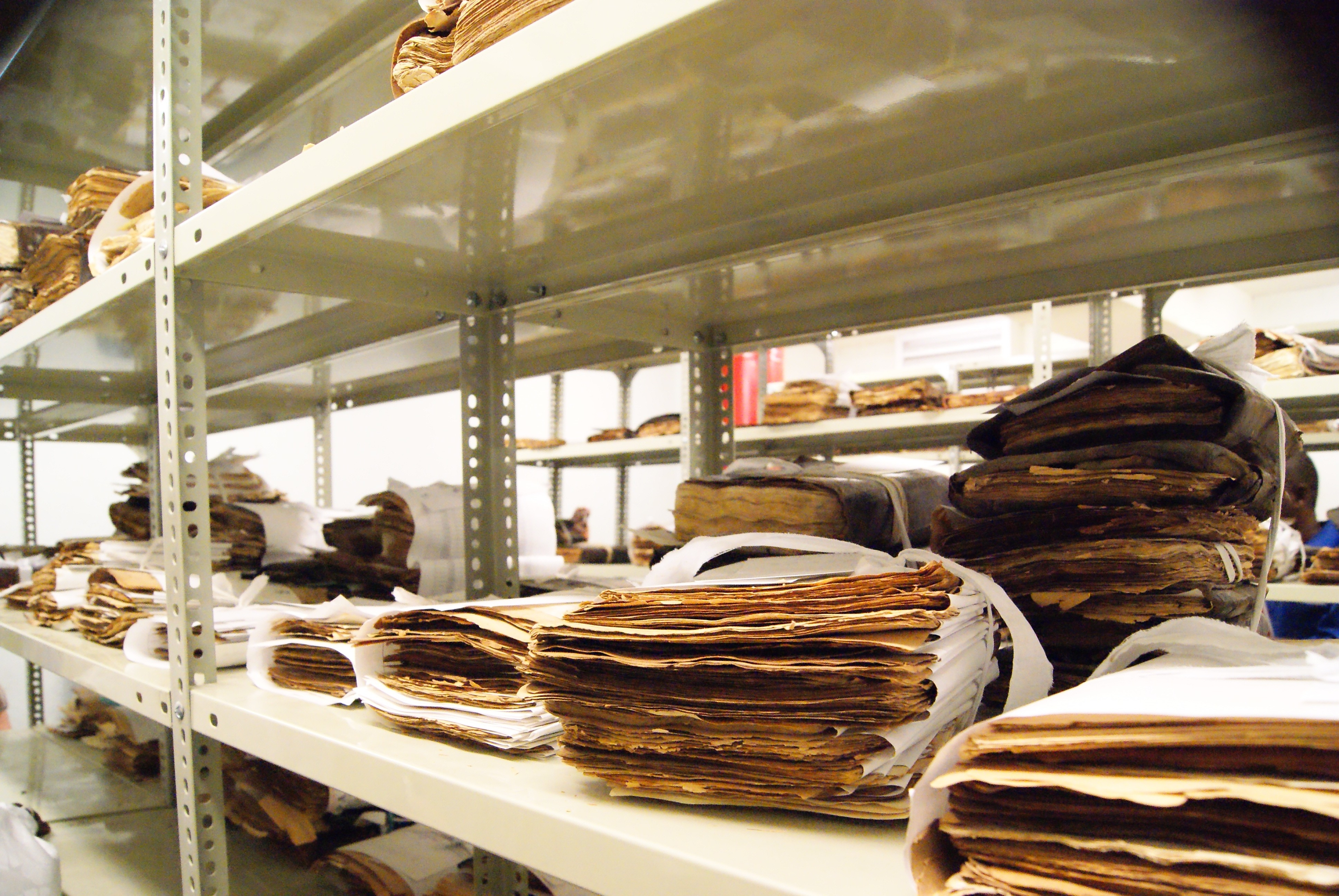
Manuscripts of the Ahmed Baba Centre

Once in the south, the manuscripts faced new dangers: mold and humidity. Stephanie Diakité and Dr. Abdel Kader Haidara began a campaign to raise money for the preservation of the books including a crowd-funding campaign called "Timbuktu Libraries in Exile". Whereas many institutions have provided funding, equipment and/or training, the leading role in all the proceedings is played by the local people.

An international consultation on the safeguarding, accessibility and promotion of ancient manuscripts in the Sahel was held at the UNESCO office in Bamako in 2020.

== Media coverage ==
A movie about the Timbuktu Manuscript Project, The Ancient Astronomers of Timbuktu, was released in 2009 with funding from the Ford Foundation and Oppenheimer Memorial Trust.

The French/German cultural TV channel ARTE produced a feature-length film about Timbuktu's manuscript heritage in 2009 entitled "Tombouctou: les manuscrits sauvés des sables" or "Timbuktus verschollenes Erbe: vom Sande verweht". Another film on the subject entitled "Manuscripts of Timbuktu" was also released in 2009. The film was made by South African director Zola Maseko, executive produced by the South African Broadcasting Corporation and distributed by California Newsreel.

In 2013, BBC Four produced a documentary called "The Lost Libraries of Timbuktu."

In 2016, a book about the manuscripts and the efforts to save them in the midst of the assault and occupation of northern Mali by Islamist jihadis was published. The book, The Bad-Ass Librarians of Timbuktu by Joshua Hammer, provides vivid details about the collection of the manuscripts into libraries and subsequent efforts to remove them to safety during the dangerous conflict, in which the Islamist jihadis threatened to destroy them.

In 2017, journalist Charlie English published The Book Smugglers of Timbuktu (also published as The Storied City: The Quest for Timbuktu and the Fantastic Mission to Save Its Past) which tells in alternating chapters the history of European expeditions to Timbuktu (1795 – 1860) and the rescue efforts undertaken by Haidara and others to save the manuscripts from destruction by jihadists in 2012.

== See also ==
- Sankore Madrasah
- Mamma Haidara Commemorative Library
- Timbuktu Chronicles
- History of Timbuktu
- Genizah, a storage area for ancient documents, religious or secular, in Jewish synagogues
  - Afghan Geniza
  - Cairo Geniza
- Dunhuang manuscripts, a similar cache of ancient documents, in Dunhuang (China)
- Herculaneum papyri, a similar cache of ancient documents, in Herculaneum (Italy)
- List of libraries in the ancient world
