= Fall of Timbuktu =

Military conflict

Coordinates: 16.2667°N 0.0500°W

- Part of the Malian Civil War
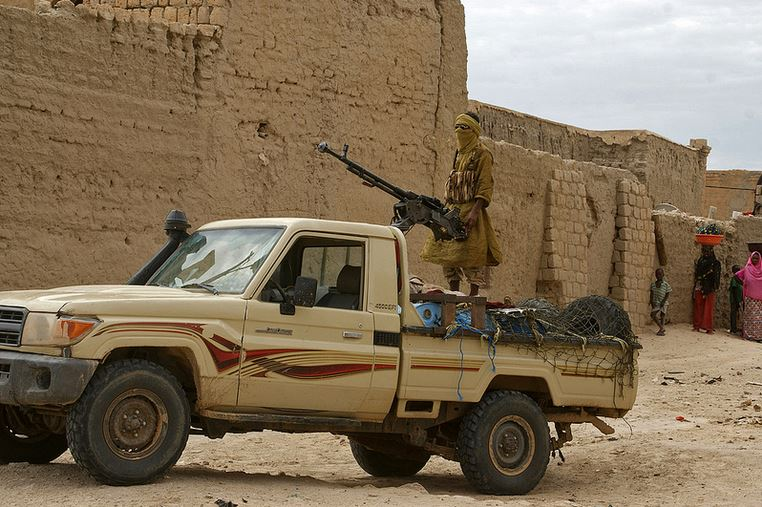
- An Ansar Dine militant in Timbuktu, Mali.
Date	13–29 June 2012
Location	Timbuktu, Mali
Result	Islamist victory: Islamist destruction of Timbuktu heritage sites

Belligerents
Azawad: MNLA	Islamists: Ansar Dine; Al-Qaeda in the Islamic Maghreb

Commanders and leaders
(Azawad) Unknown	Abu Bakr al-Shinquiti

Strength
Unknown	Unknown

Casualties and losses
2–3 killed 4 wounded	2–8 wounded

The Fall of Timbuktu took place during the war in northern Mali. It was one of the first clashes between the MNLA and Ansar Dine, and led to the latter taking control of the city in June 2012.

During the conflict, concerns were raised of threats to the cultural heritage of Timbuktu; numerous shrines and mausoleums in the city were damaged or destroyed, and efforts were made to evacuate the Timbuktu Manuscripts.

== Battle ==
On June 13, 2012, at approximately 10:00 am, an MNLA vehicle arrived at a station at the south-eastern entrance of Timbuktu City, on the Goundam Road. A quarrel started between the separatist fighters and Islamists who guarded the post, with the terrorists demanding that the men of the MNLA to lay down their weapons, which they refuse. Fighting then erupted. An Ansar Dine commander stated that "MNLA defeated elements wanted to move into the city, they were asked to put down their weapons, they refused and started firing, we fought back. Two of our elements were hit in the skirmish but without gravity, they were treated and are doing well " According to Oumar Sall, a member of the High Islamic Council of Timbuktu; "It happened at the eastern exit of Timbuktu, where there is a post held by Ançar Dine. MNLA people wanted to go, but Ançar Dine refused and there was a hang-up." Later, the islamists issued a deadline for the MLNA to leave the city at the end of the month.

== Fall ==
On June 29, Ansar Dine was reported to have taken control of Timbuktu after MNLA fighters followed their deadline to leave town. Residents confirmed the MNLA was no longer present, as the Islamist movements confirmed their control over the entire northern Malian region of Azawad.

== Aftermath ==
=== Destruction of shrines ===
At the same time, UNESCO responded to appeals from the Malian government in Bamako to declare several sites within the city as "endangered" because it "aims to raise cooperation and support for the sites threatened by the armed conflict in the region." On 30 June 2012, a local journalist said that he was told Ansar Dine would start destroying 13 more Sufi cemeteries and mausolea of saints after having destroyed three, including the mausoleum of Sidi Mahmoud Ben Amar. They were then said to have destroyed the mausolea of Sidi El Mokhtar, Alfa Moya and five other sites with pick-axes, hoes and Kalashnikovs.

Despite earlier claims that they had stopped taking down the tombs, on 1 July about 30 members of the group were reported to have continued taking down four more sites with hoes and chisels at the cemetery of Djinguereber Mosque, including that of Cheikh el-Kebir, Sidi Elmety, Mahamane Elmety and Sidi Mahmoudou by late afternoon. Ansar Dine's Omar Ould Hamaha said that

the only tribunal we recognise is the divine court of shariah. The destruction is a divine order. It's our prophet who said that each time that someone builds something on top of a grave, it needs to be pulled back to the ground. We need to do this so that future generations don't get confused, and start venerating the saints as if they are God...We are against tourism. They foster debauchery.

On 2 July there was more destruction, most notably at Sidi Yahya's mausoleum, one of the three "great mosques" in the city built in the 15th century during the Islamic Golden Age, according to UNESCO. The militants broke down the door to the shrine, which, according to a local imam, was not supposed to be opened until the end of days. Sanda Ould Bamana then told the BBC that Ansar Dine had done almost 90% of what it sought to in destroying the mausolea in accordance with sharia, which he said does not permit tombs to be taller than 15 centimetres. Local imam Alpha Abdoulahi said that the militants wanted to "destroy the mystery" of the gateway and that he was offered "50,000 CFA for repairs but I refused to take the money, saying that what they did is irreparable."

In September 2012, Islamists destroyed the mausoleum of Cheik El-Kebir, located 330 kilometers from Gao. The tomb had been venerated by people of the Kunta tribe. Further destruction occurred with four mausoleums being razed on 23 December and an Ansar Dine official, Abou Dardar, being quoted by Agence France-Presse as saying that "not a single mausoleum will remain in Timbuktu."

On 28 January 2013, as French-Malian troops captured Timbuktu Airport, the departing forces set fires within the Ahmed Baba Institute, which they had used as a barracks. Initial reports incorrectly stated that the building and all its contents were destroyed. The fire destroyed or damaged some 4,000 manuscripts, but another 10,000 that were kept in underground storage were undamaged. During the occupation, Timbuktu residents ran great risks to smuggle tens of thousands of other priceless manuscripts to relatively safe locations. The manuscripts that the rebels did destroy had all been previously preserved in digital form.

==== Reactions ====
The MNLA's spokesman Hama Ag Mahmoud, speaking from Nouakchott, said of the destructions that "the perpetrators of these heinous acts, their sponsors, and those who support them must be made accountable." On the 12 July, the MNLA released a statement that read "we call on the USA, France and all other countries who want to stand against Ansar Dine, Boko Haram and al Qaeda who are now holding Timbuktu, Gao and Kidal to help us kill them and help the people in those cities." The MNLA and Tuareg refugees claimed, in interviews with the Western media, that Islamists had only previously bested the MNLA, despite their boasts of the MNLA having more fighters, because of superior firepower and the presence of foreign Islamist groups, like AQIM. An MNLA official in Nouakchott later clarified that they would only fight to remove the Islamists if "we are not the ones to fight the terrorists all alone...it is important that the outside powers help us, to even up the balance of power."

Timbuktu Deputy Mayor Sandy Haidara said of the actions that "it looks as if it is a direct reaction to the UNESCO decision." Ansar Dine's spokesman Sanda Ould Boumama then said that the group "will today destroy every mausoleum in the city. All of them, without exception. God is unique. All of this is haram. We are all Muslims. UNESCO is what?" [We are acting] in the name of God." UNESCO's Executive Committee Chair Alissandra Cummins said that "this is tragic news for us all. I appeal to all those engaged in the conflict in Timbuktu to exercise their responsibility."

UNESCO Director General Irina Bokova called for a stop to the destructions, shortly before the announcement that Ansar Dine had ceased the destructions, according to a local journalist. Haidara's assessment was echoed by the media, which read the action as reacting to UNESCO's decision to put the sites on the endangered list. The chairwoman of UNESCO's 36th session, Yeleonor Mitrofanova, told the World Heritage Committee meeting in Saint Petersburg that she "appealed to all those engaged in the conflict in Timbuktu to exercise their responsibility – for the sake of future generations, spare the legacy of their past" A source reported to be affiliated to a local imam was quoted as saying that Ansar Dine had "raped Timbuktu today. It is a crime."

United Nations Representative for West Africa Said Djinnit said that the events "confirm the hold that terrorist groups have on Mali’s north, which worsens the humanitarian position of local people." United Nations Secretary-General Ban Ki-moon's spokesman Martin Nesirky quoted Moon as saying: "Such attacks against cultural heritage sites are totally unjustified," while adding that "the secretary-general calls on all parties to exercise their responsibility to preserve the cultural heritage of Mali." The International Criminal Court's Chief Prosecutor Fatou Bensouda warned "those involved in these criminal acts is clear: stop the destruction of the religious buildings now. This is a war crime which my office has authority to fully investigate." She cited Mali's accession to Article 8 of the Rome Statute that says any "deliberate attacks against undefended civilian buildings which are not military objectives are a war crime." The sixty-seventh session of the United Nations General Assembly also expressed concern about the regions UNESCO sites to the Director General of the Islamic Educational, Scientific and Cultural Organization, the President of the African Union Commission and the Chair of ECOWAS.

The Organisation of the Islamic Conference issued a statement that read the sites were "part of the rich Islamic heritage of Mali and should not be allowed to be destroyed and put in harm's way by bigoted extremist elements." ECOWAS also issued a statement after a meeting in Ouagadougou that read: "They are asking the International Criminal Court to proceed with necessary investigations to identify those responsible for war crimes and to take the necessary action against them." [sic] It also called on Mali to ask the UN to support a military intervention against the groups in Azawad.

The Malian government called the actions "destructive fury," assimilable to "war crimes" and threatened action through Malian and international channels. Mali's Foreign Minister Sadio Lamine Sow said from Algiers that Mali would "do everything to recover our territory;" while the Culture and Tourism Minister Diallo Fadima Touré called on the UN on 1 July, to "take concrete steps to stop these crimes against the cultural heritage of my people." Protesters in Bamako rallied against the Islamist takeover on 4 July.

France's Communications Director and Chief Spokesperson at the Central Administration Bernard Valero said: "France condemns the deliberate destruction of the tombs of Muslim saints in the city of Timbuktu by an Islamist extremist group which controls this city. We appeal for an end to this violence and this intolerance. The systematic violation of these places of reverence and prayer, which for centuries have been part of the soul of this famed sub-Saharan city, constitutes an intolerable act." The Russia Foreign Ministry condemned the action as "barbarian. Such acts can only arouse indignation." The United States' State Department spokeswoman Victoria Nuland also added that "the United States strongly condemns the destruction of the UNESCO world heritage sites in Timbuktu by Islamic militants. We call on all parties to protect Mali's heritage." Namibian President Hifikepunye Pohamba said at the General debate of the sixty-seventh session of the United Nations General Assembly that he rejected the attempt to secede, as well as the wanton destructions of the sites. Prime Minister Cheick Modibo Diarra also called for an immediate international intervention to restore Bamako's writ; he was supported by Niger. It was also affirmed at the same forum by Ivory Coast, who had a similar external intervention during the 2010–2011 Ivorian crisis, and former imperial overlord France's Francois Hollande who supported an African intervention.

The head of the Tombouctou Manuscripts Project at the University of Cape Town, Shamil Jeppie, said that the destruction was akin to that of the Buddhas of Bamiyan. "It's a real loss for people in the town, in the region and on the continent. Timbuktu was a center of Islamic learning, a very significant center — there is lots of internal and external evidence of this. But Ansar Dine is ignorant of this. For them, there is only one book and it's the Quran. All this other (Islamic) learning is inconsequential to them." The Chairman of the Malian Manuscript Foundation Michael Covitt, said from New York that the action led to "generations and generations of culture being destroyed." However, early estimates of the extent of the destruction were overstated. Timbuktu residents successfully saved more than 300,000 manuscripts by hiding or smuggling them out of Timbuktu. No more than 4,000 documents were lost or damaged when rebels set fires within the Ahmed Baba Institute, and all of them belonged to a set that had been copied by digitization. However, many of the preserved manuscripts were damaged in the process of rescuing and hiding them. In 2014 UNESCO appealed for assistance to conserve and restore the Timbuktu manuscripts and to continue making digital copies.

Voice of America reported that people in the city say the actions of Ansar Dine as unrelated to Islamic thought and teachings, but instead targeted at avenging the threats of the "international community" and the Western world-led war on terror. Timbuktu MP in the National Assembly of Mali, Haïdara El Hadji Baba, said that "Ansar Dine’s real motivation in doing this was to defy the international community;” he cited the destructions as emanating after UNESCO's classification of the shrines as "in danger." He further warned that after Bensouda told the French media on 1 July that the actions could be called war crimes there could be more to come. "With its condemnations the international community is only intensifying Ansar Dine's desire to destroy." UNESCO's World Heritage Centre's Africa head, Lazare Eloundou Assomo, refused responsibility for the action in saying that it was "normal" for supranational bodies to denounce the destruction of what she termed "world heritage." She added: "Would you have UNESCO remain silent about this? No. It’s crucial that we declare that these sites are important to the entire world and it’s everyone’s responsibility to protect them." While Reuters was similarly critical of the move, it also cited Ansar Dine's Sanda Ould Boumama speaking to Radio France Internationale saying that "human beings cannot be elevated higher than God ... When the Prophet entered Mecca, he said that all the mausoleums should be destroyed. And that's what we're repeating."

== International Criminal Court ==
On 27 September 2016 the International Criminal Court (ICC) found Ahmad al-Faqi al-Mahdi, an islamist member of the Ansar Dine, guilty of war crime of attacks against religious and historic buildings by deliberately destroying nine mausoleums and the secret gate of the Sidi Yahya Mosque between 30 June and 11 July 2012 and sentenced him to 9 years in prison in a landmark case that was the first successful prosecution focusing solely on the destruction of a World Heritage Site. He pleaded guilty. It also found al-Mahdi must pay $3.2 million in collective reparations to the Timbuktu community for the damage he caused.

== Reconstruction ==
Local masons have reconstructed many monuments in Timbuktu, and UNESCO Director General Irina Bokova visited the site and praised the Malian government.

== See also ==
- Battle of Timbuktu and Second Battle of Timbuktu, which both took place in 2013
- Buddhas of Bamiyan, a World Heritage Site in Afghanistan that was destroyed by the Taliban.
- Aftermath of the Libyan civil war, in which similar destruction of Sufi sites took place.
