= HMRC Vigilant (1947) =

British naval trawler

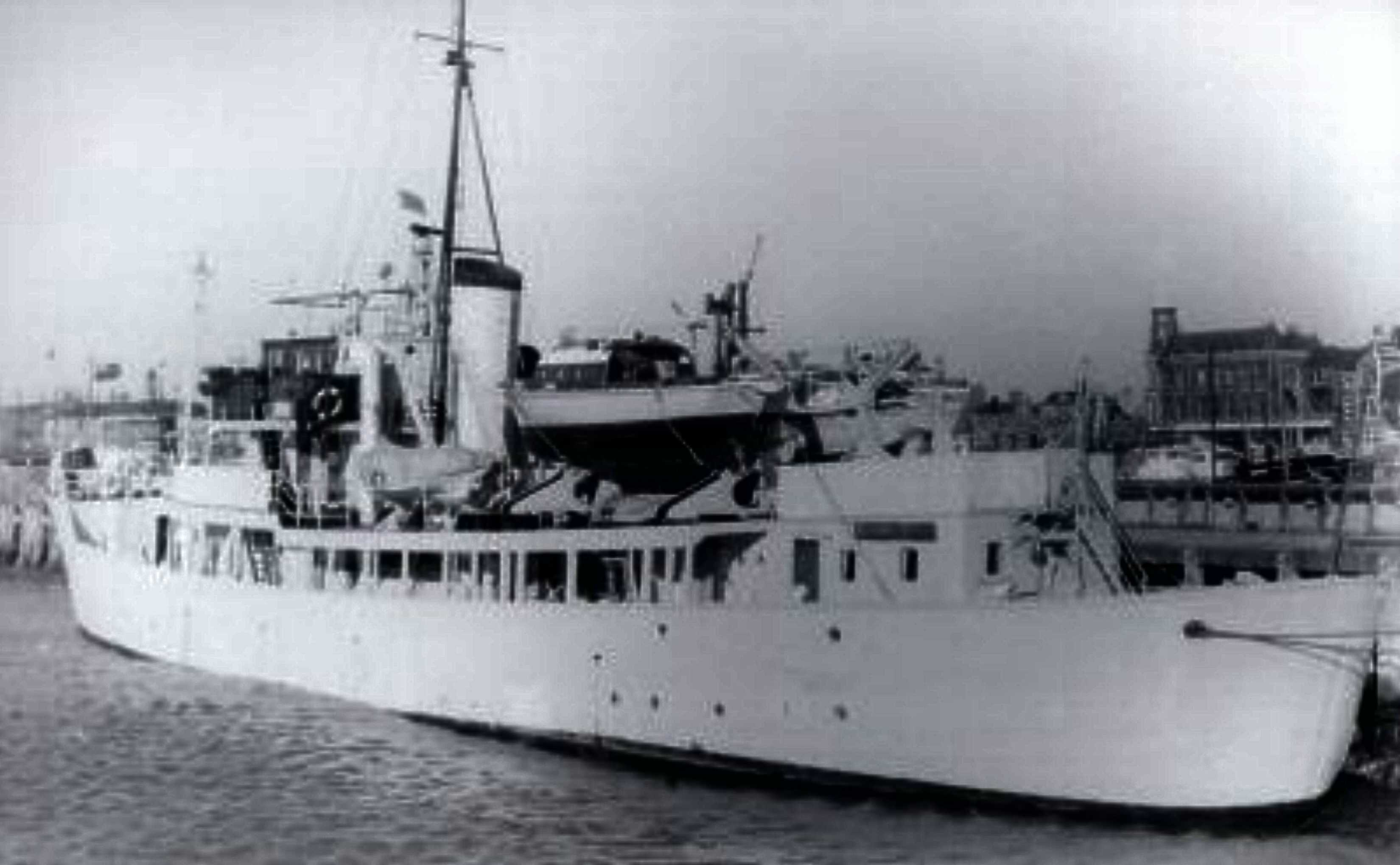
- HMRC Vigilant in about 1959

History

United Kingdom
- Name: HMS Benbecula
- Namesake: Benbecula
- Builder: Cook, Welton & Gemmell, Beverley
- Launched: 28 October 1943
- Commissioned: 13 January 1944
- Fate: Sold March 1946.

History

United Kingdom
- Name: HMRC Vigilant
- Acquired: 1946
- Fate: Sold 1964, hulked 1982

General characteristics
- Class & type: Isles-class naval trawler
- Displacement: 545 long tons (554 t)
- Length: 164 ft (50 m)
- Beam: 27 ft 8 in (8.43 m)
- Draught: 11 ft 1 in (3.38 m)
- Installed power: 850 ihp (634 kW)
- Propulsion: Triple-expansion reciprocating steam engine; 1 shaft
- Speed: 12 knots (22 km/h; 14 mph)
- Complement: 40

HMRC Vigilant was an Isles-class naval trawler, formerly HMS Benbecula, acquired by the HM Customs and Excise in 1946, and fitted out for service with the Customs.

She took part in many clandestine operations in co-operation with the Investigations Branch of HM Customs and Excise, against smuggling. Initially, from 1947 until 1953, she was based in Gravesend Reach on the River Thames, commanded by Peter de Neumann. In 1953 her base was moved to Southampton Water. Vigilant was ocean going and by far the largest vessel ever operated by HM Customs and Excise. Her Commander and Chief Officer each had to hold Foreign-Going Master's certificates, as well as receiving HM Customs Commissions. She sometimes voyaged to the fishing grounds of Newfoundland Banks, off Iceland, into the Baltic, and The North and Irish Seas.

The first ever live outside TV broadcast from a ship was made from her during the 1950 General Agreement on Tariffs and Trade (GATT) conference in Torquay. Stafford Cripps, the then Chancellor of the Exchequer, lived and entertained aboard her during the conference.
