= Dockmaster =

A dockmaster is a person in charge of a dock used for freight, logistics, and repair or maintenance of ships (a shipyard or drydock). This title is distinct from harbormaster, which is sometimes a higher rank than dockmaster. A dockmaster is assisted by a deputy dockmaster and an assistant dockmaster.

For example, in the Port of London in the United Kingdom, shipping movements in dock complexes, and within a short distance of the outer lock gates (i.e. in the tidal river), are under the jurisdiction of a dockmaster and staff. Each assistant dockmaster has a marine staff of about 70. In all, each dock complex employed about 360 marine staff. The Port of London consists of all the tidal portions of the River Thames from Margate on the south coast, Clacton-on-Sea on the north, through to Teddington a total of around 95 miles (153 km). Up until the 1980s the Port of London Authority (PLA) dockmasters were responsible for five large enclosed dock systems and miles of quayside isolated from the tides by locks. These systems were London and St Katharine Docks, Surrey Commercial Docks, West India and Millwall Docks, Royal Docks, and Tilbury Docks. Of these only Tilbury is operational, along with DP World's London Gateway. Eventually Tilbury Docks were privatized and became the Port of Tilbury, with their dockmaster being redesignated as harbourmaster; this led to the PLA harbourmaster being redesignated chief harbourmaster.

"Dockmaster" could also refer to :

DockMaster (Product) A ropeless docking and charging system for electric boats by Lemvos.

DockMaster (Software) A marina management software platform used by marinas, boatyards, and marine dealerships. Originally developed over four decades ago, the software includes modules for sales, service management, point of sale, inventory control, accounting, and marina operations.
