= Ahmed Baba Institute =

Library and research centre in Timbuktu, Mali

Coordinates: 16°46′35″N 3°0′19″W

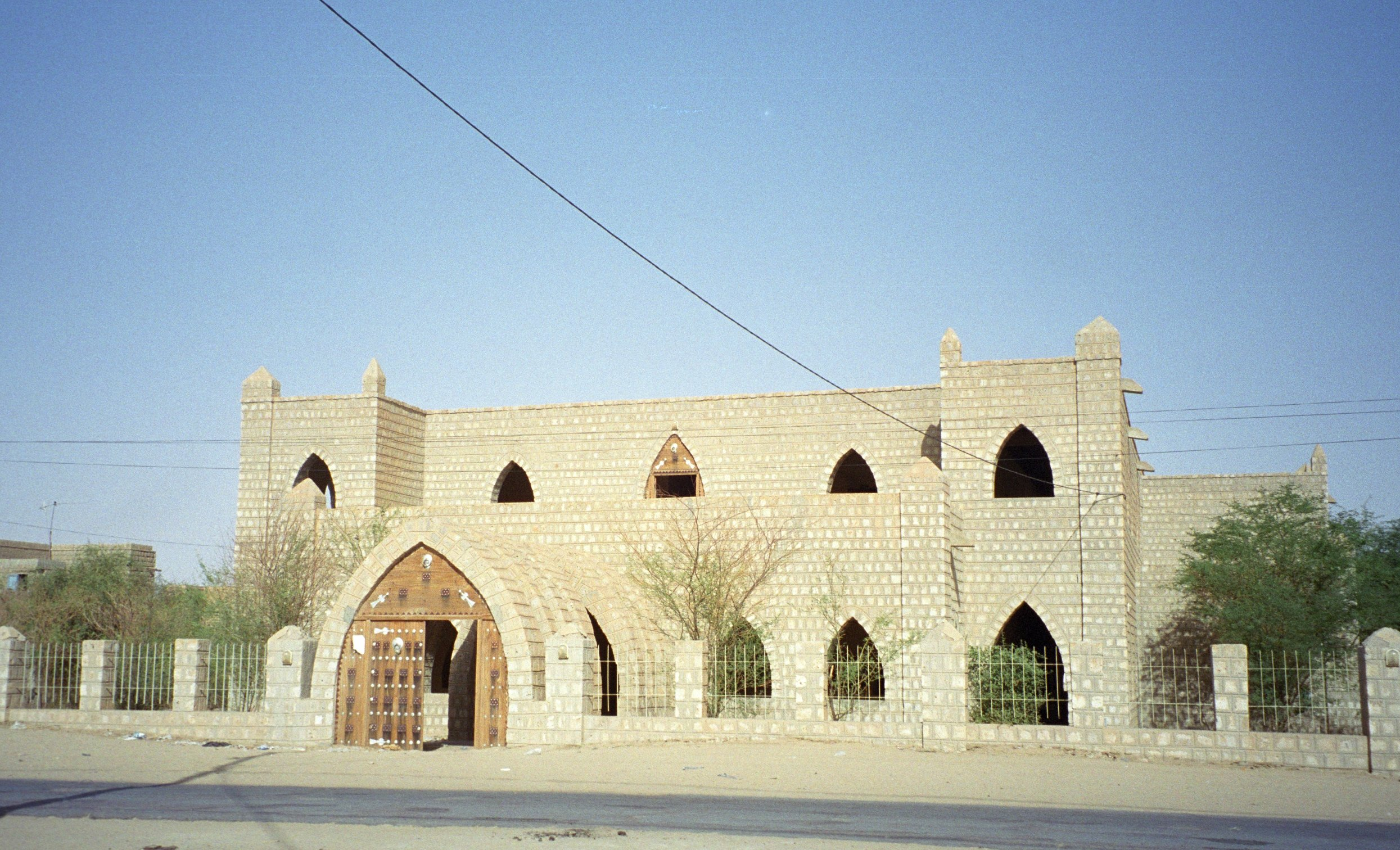
- The old building of the Ahmed Baba Institute of Higher Learning and Islamic Research
- Interactive map of the Ahmed Baba Institute area

General information
- Location: Timbuktu, Mali
- Completed: 2009
- Cost: 5.8 million euros
- Client: Kuwait

Design and construction
- Architect: South-African architect

The Ahmed Baba Institute, officially the Ahmed Baba Institute of Higher Learning and Islamic Research, is a library and research centre in Timbuktu. The centre was founded in 1973, with financing primarily from Kuwait. It was named after 17th-century Timbuktu scholar Ahmad Baba al Massufi.

== Building ==
The current building was designed by a South-African architect and finished in 2009, costing around 5.8 million euros. It has an area of 4,600 sq metres and includes an air conditioning system for the proper preservation of the manuscripts housed in it, as well as an automatic fire-fighting system. It replaced a 40-year-old crumbling building.

== Manuscripts ==
The centre holds approximately 20,000 manuscripts covering Mali's history, including the Tarikh al-Sudan. The majority of the manuscripts are from the 14th to 16th centuries, and most are written in Arabic but others are in local languages, such as Songhai, Tamashek and Bamanankan, or even in more distant ones, one each in Turkish and Hebrew, with topics covering medicine, astronomy, poetry, literature and Islamic law.

A program to digitize the manuscripts is under way, run by Norway and Luxembourg under UNESCO supervision, with only a fraction of them having been scanned as of January 2013.

Among the manuscripts is "Reminder to those who do not pay attention to the harms caused by the divergence between believers" (Tadkirat al gāfilin ‘anqubhihtilāf al- mu’minin), a 19th century acrostic poem which discusses how peace could be attained between the Sokoto Caliphate and the Borno Empire. In 2017, this was added by UNESCO to its Memory of the World international register, recognising it as having global importance.

== Arson ==
On January 28, 2013, as French-led Malian troops captured the airport of Timbuktu, fleeing Tuareg Islamists set fire to the building which they had been using as sleeping quarters. Before and during the occupation, more than 300,000 Timbuktu Manuscripts from the Institute and from private libraries were saved and moved to more secure locations. In July 2014 UNESCO joined the Ahmed Baba Institute in an urgent appeal for financial assistance to preserve, restore, and digitize the manuscripts.
