= Al-Furqan Islamic Heritage Foundation =

Non-profit organization in London, England

- Founder: Ahmed Zaki Yamani
- Established: 1998
- Mission: Preservation of Islamic manuscripts
- Address: 22A Old Court Place, W8 4PL
- Location: London, England
- Website: http://www.al-furqan.com

Al-Furqan Islamic Heritage Foundation is a London-based non-profit institution which is primarily concerned with promoting "the study, cataloguing, publication, preservation and conservation of Islamic manuscripts throughout the world."

It was founded by the former Saudi oil minister Ahmed Zaki Yamani in 1988. Since then it has published many works in the field of Islamic manuscripts, primary among them is the World Survey of Islamic Manuscripts, which catalogues manuscripts in over one hundred countries, and has been described as "a pioneering work which includes hitherto unknown collections."

To support its research, al-Furqan established a reference library, which has over 10,000 volumes.
