= Battle of Tabankort =

The Battle of Tabankort may refer to:

- Battle of Tabankort (2014)
- Battle of Tabankort (2015)
- Battle of Tabankort (2019)
