= Kawinza =

- Village
- Location in Mali
- Coordinates: 15°46′48″N 4°31′21″W
- Country: Mali
- Region: Tombouctou
- Cercle: Niafunké
- Time zone: UTC+0 (GMT)

Kawinza is a village and archaeological site in Niafunké Cercle, Timbuktu Region, Mali. It was excavated extensively from 1984 by Téréba Togola, Michael Rainbault and Roderick and Susan McIntosh. Pottery such as vases and fragments were discovered in January of that year. They discovered tumuli here in 1986 and also in Toyla and Tissalaten. The Kawinza tumuli are dated to 670–880 AD.
