= Dandara =

Dandara can refer to:

- An Dandara (born 1940), Cambodian sailor
- Dandara (given name), feminine given name

- Dandara dos Palmares (1654–1694), Afro-Brazilian warrior also referred to mononymously as "Dandara"

- Dandara (video game), 2018 Metroidvania video game
- Dandara.com, developer of the V Building in Birmingham, UK
- Dendera, city in Qadi Governorate, Egypt
