= Battle of Anéfis (2014) =

Engagement in the Mali War

- Part of the Mali War
Date	July 11, 2014
Location	Anéfis, Mali
Result	Loyalist victory

Belligerents
MAA-Loyalist; GATIA; CM-FPR II	MNLA; MAA-Dissident; HCUA

Commanders and leaders
Yoro Ould Daha; El Hadj Ag Gamou; Bojan †	Sidi Brahim Ould Sidati

Casualties and losses
35 killed 5 prisoners (per MNLA)	111 dead, hundreds injured, 17 prisoners (per loyalists); 4 killed, 10 injured (per MNLA); 37 killed (per Mali)

On July 11, 2014, clashes broke out between pro-government militias led by GATIA and rebel militias led by the National Movement for the Liberation of Azawad (MNLA) in Anefif, Mali. The battle was the first major confrontation between pro-government militias and rebel groups since the start of the Mali War in 2012.

== Background ==
On May 21, 2014, MNLA, HCUA, and rebel MAA fighters captured the city of Kidal after the Second Battle of Kidal. Malian forces retreated to Gao, abandoning the town of Anefis along the way. Malian forces had initially captured Anefis during the Second Battle of Anefis in June 2013. Rebel fighters recaptured the city on May 21, following the Malians that were retreating.

On May 24, clashes broke out in Tabankort, a town in Gao region a few miles away from Anefis. Little is known about the circumstances behind the clashes. While the MNLA accused MUJAO for attacking the group, French media reported that the clashes were a result of boiled-over tensions between pro-government and rebel factions of the Arab Movement of Azawad (MAA). Clashes again broke out in Tabankort on July 2, between the MNLA and pro-government MAA forces. The MNLA mentioned in a press release on July 8 that Malian forces were supporting pro-government militias in the area of Adanane Nakafar, near Anefis. They also accused pro-government forces of looting civilians in Tarkint. This garnered scrutiny from Hervé Ladsous, the UN secretary general of peacekeeping operations.

== Forces present ==
In a July 11 press release, the MNLA accused the Malian army "supported by militias affiliated with MOJWA and El Hadj Ag Gamou" of attacking MNLA positions in Anefis. This statement was revised in a second press release on July 13, which stated the Malian Army was not present and instead mentioned a coalition of rebels including GATIA led by Gamou, pro-government factions of the MAA, and MOJWA militants and drug traffickers. The Malian Army denied involvement or presence in Anefis, and was corroborated by Ladsous, who stated that the Malian army had left that area months ago.

Malian media stated that the clashes were primarily between the pro-government faction of the MAA led by Ahmed Sidi Ould Mohamed and pro-independence side led by Sidi Brahim Ould Sidati. Malian newspaper Le Temoin also stated that GATIA and the Songhai CM-FPR II were involved in the fighting at Anefis. These forces were led by an Imghad Tuareg named Bojan who had just returned from fighting in Libya.

== Battle ==
The MNLA claimed that pro-government forces attacked their positions in Anefis at 5am on July 11. They claimed to have fought back in self-defense, and accused the militias of violating the ceasefire. An MAA fighter who participated in the clashes however, alleged that they began on July 9. Both groups claimed victory in the attack, with the MNLA claiming that they pushed the pro-government fighters back to Tabankort and encircled them, and that the pro-government fighters took civilians hostage. The pro-government coalition instead claimed that there was a divide within the rebels, and that French forces and MINUSMA intervened.

Pro-government militias were in control of Anefis by the beginning of the battle of Tabankort a week later.

== Aftermath ==
MNLA forces claimed that five rebels were injured and thirty-five pro-government fighters were killed, six pro-government vehicles destroyed, and dozens injured. Moussa Ag Attaher, spokesman for the MNLA, affirmed the statement and added that four MNLA fighters were killed. In the revised statement, the MNLA stated that several dozen pro-government fighters were killed, five were taken hostage, and several vehicles were destroyed or captured. They also claimed to have had five more injured.

A pro-government MAA fighter stated that dozens of MNLA fighters were killed, eleven taken prisoner, and that one vehicle was captured and one was destroyed. An MAA report stated fourteen MNLA fighters were killed and four were injured. Abidine Ould Mohamed, deputy secretary-general of the MAA, stated that twenty-four rebels were killed, seventeen were captured, and four vehicles were seized.

Malian media Malijet stated thirty-seven MNLA fighters were killed and several hundred were injured. This was corroborated by Reuters. Malian newspaper Le Temoin stated that 111 rebels were killed, including forty-seven rebel MAA, thirty-seven MNLA, twenty-seven HCUA, and over 125 were injured.

Clashes broke out again on July 16 in Tabankort between the two groups.
