= Toyla =

- Location in Mali
- Coordinates: 16°17′50″N 3°29′50″W
- Country: Mali
- Region: Tombouctou
- Cercle: Diré
- Time zone: UTC+0 (GMT)

Toyla is an archaeological site in Diré Cercle, Timbuktu Region, Mali, southeast of Goundam, towards Diré. It was excavated extensively in the 1980s by Téréba Togola, Michael Rainbault and Roderick and Susan McIntosh. They discovered tumuli here in 1986, dated to 880 - 990 AD.
