= Sultan Ould Bady =

Malian jihadist and drug trafficker

- Born: Abdou Aïssa
- Allegiance: AQIM (2000s-2011); MOJWA (2011-2012); Ansar Dine (2013) al-Mourabitoun (2013-2015); AQIM (2015-2017/2018); ISGS (2017/2018)
- Known for: Co-founding MOJWA, commanding Katiba Salahaddin
- Conflicts: War in the Sahel; Mali War

Abdou Aïssa, nom de guerre: Sultan Ould Bady, is a Malian jihadist and drug trafficker. He co-founded the Movement for Oneness and Jihad in West Africa (MOJWA) with Hamada Ould Mohamed Kheirou and Ahmed al-Tilemsi, and founded Katibat Salahaddin, a katiba within MOJWA that later reformed in the Islamic State in the Greater Sahara after Bady defected.

== Biography ==
Bady descends from an Arab and Tuareg family, but associates himself with the Lemhar Arabs.

Bady was arrested on December 7, 2010, by the Mauritanian army in a convoy of drug traffickers. Bady was referred to as a link between drug traffickers in the Polisario Front and Al-Qaeda in the Islamic Maghreb (AQIM), while also having connections with the Algerian DRS. Bady was alleged to have also kidnapped and resold European tourists in the Sahara before joining AQIM, but this couldn't be confirmed by Mauritanian authorities at the time.

Bady joined AQIM between 2006 and 2010. Le Figaro states Bady could've also been part of AQIM as early as 2001 or 2002, after being recruited by Mokhtar Belmokhtar. When he first joined AQIM, he fought in Katiba Abou Zeid. He participated in several kidnappings of hostages, including the kidnapping of two Canadian diplomats in Niger in 2008 under the command of Belmokhtar. Bady also kidnapped two Swiss nationals and three Spaniards in 2009, and two Algerian diplomats in 2012 in Gao. Yoro Ould Daha, a former official of MOJWA who defected to the Arab Movement of Azawad (MAA), stated Bady was personally involved in the kidnapping of Gilberto Rodrigues Leal in 2012 in Gao.

Ould Bady founded the Movement for Oneness and Jihad in West Africa (MOJWA) in 2011 with Hamada Ould Mohamed Kheirou and Ahmed al-Tilemsi. He took part in the Mali War when it broke out in 2012, founding Katiba Salahaddin, one of the four katibas in MOJWA. Katiba Salahaddin was led by Bady and Adnan Abu Walid al-Sahrawi, and many fighters came from Gao or Kidal region.

On January 2, 2013, Bady defected from MOJWA and left to join Ansar Dine with his katiba. While the reasons for the defection are unknown, Mohamed Ould Ramadane, a spokesperson for the MAA, stated that Katiba Salahaddin left after the UN designated MOJWA as a terrorist group, and that they wanted to avoid international condemnation. On October 23, 2013, Bady claimed responsibility for the 2013 Tessalit attack. He then claimed responsibility for the December 14, 2013, 2013 Kidal attack that killed two Senegalese peacekeepers, and then the firing of nine rockets towards the MINUSMA camp in Aguelhok in August 2014.

Bady formed his own group in late 2013, but joined al-Mourabitoun shortly afterwards and later rejoined AQIM. Bady claimed responsibility for an attack on a MINUSMA convoy in October 2014 that led to the deaths of nine Nigerien peacekeepers. Around this time, Bady was in active armed conflict with his former comrades from MOJWA. He then fled to Sirte in Libya briefly during French intervention in Mali.

Bady joined the Islamic State in the Greater Sahara in 2017 or early 2018. He then participated with his Katiba in attacks against GATIA and MSA fighters in Ménaka. He lost his two training camps in the region in 2018, and was faced with heavy pressure by French and Tuareg forces. He fled to Niger, and found himself in Algeria.

On August 11, 2018, he surrendered to Algerian authorities in Tamanrasset, likely seeking benefit from Algerian amnesty laws that remained in force from the Algerian Civil War.
