= Soumpi =

- Commune and village
- Location in Mali
- Coordinates: 15°50′45″N 4°19′18″W
- Country: Mali
- Region: Tombouctou Region
- Cercle: Niafunké Cercle

Area
  - Total: 1,505 km^{2} (581 sq mi)

Population (2009 census)
  - Total: 16,590
  - Density: 11.02/km^{2} (28.55/sq mi)
- Time zone: UTC+0 (GMT)

Soumpi is a village and commune of the Cercle of Niafunké in the Tombouctou Region of Mali. Lac Soumpi is a lake of note here, as is the archaeological site of Tissalaten.

The commune also has military base, that has been attacked during the Mali Civil War. On January 27, 2018 the nearby military base was attacked by 30 fighters of JNIM and Coalition of the People of Azawad, who temporarily took over the base and pillaged it. The base was also targeted by drone attack on May 26th, 2025 by Azawad forces, who claimed to have caused 2 deaths and 11 injuries. The base was also attacked by JNIM militants on 8 November 2025, killing 20, including the base commander.
