= Battle of Tabankort (2015) =

- Part of Mali War
Date	January 16–20, 2015
Location	Tabankort, Gao Region, Mali
Result	Platform-MINUSMA victory

Belligerents
Platform; GATIA; MAA-Loyalist; CM-FPR II; MINUSMA; Netherlands	CMA; MNLA; HCUA; MAA-Dissident

Casualties and losses
5 killed (per Platform); 25+ injured (per MINUSMA)	11 killed (per CMA); 21 injured (per CMA); 26 killed (per Platform)

Between January 16 and 20, 2015, Platform and the Coordination of Azawad Movements clashed in the town of Tabankort, Gao Region, Mali. The clashes sparked a conflict between the CMA and the Dutch contingent of MINUSMA, which led to a controversial demilitarized zone.

== Prelude ==
In July 2014, fighting broke out between the pro-government militias of Platform and the rebel Coordination of Azawad Movements (CMA) coalition. Platform consists of the GATIA, the loyalist faction of the Arab Movement of Azawad (MAA) led by Yoro Ould Daha, and the Coordination of Movements and Patriotic Resistance Front (CM-FPR II), and the CMA consists of the National Movement for the Liberation of Azawad (MNLA), High Council for the Unity of Azawad (HCUA), and the MAA's dissident faction led by Sidi Ould Brahim Sidati.

Following the fighting, Platform exercised control over Tabankort, and the CMA had control over the nearby town of Anefif. Both sides accused the other of looting and other abuses against the civilian population of the other town. On January 17, the CMA announced it had "Initiated a major operation aimed at dismantling" Platform.

== Battle ==
Between January 16 and 17, skirmishes broke out between Platform and CMA fighters in Tabankort, although no casualties were reported. The CMA, on January 19, held their positions in the town and asked the MINUSMA peacekeepers stationed there to leave. The contingent, manned by Dutch peacekeepers, refused.

On January 20, a Dutch helicopter intervened in a clash between Platform and the CMA, with the Dutch firing six missiles at an MNLA vehicle carrying heavy weapons. MINUSMA released a statement stated that it had been "forced to use force" after warning shots were not heeded. The CMA denied firing on the peacekeepers, and accused MINUSMA of breaking neutrality. The CMA also threatened to void any security collaboration with MINUSMA, but would not break the ceasefire. Fighting continued that sameday between Platform and the CMA.

Two hundred demonstrators occupied the Kidal Airport and threw stones at peacekeepers in the city following the attack. The protests ended the next day, and traditional leaders called for calm.

== Aftermath ==
The CMA initially accused MINUSMA of the deaths of five fighters and the injuries of twenty others. When the victims were brought back to Kidal on the 21st, eleven CMA fighters were killed and twenty-one were injured. Platform claimed the loss of five fighters and two vehicles, and claimed to have discovered twenty-eight CMA bodies. They also claimed to have destroyed fourteen rebel vehicles and weapons. In its March 2015 report, the UN stated six GATIA fighters were killed and at least twenty-five Platform fighters were injured.

On January 24, MINUSMA and the CMA agreed on a demilitarized zone between Anefif and Almoustarat that was ten kilometers wide. Residents of Gao protested against the zone, sparking clashes with Rwandan peacekeepers who opened fire, killing three civilians and injuring four others. The project was scrapped by MINUSMA on January 28.
