= Berthé Aïssata Bengaly =

Malian politician (1957–2024)

Minister of the Craft Industry and Tourism
- In office 8 September 2013 – 10 January 2015
- President: Ibrahim Boubacar Keita
- Prime Minister: Oumar Tatam Ly; Moussa Mara
- Preceded by: Yaya Ag Mohamed Ali
- Succeeded by: N'Diaye Ramatoulaye Diallo

Minister for the Promotion of Women, Children, and the Family
- In office 16 October 2002 – 20 June 2005
- President: Amadou Toumani Touré
- Prime Minister: Ahmed Mohamed ag Hamani; Ousmane Issoufi Maïga

Personal details
- Born: 29 May 1957 Koutiala, French Sudan (present-day Mali)
- Died: 31 May 2024 (aged 67)
- Education: École Normale Supérieure of Bamako; Tulane University

Berthé Aïssata Bengaly (20 May 1957 – 31 May 2024) was a Malian politician and nutrition researcher. She served as minister for the promotion of women, children, and the family from 2002 to 2005, and as minister of the craft industry and tourism from 2013 to 2015.

== Biography ==
Berthé Aïssata Bengaly was born in Koutiala, Mali, in 1957. After getting her bachelor's degree from the Lycée Notre-Dame du Niger in 1978, she graduated with a master's in chemistry from the École Normale Supérieure of Bamako in 1985. She later studied at Tulane University in the United States, where she obtained a master's in nutrition in 1995.

From 1985 to 1986, Bengaly taught chemistry at the Lycée Notre-Dame du Niger in Bamako. She then worked as a researcher at the Institut d'Economie Rurale in Bamako from 1990 to 1995 and at Texas A&M University in the U.S. from 1996 to 2001. While at the Bamako institute, she notably developed Deliken, a sorghum-based nutritional biscuit, among other food products and techniques.

Under the presidency of Amadou Toumani Touré, she was appointed minister for the promotion of women, children, and the family from 16 October 2002, to 20 June 2005. She later served under President Ibrahim Boubacar Keïta as minister of the craft industry and tourism, from 8 September 2013, to 10 January 2015. At one point a member of the Union for Democracy and Development party, she served on its executive committee and headed its women's wing. She was also a onetime member of the Rally for Mali party.

Bengaly was named a Knight of the National Order of Merit for her contributions. She died in 2024, after a short illness, at age 67.
