= Touchwood, Solihull =

Shopping centre in West Midlands, England

Coordinates: 52.413°N 1.780°W

Touchwood
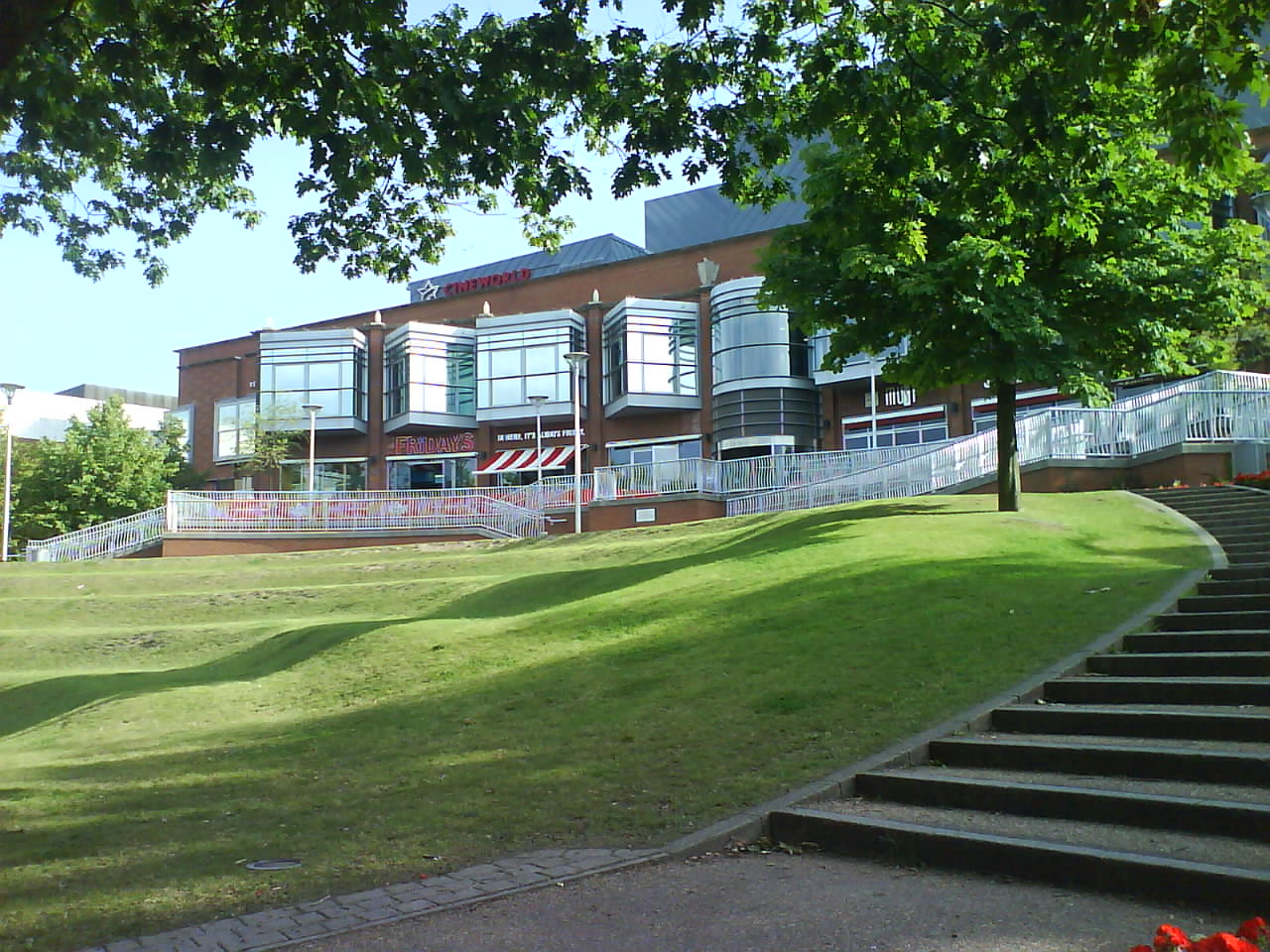
- Jubilee Gardens entrance to restaurants and mall
- Location: Solihull, England
- Opened: 5 September 2001
- Developer: Lendlease
- Manager: Tony Elvin
- Architect: Eric Kuhne
- Num. of stores: 104
- Num. of anchor tenants: 1 (John Lewis)
- Floor area: 650,000 sq ft (60,000 m2)
- Floors: 2 (John Lewis 4 floors)
- Parking: 1,650
- Website: www.touchwoodsolihull.co.uk

Touchwood is a shopping centre in Solihull, West Midlands, England.

== History ==
Designed by Eric Kuhne, Touchwood was developed by Lendlease on the former car parks behind the High Street opening on 5 September 2001.

Around 251,000 cubic metres of earth were excavated to form the basements and over 4,000 tons support the Touchwood structure.

Touchwood has a John Lewis department store, at 265,000 sq ft (24,600 m^{2}), as well as 80 other stores, over 20 restaurants and a Cineworld nine-screen multiplex cinema.

The most successful retailing area of Solihull, Mell Square and Solihull High Street both now hosting empty units. The Touchwood access also leads to Library Square, for the Solihull Central Library and Arts Complex.

In May 2021 Touchwood was sold to Ardent.
