= École Normale Supérieure of Bamako =

School in Bamako, Mali

École Normale Supérieure (ENSUP; alternate, National Superior School of Mali) is a public school of higher education in Bamako, Mali.

== Notable alumni ==
- Berthé Aïssata Bengaly, Malian politician
- Mamadou Diawara, ethnologist
- Tiébilé Dramé, Malian politician
- Alpha Oumar Konaré, President of Mali
- Moussa Konaté, Malian writer
- Assane Kouyaté, Malian film director
- Yeah Samaké, candidate in the 2012 Malian presidential election
- Téréba Togola, Malian archaeologist
- Dandara Touré, Malian politician
