= Assane Kouyaté =

Malian film director

- Born: 1954; Bamako, Mali
- Education: Ecole Normale Supérieure of Bamako; Moscow Institute of Cinema and Television
- Occupation: Film director

Assane Kouyaté (born 1954) is a Malian film director.

== Biography ==
Assane Kouyaté was born in Bamako in 1954. In 1976 he got his degree in arts from the Ecole Normale Supérieure of Bamako, then went to the Moscow Institute of Cinema and Television, where he got his Diploma of Study of Cinema in 1989.

In 1988, he worked with Russian director Sergei Salaviov as an assistant on the movie Pigeon. He has collaborated with many directors worldwide, such as the Argentine Pablo César (Aphrodite, 1998).

In 2002, he produced his first full-length film of his own: Kabala, which tells the story of a Mandé village whose well dries up. Kabala won both the award for best screenplay and the Special Jury Prize at the pan-African Festival of Cinema and Television at Ouagadougou.

== Filmography ==
- Kabala (2002)
