= Ahmed al-Tilemsi =

Malian terrorist and commander

- Native name: عبد الرحمن ولد العامر
- Birth name: Abderrahmane Ould El Amar
- Born: Between 1977 and 1982; Tabankort, Gao Region, Mali
- Died: December 10–11, 2014; Tabankort, Mali
- Allegiance: Mali (until 2012); MOJWA (2012 –2013) al-Mourabitoun (2013–2014)
- Rank: Military commander of Katiba Osama bin Laden (MOJWA); Senior member and financier (al-Mourabitoun); Emir (al-Mourabitoun) (per France)
- Battles / wars: Mali War Battle of Tabankort: Raid on Tabankort †

Ahmed al-Tilemsi, nom de guerre of Abderrahmane Ould El Amar (Arabic: عبد الرحمن ولد العامر) was a Malian jihadist leader and drug trafficker who served as a founding member and senior figure of the Movement for Oneness and Jihad in West Africa (MUJAO) and a senior figure and alleged emir of al-Mourabitoun.

== Biography ==
Most accounts of Tilemsi's life contradict each other. He was originally born to a Lemhar Arab family in the Tilemsi desert in Tabankort, Gao Region, Mali between 1977 and 1982. AFP states that Tilemsi was radicalized at a very young age, and preached from camp to camp. Tilemsi was arrested in Nouakchott, Mauritania in April 2005, but escaped on April 26, 2006. He was arrested again in Mali in 2008, but was released in April 2009. However, Mauritanian journalist Lemine Ould Mohamed Salem states that Tilemsi was not actively a jihadist before the start of the Mali War in 2012. Tilemsi was instead one of the largest drug traffickers in Mali prior to 2012, and part of a pro-government militia close to Malian colonels Mohamed Abderrahmane Ould Meydou and El Hadj Ag Gamou.

Salem reports that Tilemsi joined MOJWA in 2012, when Gao fell to the rebels during the Tuareg rebellion. He joined the movement to protect his drug trafficking business and to settle a long-standing dispute between his clan of Lemhar Arabs (which was close to MOJWA) and the Kunta tribe, which were closer to the National Movement for the Liberation of Azawad. The French army presented Tilemsi as one of the founders of MOJWA.

Tilemsi became the chief of staff of MOJWA according to Jeune Afrique, but was also referred to as the head of Katiba Osama Bin Laden, one of the four katibas in MOJWA. Salem reported that Tilemsi was not the emir or military commander of MOJWA, instead being a financier of the group and later Al-Mourabitoun. Yoro Ould Daha, a former MOJWA spokesperson who defected to the Arab Movement of Azawad, stated that Tilemsi was injured at the beginning of the rebellion in 2012, and recants serving under Tilemsi's orders in Katiba Osama Bin Laden. Daha stated "Ahmed al-Tilemsi scared us. We have known him since the war against the Kuntas; before 2000, he stole our weapons to give to Belmokhtar. He reappeared with him in 2012. He is a real terrorist."

In November 2012, Tilemsi and Sultan Ould Bady participated in the kidnapping of French tourist Gilberto Rodrigues Leal, whose death was announced in 2014. French authorities also suspected Tilemsi of being involved in the kidnappings of Antoine de Leocour and Vincent Delory, both of whom were killed on January 8, 2011 during the Battle of Tabankort. Tilemsi was present at the August 22, 2013 announcement with Mokhtar Belmokhtar in which the two men announced the merging between MOJWA and Blood Signatories to form al-Mourabitoun.

A five million dollar bounty was put on Tilemsi in July 2014 by the United States. He was killed on the night between December 10 and 11, 2014 in a raid by French forces near Tabankort. Al-Mourabitoun confirmed his death on January 6, 2015.
