= Dandara (given name) =

Dandara is a feminine given name. Notable people with the given name include:

- Dandara dos Palmares (1654–1694), Afro-Brazilian warrior
- Dandara dos Santos (died 2017), Brazilian murder victim
- Dandara Tonantzin, Brazilian teacher, activist, and politician
- Dandara Touré, Malian politician
