= Mamadou Diawara (ethnologist) =

German ethnologist

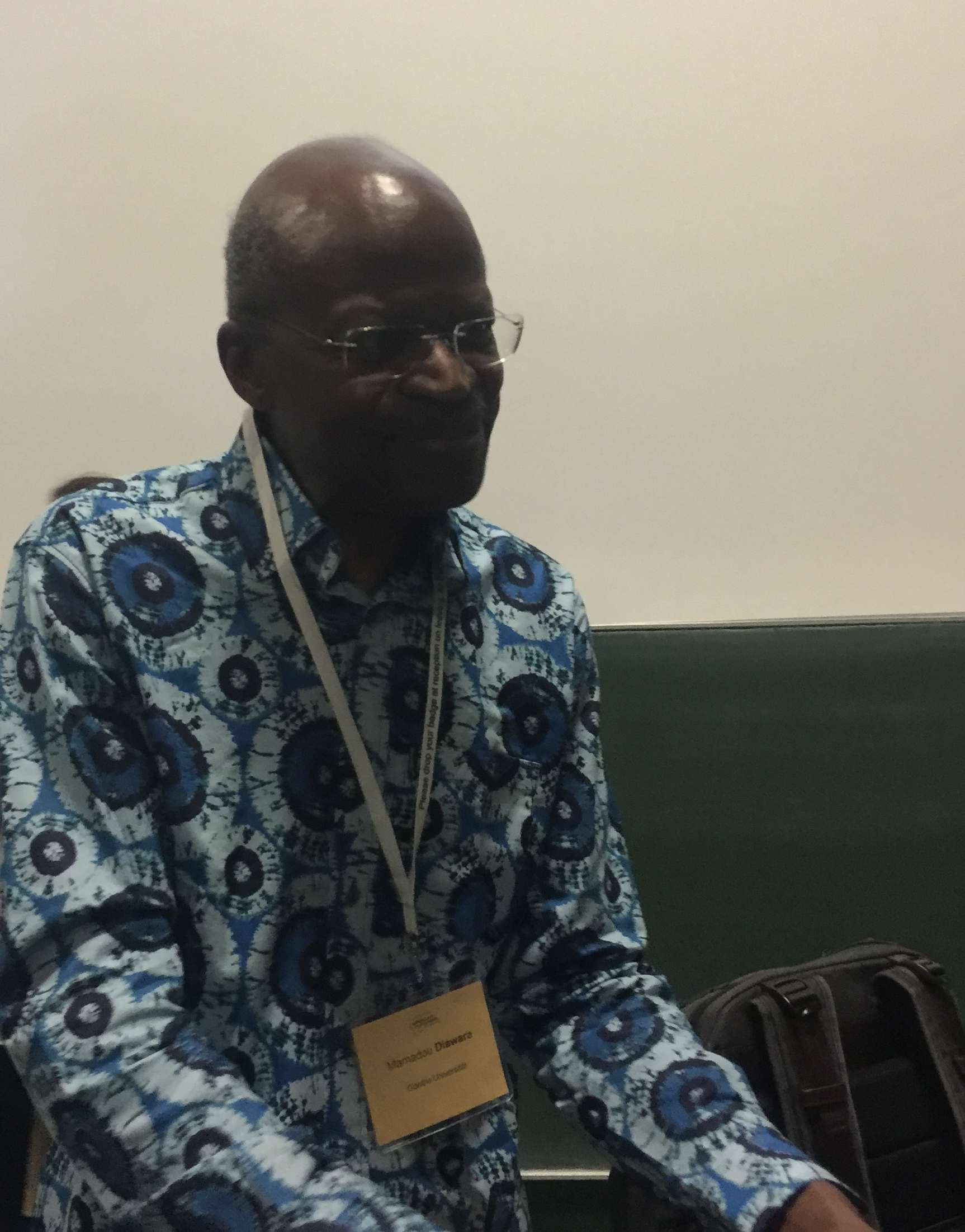
- Mamadou Diawara (2023)
- Born: 1954 (age 71–72); Nioro du Sahel, Mali
- Title: Prof. Dr.

Academic background
- Education: École Normale Supérieure of Bamako, Mali; École des Hautes Études en Sciences Sociales (EHESS), Paris
- Thesis: (1985)

Academic work
- Discipline: Ethnology; African studies; Area studies
- Institutions: Goethe University Frankfurt; Frobenius-Institut, Frankfurt am Main; Point Sud, Bamako, Mali
- Website: website of Prof. Dr. Mamadou Diawara

Mamadou Diawara (born 1954 in Nioro du Sahel, Mali) is an ethnologist of Malian origin. He is a professor for ethnology at the institute for ethnology at the Goethe University Frankfurt and deputy director of the Frobenius Institute in Frankfurt. He is also Director of Point Sud, a Research Center for Local Knowledge in Bamako, Mali.

== Biography ==
=== Professional career ===
Mamadou Diawara studied at the École Normale Supérieure, Bamako, Mali and at the École des hautes études en sciences sociales (EHESS), Paris, where he received his doctorate in 1985 with a thesis in anthropology and history on the topic "La dimension sociale et politique des traditions orales du royaume de Jaara (Mali) du XVe au milieu du XIXe siècle". This was followed by his habilitation at the University of Bayreuth (1998) on the topic "L'empire du verbe. L'eloquence du silence. vers une anthropologie du discours dans les groupes dits dominés au Sahel". Before he was appointed to Frankfurt in 2005, Diawara taught and researched at the University of Fribourg, Miséricorde (Switzerland), the University of Bayreuth, the University of Georgia (US) and at the Karlsruhe University of Arts and Design. He was visiting professor at the University of São Paulo and Salvador da Bahia (Brazil), the École des hautes études en sciences sociales (Paris), Henry Hart Rice Visiting professor in Anthropology and History at Yale University (US) and won the John G. Diefenbaker Award from Université Laval (Canada). He was also a fellow of the Institut d'Études Avancées of Nantes (IEA) France and the Berlin Institute for Advanced Study. In the winter semester 2020/2021 he was a fellow at the "Stellenbosch Institute for Advanced Studies" (STIAS) of the University of Stellenbosch in South Africa.

Mamadou Diawara, together with Stefan Schmid from the Institute for Historical Ethnology at the University of Frankfurt, coordinates a whole series of initiatives that train volunteers and students as well as young scientists. In 1998 he founded, together with colleagues and friends from Germany, Austria and Mali, with funding from the Volkswagen Foundation, a research center for local knowledge in Bamako, Mali, of which he is its director.

=== Research focus ===
His research areas include media, copyright, migration, history, oral traditions and local knowledge in sub-Saharan Africa. He has co-initiated several research funding projects aimed at young scientists from Africa and is involved in programs to promote cooperation between scientists from Africa and the rest of the world.

== Research projects ==
Under the direction of Mamadou Diawara, the 'Point Sud' program, financed by the Deutsche Forschungsgemeinschaft, has been funding humanities and social science events related to Africa since 2008. These are selected by a scientific steering committee through an annual call for proposals. The aim of the program is the exchange and networking of scientists from Germany, Africa and other parts of the world as well as the promotion of young scientists.

Together with de:Elísio Macamo from the University of Basel, Mamadou Diawara founded the "Pilot African Postgraduate Academy" (PAPA). The project, funded by the de:Gerda Henkel Foundation, is aimed at young scientists who have recently completed their doctoral thesis and are working at universities in Africa. The aim is to deepen their understanding of the value of science for its own sake and to encourage their interest in conceptual basic research.

In cooperation with four partner institutions, Mamadou Diawara also heads the international research college Maria Sibylla Merian Institute for Advanced Studies in Africa (MIASA) at the University of Ghana in Legon, Accra. The institute, financed with funds from the Federal Ministry of Education and Research, is committed to reducing global asymmetries in knowledge production and to greater cooperation between researchers from Anglophone and Francophone Africa.

From 2007 to 2019, Diawara was Principal Investigator of the Exzellenzcluster 243 "Excellence Cluster Normative Orders. The Formation of Normative Orders" at the Goethe University. From 2013 to 2019 he was also a member of AFRASO, an interdisciplinary and transregional joint project at the Goethe University Frankfurt, which examines the new relationships between the two continents of Africa and Asia from a comparative and transregional perspective.

He conducted ethnographic field research in Mali, France, Mauritania, Indonesia and Thailand. Mamadou Diawara is editor and author of numerous publications on copyright, migration, oral tradition and local knowledge in Sub-Saharan Africa. His current research interests are in particular the issues of local media and western media in the context of orality.

== Awards ==
- In 2022 Diawara was elected Corresponding Member of the British Academy.
- John G. Diefenbaker Award from Université Laval (Canada).

== Publications (selection) ==
=== Monographs (selection) ===
- "L'empire du verbe et l'éloquence du silence. Vers une anthropologie du discours dans les groupes dits dominés au Sahel". Köln: Rüdiger Köppe, 2003
- "La graine de la parole". Stuttgart: Steiner Verlag, 1990

=== Edited publications (selection) ===
- "Der Blick Afrikas auf Europa". In: Michael Hohmann, Pierre Monne (eds.): Café Europa: Vorträge und Debatten zur Identität Europas. Wallstein; 1. Edition (30 November 2022), pp. 161–172. ISBN 3835352512
- "Seeing like scholars. Whose exile? Making a life, at home and abroad". In: Ross Anthony and Uta Ruppert (eds.) Reconfiguring Transregionalisation in the Global South. African-Asian Encounters, Palgrave Macmillan, 2020: 197–222.
- "Normes étatiques et pratiques locales en Afrique subsaharienne : entre affrontement et accommodement". Paris: Éditions Manucius 2019, ed. with Ute Röschenthaler.
- Translation revisited: contesting the sense of African social realities, Cambridge: Cambridge Scholars Publishing 2018, ed. with Jean-Bernard Ouédraogo und Elísio S Macamo.
- "Copyright Africa: How Intellectual Property, Media and Markets Transform Immaterial Cultural Goods". Canon Pyon: Sean Kingston Publishing 2016, ed. with Ute Röschenthaler.
- Heinrich Barth et l'Afrique. Köln: Rüdiger Köppe, 2006, ed. with Paulo Fernando de Moraes Farias and Gerd Spittler.
- "Colonial Appropriation of Local Knowledge". In: Peter Probst und Gerd Spittler (ed.), Between Resistance and Expansion. Explorations of local Vitality in Africa. Münster: LIT, Rochester: Transactions Publishers 2004, 273 293.

=== Articles (selection) ===
- "Die Jagd nach den Piraten. Zur Herausbildung von Urheberrechten im Kontext der Oralität im subsaharischen Afrika". Sociologus 61 (1) (2011): 69 89
- "Development and administrative norms: The Office du Niger and decentralization in French Sudan". Africa, 81 (3) (2011): 434 454.
- "Dieu d'eau, eau du barrage. Les populations du plateau dogon face aux contraintes: pluviométrie, terre et démographie". Africa 67 (4) (1997): 602 624.
- "La bibliothèque coloniale, la propriété intellectuelle et la romance du développement en Afrique". Canadian Journal of African Studies, 48 (3) (2014): 445 461.
