= Moussa Konaté (writer) =

Malian writer (1951–2013)

- Born: 1951; Kita, Mali
- Died: 30 November 2013 (aged 61–62); Limoges, France
- Education: Ecole Normale Supérieure of Bamako

Moussa Konaté (1951 – 30 November 2013) was a Malian writer who was born in Kita. He died in Limoges on 30 November 2013.

== Biography ==
A graduate in Humanities at Mali's Ecole Normale Supérieure of Bamako, he was a teacher for several years before turning to writing. He is the founder of Editions Le Figuier (Prickly Pear Publishing) and the director of the Association Etonnants voyageurs Afrique (Amazing Travellers Africa Association) and, along with Michel Le Bris, was the Mali manager of the Festival Etonnants voyageurs, an international book fair in Saint-Malo.

== Publications ==
=== Novels ===
- L'Empreinte du renard, Fayard, 2006.
- L’assassin du Banconi, suivi de L’Honneur des Keita, Editions Gallimard, Paris, 2002.
- Goorgi, Editions Le Figuier, Bamako, Mali, 1998.
- Les Saisons, Editions Samana, Bamako, Mali, 1990.
- Fils du chaos, L’Harmattan, Paris, 1986.
- Une Aube incertaine, Présence Africaine, Paris, 1985.
- Le Prix de l’âme, Présence Africaine, Paris, 1981.

=== Stories ===
- Sitan, la petite imprudente, Editions Le Figuier, Bamako, Mali, 1997.
- Barou et sa méchante marâtre, Editions Le Figuier, Bamako, Mali, 1997.
- L’Hyene et le Malin Fafa, Editions Le Figuier, Bamako, Mali, 1997.
- Les Trois gourmands, Editions Le Figuier, Bamako, Mali, 1997.

=== Youth topics ===
- La Savonnière, Editions Le Figuier, Bamako, Mali, 2003.
- La Potière, Editions Le Figuier, Bamako, Mali, 2003.
- La Fileuse, Editions Le Figuier, Bamako, Mali, 2003.

=== Social, politics ===
- Mali–Ils ont assassiné l’espoir, essai, L’Harmattan, Paris, 1985.
- Chronique d’une journée de répression, L’Harmattan, Paris, 1988.
- Le casier judiciaire, nouvelle publiée dans le recueil La Voiture est dans la piroge publié par les Editions Le Bruit des Autres.

=== Plays ===
- Khasso, (2004)
- Un Appel de nuit (1995)
- Un Monde immobile (1994)
- L’Or du diable (1985)
- Le Cercle au féminin (1985)
- Le dernier pas

=== Films ===
- Un Mali d'écrivains 2001. Films du Horla (Les)/France 3 Production Lille
