= Popular Movement for the Salvation of Azawad =

Armed group active in northern Mali

- Mouvement populaire pour le salut de l'Azawad
- Flag of the MPSA
- Founder: Boubacar Sadegh Ould Taleb
- Spokesperson: Alhousseyne Ag Issa
- Founded: August 26, 2014
- Split from: Arab Movement of Azawad
- Country: Mali
- Active regions: Northern Mali
- Ideology: Azawadi autonomy
- Size: 300 (2015)
- Part of: Coordination of Entente Movements

The Popular Movement for the Salvation of Azawad (Mouvement populaire pour le salut de l'Azawad) or MPSA is an armed group active in northern Mali. It was founded on August 26, 2014, following a split from the Arab Movement of Azawad.

== History and objectives ==
The MPSA was founded on August 26, 2014, during talks between the Malian government and Tuareg armed groups leading up to the Algiers Accords. The MPSA was accepted into negotiations during the second round of talks. The MPSA claims to abide by Malian law, and presents itself as a political group instead of an armed group. The MPSA also states that it does not seek independence for Azawad, although it does want autonomy within Mali. Boubacar Sidi Ali, the founder, stated he formed the MPSA to distance from Al-Qaeda in the Islamic Maghreb. According to a July 2015 Jeune Afrique report, the MPSA has 300 fighters. The movement largely consists of Arabs from the Timbuktu area and some Tuaregs.

On November 11, 2017, the MPSA joined several other groups to found the Coordination of Entente Movements. These included the Movement for the Salvation of Azawad, Coalition of the People of Azawad, the Congress for Justice in Azawad, and the Popular Front of Azawad.

== Organization ==
On the day of its creation, the MPSA announced its cabinet. Boubacar Sedigh Ould Taleb was the secretary-general, and Alhousseyne Ag Issa was the spokesperson.
