= Coordination of Inclusivity Movements =

Malian armed group alliance

- Coordination des mouvements de l'inclusivité
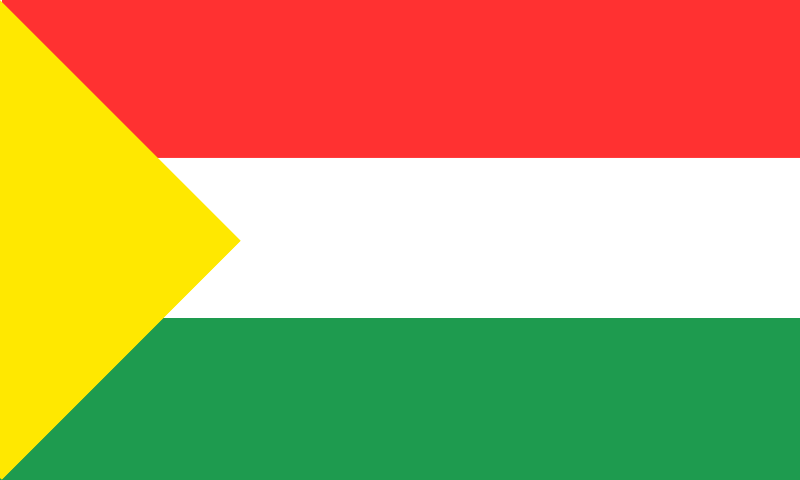
- Flag of the CMI
- Leader: Abou Bakr Siddigh Ould Taleb
- Dates active: 2017–present
- Wars: Mali War

The Coordination of Inclusivity Movements (French: Coordination des mouvements de l'inclusivité, CMI) is an alliance of five armed groups during the Mali War. The group was originally founded as the Coordination of Entente Movements (CME) in 2017 but changed to the CMI in 2020.

== History ==
The CME was founded on November 11, 2017, by dissident groups of the Coordination of Azawad Movements (CMA) and Platform alliances. Groups in the CME demanded adherence to the Algiers Accords of 2015. The five main groups present at the foundation of the CME were:

- Movement for the Salvation of Azawad - Chamanamas (MSA-C) (expelled in 2023 due to its affiliation with the CSP-PSD)
- Coalition of the People of Azawad (CPA)
- Congress for Justice in Azawad (CJA)
- Popular Front of Azawad (FPA)
- Popular Movement for the Salvation of Azawad (MPSA)

Between April 30 and August 3, 2018, Alla Ag Medi from MSA-C was appointed as the movement's interim general-secretary for three months during the first congress of the CMA held in Tin Aouker, Gao Region. Abou Bakr Siddigh Ould Taleb from the MPSA succeeded Medi as general-secretary in August 2018.

The CME is not explicitly pro-government or pro-autonomy like Platform and the CMA respectively, but instead advocates for the recognition and inclusion of its member groups and the ethno-religious groups comprising them within the Malian peace process.
