= 2013 Tessalit attack =

2013 battle of the Mali War

Date	October 23, 2013
Location	Tessalit, Mali
Result	Chadian victory

Belligerents
MINUSMA: Chad; France	Katibat Salahadin

Casualties and losses
2 killed 6 injured	5 killed
- 1 civilian killed 3 civilians injured

On October 23, 2013, Katiba Salahadin militants attacked Chadian peacekeepers in the city of Tessalit, sparking a battle between the militants and Chadian and French forces. The attack was the first attack by jihadists targeting MINUSMA peacekeepers during the Mali War.

== Background ==
Tessalit, in northern Kidal Region, was the site of the second battle of the Mali War, when moderate Tuareg forces of the National Movement for the Liberation of Azawad (MNLA) and jihadist fighters from Ansar Dine besieged Malian troops at the Amachach base in Tessalit, and captured the city after two months. Following the Malian counteroffensive in 2013, Chadian peacekeepers from MINUSMA and French forces of Operation Serval were stationed in the city.

== Attack ==
Around 9:40am on October 23, a VBIED driven by suicide bombers targeted Chadian peacekeepers at a roadblock in front of the headquarters of Tessalit Cercle in Tessalit. Shortly afterward, three other suicide bombers between the ages of 17 and 30 equipped with vests carrying Chinese 60mm mortar shells and AKMs rifles ran towards the peacekeepers. Two of the suicide bombers were shot dead before they could reach the peacekeepers, but the third one managed to blow himself up. This suicide bomber caused the deaths of two Chadian soldiers.

Other jihadists then began swarming positions of the Chadian army. One group first shot light weapons in the early afternoon, and a second group shot rockets at Chadian forces from a position seven kilometers from the city. French forces in the city helped Chadian forces with engineering and medical elements. Jihadist forces withdrew from Tessalit in the early afternoon.

== Aftermath ==
The attack was claimed the same day by Sultan Ould Bady, commander and founder of Katibat Salahadin. His katiba was a brigade in MOJWA, but had recently defected to Ansar Dine. Around the time of the attack, Bady's katiba was assumed to be operating largely on its own.

A UN spokesman stated two Chadian soldiers were killed in the attack, and six others were injured. The Chadian government and Malian Minister of Defense both confirmed this assessment. In the same statement, the UN stated a civilian was killed in the attack, with the Malian defense minister clarifying a child was killed. Three civilians, including a child, were injured as well.

A Malian military officer stated four suicide bombers were killed, and the Chadian Army revised this number to five killed.
