= Cockle Bay (Sydney) =

Bay in Sydney, New South Wales

Coordinates: 33°52′18″S 151°12′03″E

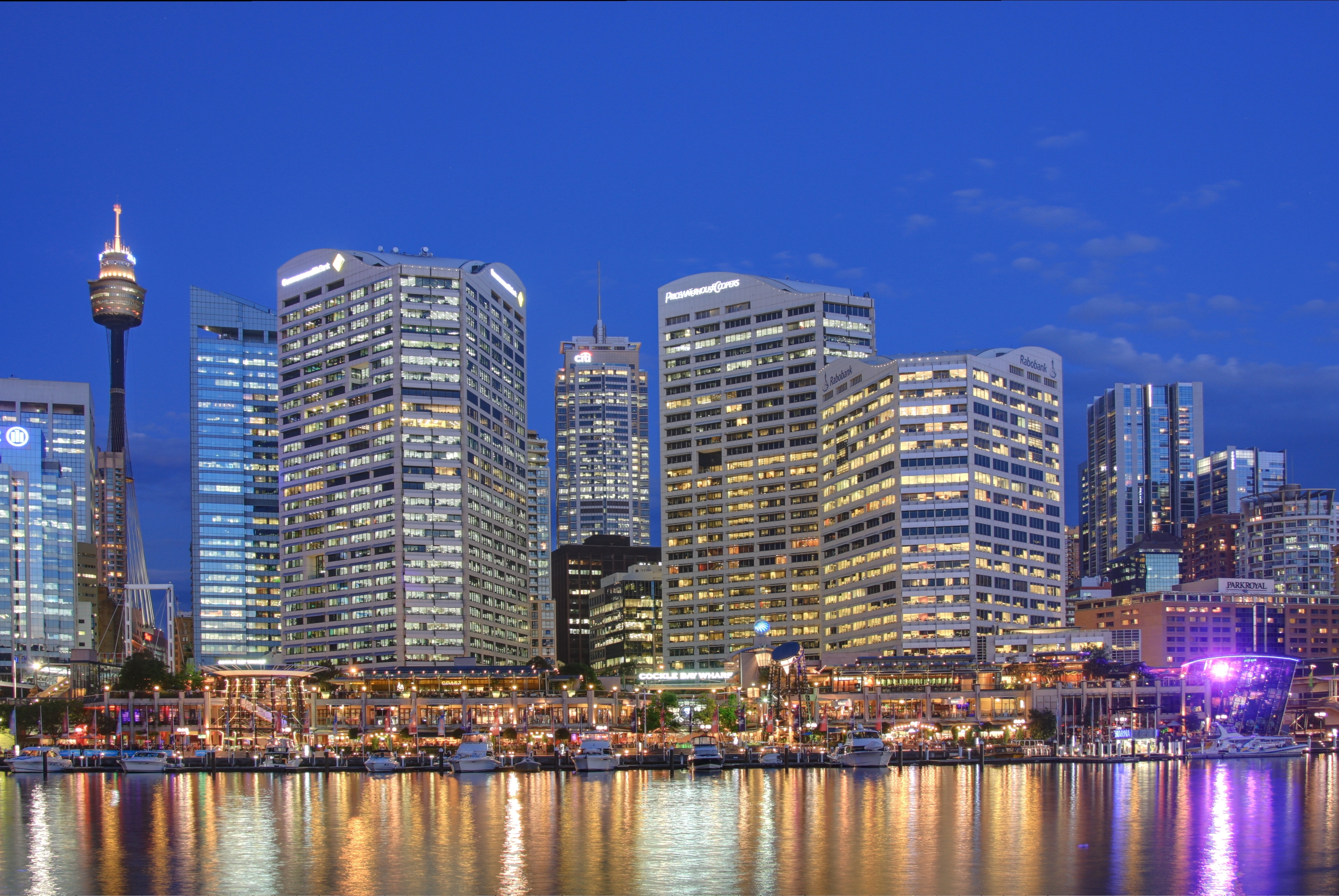
Cockle Bay Wharf

Cockle Bay is a small bay in inner-city Sydney, New South Wales, Australia. It is located on the western edge of the Sydney central business district.

Cockle Bay is one of the bays in Darling Harbour, which opens into the much larger Sydney Harbour. The locality around the bay is also known as Darling Harbour. The bay is primarily known for Cockle Bay Wharf, a waterfront entertainment area designed by Eric Kuhne that includes a wide variety of restaurants, pubs, clubs, cafes and function venues.

== History ==
When the First Fleet reached Sydney Cove in January 1788, the convict transport Scarborough also carried 5,000 bricks and 12 wooden moulds for making bricks. This token consignment sufficed for the first settlers to make a start on the colony's first buildings, until they could find a suitable site for brick-making. Brick-making required a plentiful supply of clay and a ready source of fresh water. Approximately a mile from the settlement, at the head of a long cove (and consequently so named), a suitable site for brick-making was located. This site was later named Cockle Bay, and still later, Darling Harbour.

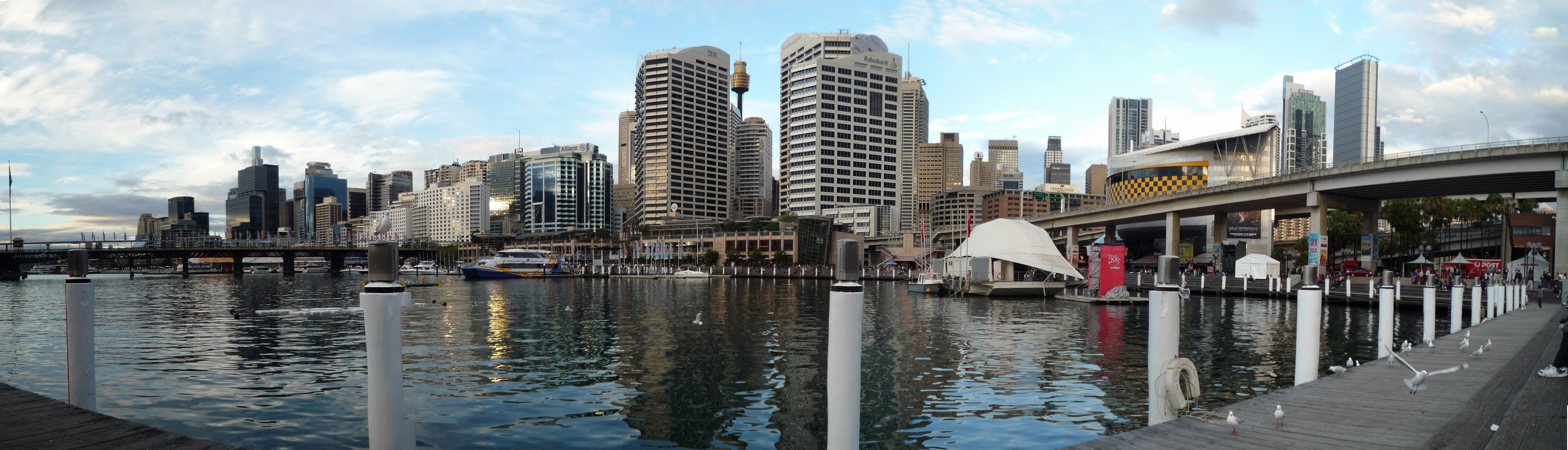
Cockle Bay and Sydney CBD skyline, June 2009
