= Coalition of the People of Azawad =

Political and military party in Mali

- Leaders: Ibrahim Ag Mohamed Assaleh (2014-2015); Mohamed Ousmane Ag Mohamedoun (2015-present)
- Dates active: March 18, 2014 - present
- Ideology: Tuareg autonomy
- Part of: Coordination of Entente Movements
- Wars: Mali War

The Coalition of the People of Azawad, also translated as the Coalition for the People of Azawad (CPA) is a Tuareg political and military movement formed in 2014 during the Mali War.

== History ==
The CPA was founded by Ibrahim Ag Mohamed Assaleh, the former external affairs representative of the National Movement for the Liberation of Azawad (MNLA). Assaleh created the group on March 18, 2014, in the village of Hassi Labyad north of Timbuktu, in a ceremony with 700 people in attendance, although Assaleh was not there. In the statement released during the formation of the group, the CPA consists of 32 members, mostly Tuareg, although the group claims to preside over Songhai, Fulani, and Arab communities. The statement also claimed that the CPA had 8,000 fighters, but this was likely exaggerated.

The CPA was created after a fallout between Assaleh and the head of the MNLA, Bilal Ag Acherif, over negotiations with the Malian government. Assaleh also disputed with Acherif over the latter's preference to Morocco mediating Malian-Tuareg negotiations. Assaleh preferred the Algerian government's role in the Mali War. In the summer of 2014, the CPA joined the Coordination of Azawad Movements (CMA). During negotiations with the Malian government in what would come to be the Algiers Agreement, Assaleh advocated for an Iraqi Kurdistan-style autonomy for the Azawad area.

On May 21, 2015, Assaleh was expelled from the CPA. In a press release, the CPA stated Assaleh was expelled for not adhering to the Algiers Agreement, which the CPA signed. Mohamed Ousmane Ag Mohamedoun became the subsequent leader of the movement. Shortly after his installment, his two children were kidnapped by unknown assailants.

Between July 30 and August 1, 2016, Assaleh and Mohamedoun met in Soumpi with other members of the CPA. Following an internal election, Mohamedoun became secretary-general of the CPA. That November, Assaleh claimed that the Coalition of the People of Azawad had been dissolved. This was contested by Mohamedoun, who stated that Assaleh no longer represented the movement. That year, the CPA claimed it had 1,700 fighters. A MINUSMA report stated the group had 500.

In November 2017, the CPA, along with the Movement for the Salvation of Azawad and three other Tuareg movements, founded the Coordination of Entente Movements.

=== Soumpi attack ===
A UN report from August 8, 2018 accused Alkassoum Ag Abdoulaye, the chief of staff of the CPA, of participating in a jihadist attack in Soumpi alongside Jama'at Nasr al-Islam wal Muslimin to gain weapons and ammo. Mohamedoun was also accused of having "very actively contributed to delaying the implementation of peace and reconciliation in Timbuktu and Gao regions." The United Nations Security Council implemented sanctions on him that December, banning him from travelling outside Mali for breaking the Algiers Agreement.
