= Tissalaten =

Archaeological site in Niafunké Cercle, Mali

- Location in Mali
- Coordinates: 15°54′0″N 4°21′30″W
- Country: Mali
- Region: Tombouctou
- Cercle: Niafunké
- Time zone: UTC+0 (GMT)

Tissalaten is an archaeological site in Niafunké Cercle, Timbuktu Region, Mali, not far from Lake Soumpi. It was excavated extensively in the 1980s by Téréba Togola, Michael Rainbault and Roderick and Susan McIntosh. They discovered tumuli here in 1986 dated to 1030–1220 AD.
