= 2014 Tabankort raid =

2014 French forces ambush of al-Mourabitoun around Gao Region, Mali

Raid on Tabankort
- Part of Mali War
Date	December 10–11, 2014
Location	near Tabankort, Gao Region, Mali
Result	French victory

Belligerents
France	al-Mourabitoun

Commanders and leaders
Unknown	Ahmed al-Tilemsi †

Casualties and losses
None	7 killed 3 captured

Between December 10 and 11, 2014, French forces ambushed militants from al-Mourabitoun near Tabankort, Gao Region, Mali. The ambush led to the death of Ahmed al-Tilemsi, the founder of MOJWA and a key figure in al-Mourabitoun.

== Ambush ==
Following "opportunity intelligence" received by the French army, French forces conducted an operation against a group of jihadists suspected to be active in the locality of Tabankort. The Malian Ministry of Defense stated that French and Malian forces were carrying out a joint operation in the area, but France claimed that Malian forces did not participate; only intelligence and local authorities. The raid began at dawn, with French special forces ambushing a camp where around fifteen jihadists were gathered. The jihadists tried to fight back, but all were subdued.

== Aftermath ==
The Malian Ministry of Defense stated ten jihadists were killed or captured in the raid, with a follow-up statement detailing seven killed and three captured. Among the dead was Ahmed al-Tilemsi, the emir of MOJWA and a senior figure in al-Mourabitoun. The French did not report any losses.

Al-Mourabitoun confirmed Tilemsi's death along with six other fighters in a message given to Mauritanian news agency Alakhbar on January 6, 2015.
