= Soumpi attack =

- Part of Mali War
| Date | January 27, 2018 |
| Location | Soumpi, Mali |
| Result | JNIM-CPA victory |

Belligerents
| Mali | Jama'at Nasr al-Islam wal Muslimin; Coalition of the People of Azawad |

Commanders and leaders
| Abass Dembélé; Daoud Ould Mohammedine | Alkassoum Ag Abdoulaye |

Strength
| Unknown | ~30 |

Casualties and losses
| 14 killed 18 injured | 4 killed |

On January 27, 2018, militants from Jama'at Nasr al-Islam wal Muslimin and the Coalition of the People of Azawad attacked a Malian military base in Soumpi, Mali.

== Background ==
Jama'at Nasr al-Islam wal Muslimin formed in 2017 as a coalition of five different jihadist groups which had been fighting the Malian government since the outbreak of the Mali War in 2012. Occasionally, the group worked with Tuareg rebel groups which originally rebelled against the Malian government but distanced themselves from the jihadists since.

== Attack ==
The Soumpi military camp was attacked on the morning of January 27, around 4am local time. At the time of the attack, the base was guarded by gendarmes, national guard forces and Malian soldiers. Around 30 jihadists participated in the attack, firing rockets at the camp before assaulting it with automatic weapons. After an hour and a half of fighting, Malian soldiers fled the camp. The jihadists pillaged the base before retreating towards Mauritania around 8am.

== Aftermath ==
An anonymous source in the Malian military told Reuters that fourteen Malian soldiers were killed and seventeen were injured. Two jihadists were killed as well, according to the source. This was later corroborated by the Malian army, which released a statement stating fourteen soldiers were killed and eighteen were injured.

JNIM claimed responsibility for the attack on January 29, alleging to have captured six vehicles and losing four soldiers. Two Arabs, a Fulani, and a Tuareg were killed within their ranks, according to the group.

A United Nations report from August 8, 2018, accused Alkassoum Ag Abdoulaye, the chief of staff for the Tuareg militant group Coalition of the People of Azawad, in participating in planning and executing the attack in collaboration with JNIM. The report stated the CPA's goals were opportunistic, aiming to seize weapons and ammunition.
