= Eric Kuhne =

American-born British architect

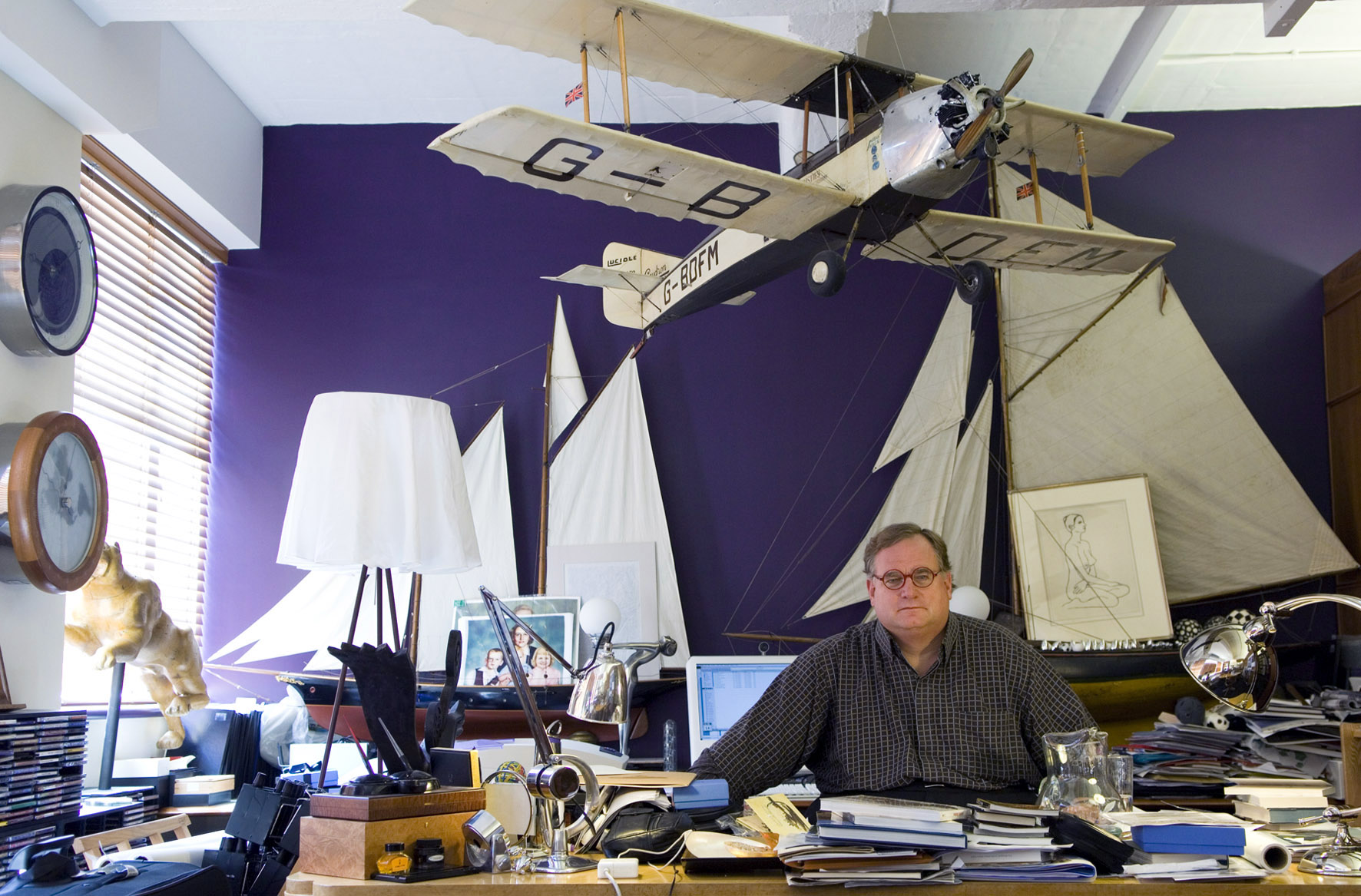
- Eric Kuhne in April 2007
- Born: September 2, 1951; San Antonio, Texas
- Died: July 25, 2016 (aged 64); London, England
- Citizenship: American-British
- Education: New Haven High School Rice University Princeton University School of Architecture
- Occupation: Architect
- Notable work: Bluewater Shopping Centre; Titanic Belfast

Eric Robert Kuhne (September 2, 1951 – July 25, 2016) was an American-born British architect based in London. With major projects around the world, Kuhne's commissions included the Bluewater Shopping Centre, built within Western Quarry in Kent and completed in 1999, as well as the Titanic Belfast visitor attraction in Northern Ireland, which opened to the public in 2012.

== Life ==
Kuhne was born in San Antonio, Texas of Swiss, Czech, and Swedish heritage and grew up in the Air Force as a son to Major Robert David Kuhne and Thelma Parsons Kuhne. He moved with his sister (Dawn Elyse) and brother (Wes Parsons) from one Air Force base to another, living in San Antonio, Houston, Biloxi, Tampa, Tucson, Chicago and El Paso, before his father retired in 1962. The family then moved to New Haven, Indiana and into civilian life.

During his childhood, his father taught him perspective drawing when he was seven years old. His parents introduced him to architecture and civil engineering through books in their library. His early employment was with a landscape architect in Fort Wayne, Indiana before beginning work as an assistant to Dr Louis G. Petro, a Civil Engineer in Fort Wayne. With Louis G Petro & Associates, between the ages of 14 and 16, he learned drafting, project management, and the fundamentals to both architecture and engineering. He worked for Cole Matson & Matott Architects in Fort Wayne in his final year of high school. Graduating from New Haven High School in 1969, he entered Rice University School of Architecture. There, he completed a Bachelor of Arts Degree with majors in both Art and Architecture in 1973. Returning to Indiana, he began work for Louis Petro, who was then the head of the Fort Wayne Housing Authority, and within three months he was selected as the Midtown Architect for Mayor Ivan Lebamoff in Fort Wayne. During this time, he completed a new master plan for downtown Fort Wayne. In addition, he restored the farmer's market back to West Berry Street, designed the Courtyards Project (then called the "Alley Project") at Wayne and Calhoun Streets, and developed the initial plans for Citilights State Park (eventually to become Headwaters Park).

While in Fort Wayne, Kuhne was also appointed to the Board of the Public Transportation Corporation by Mayor Lebamoff. He was appointed to the Allen County Soil & Water Conservation District by the Governor of the State of Indiana.

Traveling in Europe in 1974 under the William Ward Watkin Traveling Fellowship, awarded from the Rice University School of Architecture in 1973, he traveled throughout Europe. Kuhne left Fort Wayne in 1981 to work for the famed post-modernist architect, Michael Graves in Princeton, New Jersey. In the autumn of 1981 Kuhne entered Princeton's Graduate School of Architecture and graduated in 1983 with a Masters of Architecture degree. For his work there, he won the Henry Adams Medal from the American Institute of Architects.

Kuhne worked and lived in London in Clerkenwell. In December 2009, he became a British citizen and held dual citizenship with the United States.

Kuhne died suddenly in London on July 25, 2016, from a heart attack, aged 64.

== CivicArts ==
=== Foundation ===
Kuhne conceived his later company CivicArts in 1975 and as five divisions of Research (Edgewater Mail & Breeze), Concept Design (Citilights), Professional Architectural Services (Eric R Kuhne & Associates), Industrial Design & Manufacturing (Tesserax Designs), and Investment (Spondulix Development).

While at Princeton, in 1981 he opened Eric R Kuhne & Associates in his apartment on Nassau Street overlooking the entrance to Princeton University. There he hired several colleagues at the School of Architecture and entered design competitions. He won the Columbus Carscape Competition and three Progressive Architecture Design Awards for Courtyards, Headwaters Park, and River Walk.

The office was relocated to New York in 1985 at 50 Walker Street where it remained until 2005 when it was centred in London. All work has been done out of the London office which was opened in 1994.

=== Sydney, Australia ===
In 1990, Kuhne visited his sister's family in Sydney, Australia and gave a talk at the University of Sydney School of Architecture entitled "Civic Vs Public". There he met Malcolm Latham who had just moved from being Director of the National Capital Authority in Canberra to Director of Special Projects at Lendlease. Through Latham, he was introduced to Stuart Hornery, chairman of the Board of Lendlease.

Lendlease engaged Kuhne's office to work on Darling Park, Australia's largest mixed-use waterfront development in Sydney. There many of the advanced ideas of cities and architecture were incubated. Darling Park continues to be one of the most successful waterfront developments in the southern hemisphere. It includes Cockle Bay Wharf and the Waratah Gardens as part of its completed design of 1,200,000 square feet (110,000 m^{2}).

=== Worldwide operations ===
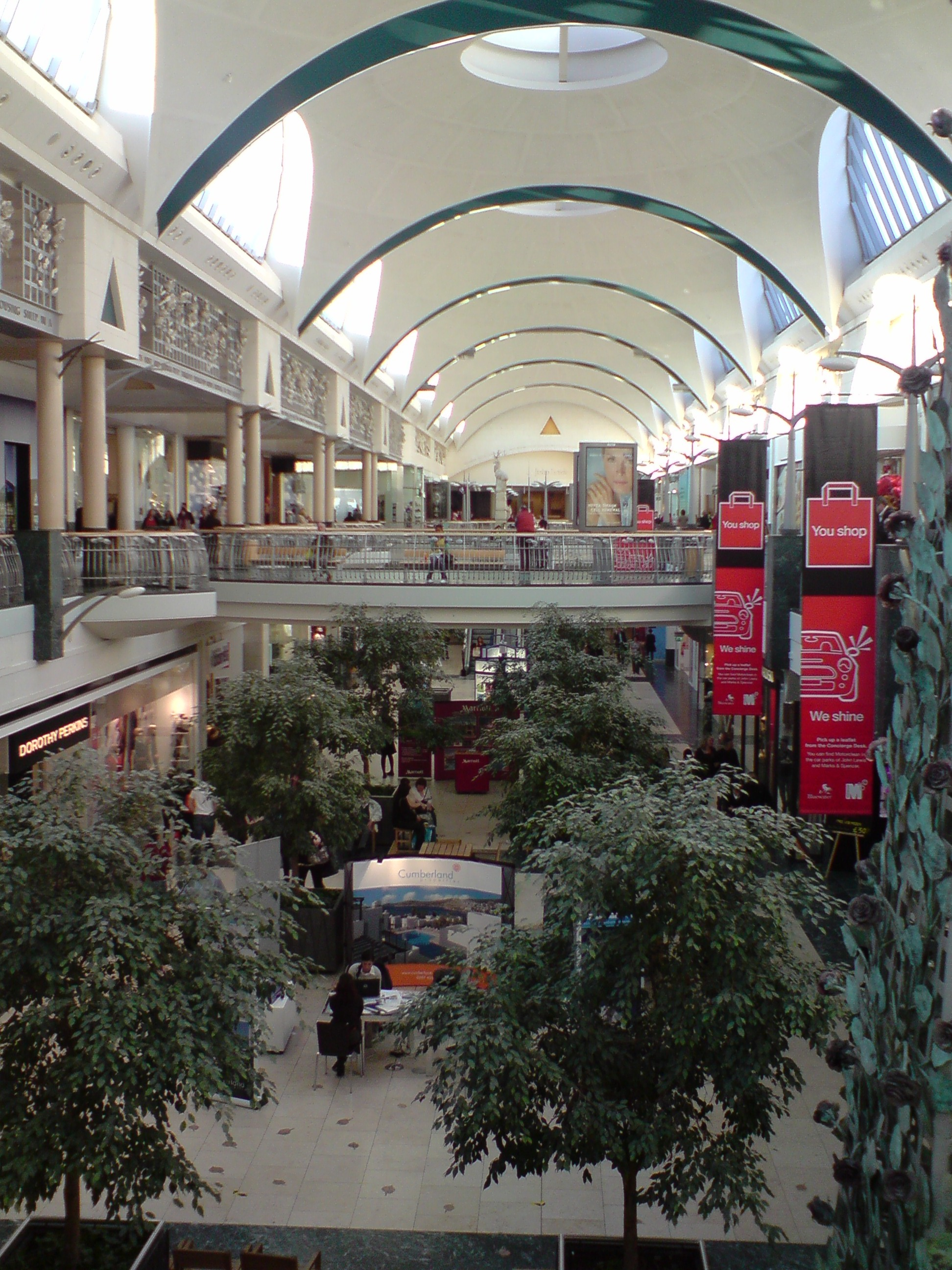
Rose Gallery, Bluewater Mall, Kent

After living in Sydney, Kuhne was asked in 1994 to move to England to take over the design of Bluewater Park, the largest retail/leisure destination in Europe. His office led a design and engineering team for Lendlease to produce Bluewater Shopping Centre as nearly 2,000,000 square feet (190,000 m^{2}) of the finest retail/leisure destination in Europe.

Opening an office in London, Kuhne began expanding the concentration of researchers, designers, and planners in the United Kingdom. With the addition of BurJuman Gardens Shopping Centrer in Dubai in 1999, Kuhne's firm began working globally to create landmark destinations around the world. Kuhne lectured all over the world about his research, using his projects to illustrate advanced ideas in art, architecture, landscape, urban and industrial design. His talks included "Civic Vs Public", "Stillife Vs Wildlife", "The Art of the Gift", "Marketplace of Ideas", "Skyscrapers vs Starcatchers", "Ornamental Cities" and "Five Cities For The Future". These talks all explored restoring the quality of story-telling to architecture, gardens and cities.

== Philosophy ==
His design philosophy, which he labels "Marketplace of Ideas" is to conceive "great" civic spaces that "restore the storytelling quality of architecture." He states, "cities have always been marketplaces for commodities, goods, services and faiths" but that "none of these truly reveres the power of civic life." He argued that retail trade "can bring back the pageantry of civic life to cities and towns."

== Projects ==
Kuhne's notable large scale retail-based projects included Cockle Bay Wharf in Sydney, Australia, the huge Bluewater Shopping Centre in Kent, and the Titanic Quarter redevelopment in Belfast. His other projects include:

1980s

- Courtyards, Fort Wayne, Indiana 1981
- River Walk, Chesapeake, Virginia 1987
- Columbus Carscape, Columbus, Ohio 1987

1990s

- Headwaters Park, Fort Wayne, Indiana 1990
- Darling Park, Sydney, Australia 1991
- Bluewater Shopping Centre, Greenhithe, England 1994
- Cockle Bay Wharf, Sydney Australia 1995
- Touchwood, Solihull, England 1998
- Bur Juman Gardens, Dubai, UAE 1999

2000–2005

- Shell Centre, London, England 2000
- St David's Centre, Cardiff, Wales 2001
- Le Parc Des Collines, Mandelieu, France 2001
- Les Jardins De Poncy, Poissy, France 2001
- Xentury City, Orlando, Florida 2001
- Island Gardens, Miamim Florida 2001
- Eastern Quarry, Kent, England 2001
- Ebbsfleet City, Dartford & Gravesend UK 2002
- Greenwich Peninsula, Greenwich, England 2002
- One New Change, London UK 2002
- New West End, London UK 2003
- Moana Whenua, Auckland Waterfront New Zealand 2002
- Mid Valley Gardens, Kuala Lumpur, Malaysia 2002
- Kurnell Peninsula, Botany Bay, Sydney, Australia 2002
- North Lakes, Queensland, Australia 2003
- Charter Place, Watford UK 2003
- AviaPark (Avia Park), Moscow Russia 2003
- Stratford City, London UK 2003
  - Stratford Town, London UK 2003
  - Stratford Bridge, London UK 2003
- Castle Quay, St Helier Jersey UK 2005
- SuBaceleri (Istanbul Waterfront) Istanbul Turkey 2005
- Titanic Quarter, Belfast Northern Ireland UK 2005
  - Titanic signature project, Belfast Northern Ireland 2006 Opened 2012.
  - Titanic Quarter Lagan Village, Belfast Northern Ireland 2006
- Madinat al-Hareer, Madinat al-Hareer (Arabic: مدينة الحرير, meaning "City of Silk"), Kuwait 2005
  - Burj Mubarak al Kabir (Tower of 1,001 Arabian Nights), Kuwait 2005
- Dubai International Financial Centre, Dubai UAE 2005
- The Mall of Kuwait, Kuwait 2005

2006–present

- Borabay Lakes Resort, Borovoye Lakes Kazakhstan 2006
- Mohammad bin Rashid Gardens Dubai, UAE 2007–08
  - Sheikh Mohammed Bin Rashid Grand Mosque, Dubai UAE 2008
- Incheon Airport Centre, Incheon South Korea 2007
- Arman Centre Arcade, Astana Kasakhstan 2007
- Arena Square, Birmingham UK 2007
- Epicentre, Las Vegas Nevada, 2007
- Manama Lagoon, Bahrain
- Griffintown, Montreal, Quebec, Canada 2008
- Southern Cross Sanctuary, Canberra, Australia 2008
- Al Wadi Gardens, Riyadh 2009
  - Grand Mosque, Al Wadi Gardens, Riyadh, Saudi Arabia 2009
- Barangaroo, Sydney, Australia 2009
- Lakeside, Cairo, Egypt 2010
- Damansara Town Centre, Kuala Lumpur 2010
- Chadstone Vision Plan, Melbourne, Australia 2010
- Midway Gardens, Istanbul, Turkey 2011
- Port Lands, Toronto, Canada 2011
