= V Building =

- Interactive map of the V Building area

General information
- Status: On hold
- Location: Broad Street, Birmingham, England
- Coordinates: 52°28′40.91″N 1°54′20.91″W
- Construction started: 2006
- Completed: Unknown

Height
- Antenna spire: 152 metres (499 ft)
- Roof: 147 metres (482 ft)

Technical details
- Floor count: 51

Design and construction
- Architect: Eric Kuhne
- Developer: Dandara

The V Building (formerly known as Arena Central Tower) was a proposed 51-storey residential skyscraper approved for construction on Broad Street on the Westside of the city centre of Birmingham, England. The tower was part of the larger Arena Central development scheme on the former ATV / Central Television Studios, closed in 1997. The entire development site covered an area of 7.6 acres (31,000 m^{2}). On completion the development was set to include offices, shops, restaurants, cafes, leisure/entertainment, fitness centre and hotel. It was to have been built on the site of a multi-level underground car park next to Alpha Tower, one of the tallest buildings in Birmingham. The total cost of the entire scheme was expected to be £400 million and of the tower, £150 million.

The estimated completion date was initially set for 2009, but due to setbacks was extended to 2013. In 2009, the developers received a 5-year extension to planning permission; the council turned down a 10-year extension in the hope that work would begin before 2015.

The proposed scheme was cancelled during 2014 and alternative plans, which do not include a tall tower, were approved by Birmingham City Council.

== Original proposal ==
The V Building was not part of the original plan for Arena Central which was submitted in 1998 by Miller Group. No buildings in the design were taller than 20 storeys. However, the design was soon changed and a tower was incorporated later in the year. The design, by HOK Architects, was for a 50-storey tower which had a total height of 245 metres to the top of the spire and a roof height of 187 metres. At the time, that would have made the tower the tallest building in England, and one of the tallest in Europe. The building plan was referred to Deputy Prime Minister, John Prescott, in 2000 who disapproved of the tower and forced it to be scaled down to 187 metres. The amendments to the design were made and the entire scheme later received outline planning consent.

The 9/11 attacks in 2001 resulted in a number of setbacks for the project and it was significantly delayed. The building was considered a potential terrorist target if constructed and, in consequence, the Hampton Trust pulled out of the project as part owners. No news about the development was released for two years.

In 2003, Andy Ruhan of Bridgewaters Capital was found as a partner and papers were signed in 2004. In December 2004, planning permission, which would have run out for the tower in February 2005, was extended to December 2010.

== Redesign and a new proposal ==
=== Early history ===
Due to the problems the project encountered, a new masterplan was produced and Multiplex was awarded the contract for construction of the tower. The masterplan unveiled in 2006, however, did not specifically outline the details of individual buildings. A model of the tower was present, though the detail and the roof feature were not on the images released. The shape of the tower in the models confirmed that the design by HOK Architects was not to be used. It was described as going to appear as if it "is squeezed in the middle creating two bulges".

A news article in the Estate Gazette on 17 June 2006 stated that the height of the tower would be 175 metres and the Civil Aviation Authority agreed that it would not have any problems with the tower if it was 175 metres tall; however, they would have to comment on the planning application if any taller. Other news articles said the tower would be of 47 storeys though whether this is in reference to the old design or the new design is unclear.

In September 2006, it was revealed that construction would be delayed yet again. It was also revealed that the tower would be the first constructed part of the development due to the lack of demolition needed on the site.

On 12 February 2007, Arena Central Developments was granted a 250-year lease on the land by Birmingham City Council.

=== Team ===
Eric Kuhne of Eric R Kuhne & Associates and Civic Arts Architects was appointed by Dandara Ltd to design the form, the façades, the public realm, the lobbies and commercial tenancies of the tower. The apartments and the technical delivery have been designed by Scott Brownrigg Architects, with whom Eric Kuhne and Civic Arts Architects collaborated.

=== The design is revealed ===
The first indication of the design of the tower was revealed on the Pipers Models website. The website presented images of a model of the building that had been produced for the developers to be unveiled at the upcoming MIPIM show in Cannes, France. The design shown was different from what was quoted as having been "squeezed in the middle creating two bulges". Instead the design featured a tower of a 'V' shape rising from the base.

The tower was unveiled at the MIPIM show in Cannes in March 2007. Its name had been changed from Arena Central Tower/ Arena Square Tower to V Building highlighting the 'V' shape on the Suffolk Street Queensway elevation. It was initially quoted as having 50 storeys and being 150 metres tall.

The detailed planning application for the tower was submitted to the Birmingham City Council Planning Department on 13 June 2007 by agents Aims Ltd. The planning application for the tower also contained changes to the masterplan for the site. The proposal was described as:

Erection of new tower to include flats, restaurant & bar together with landscaping, car parking & means of access. Updated masterplan for the Arena Central site, bound by Broad Street, Suffolk Street Queensway, Holliday Street & Bridge Street, in accordance with condition 3 attached to application No. C/04238/97/OUT

The tower was approved by Birmingham City Council Planning Department on 4 October 2007. The Birmingham Post reported that it took two minutes for the councillors to make the decision. Construction of the tower was expected to begin in early 2008 for completion in 2013.

=== Design ===
The design of the tower had changed slightly from what was revealed at the MIPIM show in Cannes. The exterior of the building was a mixture of cladding with bars running across the windows. However, this was changed when the new renders for the tower were revealed after the submission of the planning application. The new renders showed the exterior to be brighter in colour.

The planning application explained that the reasoning behind the height decrease from 175 metres to 147 metres was due to the refusal from the adjacent hotel building, Crowne Plaza, to move out of its building and be given hotel space in the new tower, which would have increased the height to 175 metres. The owners of Crowne Plaza, Holiday Inn, had submitted a planning application before the application for V Building to refurbish the hotel.

At street level, near the entrance, there was to have been a plaza area which will consist of vertical concrete slabs with inscriptions written into them. The first two floors will be of double height, containing a restaurant and lounge for residents. The second floor will be cantilevered over the entrance. Beneath these would have been a two-storey underground car park. The footprint was decreased from that of the tower approved in the 2000 masterplan. This was to complement the residential use of the building, which had been proposed as mixed-use in the 2000 masterplan.

Whilst the roof height was planned to be 147 metres, the façade overrun increased the overall height to 152 metres. The roof line has a serrated edge. On the 50th floor there was to have been a sky bar with a public viewing platform, extended to three storeys, above which would have been a plant room. There was to be a total of 706 apartment units in the tower, 60 of which were to have been serviced suites. Facilities for the residents included a lounge on the ground floor and a library. Residents were to have had their own entrance to the building. This would provide access to the residents' reading room. A hotel-style lobby of 3,000 sq ft (280 m^{2}) would have provided public access to the three restaurants and the top floor sky bar.

== See also ==
- Big City Plan
- List of tallest buildings and structures in Birmingham
