= Djenné-Djenno =

Jenné-jeno
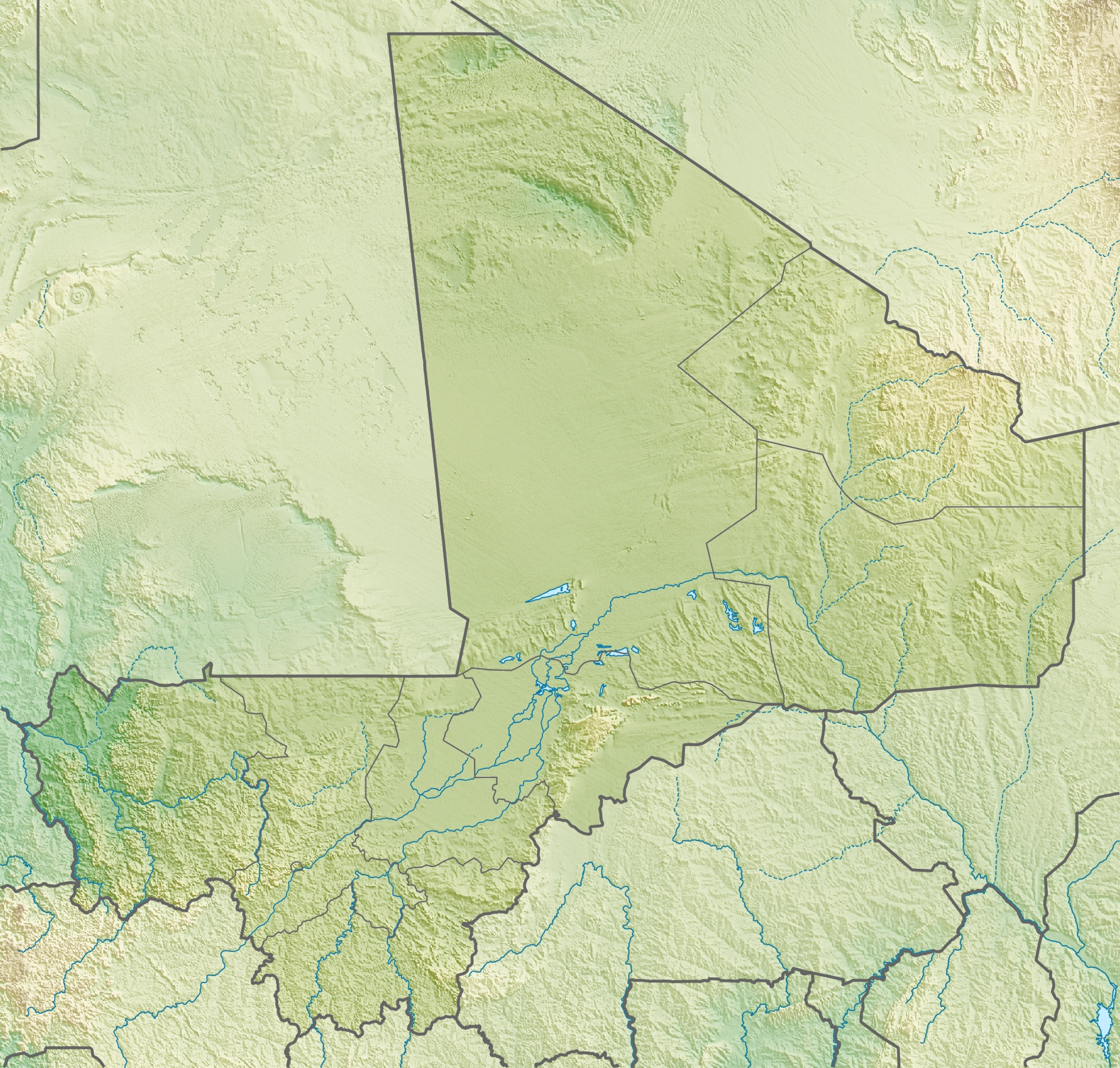
- Archaeological Site of Djenné-Djeno in Mali Djenné-Djenno (Africa)
- 13°53′26″N 4°32′25″W
- Location: Djenné Cercle, Mali

UNESCO World Heritage Site
- Official name: Old Towns of Djenné
- Type: Cultural
- Criteria: iii, iv
- Designated: 1988
- Reference no.: 116-01
- State: Mali
- Region: List of World Heritage Sites in Africa

Djenné-Djeno (also Jenne-Jeno; /ˈdʒɛniː dʒʌˌnoʊ/) is a UNESCO World Heritage Site located in the Niger River Valley in the country of Mali. Literally translated to "ancient Djenné", it is the original site of Djenné and is considered to be among the oldest urbanized centers and best-known archaeological sites in West Africa.

This archaeological site is located about three kilometres (two miles) from the modern town, and is believed to have been involved in long distance trade and the domestication of African rice. The site is an occupation mound up to six meters high that covered 33 hectares (82 acres) in area when first mapped in 1977. Based on archaeological excavations mainly by Roderick and Susan McIntosh, the site is known to have been occupied from 250 BC to 1400 AD. Previously, scholars did not believe that advanced trade networks and complex societies developed in West Africa until traders started coming from the north. However, sites such as Djenné-Djeno disprove this, as these traditions in West Africa flourished long before.

More recently, scholars have concluded that the egalitarian civilization of Djenné-Djeno was likely established by the Mande progenitors of the Bozo people. Their habitation of the site spanned the period from 3rd century BCE to 14th century CE.

== History ==
=== Origins ===
While Djenne-Djeno is among the oldest urban sites in the Niger basin, a similar settlement at Dia existed from around 900 BCE. Other research at Dia indicates a subsequently complex chronology of early occupation, periodic abandonment, and erosion of deposits, followed by a widespread phase of mud brick architecture in the fourteenth and fifteenth centuries AD. Oral traditions hold that Djenne-Djeno was founded by immigrants from Dia.

=== Phase I/II ===
Radiocarbon dating has estimated that people first settled at Djenné-Djeno permanently in about 250 BCE. This first occupation of the site (which lasted from 250 BCE to 50 CE) is known as Phase I and is some of the earliest evidence for iron production in West Africa. This initial phase is not associated with the Later Stone Age, and there has never been an occupation from this period at the site, or evidence for it has never been found. Until 250 BCE, the area surrounding Djenné-Djeno was either uninhabited or visited by nomadic groups that stayed for short periods. Geomorphological data show that the region consisted mostly of swampland at that time. Groups only began permanently occupying the area after a dry episode in which annual flooding receded and decreased the size of the swamps. Faunal remains at the site from this occupation have included catfish and Nile perch, but mostly cow, leading to the assumption that this first phase might be associated with hunter-gatherer or pastoral modes of subsistence. Definitive evidence of domesticated rice appears during this early occupation. The occupation mound expanded rapidly and may have covered as much as 100,000 square meters by 400 CE. It is inferred from this that rice domestication likely contributed to population growth. Saharan ceramic styles are similar to the oldest ceramics found in Djenne-Djeno, dated to 250 BCE. These early ceramic and metallurgical attestations have been cited by Susan and Roderick McIntosh as evidence that the Inland Niger Delta was integrated into trans-Saharan exchange networks well before the Arab conquests of North Africa.

=== Later Phases ===
Phase III dates from about 400 to 900 AD and is believed to have an even higher population based on crowded cemeteries. The site also has evidence for a more intensive occupation through deep house deposits, possibly from multiple generations. A shift in trade routes helped this population growth, including attracting immigrants from Dia. By c. 800 CE, Djenne and its environs likely housed between 10,000 and 27.000 people. Other developments include the presence of permanent mud brick architecture, including a city wall, probably built during the latter half of the first millennium CE using the cylindrical bricks historically made by Djenné masons. The wall "was 3.7 meters wide at its base and ran almost two kilometers around the town".

Phase IV dates from about 900 to 1400 AD. After reaching its maximum extent of over 33 hectares by 1000 AD, the city experienced a slow decline in population and eventually a total abandonment. However, very little is known about why this decline happened, and more research is needed. By the end, the site's occupation had created a large tear-shaped mound (known as a tell) consisting of layer upon layer of occupation that had built up over time. This tell was surrounded by 69 other occupation mounds, created by their occupants through the building and rebuilding of their houses. Throughout the site's occupations, pottery fragments are abundant.

== Terra-cotta figurines from the Inner Niger Delta region ==
Some of the more interesting clay artifacts begin in Phase II with terra-cotta statuettes and representations of humans and animals on pottery. These statuettes are important to the understanding of Phase II because along with this art, the first evidence for large-scale rice cultivation and population rise. All of these attributes are commonly associated with complex societies. It is believed that these artifacts had a ritual, as opposed to a domestic function. Some of these clay figurines are similar to those made by modern Fulani pastoralists for children, which might be evidence for the importance of domesticated cows at the site. One human statuette in particular has been the cause of much debate. It was found on a house floor around small bowls full of suspected offerings. Two others have been found in similar context 11 kilometers away from the site of Djenné-Djeno and it is hypothesized that they are the representations of a household spirit, as ancestral cults are known to have flourished in the area as late as the 20th century.

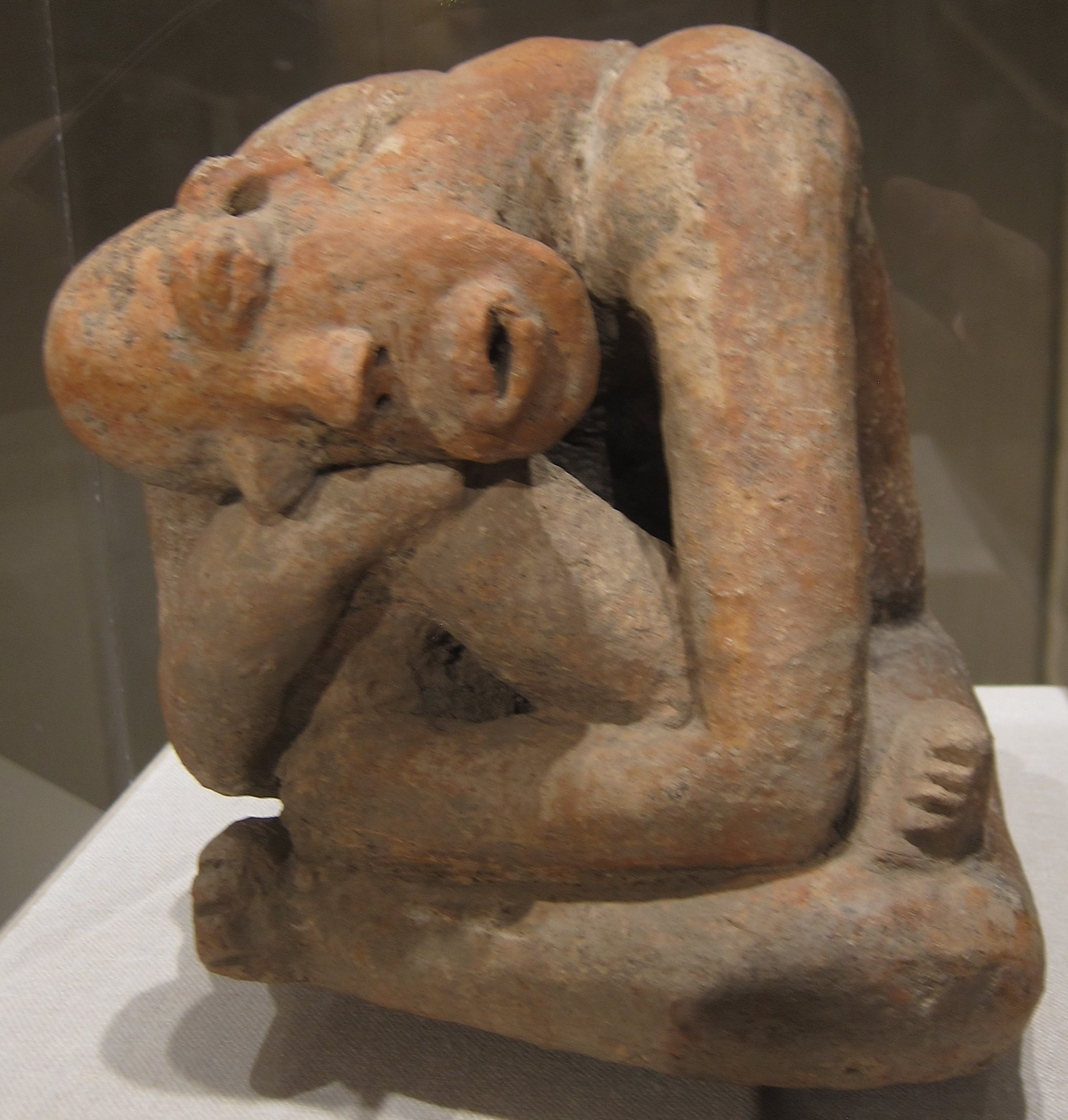
Terracotta seated figure; 13th century; earthenware; 29.9 cm (11 3/4 in) high; Metropolitan Museum of Art (New York City, USA) The raised marks and indentations on the back of this hunched Djenné figure may represent disease or, more likely, scarification patterns. The facial expression and pose could depict an individual in mourning or in pain

Djenné-Djeno is famous for its terracotta figurines which depict humans and animals including snakes and horses. Before the site's excavation in 1977, many of these sculptures were in circulation, being sold as tourist souvenirs and fine art to the West. During this time, Mali was experiencing food scarcity due to the Sahelian drought; and it was unlikely for many to be upset about any money that came into the country. The sale of cultural antiquities has been prohibited since 1970, with the creation of the UNESCO Convention on the Means of Prohibiting and Preventing the Illicit Import, Export and Transfer of Ownership of Cultural Property, which by agreement placed all such cultural property under protection. Conflict between ownership and control of artifacts still remains a problem in the region as well as in many other parts of the world as there is a difference between prohibitions and actual, domestic laws and international laws and treaties governing the exhumation, rights to ownership, export and import of such material. For instance, the US government only affected a ban on the importation of Malian antiquities in 1993. a b Other sculptures in West Africa have faced similar challenges. In Nigeria, Nok culture figurines dating back as far as 800 BC also became popular in black market trade in the 1990s. The US and Nigeria signed a bi-lateral agreement on this matter only in 2022. While it is believed by some that little scientific work has been done on these figurines, and that most of them are in circulation around the globe today, the fact is there is insufficient data to determine how much material remains undiscovered. Recently, 300 km (200 mi) from Djenné-Djeno, in Timbuktu cultural property has also been threatened. Ethical battles over antiquities are hard to define as "the conflicts are multifaceted, questions of innocence and guilt often – through not always – hard to pin down." Art dealers and collectors depend on such trade, while the looting of artifacts from archaeological sites destroys their historical context and clouds their integrity. One may also reasonably argue that objects left in the ground are under continuous pressure from floods, shifting earth and construction activities. It has been suggested by many to have a blackout of information on those figurines that were not excavated scientifically, which primarily includes black market items, as it is believed that drawing Western attention to these items would increase their market value. Some claim this could hurt art historians and dealers, as it would be difficult for them to know how to distinguish artifacts from fakes. However, there are both subjective and scientific means such as a combination of Thermoluminescent (TL) testing and CT scanning that can reliably identify fake and compromised (pastiche) works.

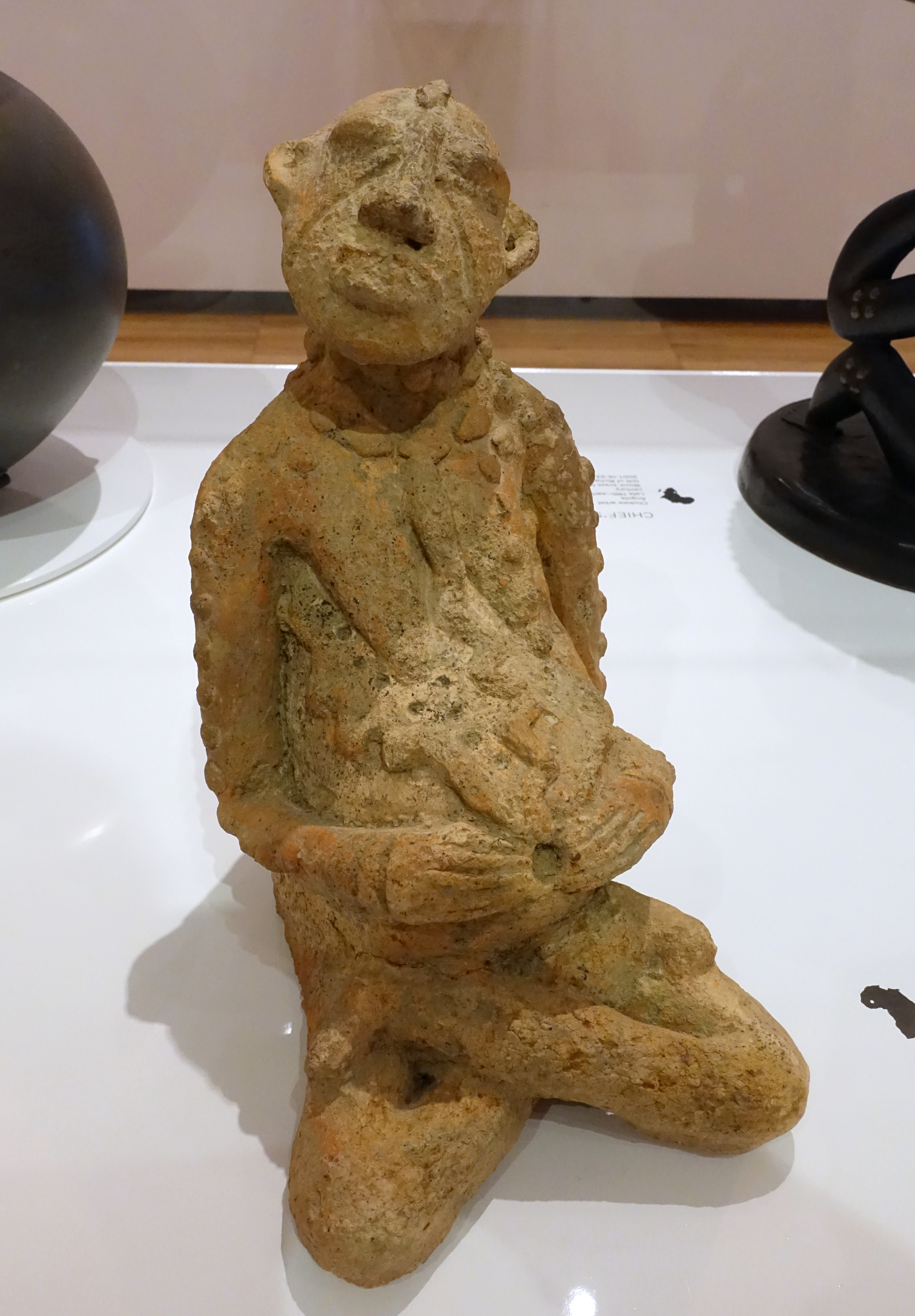
Seated female figure; circa 12th to 15th century AD; terracotta; Krannert Art Museum (Illinois, USA)

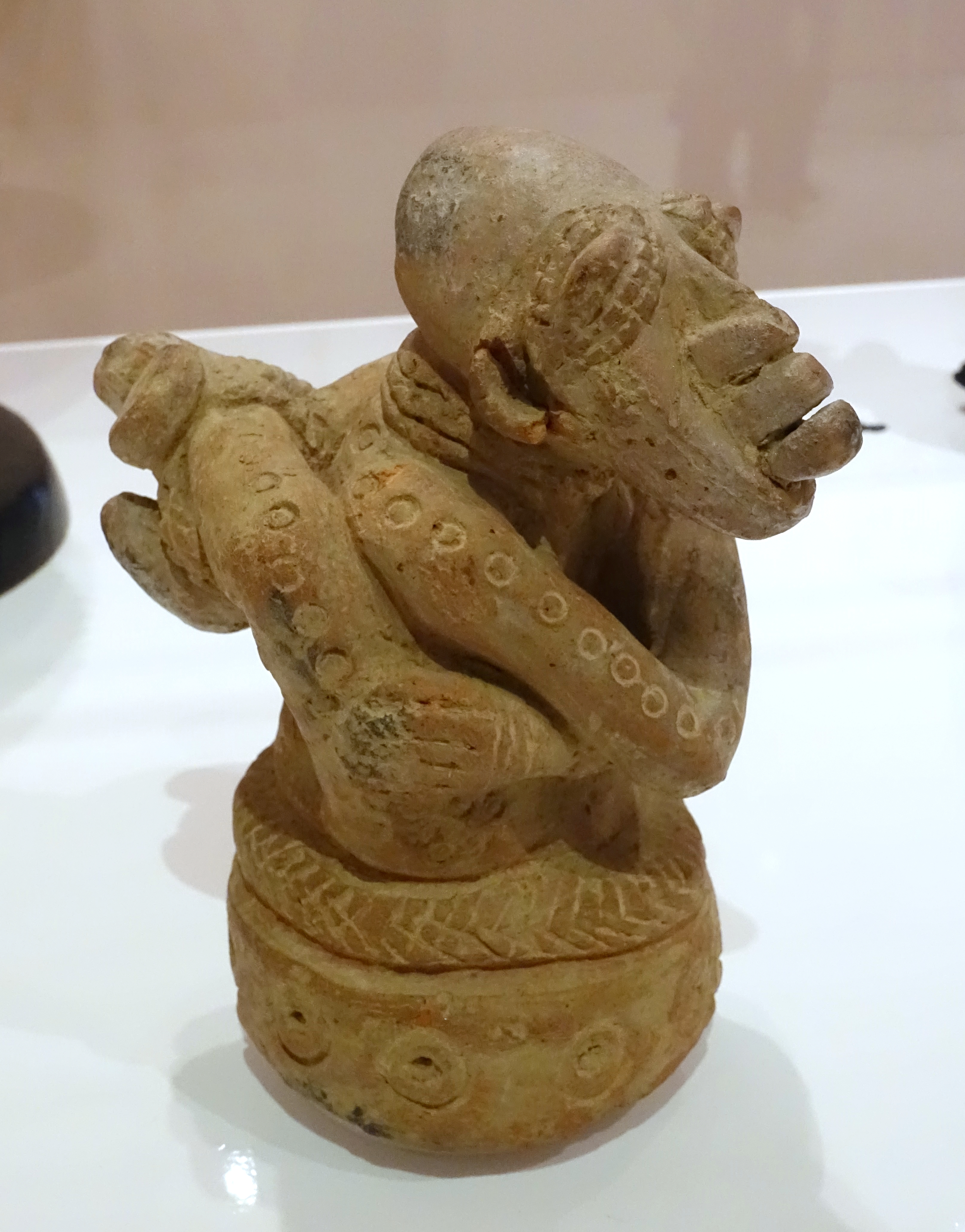
Bound figure; circa 12th to 15th century AD; terracotta; Krannert Art Museum (Illinois, USA)

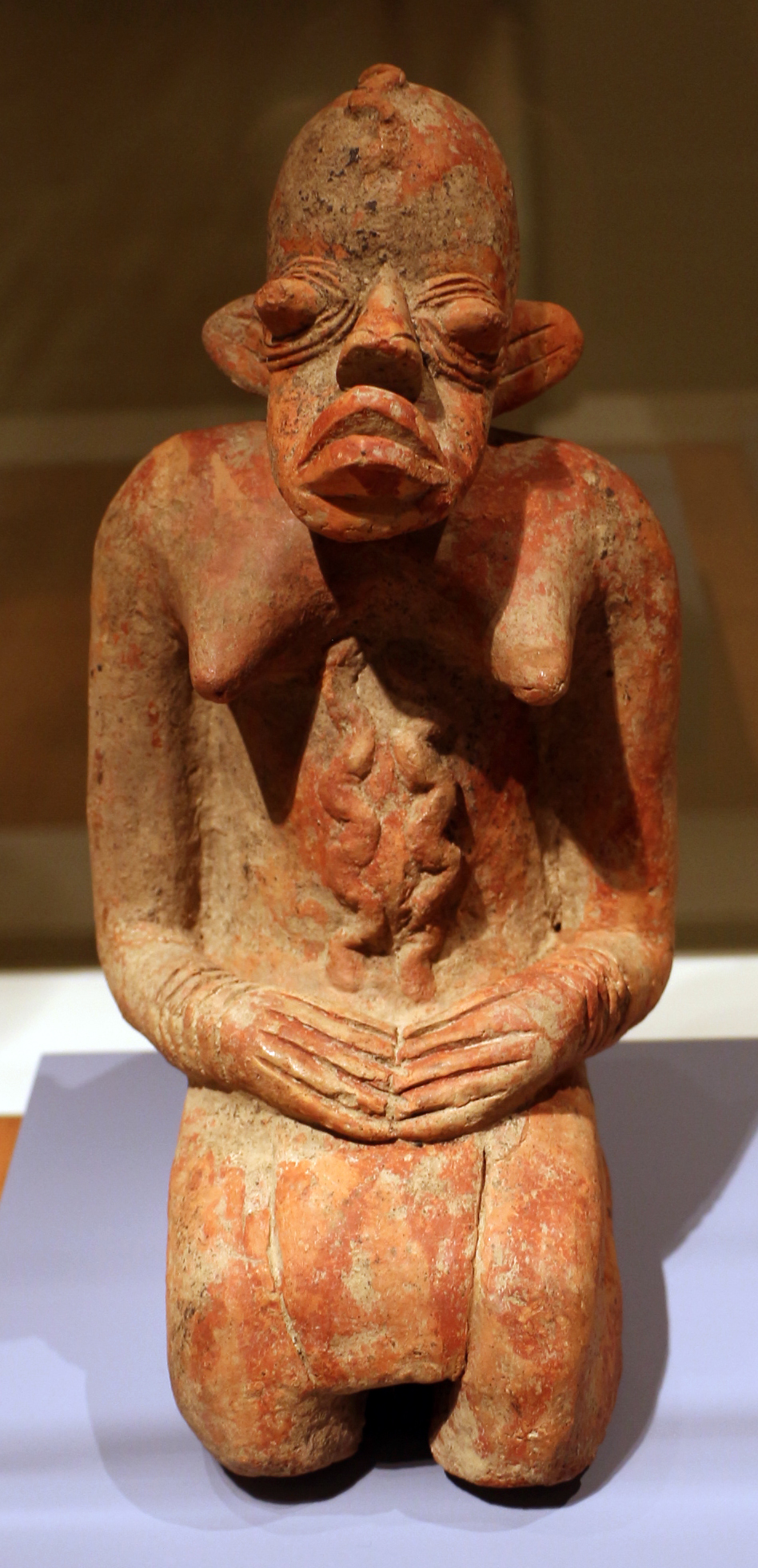
Female figure on her knees; 15th–18th century; Indianapolis Museum of Art (USA)

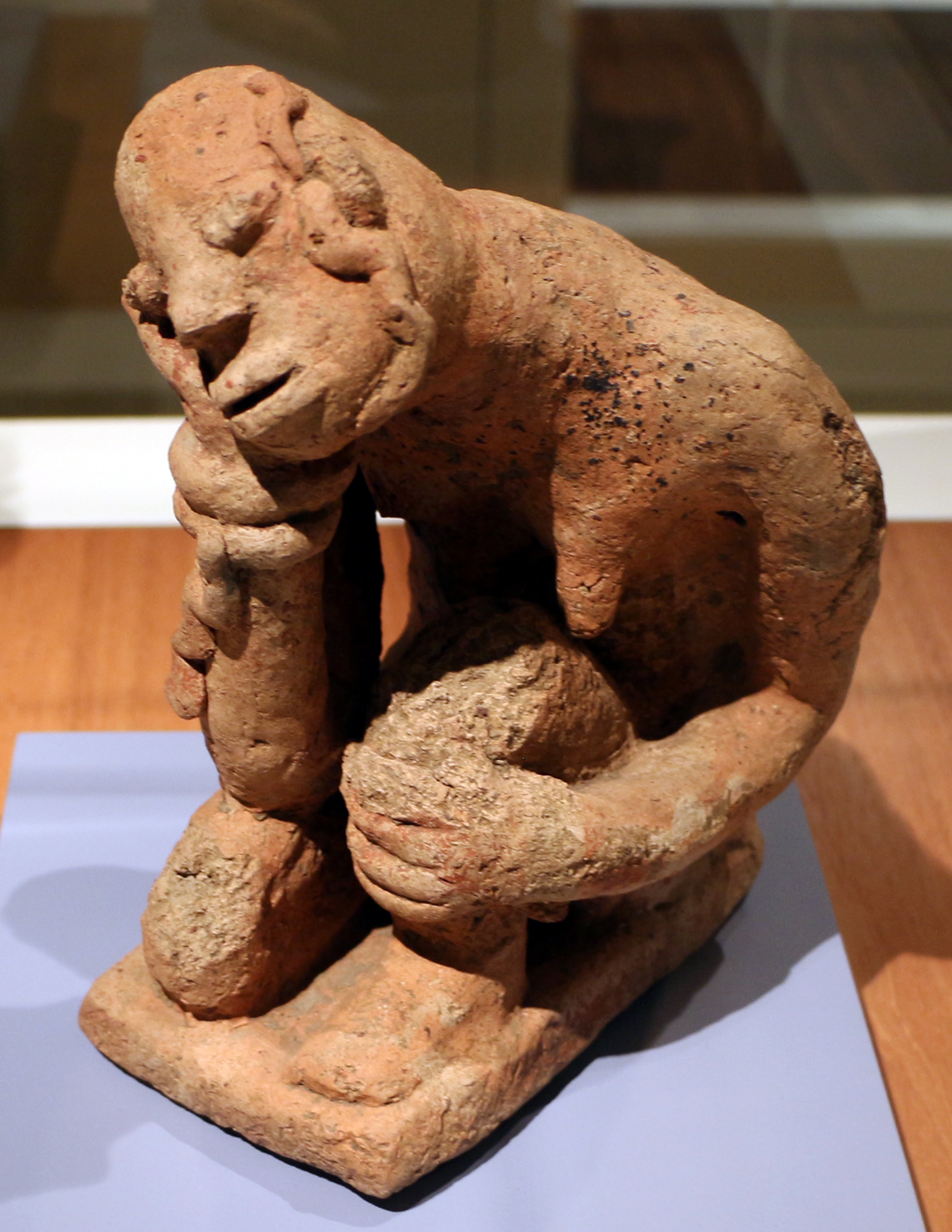
Figure with arched back; 15th–18th century; Indianapolis Museum of Art (USA)

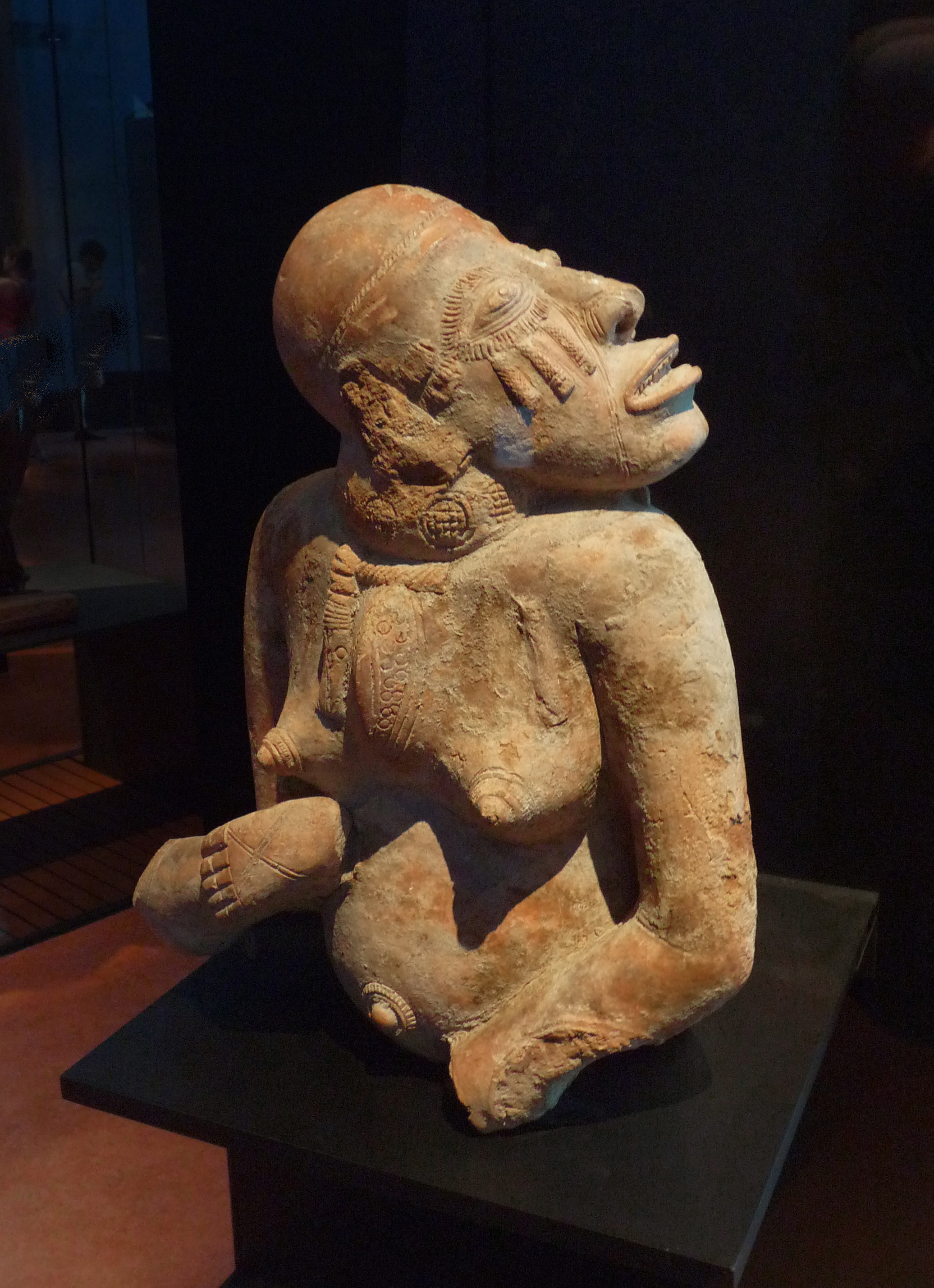
Female figure; 13th–15th century; terracotta covered with red ochre; height: 37.5 cm (14.7 in), width: 31 cm (12.2 in), depth: 24 cm (9.4 in); Musée du quai Branly (Paris)

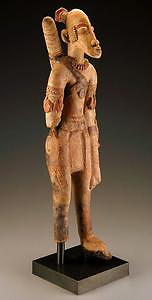
Figure of an archer; circa 13th–15th century

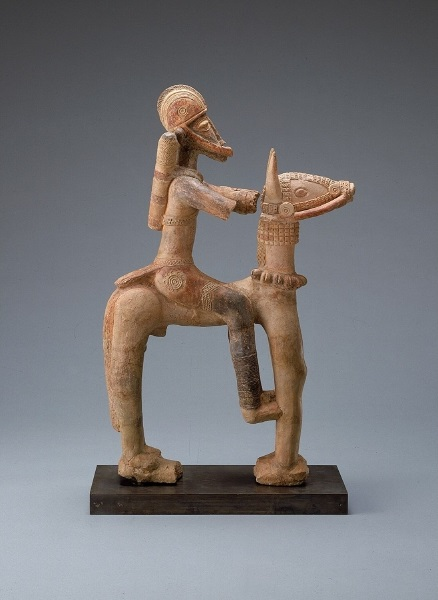
Equestrian figure; circa 13th–15th century

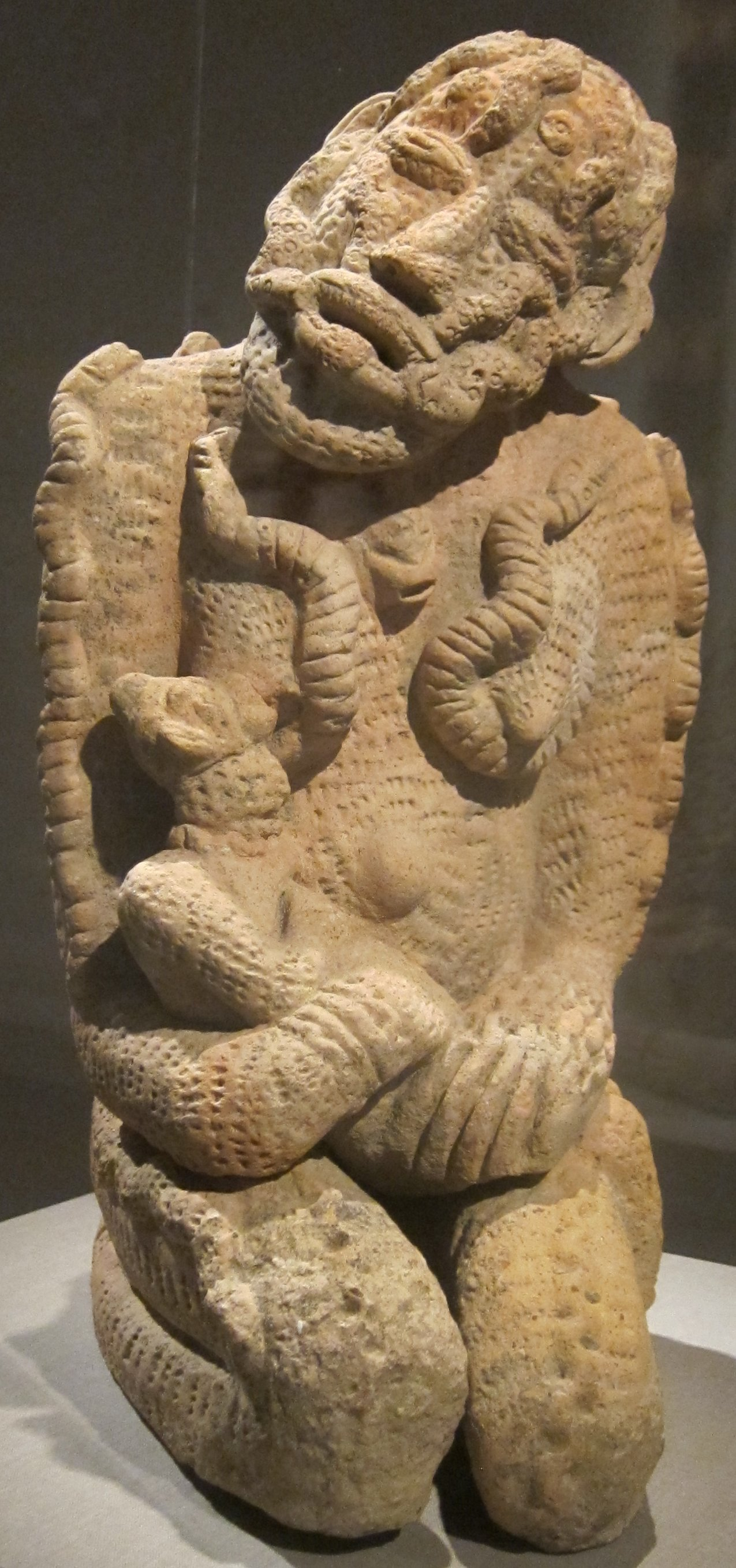
Maternity scene; 1100–1400; De Young Museum (San Francisco, USA)

Fragment of a Kneeling Figure, Inland Niger Delta, Mali, 11th-14th century. Art Institute of Chicago.

== Agriculture and urban organization ==
Historically, the Inland Niger Delta has been an ideal location for the mass production of staples such as rice, millet and vegetables due to its floods and summer rains. These can, however, be unpredictable from year to year. Many believe this area was the leader in African rice domestication, however more research is needed. Along with agriculture, domestic cow, sheep and goat are present at the site. The land surrounding Djenné-Djeno lent itself to such high-yielding crops due to its mixture of highland and floodplain soils at different elevations that allowed floodwater farming of rice. Moreover, the Djenné-Djeno site lies in close proximity to dunes, where cattle can be moved during the annual floods, and millet can be cultivated. Overall, the diversified sources of food provided food security that allowed for permanent settlement in a region of volatile climate. It is believed that this food production, especially that of African rice, was one of the main contributors to population rise in the city of Djenné-Djeno and was widely exported to nearby centers (including Timbuktu).

The Djenné-Djeno urban complex consists of 40 mounds within a four-kilometer radius. The configuration of the mounds helped “segmented” communities to surmount the ecological challenges caused by the volatile weather patterns characteristic of the Middle Niger. The fact that the mounds remained spatially separate allowed communities to specialize their trade while the relative proximity of the mounds facilitated the exchange of goods and services between these communities. It is believed that instead of a ruling elite, Djenné-Djeno split power between corporate groups and this is reflected in the clustered organization at the site. This means that unlike places like Egypt, Djenné-Djeno was not highly stratified and evidence for a very wealthy ruling class has never been found. This urban configuration incentivized peaceful reciprocity between the communities, which in turn caused the communities to specialize, further leading to the prosperity of the community as a whole. It is hypothesized that clusters held people of similar ethnic groups and craft specializations, which would set the city up for extensive trade and growth.

== Trade ==
Djenné-Djeno likely grew to such a vast size as a result of regional and local trade. For many years, it was assumed that complex societies, art and long distance trade came to this region with the Arab arrival in the seventh and eighth centuries. Archaeological evidence however supports that Djenné-Djeno was part of a pre-Arab trans-Saharan trade network. It has been hypothesized that the city grew as a trade center due to its location on the southern portion of the agriculturally productive region of the delta. It was likely that rice produced in this region would have been a valuable staple traded for Saharan commodities such as salt, copper and dried fish. Djenné-Djeno would have been an excellent middle ground between traders from North Africa and the Mediterranean and other parts of sub-Saharan Africa. No doubt the town's proximity to other large urban centers such as Timbuktu also helped this trade network thrive.

Specifically, glass beads found at the site have been dated to as early as the third century BC and appear to originate from Asia to the Mediterranean Near East. Copper ornaments have also been found in early Phase III deposits, which shows these trade networks date to earlier than previously thought. These discoveries lend support to the existence of sporadic contacts between West and North Africa throughout the first millennium AD.

== Sources ==
- McIntosh, Roderick J.; McIntosh, Susan Keech (1981). "The inland Niger delta before the empire of Mali: evidence from Jenne-jeno". Journal of African History. 22 (1): 1–22. doi:10.1017/S0021853700018983. JSTOR 182149. S2CID 162284097.
- McIntosh, Roderick J.; McIntosh, Susan Keech (2003). "Early urban configurations on the Middle Niger: Clustered cities and landscapes of power". In Smith, Monica L. (ed.). The Social Construction of Ancient Cities. Washington, DC: Smithsonian Books. pp. 103–120. ISBN 9781588340986.
