= N'Diaye Ramatoulaye Diallo =

Malian politician

Ramatoulaye Diallo N'Diaye Minister of Culture, Handicrafts and Tourism
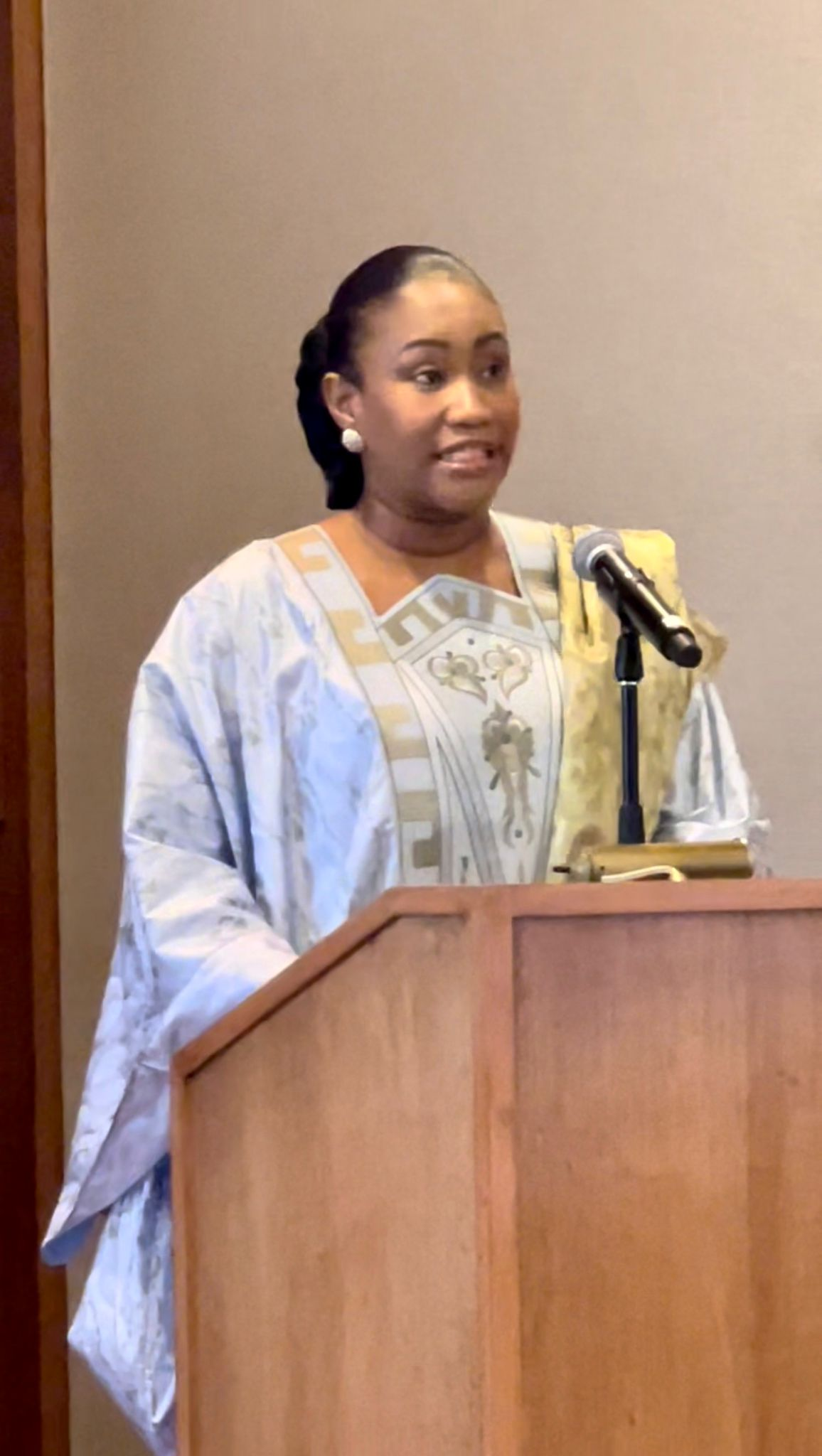
- Ramatoulaye Diallo making a speech during the Human Capital Africa Conference in 2022
- In office 2014–2020

N’Diaye Ramatoulaye Diallo is a Malian politician and entrepreneur. She was the Minister of Handicrafts, Tourism and Culture in Mali from 2014 to 2020.

She is the daughter of Diallo Lalla Sy, a Malian politician, the former Minister of Employment and Public Service.

== Career ==
She began in the private sector where as founder of the earliest public relations agency (since 1998), she advises and supports the development of several private companies and affixes her mark of creativity on the major international events that have marked the Malian scene between 2000 and 2010. Her political rise stemmed from efforts to mobilize citizens for widespread participation in voting, particularly during a time of public disaffection, distrust in political elites, and general disenchantment among the Malian population. She later entered the political arena and, in 2013, became the deputy director of the presidential campaign for Ibrahim Boubacar Keïta, who at the time represented hopes for change and national sovereignty. Appointed Minister of Handicrafts, Tourism and Culture, she designed and implemented a vast program entitled Timbuktu Renaissance and passes the first law on intellectual property, which recognizes the status of artists and their right to live. of their work. She also launched a program to renew festivals in Mali. She launched in 2019 the initiative Mirii Blon in order to gather cultural actors and create synergy between the actors of the field and help culture blossoms in Mali. At internationally level, she is also the initiator of the first African Cultural Governance Barometer, a tool that aims to operationalize the Charter for the Cultural Renaissance of the African Union. She was a Special Advisor to UAE for Dubai Expo 2020 for Africa and Francophone countries. She is currently the founder and CEO of GGWoA Foundation.

== Education ==
After completing her studies in 1993, she earned an International Bachelor of Arts in Communication and Marketing from Barry University in Miami in 1996, followed by a Master's degree in Marketing and Advertising from Columbus University in 1998. She also holds a postgraduate degree in strategic management and economic intelligence from Economic Warfare School of Paris.

== Recognition ==
In April 2017, the new government of Mali renewed her appointment as Minister of Culture, citing her previous accomplishments, including streamlining staff within her department and implementing a consensual agreement aimed at enabling artists to earn a decent living from their copyrights. She has been honored as an Officer of the National Order of Mali, a Commander of the National Order of Merit of France and is a recipient of the Commemorative Medal for the 70th anniversary of UNESCO.
