= Ibrahim Ag Mohamed Assaleh =

Azawadi politician

Ibrahim Ag Mohamed Assaleh is an Azawadi politician. He has served as member of the National Assembly of Mali. During the early phases of the Northern Mali conflict he served as National Movement for the Liberation of Azawad (MNLA) external relations Representative, before starting his own party, the Coalition for the People of Azawad (CPA) (French: Coalition du peuple pour l’Azawad), in March 2014, after a fallout with MNLA leader Bilal Ag Acherif.

== Career ==
Assaleh has served as member of the National Assembly of Mali for the Bourem constituency. Assaleh was active as a mediator in kidnapping for ransom cases in Northern Mali.

He led the talks for the MNLA with ECOWAS leaders and Burkinabé President Blaise Compaoré in Burkina Faso in June 2012. At the meeting he declared that the MNLA was willing to negotiate with the Malian government with the ECOWAS mediators.

He had a Malian government arrest warrant until October 2013, when it was lifted due to his work in the reconciliation process of the country.

On 18 March 2014 the Coalition for the People of Azawad (CPA) was declared with Assaleh as its chairperson. It was declared in the name of political and MNLA cadres and it claimed a council with 32 members was established. Though shortly thereafter one of the named members was surprised by his appointment and declared his loyalty to the MNLA. The reason for the establishment of the CPA was impatience with the hardline approach of MNLA leader Bilal Ag Acherif in the negotiations with the Malian government. At the creation of the CPA it apparently had Algerian support. Assaleh claimed the independence of Azawad was not a goal for him and the party. At the time of his departure he argued that 70% of the militants were following him.

In September 2014 the CPA led by Assaleh started the second round of negotiations with the Malian government and other rebel groups. The CPA was said to be closer to the Malian government's view than three other parties, including the MNLA. Assaleh promoted an Iraqi Kurdistan type of autonomy for the Azawad region within Mali.
