= Battle of Tabankort (2019) =

2019 terror attack

- Part of Mali War
Date	18 November 2019
Location	Tabankort, Menaka Cercle, Mali
Result	ISGS victory

Belligerents
Mali	Islamic State in the Greater Sahara

Strength
~150	Unknown: Several vehicles and motorcycles

Casualties and losses
43 killed (per Mali and Niger); 30 killed (per ISGS); 30 injured (per ISGS)	17 killed (per Mali); 100 apprehended (per Mali)

On November 18, 2019, Malian troops were ambushed by the Islamic State in the Greater Sahara during a patrol of Tabankort, in Ménaka Cercle, Mali.

== Attack ==
While attempting to meet up with a contingent of Nigerien troops as part of Operation Tongo-Tongo, a reprisal operation for an ambush that left several American and Nigerian soldiers dead, a group of jihadists ambushed and overpowered a group of Malian soldiers. The jihadists rode on seven vehicles, several motorcycles, and two tuk-tuks stolen from a local medical center, and posed as vaccination staff members to conduct the attack.

Once the jihadists' disguises were exposed, a battle ensued between ISGS and the Malian troops. Around one hundred fifty Malian soldiers fought, with thirteen vehicles. They were forced to pull back, and the group of 850 Nigerien soldiers began a combing operation in the Tabankort valley, bringing back the bodies of slain Malian soldiers.

== Aftermath ==
ISGS claimed responsibility for the attack on November 20. They also claimed that 30 Malian soldiers were killed, and thirty more were injured.

The Malian army claimed on November 18 that the death toll was 24 soldiers killed and 29 injured, while seventeen jihadists were killed and over a hundred apprehended. An AFP source then claimed the next day that the Malian death toll was over thirty killed. The bodies of the 30 soldiers killed were interred during a military ceremony in Gao on November 20. However, the bodies of thirteen other soldiers were discovered on November 21, bringing the death toll to 43 killed.
