= Platform (Mali) =

Malian alliance of pro-government armed groups

Platform of the Movements of 14 June 2014 in Algiers
- Other name: Platform Self-Defense Movements; Platform
- Founded: June 14, 2014
- Part of: CSP-PSD (2021–2023)

The Platform of the Movements of 14 June 2014 in Algiers (French: Plateforme des mouvements du 14 juin 2014 d'Alger), also called the Platform of Self-Defense Movements and colloquially Platform, is an alliance of pro-government armed groups. It was formed during the Mali War peace negotiations on June 14, 2014, in Algiers. Platform joined the Coordination of Azawad Movements in the Permanent Strategic Framework for Peace, Security, and Development (CSP-PSD) in May 2021, then withdrew in September 2023.

== Organization ==
Platform consists of the following movements:

- Imghad Tuareg Self-Defense Group and Allies (GATIA)
- Coordination of Movements and Patriotic Resistance Front, a coalition of three movements
  - Ganda Koy
  - Ganda Iso
  - Northern Mali Liberation Forces (FLN)
- Pro-government factions within the Arab Movement of Azawad (MAA), called MAA-Loyalist
- Popular Movement for the Salvation of Azawad (MPSA, until November 2017, joined the Coordination of Inclusivity Movements)
- Popular Front of Azawad (FPA)
- Movement for the Defense of the Fatherland (MDP), formed in June 2016
- Movement for the Salvation of Azawad (MSA, June 2019–September 2023)

== Alliances ==
On May 6, 2021, Platform joined the Coordination of Azawad Movements (CMA) in forming the Permanent Strategic Framework for Peace, Security, and Development (CSP-PSD). Platform left the CSP-PSD on September 26, 2023, following the outbreak of war between the CMA and the Malian government.
