= Dandara Touré =

Minister for the Promotion of Women, Children and the Family
- In office 16 February 2012 – 22 March 2012
- Prime Minister: Cissé Mariam Kaïdama Sidibé

Personal details
- Born: 1 October 1951 (age 74) Kita, French Sudan (now Mali)

Dandara Touré (born 1 October 1951) is a Malian politician. Touré has worked in education and women's rights for many years. She was appointed Minister for the Promotion of Women, Children and the Family in the cabinet of Cissé Mariam Kaïdama Sidibé on 16 February 2012. The 2012 Malian coup d'état meant that she was removed from office just 34 days later. Touré has since campaigned for democratic reforms in the country, opposing changes to the constitution which would have increased the powers of the president.

== Career ==
Touré was born in Kita on 1 October 1951 in what was then known as French Sudan. She was awarded a bachelor's degree in 1973 and a master's degree from the Ecole Normale Supérieure of Bamako in 1977. Touré taught biology in Malian public schools before studying for a second master's degree in public health with a specialism in nutrition from Indiana University Bloomington.

Upon her return to Mali she worked for the Directorate of Higher Education and on a joint project between the Ministry of Education and USAID to encourage the enrolment of girls in school. In 1994 Touré became a lecturer in social science at the Institut supérieur de formation et de recherche appliquée and in 1996 was responsible for coordinating 31 non-governmental organisations working together on a family planning and AIDS control programme. Touré has advised the government on technical matters relating to poverty, malnutrition, contraception and female genital mutilation. She was appointment National Director for the Advancement of Women by the government in 2004. Touré speaks French, English, Bambara and Fulani. She is married with three children.

Touré was appointed Minister for the Promotion of Women, Children and the Family on 16 February 2012 in the cabinet of prime minister Cissé Mariam Kaïdama Sidibé. She served in the role for only 34 days, being relieved of the position on 22 March as a result of the 2012 Malian coup d'état. Touré opposed the military government and became a democracy activist. As president of the Platform for Women in Opposition Parties she led opposition to the proposed constitutional amendment of July/August 2017. She said this would have increased the powers of the president, established an expensive upper house of parliament and diverted funds from women's causes.
