= Téréba Togola =

Malian archaeologist

Téréba Togola (1948–2005) was a Malian archaeologist from the region of Sikasso. He participated in the country's first national inventory of its archaeological sites.

== Biography ==
Togola was born in Bougouni Cercle, Sikasso in 1948 to a Bambara village chief and one of his later wives who was thought to be barren; in the Bambara language, Téréba translates to "surprise" or "miraculous birth". For some time he worked as a teacher in the Kayes Region. After studying at the Ecole Normale Supérieure of Bamako, he was introduced to archaeology by Michel Raimbault in 1982. He was employed by the Institut des Sciences Humaines and began conducting archaeological expeditions to the Lakes Region. In 1984, he accompanied Rainbault in an expedition to Kawinza in the Timbuktu Region.

In 1986 he received a Fulbright Fellowship to Rice University where he eventually completed an MA and PhD with Roderick and Susan McIntosh. Later he would continue excavations with them at the Djenné-Jeno site (1994, 1997, 1999) and others within the Timbuktu Region, documented by National Geographic. In January 1987 they became the first to excavate Dia. By 1987, Togola's work with the McIntoshes had documented 108 Iron Age sites in Mali. In 1989–1990, he worked extensively with Kevin MacDonald, then of the University of Cambridge, and undertook vigorous investigations in the Mema, where they inventoried 137 sites, including 32 of the Neolithic period. In 2003 and 2004, he organized another expedition to the Mema with a Japanese team.

Togola was instrumental in securing Tombeau des Askia of Gao as a UNESCO World Heritage Site and also protecting the Timbuktu monuments during his term as Cultural Minister. He excavated the mosques of Gao and authored works on it. He was "dedicated to a thorough reconstruction of the country's rich past, and his own publications." He was also the author of The Inland Delta and the Manding Mountains, and Archaeological Investigations of Iron Age sites in the Mema Region, Mali (West Africa) (2008).

Togola was a member of several organizations, including Association pour le Développement de l’Arrondissement de Koumantou, Association des Etudes Mandé, Association des Historiens du Mali, Association OuestAfricaine d’Archéologie, Association Panafricaine de Préhistoire et Disciplines Assimilées, Comité Scientifique pour le Développement de la Boucle du Baoulé, Karité Mali, Réseau des archéologues africains, and Société des Archéologues Africanistes. He served as the National Director of Cultural Heritage within Mali's Ministry of Culture from 1998; he died of kidney failure in 2005. Five years earlier, he received the honorary title Chevalier de l’Ordre National du Mali (Knight of the National Order of Mali).

== See also ==
- History of Mali
- List of heritage registers
