= Yoro Ould Daha =

- Birth name: Mahri Sidi Amar Ben Daha
- Born: January 1, 1978; Djebok, Mali
- Died: February 9, 2020; Tamkoutat, Mali
- Cause of death: Assassination
- Allegiance: MOJWA (2012-2014); MAA-Loyalist (2014-2020); Platform (2014-2020)
- Rank: Military commander (Platform)
- Battles / wars: Mali War: Battle of Tabankort (2014)

Mahri Sidi Amar Ben Daha, nom de guerre Yoro Ould Daha, was a Malian Arab warlord who fought in Movement for Oneness and Jihad in West Africa (MOJWA) and the Arab Movement of Azawad's pro-government faction.

== Biography ==
Daha was born on January 1, 1978, to a Lemhar Arab family in Djebok, Mali. He was a child when the Tuareg rebellion of the 1990s broke out, but received his first military training during the conflict. Daha claimed to have fought in the 1990s rebellion in clashes between Arabs and Kuntas, and then later between Arabs and Ganda Koy. Before the Mali War broke out in 2012, Daha joined the ranks of MOJWA, becoming a senior officer in the Islamic police of Gao. He joined Katiba Osama Bin Laden, led by Ahmed al-Tilemsi. In 2014, Daha claimed to have never fought against the Malian Army. His rationale for joining MOJWA, according to a 2014 interview, was that MOJWA consisted of drug traffickers and those looking for money, and protected them from the MNLA.

Daha served as the leader of the mafia wing of MOJWA, engaging in drug trafficking. He stated in 2014 that he was working with drug traffickers before joining MOJWA. When French forces intervened in Mali through Operation Serval, Daha fled to Algeria, with his house in Gao being looted by residents. Daha joined the Arab Movement of Azawad and Platform in April 2014, becoming one of the military commanders of the movement. That July, he clashed with MNLA, HCUA, and rebel MAA fighters at a military base in Tarkint. He then fought in the Battle of Tabankort in 2014, becoming the military commander of Platform.

Daha was arrested by the French Army on the night between July 28–29, 2014, on suspicion of being involved in a July 14 attack that killed a French soldier. He was questioned for four to five days, and then handed to Malian authorities in Bamako. Daha was released by Mali on August 7. In an August 2014 interview, Daha reaffirmed his pro-Malian and pro-French positions, but claimed that he believed France was sympathetic to the MNLA.

Daha was arrested in Niamey by Nigerien authorities on December 3, 2015, but was released shortly afterward. The United Nations adopted sanctions against Daha on July 9, 2019, for violating the Algiers Accords. He was banned from traveling outside of Mali in response. Daha and his bodyguard were assassinated by unknown men traveling on motorcycles at a camp in Tamkoutat, Gao Region, on February 9, 2020.
