= Battle of Tabankort (2014) =

- Part of Mali War
Date	July 19–22, 2014
Location	Tabankort, Gao Region, Mali
Result	Indecisive

Belligerents
GATIA; MAA-Loyalist; CM-FPR MINUSMA	MNLA; HCUA; MAA-Dissident

Commanders and leaders
El Hadj Ag Gamou; Yoro Ould Daha	Hassan Ag Fagaga

Strength
200	Unknown

Casualties and losses
6 killed 15 injured	10 killed 35 injured
- Several dozen killed and injured

Between July 19 and 22, 2014, pro-government rebels from GATIA and other militias clashed with rebels from the MNLA, HCUA, and dissident MAA in Tabankort, rural Gao Region, Mali. Clashes were paused after MINUSMA intervened.

== Background ==
On May 21, 2014, rebels from the National Movement for the Liberation of Azawad, the High Council for the Unity of Azawad, and the dissident faction of the Arab Movement of Azawad defeated Malian and pro-Malian forces in Kidal, effectively capturing the city. The rebels also took control of Anefif, which was abandoned by Mali. On May 24, clashes broke out in the nearby town of Tabankort, killing at least seven people, but the circumstances surrounding the clashes are unknown. The MNLA accused MOJWA of ambushing MNLA fighters, although French media reported the clashes were between pro-government and pro-rebel factions of the MAA. A few days later, new clashes broke out in Tabankort between the MNLA and pro-government MAA.

On July 11, clashes broke out in Anefis, with the MNLA, HCUA, and dissident MAA fighting against the loyalist MAA, GATIA, and CM-FPR. The pro-government side was led by El Hadj Ag Gamou, an Imghad Tuareg, and Yoro Ould Daha, a Lemhar Arab. Gamou commanded around 200 troops. Rebel fighters were led by Hassan Ag Fagaga. Rebel forces remained in control of the town.

== Battle ==
Clashes broke out again in Tabankort, particularly near Anefis and Bourem on July 19. The three main towns seeing fighting were Tabankort, Akaskaza, and Tabrichat. On July 21, MNLA fighters shot at camp of nomadic Arabs near Tabankort, killing one woman and injuring three others. The three injured were evacuated by MINUSMA. Both the rebels and pro-government militias claimed victory in the clashes near Tabankort on July 22, with the MNLA claiming that MINUSMA intervened just before the MNLA was planning to launch an offensive that would've pushed the loyalists out of their positions.

== Aftermath ==
The MNLA claimed that several dozen loyalist fighters were killed and injured, but did not give any specifics. Malian media reported several dozen deaths across both sides. One report in particular stated ten rebel fighters were killed and thirty-five were injured. Of those injured, twenty-five were serious. Loyalist fighters saw six killed and fifteen injured.

Fighting broke out again in Ersane, near Tabankort, on July 31. Several loyalists were reportedly killed in the clashes.
