= Susan McIntosh =

American anthropologist and archaeologist

Susan Keech McIntosh
- Education: Wellesley College; University of Pennsylvania (BA); University of Cambridge (MA); University of California, Santa Barbara (PhD)
- Scientific career
- Fields: Prehistory, African archaeology
- Workplaces: Rice University

Susan McIntosh is an American anthropologist and archaeologist and has been the Herbert S. Autrey Professor of Anthropology at Rice University since 2012. She is known for her work at Djenné-Djenno in Mali and for her advocacy against looting of cultural artifacts.

== Education ==
McIntosh began her undergraduate studies at Wellesley College and received her BA in anthropology from the University of Pennsylvania in 1973. After graduate studies at the University of Cambridge and University of California, Santa Barbara she received her MA and PhD, respectively. Her doctoral dissertation was based on field work at Djenné-Djenno in Mali.

== Career ==
McIntosh is the Herbert S. Autrey Professor Emerita of Anthropology at Rice University, where she taught since 1981. She has co-authored or edited archaeological monographs on field work 1980–2018 at the sites of Djenné-Djenno (Mali), Sincu Bara (Senegal), and Cubalel (Senegal). In 1999 President Bill Clinton appointed McIntosh to the Cultural Property Advisory Committee, on which she served until 2003. (The committee is a State Department body which oversees protection and preservation of cultural artifacts.)

McIntosh has a reputation as a proponent of heterarchy and for challenging Western intellectual biases. She is also known for her advocacy against the looting of cultural property in the name of archaeology.

From 2002 to 2004, McIntosh served as president of the Society of Africanist Archaeologists. She was nominated to be featured on Trowelblazers, a site that highlights important female archaeologists, for her contributions to the field in mentoring many Senegalese, Malian, Nigerian and Batswana archaeologists who have gone on to become prominent members of the field.

Early in her tenure as dean, McIntosh noted the value of former dean Lyn Ragsdale's mentorship. McIntosh presided over the 2020 opening of Kraft Hall, a 78,000-square-foot addition to the School of Social Sciences.

== Bibliography ==
- Archaeological Exploration in Terra Incognita: Excavations at Jénné-jeno (Mali), 1979
- Excavations at Jenné-jeno, Hambarketolo, and Kaniana (Inland Niger Delta, Mali), the 1981 Season, 1995
- The Way the Wind Blows, 2000
- Beyond Chiefdoms: Pathways to Complexity in Africa, 2005
- Archaeological Ethics, 2006
- The Search for Takrur: Archaeological Excavations and Reconnaissance along the Middle Senegal Valley, 2016
