= Haoussa Foulane =

- Village
- Location in Mali
- Coordinates: 15°59′42″N 0°07′55″E
- Country: Mali
- Region: Gao Region
- Cercle: Gao Cercle
- Commune: Gabero
- Time zone: UTC+0 (GMT)

Haoussa Foulane is a village and seat of the Commune of Gabero in the Cercle of Gao in the Gao Region of south-eastern Mali. The village lies on the left (east) bank of the Niger River and is 45 km south of Gao, on the road, the N17, linking Gao and Ansongo. As the name suggests, most of the people in the village are of Hausa or Fula descent.
