= Za Kusay =

15th King of the Gao Empire (fl. 1000s)

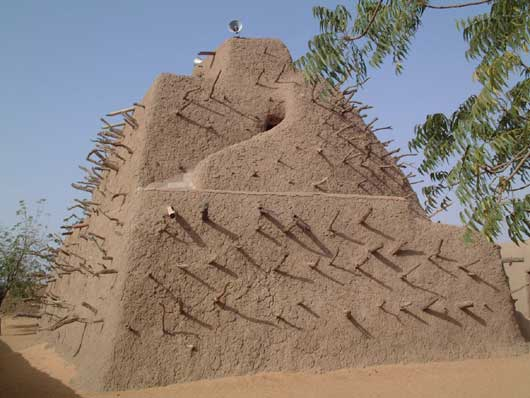
Mud built tomb of Askia in Gao.

Za Kusay/Kusoy also known as Muslim-dam (fl. 11th Century) was a Songhai king of the Gao Empire, who is known for converting to Islam in 1009 or 1010 CE. Za Kusay was the 15th ruler of the Gao Empire. It is possible that during his reign the capital of the Gao Empire moved from Kukiya to Gao, possibly because it was closer to caravan routes connecting the Sahel region.
