= Tine Aouker =

- Town
- Country: Mali
- Region: Gao Region
- Cercle: Gao Cercle
- Commune: Tilemsi
- Time zone: UTC+0 (GMT)

Tine Aouker is a small town and seat of the Commune of Tilemsi in the Cercle of Gao in the Gao Region of south-eastern Mali.
