= Tarkint attack (2021) =

Attack on Bundeswehr troops in Mali by Islamists

The attack in Tarkint occurred on June 25, 2021, in the village of Tarkint, Mali. It was the worst attack on German troops to date in Mali, injuring twelve soldiers from the Bundeswehr mission MINUSMA and one Belgian MINUSMA soldier, three seriously. The UN mission had initially spoken of 15 injured.

== Background ==
The UN MINUSMA mission, which has been running in Mali since 2013, has intervened in the Mali War in an attempt to push Islamist militias out of the country. Germany is one of the countries that chose (including France) to join the mission.

At the time of the attack, the Bundeswehr had around 1,000 soldiers stationed in Mali. Most of them served in MINUSMA and some in the European training mission EUTM. Since an effective containment of the terrorist threat had not succeeded by this time, the French President Emmanuel Macron announced in 2021 the largest foreign troops in the region, the French armed forces among others in the Opération Barkhane in Mali and the security strategy for the whole Rethink the Sahel region.

Despite the increasing risk in the deployment area, the Bundestag extended German participation in both MINUSMA missions to the end of May 2022 in a resolution in 2021. In the leadership of the Bundeswehr, the mission in Mali is rated as the most dangerous German mission abroad. Mali was politically unstable again in 2021 after two military coups, and the question arose whether the involvement of the Bundeswehr had also helped the coup leader Assimi Goita with training aids. Following language training in 2008, among other things, he took part in a course for company commanders in Germany.

== Incident ==
A UN force MINUSMA patrol in Mali was in the north of the country in Gao region. The mixed reconnaissance company of the German contingent, which also includes Irish and Belgian soldiers, was on a reconnaissance mission. The attack happened near the community of Tarkint, about 180 kilometers northeast of the provincial capital Gao.

At 6:18;a.m. local time on June 25, 2021, a suicide bomber in a pickup broke through the outer ring of a wagon castle built with the help of armored vehicles and detonated an explosive device. A tank truck was placed in this inner ring, which was parked 20 meters from the than exploded pickup. The tank truck didn't explode. Twelve German soldiers and one Belgian soldier from the MINUSMA mission were wounded as a result of the detonation. According to German Defense Minister Annegret Kramp-Karrenbauer, three of the injured were seriously wounded. The rescue chain was then triggered and the international forces involved in the mission were flown out by helicopter. The seriously injured were transported to neighboring Niger.

Six wounded soldiers were flown from Gao to Cologne on June 26, 2021, in an air force Airbus A400M equipped with intensive care equipment (StratAirMedEvac) for further medical treatment and transferred from there to the German Armed Forces Central Hospital in Koblenz. A second plane flew over Niamey, Niger, another six injured soldiers to Stuttgart. From there they were transferred to the Bundeswehr hospital in Ulm. Operations took place in both hospitals immediately upon arrival.
