= Gabero massacre =

- Part of Mali War
- Location: Dangabari, Gaina, and Boya, Gabero commune, Gao Region, Mali
- Date: June 27, 2023; 3/4pm
- Target: Civilians
- Deaths: 17+
- Injuries: 10+
- Victim: 6 kidnapped
- Perpetrator: Islamic State - Sahel Province

On June 27, 2023, militants from the Islamic State – Sahel Province (ISSP) massacred between 15 and 17 people in villages in Gabero, Gao Region, Mali.

== Background ==
The Islamic State's Sahel Province expanded into Gao Region following the Ménaka offensive in southeast Mali in 2022. Across the offensive, ISSP routinely targeted civilians and massacred hundreds of civilians in their rampage across Ménaka Region and into Gao Region. Men were primarily the targets, but women and children were killed as well.

== Massacre ==
Witnesses told Human Rights Watch that the massacre was in retaliation to several villagers from Boya beating to death an injured ISGS militant on June 21. On June 27, ISSP militants, some dressed in military fatigues and body armor, surrounded the villages of Dangabari, Gaina, and Boya in Gabero district at about 3 or 4pm. The militants blocked all passages in and out of the villages, and began going house to house to search for any men. Men found in the villages were rounded up or just shot in the streets as they fled.

Residents said that the victims were between the ages of 15 and 50. Human Rights Watch reported that nine men and two boys were killed in Dangabari and four men were killed in Gaina. A witness told Le Figaro that over 17 people were killed. Another toll, provided by the deputy mayor of Gabero Hamido Mohamed Bello, said that at least 17 were killed and six people were abducted. About ten people were wounded. Many were buried at people's houses or taken back to their home villages. Almost the entire population of young people in Gabero district fled after the massacre. The Islamic State looted some livestock, but many people chose to leave their livestock behind while fleeing.
