= Battles of Inabohane and Ebahlal =

- Part of Mali War
Date	April 29–30, 2014
Location	Inabohane and Ebahlal, Bourem Cercle, Mali
Result	MNLA victory

Belligerents
MNLA	al-Mourabitoun

Casualties and losses
4 killed 1 injured	7 killed 9 captured

Between April 29 and 30, 2014, clashes broke out between National Movement for the Liberation of Azawad (MNLA) fighters and Al-Mourabitoun in the villages of Inabohane and Ebahlal, near Bourem, Mali.

== Background ==
Clashes between Tuareg rebels of the MNLA and jihadists from al-Mourabitoun broke out in early April 2014. In late April, a shooting occurred in the Kel Hendek area of Kidal Region. MINUSMA also reported clashes near Tessalit.

== Battle ==
Fighting broke out on April 29 when MNLA and al-Mourabitoun fighters stumbled into each other in rural areas of Bourem Cercle. A battle first broke out in Inabohane, and ended on April 30 in Ebahlal. The MNLA reported that two to four rebels were killed and three were wounded compared to six or seven jihadists killed and nine taken prisoner. This was revised to four Tuareg rebels killed and one injured. They also stated that the prisoners were of Algerian, Malian Arab, and Tuareg descent.

While the Malian Army did not claim knowledge of the clashes, MINUSMA sources reported similar information to the MNLA.
