= 2020 Tarkint attack =

2020 terrorist attack

- Part of Mali War
Date	March 19, 2020
Location	Tarkint, Mali
Result	JNIM victory

Belligerents
Mali	Jama'at Nasr al-Islam wal Muslimin

Strength
Unknown	Several dozen

Casualties and losses
29 killed 5 wounded	Unknown

On March 19, dozens of Malian soldiers were killed at a military base in Tarkint in an attack perpetrated by the al-Qaeda linked Jama'at Nasr al-Islam wal Muslimin (JNIM).

== Attack ==
On the morning of March 19, 2020, several dozen JNIM militants raided the base, arriving from three directions and overwhelming the Malian troops stationed there. It was not immediately known which group caused the attack, but on March 21 JNIM claimed responsibility.

== Casualties and aftermath ==
Initially, the Malian army reported two dead and ten wounded, but these numbers soon rose to 29 soldiers killed and five wounded. An anonymous Malian military official claimed the death toll was closer to 30. The bodies were taken to Bourem.

There is little information regarding casualties of JNIM. In the statement claiming responsibility, the group claimed to have destroyed or captured stocks of weaponry from the base, corroborated by photos.
