= Wabaria =

- Town
- Location in Mali
- Coordinates: 16°11′35″N 0°2′10″W
- Country: Mali
- Region: Gao Region
- Cercle: Gao Cercle
- Commune: Gounzoureye
- Time zone: UTC+0 (GMT)

Wabaria is a small town and seat of the Commune of Gounzoureye in the Cercle of Gao in the Gao Region of south-eastern Mali.
