= Battle of Djebok =

Djebook Battle in the period of Mali war

Coordinates: 16.3500°N 0.3167°E

- Part of Northern Mali conflict
Date	12 – 15 March 2013
Location	Djebock, Gao Region, Mali
Result	Decisive French and Malian victory

Belligerents
France; Mali	Movement for Oneness and Jihad in West Africa

Strength
460 French; 200 Malians	Unknown

Casualties and losses
None	15–40 killed 8 pick-up trucks destroyed 1 motorcycle destroyed

The Battle of Djebok took place between an offshoot of Al-Qaeda, the Movement for Oneness and Jihad in West Africa against French and Malian armed forces in March 2013 in the area of Djebok, during the Mali war.

== The Battle ==
The French and Malian troops left Gao on 12 March 2013, heading to Zekouan. They arrived there by the evening and were beginning to search for militants. They found nothing, but when the night came, two pickup trucks came up with several Islamist fighters and attacked the French and Malians. After the two pickups were destroyed, the terrorists abandoned their attack and managed to retreat. After this clash, two other pickup trucks were spotted two kilometers away. The French and Malians attacked them, destroying one, but failed to destroy the other. The next day, the French began to search In Zekouan and discovered an improvised explosive device manufactured with a bomb plane. Shortly afterward, the Jihadists ambushed a group of soldiers. The soldiers manage to push back the Islamists, entering the woods. Then another group of soldiers was attacked. The French and Malian soldiers begun to retreat, but then bombarded the Jihadist's positions in the forest. In the night the fighting stopped and the French and Malians captured the area, but they found no bodies or traces of the Islamists.

On 14 March, north of Imenas, an aircraft located a pickup truck whose passengers were placing an improvised explosive device on the road ahead of the French and Malian column. Fighter planes and three helicopters were sent to the scene. They ambushed six pickup trucks in Torteuli, some filled with explosives. The helicopters opened fire, destroying all of the vehicles. The next day, the soldiers entered Torteuli but were attacked by fighters. After a brief exchange of fire, the Islamists fled into the wilderness.

The next day, French forces searched the in Zekouan again, but did not find anything suspicious. None was killed in the side of the French and Malians during the fighting, but the French estimated that about 15 to 40 Islamists were killed during the battle.
