= Djebock =

- Town
- Location in Mali
- Coordinates: 16°20′35″N 0°16′42″E
- Country: Mali
- Region: Gao Region
- Cercle: Gao Cercle
- Commune: Anchawadi
- Time zone: UTC+0 (GMT)

Djebock is a small town and seat of the Commune of Anchawadi in the Cercle of Gao in the Gao Region of south-eastern Mali.

This town is detached to Mauguio in France.

Between 12–17 March 2013, a battle took place around the town as part of the Northern Mali conflict. It resulted in a French-Malian victory over jihadists.
