= Koïma =

- Village
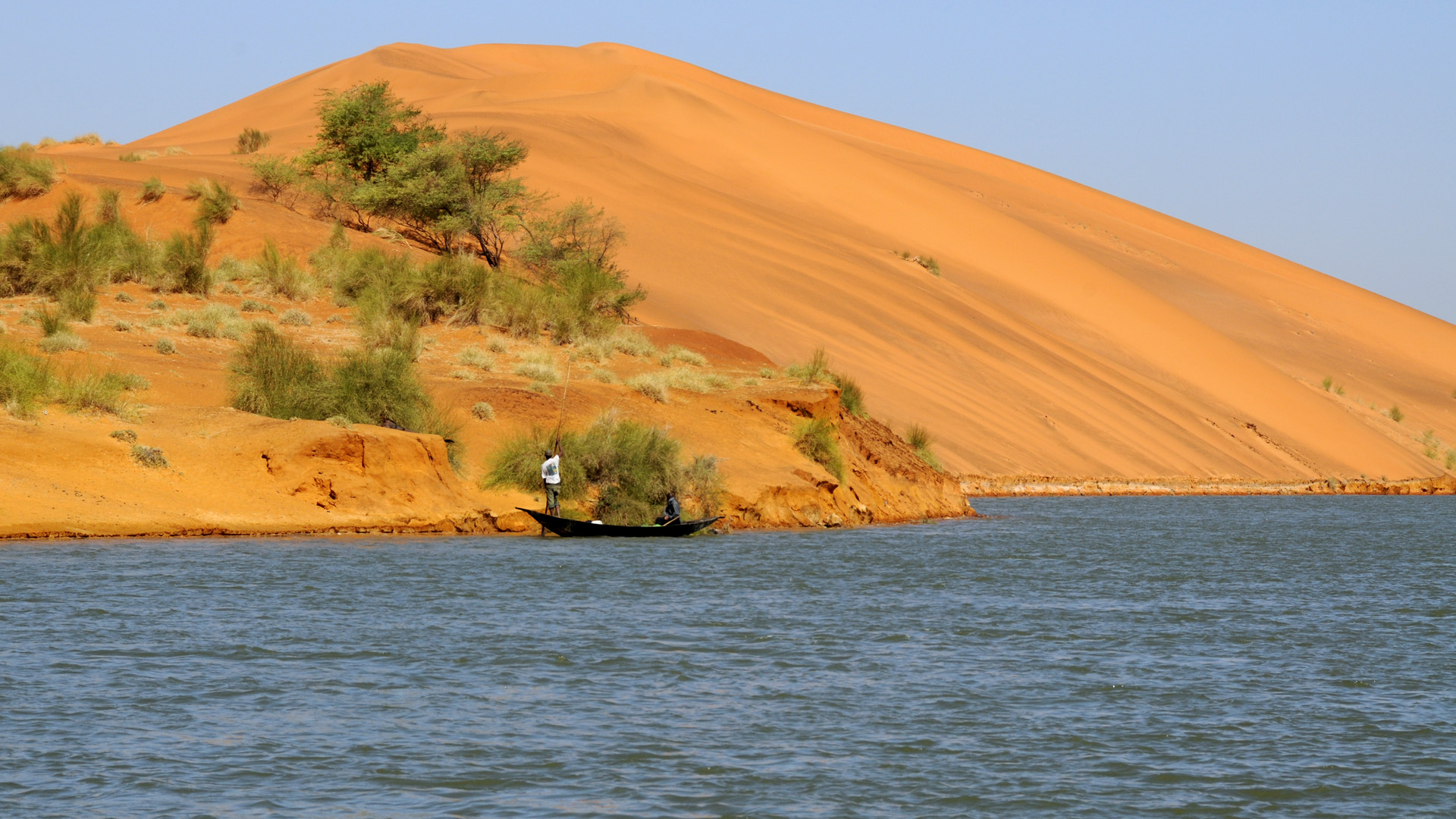

- Location in Mali
- Coordinates: 16°19′N 0°4′W
- Country: Mali
- Region: Gao Region
- Cercle: Gao Cercle
- Commune: Commune of Gao
- Time zone: UTC+0 (GMT)

Koïma is a village in the Commune of Gao in the Cercle of Gao in the Gao Region of south-eastern Mali. It lies on the Niger River.
