= Forgo Sourhai =

- Town
- Location in Mali
- Coordinates: 16°28′N 0°9′W
- Country: Mali
- Region: Gao Region
- Cercle: Gao Cercle
- Commune: Sony Aliber
- Time zone: UTC+0 (GMT)

Forgo Sourhai is a small town and seat of the Commune of Sony Aliber in the Cercle of Gao in the Gao Region of south-eastern Mali.
