= Temera =

Temera may refer to:

- Temera (fish), a genus of rays in the family Narkidae
- Temera, Mali
