= Tilemsi, Gao =

Coordinates: 16°15′03″N 0°12′21″W

Tilemsi
- Commune
- Interactive map of Tilemsi
- Country: Mali
- Region: Gao Region
- Cercle: Gao Cercle

Population (1998)
  - Total: 2,088
- Time zone: UTC+0 (GMT)

Tilemsi is a commune in the Cercle of Gao in the Gao Region of south-eastern Mali. The principal town lies at Tine Aouker. As of 1998 the commune had a population of 2,088.
