= Sony Aliber =

- Commune
- Location in Mali
- Coordinates: 16°30′25″N 0°4′28″W
- Country: Mali
- Region: Gao Region
- Cercle: Gao Cercle

Area
  - Total: 982.9 km^{2} (379.5 sq mi)

Population (2009)
  - Total: 44,099
  - Density: 44.87/km^{2} (116.2/sq mi)
- Time zone: UTC+0 (GMT)

Sony Aliber or Soni Ali Ber is a commune in the Cercle of Gao in the Gao Region of south-eastern Mali. The main villages are: Bagnadji, Batal, Berrah, Forgho Arma, Forgho Songhai, Kochakarey, Kokorom, Magnadoué, Seina and Zindiga. The administrative center (Chef-lieu) is the village of Forgo Sourhai which is located 25 km north of Gao. The commune includes the banks of the River Niger for a distance of around 35 km. In the 2009 census the commune had a population of 44,099.
