= Kissi, Burkina Faso =

Kissi
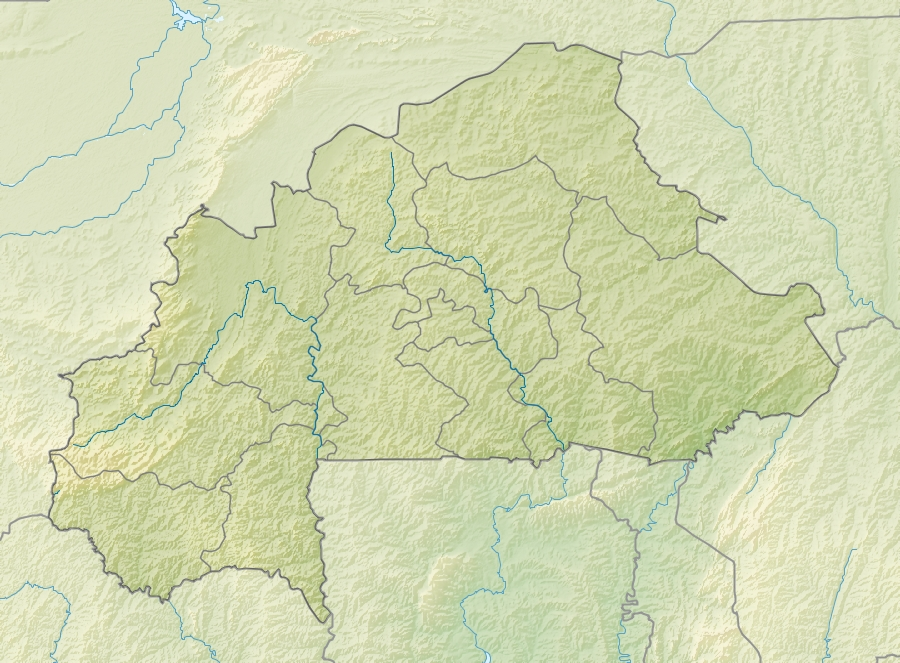
- location in Burkina Faso
- 14°38′31″N 0°9′47″W
- Location: Oudalan Province of Burkina Faso
- Region: Burkina Faso

Kissi is a Burkinabe archaeological site located in the Oudalan Province of Burkina Faso, near the lake Mare de Kissi and near the borders of Mali, Niger, and the Niger River. Occupied during the Iron Age, Kissi provides evidence for Iron Age textiles, beads, and mortuary practices. The site also has unique ceramic and settlement sequences to it, with clusters of mounds located throughout the site. Radiocarbon dating dates the specific occupation of the site from 1000 BC to 1300 AD.

== Cemeteries ==
The site's seven cemeteries cover approximately 400 hectares of land, and three have been partially excavated.

== Artifacts ==
Several of the cemeteries contained burials, which not only were characterized by the placement of stone slabs near them, but also contained various grave goods. Some of the grave goods include beads, iron tools, copper alloys, textiles, bracelets, anklets, snail shells, funerary jars, and even weaponry such as daggers. It is likely that the weaponry found indicated social status and were not used for fighting.

Analysis of the copper indicates that the metal was imported from Carthage in the Roman Empire, providing clear evidence for Trans-Saharan trade in the earliest centuries of the 1st millennium CE.

=== Beads ===
Beads, most commonly glass beads, were found in abundance throughout the site. In grave goods excavated at the site, over 5000 various types of beads were located. Beads found buried were noted to be more cylindrical in shape than other beads. The material for beads in graves include shell, jasper, and iron, but beads made out of glass were unique to this time period. Analysis of glass beads indicate that the glass itself may have actually been produced in Western Asia and later recycled by the people of Kissi. This also provides evidence that trade may have been established at Kissi with other nearby sites.

=== Textiles ===
Clothing primarily consisted of animal hair and wool, likely from sheep, dromedary, and camels. However, it is unknown if the material was from Kissi or imported from another nearby location. Spindle whorls and various types of yarn found at the site indicate that the textiles were made into a weft-faced plain weave pattern. Other textile evidence, such as combs, looms, and wool-bearing animals have not been found or excavated during the earliest occupation of Kissi, suggesting that weaving began during Kissi's later occupation. The textiles may have also had correlation to the social status of individuals at Kissi or even long distance trade, but no evidence has been discovered to truly prove this.

=== Iron smelting ===
There is also evidence that iron smelting was practiced at the site. While there were no furnace remains found, slag was found beneath stone around the site. Ceramics were found above the slag and likely tempered with various plants and sand.

=== Ceramics ===
Early occupation of the site only consisted of flat-rimmed ceramic bowls decorated by mat impressing. By 4th century AD, the flat-rimmed ceramic bowls began to decline in production, and instead, Kissi saw an increase in string roulette decoration. By the 9th century AD, the production of flasks and large decorated storage vessels became common.

== See also ==
- Dia, Mali
- Djenné-Djenno
- Tegdaoust
- Gao-Saney
- Kukiya, Mali
