= Hunwick (surname) =

Hunwick is a surname. Notable people with the surname include:

- John Hunwick (1936–2015), English writer and academic
- Matt Hunwick (born 1985), American ice hockey player
- Shawn Hunwick (born 1987), American ice hockey player, brother of Matt
