= Kukiya, Mali =

Ancient Songhai archaeological site

Kukiya
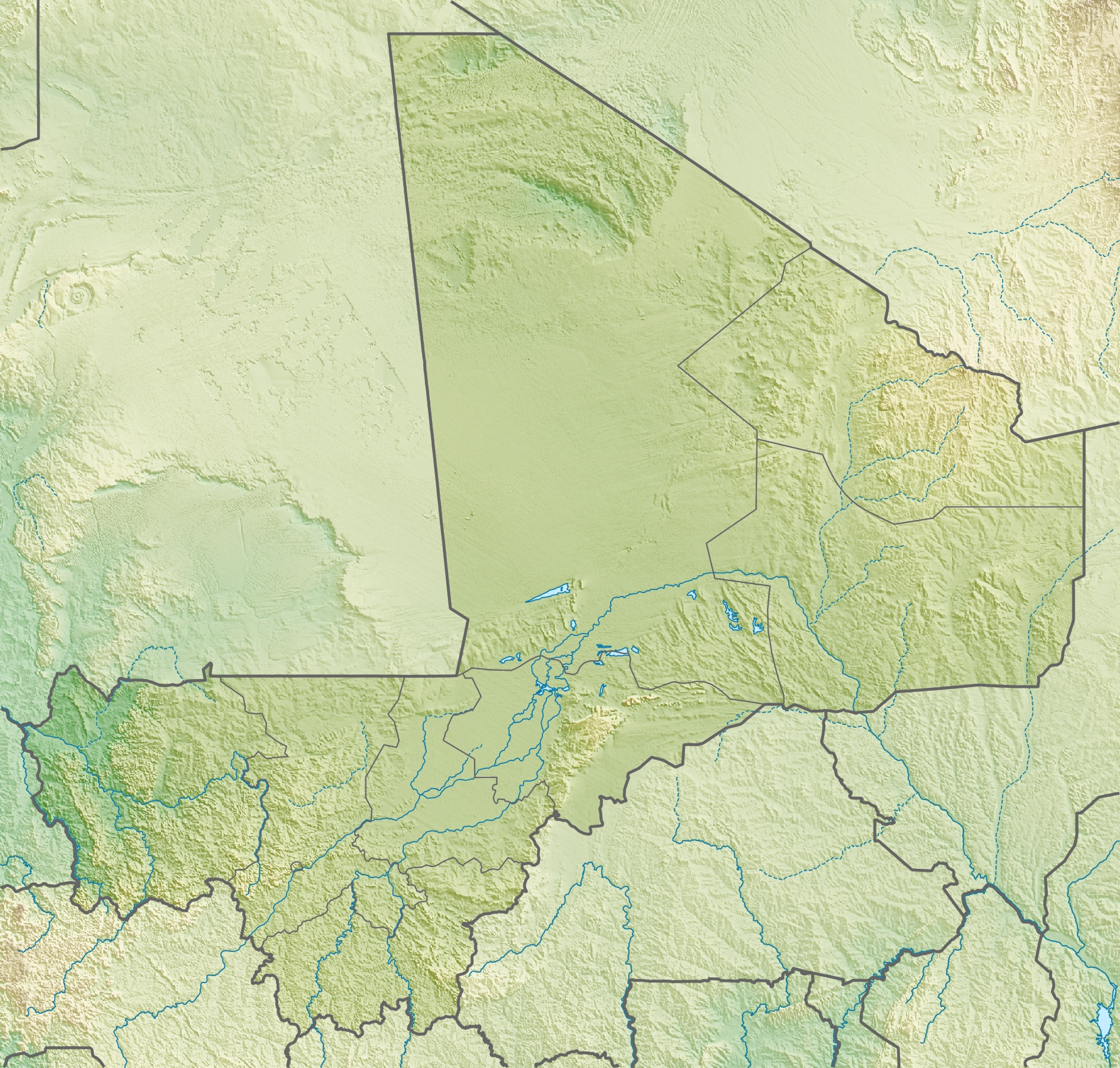
- Location within Mali
- 15°21′29″N 0°44′40″E
- Cultures: Gao Empire, Songhai Empire
- Location: Gao Region
- Region: Mali

Kukiya is an archaeological site and ancient city on the banks of the Niger River in present-day Mali. It was an early capital of the Songhai people, preceding the founding of the city of Gao. It is located on an island in the Niger River near the village of Bentia in the Ouattagouna commune.

The site has yet to be fully excavated, but the earliest occupation has been tentatively dated to the 2nd millennium BCE. The island dominates a stretch of river between two rapids, making it an important stopping point on Trans-Saharan trade routes linking Borgu, Hausaland, and other Sub-Saharan regions with North Africa.

Kukiya was for generations the seat of the Sunni dynasty before they captured Gao in the mid 15th century. Tarikh al-Sudan, a chronicle about the history of the Songhai Empire, describes Kukiya as "the center of paganism." Its Muslim settlement is evidenced by tombstones with Arabic inscriptions in the Bentia cemeteries, dated to the 13th–15th centuries. Similar tombstones have been found in Gao and nearby Gao-Saney. The political and commercial significance of Kukiya will be clarified in future archaeological investigations.

== See also ==
- Dia, Mali
- Djenné-Djenno
- Tegdaoust
- Gao-Saney
- Kissi, Burkina Faso
