= Tarkint =

- Commune and village
- Location in Mali
- Coordinates: 17°28′37.2″N 0°06′58.6″E
- Country: Mali
- Region: Gao Region
- Cercle: Bourem Cercle

Government
  - Type: Elected body
  - Mayor: Baba Ould Cheikh Sid’Elmoctar Alkounti

Area
  - Total: 23,000 km^{2} (8,900 sq mi)
- Elevation: 305 m (1,001 ft)

Population (2009 census)
  - Total: 19,082
  - Density: 0.83/km^{2} (2.1/sq mi)
- Time zone: UTC+0 (GMT)

Tarkint is a village and commune in the Cercle of Bourem in the Gao Region of north-eastern Mali. The village is 70 km (43 mi) northeast of Bourem and 123 km (76 mi) from Gao. Tarkint extends for 23,000 km^{2} and includes part of the Tilemsi Valley. In the 2009 census Tarkint had a population of 19,082.

== Cocaine Air ==
The sandblown village became notorious in 2009, when the burnt-out wreckage of an old Boeing 727 airliner was found abandoned in the desert, 85 miles north of Gao, at the scene of the so-called "Cocaine Air" incident. It is believed that the aircraft had been transporting up to 10 tons of cocaine.
