= Za dynasty =

Rulers of the Gao Empire

The Zā dynasty (also rendered Dya, Zuwā, Zu’a, Juwā, Jā’, Yā, Diā, and Diu’a, sometimes equated with the Zaghe) were rulers of the Gao Empire based in the towns of Kukiya and Gao on the Niger River in what is today modern Mali; and rulers of the Songhai Empire through Sunni Ali, son of Za Yasibaya (Yasiboi), who established the Sonni Dynasty. The Songhai people are among those descended from this kingdom and the Zarma people of Niger derive their name, which means "the descendants of Za", from this dynasty.

== Competing Interpretations ==
Al-Sadi's seventeenth century chronicle, the Tarikh al-Sudan, provides a history of the Songhay as handed down by oral tradition and Timbuktu Manuscripts, including the Za dynasty. The history handed down by al-Sadi portrays a single, stable dynasty that smoothly transitions from Za Yasiboi (Yasibay) to his son Sonni Ali. Paolo de Moraes Farias, however, has used epigraphic evidence from funerary stelae from Bentiya, Gao-Saney, and Tadmekka to show that reality was far more complex. The funerary stelae record the named and dates of kings, some of whom claim descent from an ancestor named Zaghe.

John Hunwick sees this Zaghe dynasty as a group of Sanhaja Berbers who took power in Gao-Saney during the height of the Almoravid movement, but were soon absorbed by the Za. Dierk Lange, in contrast, argues that 'Za' or 'Zuwa' was a title used by the rulers of the pre-Almoravid Qanda dynasty. The Zaghe were localized Berbers who formed a competing royal clan, but eventually adopted the title as well and some appear in the kinglists of the Tarikh al-Sudan. Ultimately, according to this interpretation, these Zaghe were the ancestors of the rival Sonni dynasty. The Zaghe may have been subordinate kings to the Za.

Historians agree that the kingdom was islamized by the late 10th century, although it may have been Ibadism and that Sunni Islam arrived only with the Almoravids. It seems clear that there was some sort of dynastic upheaval at that point, although how this affected the Za is unclear.

== Legend of Za al Yaman ==
The chronicle reports that the progenitor of the dynasty, Za al Yaman, the Yemenite (also called Alayaman or Dialliaman), originally came from the Yemen and settled in the town of Kukiya. Local traditions describe al-Yaman as a Berber Christian of Yahudim descent. The Chronicles state that Za al-Yaman came from Yemeni Jews who converted to Christianity and were transported by the Christian Kingdom of Axum in the sixth century from Zafar, Yemen, or the Himyarite Kingdom, due to persecution by Himyarite Jewish converts. Za al-Yaman and his brother were among the Jews of Bilad el-Sudan and they settled in the town and island of Kukiya, Niger River. The town is believed to have been near the modern village of Bentiya on the eastern bank of the Niger River, north of the Fafa rapids, 134 km south east of Gao. Tombstones with Arabic inscriptions dating from the 14th and 15th centuries have been found in the area. Kukiya is also mentioned in the other important chronicle, the Tarikh al-fattash.

Za Alyaman is almost certainly a mythical figure, but his legend may contain folk memories of the arrival of the Berbers.

== Rulers of the Za dynasty as given in the Tarikh al-Sudan ==
These names with their diacritics are as given in the translation by John Hunwick. The surviving Arabic manuscripts differ both in the spelling and the vocalization of the names.

1. Alayaman
2. Zakoi
3. Takoi
4. Ikoi
5. Kū
6. ʿAlī Fay
7. Biya Kumay
8. Bī/Bay
9. Karay
10. Yama Karaway
11. Yuma Dunku
12. Yuma Kībuʿu
13. Kūkura
14. Kinkin
15. Kusoy (the first Muslim ruler)
16. Kusur Dāri
17. Hin Kun Wunka Dum
18. Biyay Koi Kīma
19. Koy Kīmi
20. Nuntā Sanay
21. Biyay Kayna Kinba
22. Kayna Shinyunbu
23. Tib
24. Yama Dao
25. Fadazaw
26. ʿAlī Kur
27. Bēr Falaku
28. Yāsiboy
29. Dūru
30. Zunku Bāru
31. Bisi Bāru
32. Badā

== See also ==
- Mali Empire
- Songhai Empire
- Sonni dynasty
