= Gabero =

- Commune
- Location in Mali
- Coordinates: 15°59′42″N 0°7′55″E
- Country: Mali
- Region: Gao Region
- Cercle: Gao Cercle

Area
  - Total: 2,007 km^{2} (775 sq mi)

Population (2009 census)
  - Total: 25,688
  - Density: 12.80/km^{2} (33.15/sq mi)
- Time zone: UTC+0 (GMT)

Gabero is a rural commune in the Cercle of Gao in the Gao Region of south-eastern Mali. The commune covers an area of approximately 2,007 square kilometers and includes 15 villages. In the 2009 census the commune had a population of 25,688. The Niger River crosses the commune from north to south. The administrative center (chef-lieu) is Haoussa Foulane that lies on the left (east) bank of the Niger. The village is 45 km south of Gao, on the road, the N17, linking Gao and Ansongo.

The climate is sahelian, and is characterized by the alternation of two seasons: a long dry season (October to June) and a short wet season (July to September). The annual rainfall varies between 200 and 250 mm depending on the year.
