= Taboye =

- Commune and village
- Location in Mali
- Coordinates: 16°42′53″N 0°15′31″W
- Country: Mali
- Region: Gao Region
- Cercle: Bourem Cercle

Area
  - Total: 1,452 km^{2} (561 sq mi)

Population (2009 Census)
  - Total: 20,503
  - Density: 14.12/km^{2} (36.57/sq mi)
- Time zone: UTC+0 (GMT)

Taboye is a rural commune and village in the Cercle of Bourem in the Gao Region of south-eastern Mali. The commune is crossed by the River Niger and includes the villages of Bia, Dagha, Ha, Moudakane, Ouani, Tondibi and Taboye. In the 2009 census the commune had a population of 20,503.
