= Bamba, Gao Region =

Bamba
- Commune and town
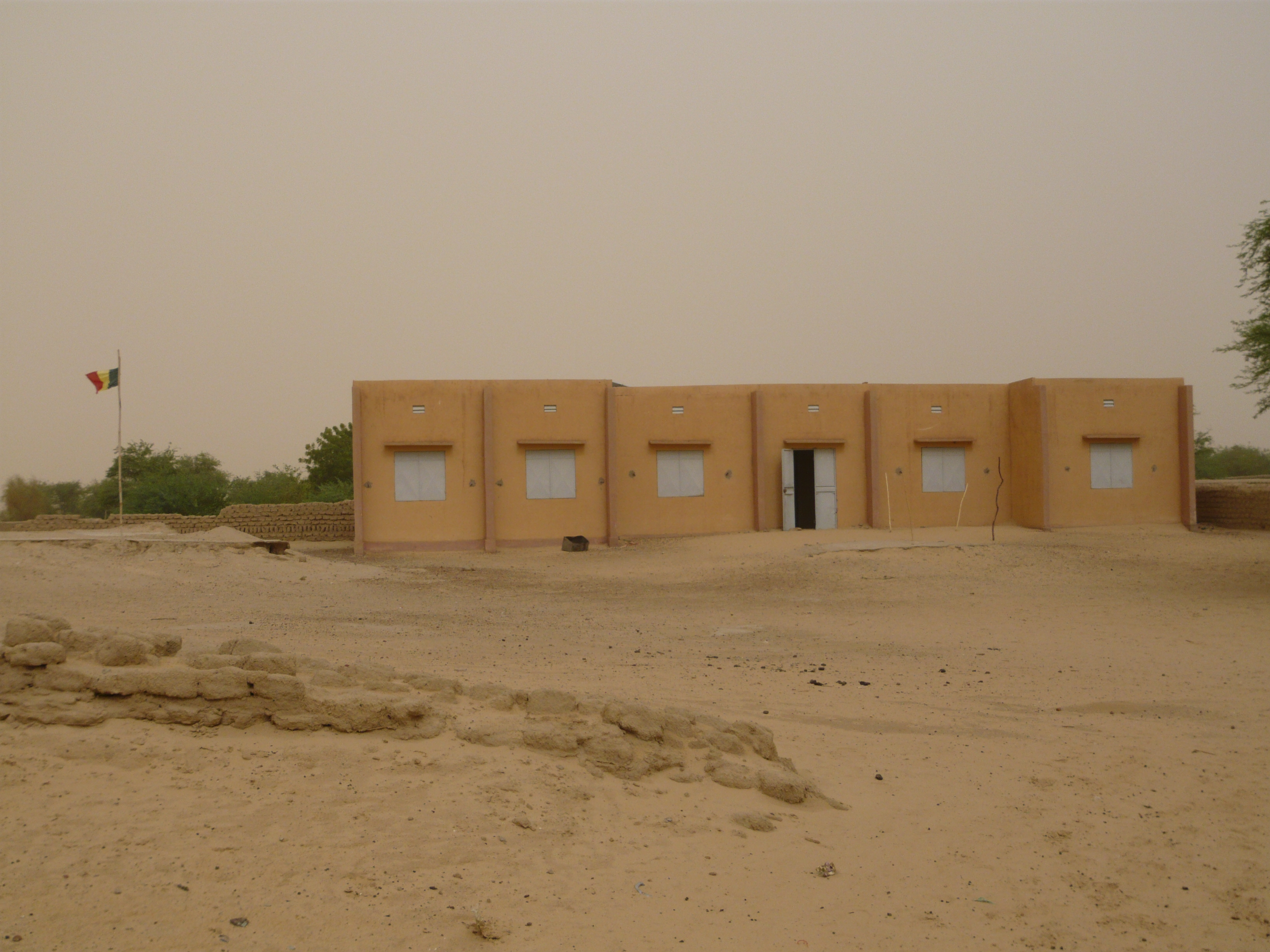
- Bamba town hall

- Location in Mali
- Coordinates: 17°02′N 1°24′W
- Country: Mali
- Region: Gao Region
- Cercle: Bourem Cercle

Area
  - Total: 4,776 km^{2} (1,844 sq mi)

Population (2009 Census)
  - Total: 28,524
  - Density: 5.972/km^{2} (15.47/sq mi)
- Time zone: UTC+0 (GMT)

Bamba is a small town and rural commune in the Bourem Cercle of the Gao Region of Mali. The town is located on the left (north) bank of the Niger River, 190 km east of Timbuktu and 230 km northwest of the town of Gao. In the 2009 census the commune had a population of 28,524.

The commune of Bamba includes 19 villages and 7 nomadic population groups. The population are primarily Songhais but also Tuaregs and Bozos.

Ted Joans wrote a poem to "Le fou de Bamba" (The madman of Bamba).

On 6 April 2020, at least 20 soldiers were killed in an attack on a military base.

On 1 October 2023, Tuareg rebels seized control of the town.
