= Gao-Saney =

Archaeological site near Gao, Mali

Coordinates: 16°15′03″N 0°00′11″W

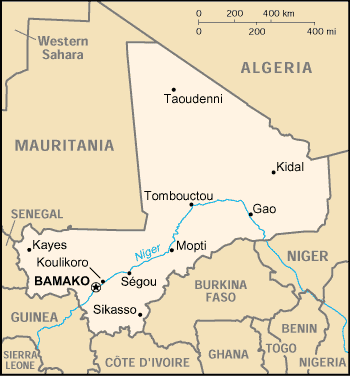
Map of current-day Mali including location of Gao empire

Gao-Saney, also spelled Gao-Sane, is an archaeological site near Gao in Mali. It was almost certainly the town known in historical accounts as Sarneh.

Gao-Saney is a large settlement mound seven km distant from the royal town of Gao, and is thought to be the site of the ancient trading center. The site has produced extensive archaeological evidence from its first millennium occupation, with proposed chronology between 700 and 1100 CE. In modern day, the Gao region is too dry to sustain year-round habitation without digging deep wells, leading to speculation about different climate conditions, perhaps with increased rainfall, at the time of Gao's first millennium occupation.

Gao-Saney excavations demonstrate involvement of the site in glass and copper trade networks during the eighth to tenth centuries on a scale only exceeded by Igbo-Ukwu among known sub-Saharan sites.

== History ==
Archaeological digs show that Gao-Saney was occupied by roughly 700CE, and was a center of manufacturing, iron smelting, and trade with areas as far away as Mesopotamia. It was the southern terminus of a trade route powered by chariots that linked it to the Mediterranean. At some point no later than the early 10th century the Songhay king moved to the site of Gao Ancien, just north of the modern city on the bank of the Niger river and a few kilometers from Gao Saney. The kings of this period were of a lineage known as Qanda.

Arabic sources from the 9th to 11th centuries frequently describe Gao as consisting of two towns. al-Idrisi, writing in around 1154, does not mention a second town, and archaeological excavations in Gao-Saney indicate the site may have beena abandoned by this time.

== Subsistence Economy & Production ==
=== Livestock ===
Gao Saney had a mixed millet, caprine, and cattle based subsitence economy. Goats and sheep were very populous, significantly outnumbering cattle, while camels appear only sometimes in the faunal assemblage, and were likely consumed and used for transport.

=== Copper ===
809 copper-based artifacts have been found, with almost half of them shaped as copper crescents. Given their consistent shape, it has been hypothesized that the copper crescents were used as currency, however, most of the copper artifacts found have been fragments, making it difficult to test this hypothesis.

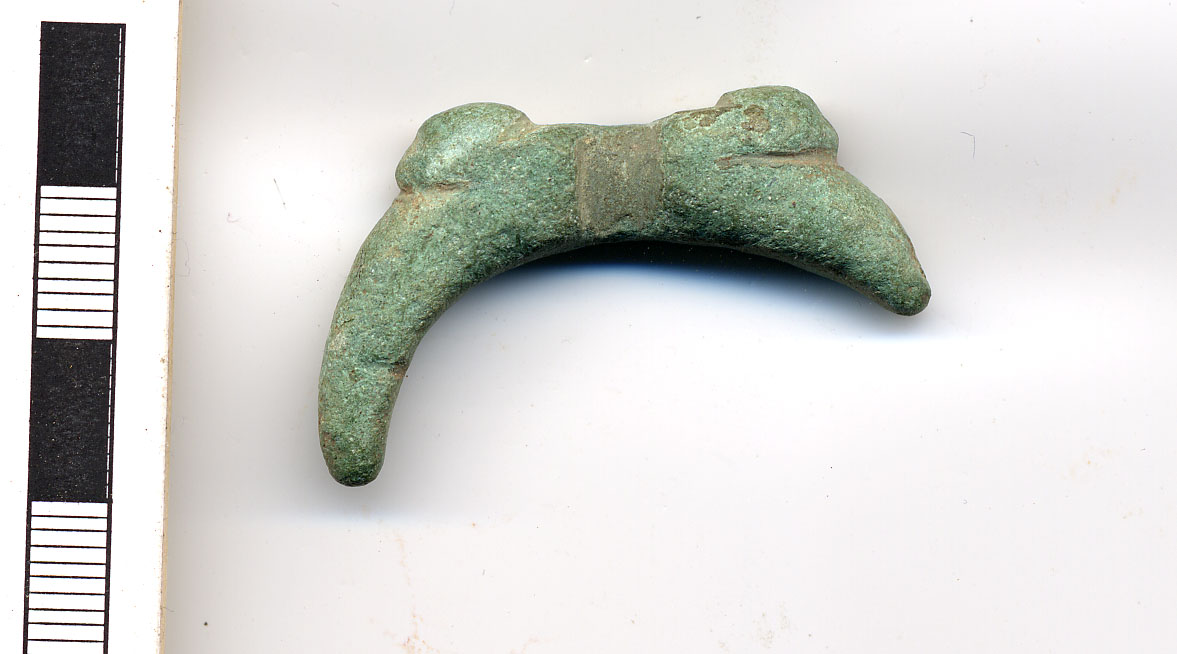
Example of copper artifact, not from Gao-Saney

=== Glass ===
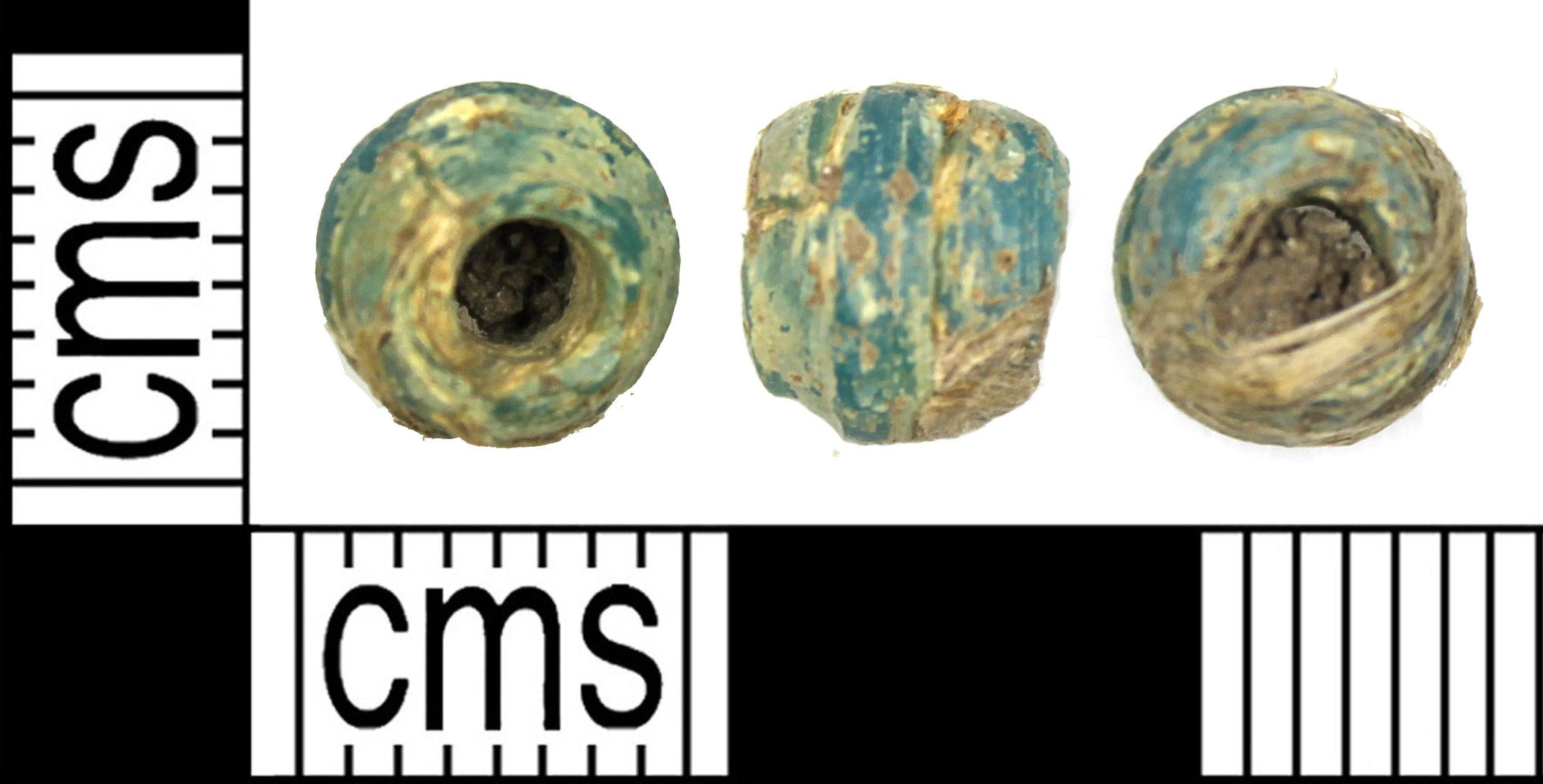
Example of early medieval bead, resembling those at Gao

Glass processing was among the earliest activities that took place. Thousands of glass beads have been found in and around Gao, dating from the eighth to the fourteenth century CE. Their shapes include cylinder, oblate, sphere, tube, ellipsoid, bicone, and disc, and colors range from red to blue to yellow. Analyzing the composition of the beads can indicate their origins; several compositional groupings have been recognized, included plant-ash soda-lime-silica glass, mineral soda-lime-silica glass, high-lime high-alumina glass, mineral soda-high alumina glass, plant ash soda-high alumina glass and a high lead composition glass. The dating of these different composites indicates that the source of the glass used to make the beads changed sometime during the end of the tenth century. Earlier glasses were probably produced in Iraq and Baghdad, and later glasses were produced in Egypt.

== Trade ==
Gao Saney participated in regional and long-distance trade, indicated by extensive glass compositions sourced in the Middle East, and non-local items such as carnelian, flint, and granite grinding stones.

Understanding how trade networks developed over time will require further research. However, at the moment, data indicates that the region surrounding Gao was involved in trade networks that moved imported glass and copper from distant sources, beginning by 400 CE. Excavations at Gao Saney show its involvement in the trade networks in the eighth through tenth centuries on a scale only exceeded by Igbo Ukwu among known sub-Saharan sites.

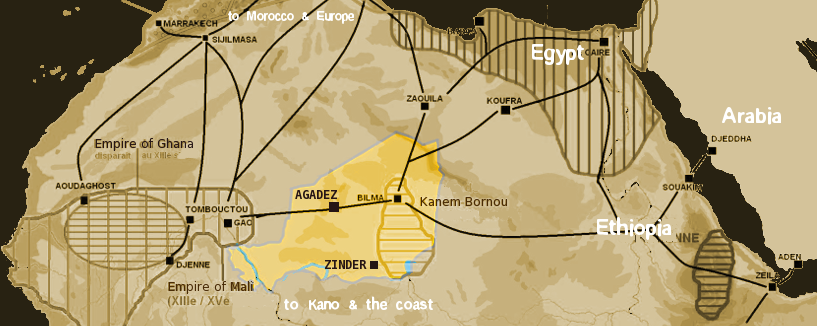
Trans-Saharan trade routes, featuring Gao.

Additionally, salt was noted as a large part of the king's treasure at Gao. Supposedly, Gao controlled an underground salt mine, however, salt is archaeologically invisible.

The number of imports exploded with the penetration of Islam into West Africa. During the late eight century CE, Ibadi merchants established the earliest recorded contact with Gao, corresponding to the same time that dry-stone architecture, wheat, and glass appear in the area. According to McIntosh, "throughout this period, the spread of Islam, literacy, a common language, and Sharia law contributed to increased efficiency, trust, financing, and security within more expansive trade networks."

== Material Culture ==
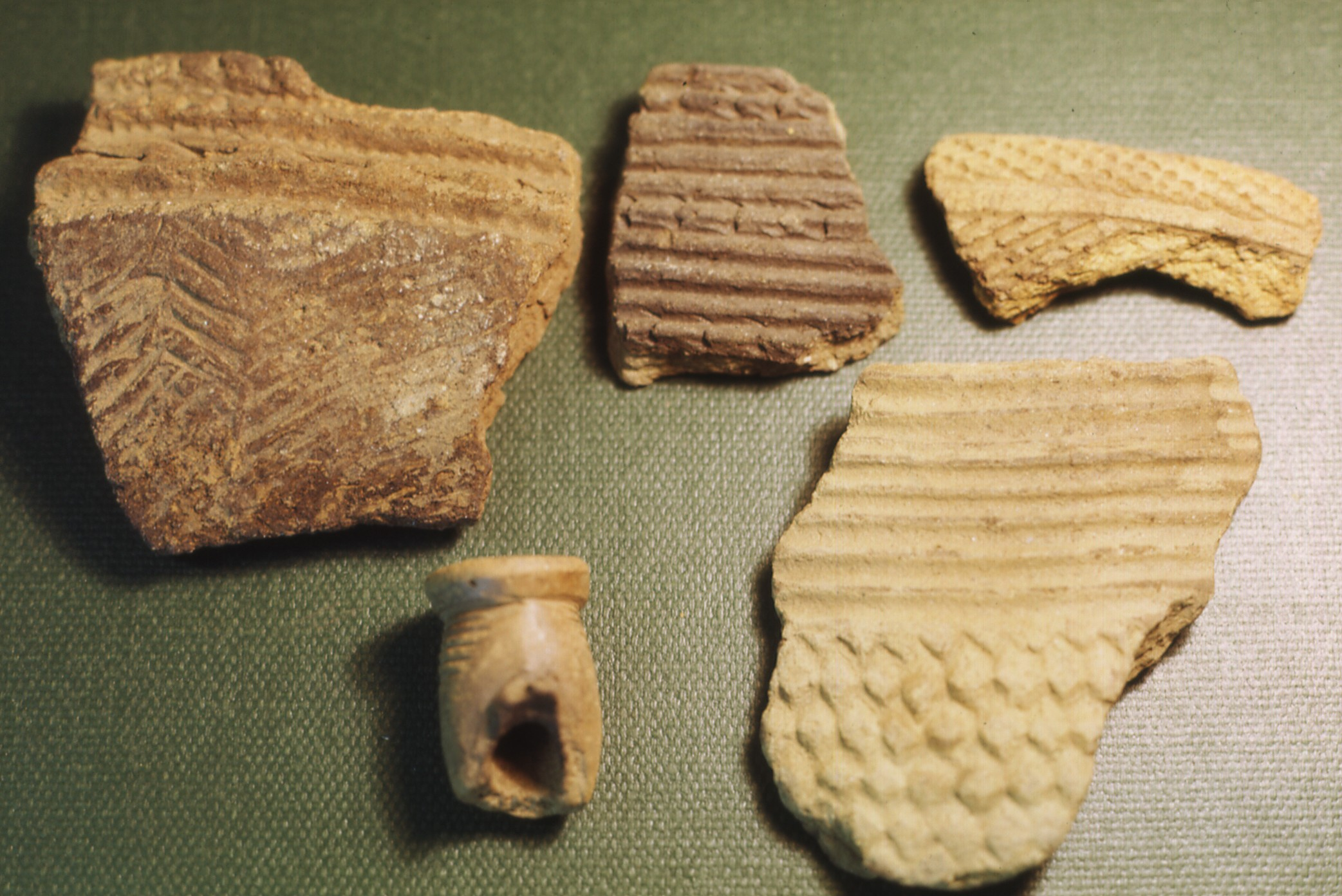
Example of pottery sherds from medieval West Africa, similar to those at Gao-Saney

The earliest material culture at Gao-Saney, including its pottery, suggest Songhai-Berber presence rather than Arabic. Historical evidence indicates that the king of Gao converted to Islam during the 10th century. Archaeologically, the cemetery stelae are the main evidence for Islam at Gao.

=== Pottery ===
An excavation of 5700 rim and body sherds showed Gao Saney's ceramic assemblage to be largely homogeneous throughout all the deposits. Most of the vessels were organic-tempered jars with long funnel-like rims decorated with broad channels, typically painted with a combination of white, black, and red paint. There were also small simple-rim bowls decorated with impressed comb in linear or geometric patterns. The presence of very similar pottery assemblages near places like Timbuktu, Gourma Rharous, and Bentia indicate river-based cultural interaction along the Middle Niger.

== Stelae ==
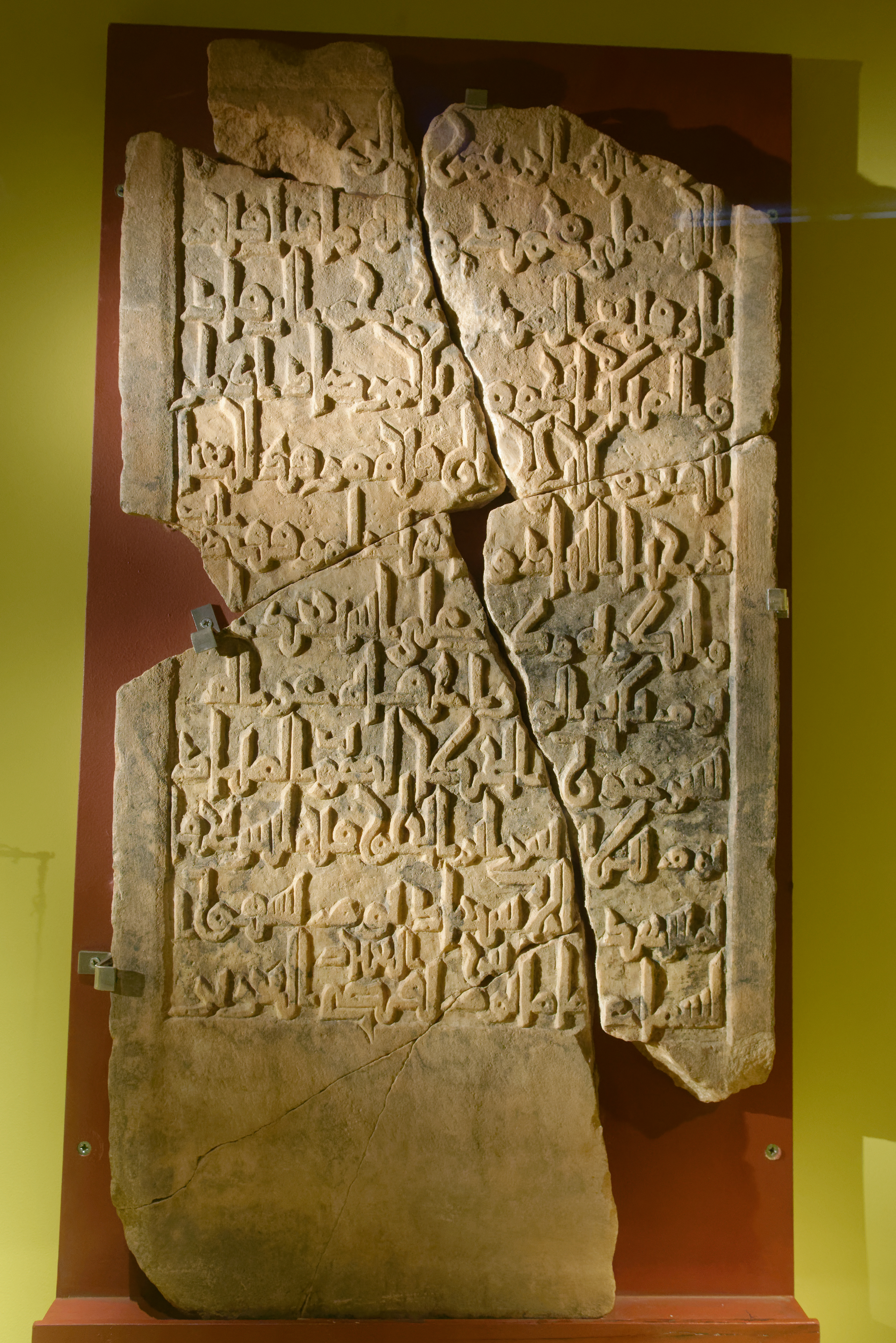
A stele found in Gao-Saney, now in the National Museum of Mali

Gao-Saney became well known among African historians when French administrators in 1939 discovered, in a cave covered with sand, several finely carved marble stelae produced in Almeria in Southern Spain. Their inscriptions attest to three kings of a Muslim dynasty bearing as loan names the names of Muhammad and his two successors. From the dates of their deaths it appears that these kings of Gao ruled at the end of the twelfth and the beginning of the thirteenth centuries CE, and represent a transition in leadership.

Historian Dierk Lange has argued that the Zaghe kings commemorated by the stelae, so-called because of multiple references to an ancestor of that name, are identical with some of the kings of the Za dynasty listed by the chroniclers of Timbuktu in the Ta'rikh al-Sudan and Ta'rikh al-Fattash. Their Islamic loan names are in one instance complemented by a local name, which has allowed the identification. Historians such as John Hunwick, however, have rejected this interpretation.

Kings of Gao-Saney (1100 to 1120 CE)
| Stelae of Gao-Saney | | Ta'rīkh al-fattāsh | Ta'rīkh al-sūdān |
| Kings of the Zāghē | Reign | Kings of the Zā | Kings of the Zā |
| Abū 'Abd Allāh Muhammad | c. 1080- 6 November 1100 | (16) Kotso-Dare | (16) Kusoy-Dare |
| Abū Bakr b. Quhāfa | November 1100-January 1110 | (17) Hizka-Zunku-Dam | (17) Hunabonua-Kodam |
| Umar b. al-Khattāb | January 1110-18 April 1120 | Yama bin Kima | Biyay Koi Kīma |

== See also ==
- Gao Empire
- Songhay Empire
