= Temera, Gao Region =

Temera Téméra
- Commune and town
- Location in Mali
- Coordinates: 17°0′0″N 0°57′15″W
- Country: Mali
- Region: Gao Region
- Cercle: Bourem Cercle

Population (2009 census)
  - Total: 20,363
- Time zone: UTC+0 (GMT)

Temera is a small town and commune on the north bank of the Niger River in the Cercle of Bourem in the Gao Region of south-eastern Mali. As of the 2009 census, the commune had a population of 20,363.
