= Anchawadi =

- Commune
- Location in Mali
- Coordinates: 16°20′38″N 0°16′40″E
- Country: Mali
- Region: Gao Region
- Cercle: Gao Cercle

Population (1998)
  - Total: 7,392
- Time zone: UTC+0 (GMT)

Anchawadi is a commune in the Cercle of Gao in the Gao Region of southeastern Mali. Its principal town is Djebock. In 1998 it had a population of 7392.
