= Gounzoureye =

- Commune
- Location in Mali
- Coordinates: 16°11′35″N 0°2′10″W
- Country: Mali
- Region: Gao Region
- Cercle: Gao Cercle
- Admin HQ (Chef-lieu): Wabaria

Population (2009 Census)
  - Total: 30,772
- Time zone: UTC+0 (GMT)

Gounzoureye is a rural commune in the Cercle of Gao in the Gao Region of south-eastern Mali. The commune includes the villages of Koima, Tchirissoro, Sadou, Lobou, Sidibé, Kosseye, Gorom Gorom, Kadji, Wabaria, Arhabou, Tacharane, Bagoundjé I and Bagoundjé II, which are all located on the banks of the River Niger. The administrative center (chef-lieu) is at the village of Wabaria. In the 2009 census the commune had a population of 30,772.
