= Gao Empire =

Country in west Africa, 8th–13th centuries

Gao
- c. 7th century–Late 1200s
- Status: Empire
- Capital: Gao
- Common languages: Songhai
- Religion: Islam, African traditional religion
- Historical era: Postclassical Era
  - Established: c. 7th century
  - Disestablished: Late 1200s
Succeeded by
Mali Empire; Songhai Empire
- Today part of: Mali

The Gao Empire was a Songhai-speaking Islamic kingdom that ruled the bend of the Niger River in Mali from approximately the 7th century CE until their fall to the Mali Empire in the late 14th century. Ruled by the Za dynasty from the capital of Gao, the empire was an important predecessor of the Songhai Empire.

== Historiography ==
There are over 100 medieval inscriptions in Arabic from Gao and nearby Gao-Saney, the oldest dating from 1042 CE. They contain poetry, and also provide contemporary primary-source documentation for many generations of kings and queens in the form of epitaphs.. This calls into question claims that there are no surviving indigenous written records that date from before the middle of the 17th century. Our knowledge of the early history of the town relies on the writings of Arab geographers living in Morocco, Egypt and Andalusia, most of whom never visited the region. These authors referred to the town as Kawkaw or Kuku. The earliest mention of Gao is by al-Khwārizmī who wrote in the first half of the 9th century.

The two 17th-century Songhai chronicles, the Tarikh al-Sudan and the Tarikh al-Fattash, provide information on the town at the time of the Songhai Empire but they contain only vague indications on the time prior to its writing. The chronicles do not, in general, acknowledge their sources. Their accounts for the earlier periods are almost certainly based on oral tradition, and they sometimes provide conflicting information. Using the epitaphs as a primary source, modern scholars increasingly question whether the chronicles, as biased political documents, are useful at all for describing the period of the Gao Empire.

Twentieth-century historians saw Gao as relatively unimportant compared with the roughly contemporary Ghana Empire, but the 2018 study African Dominion argued that Gao was West Africa's first city-state, providing a key model for the Ghana Empire and subsequently the Mali and Songhay empires, and that the Middle Niger region that it dominated was economically and politically interconnected with the Sahel, the Savannah, and the Middle East in ways that made it an important part of the world system.

== History ==
=== Founding and early history ===
Gao-Saney was founded in the 7th century at the southern terminus of a trans-Saharan trade route powered by chariots. The route was dominated by Ibadi Berber merchants, who settled there. The area was also an important center for the local fishing communities.

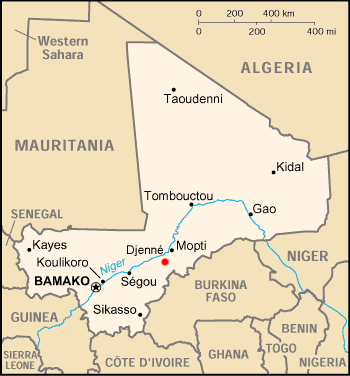
Map of Mali

Gao grew between the eighth and tenth centuries, becoming a regional power surpassing even Wagadu. Al-Yaʿqūbī wrote in his Tarikh in around 872:

There is the kingdom of the Kawkaw, which is the greatest of the realms of the Sūdān, the most important and most powerful. All the kingdoms obey its king. Al-Kawkaw is the name of the town. Besides this there are a number of kingdoms of which the rulers pay allegiance to him and acknowledge his sovereignty, although they are kings in their own lands.

The kings of the area belonged to a dynasty called the Qanda, and used the title 'Za'. They were likely originally based downstream in Kukiya before moving to Gao by the early 10th century. Their power was based in cavalry and camelry.

Ibn al-Faqih (writing c. 903) mentions a caravan route from Egypt to ancient Ghana via Kawkaw. but Ibn Hawqal (writing c. 988) states that the old route from Egypt to the Sudan was abandoned in the reign of the Egyptian ruler Ibn Tulun (ruled 868–884) as some of the caravans were attacked by bandits while others were overwhelmed by the wind-blown sand. The more direct route was replaced by one that went to Sijilmasa before heading south across the Sahara.

According to the Akhbar al-zaman, written during the late 10th or early 11th century, Gao was reportedly at war with the kingdom of the Dahdam towards the west.

=== Arrival of Islam ===
In the ninth century, al-Yaʿqūbī does not mention Islam in Gao, implying that the religion was not prominent there. Al-Muhallabī, who died in 990, wrote in a lost work quoted in the biographical dictionary compiled by Yaqut that

Their king pretends before his subject to be a Muslim and most of them pretend to be Muslims too. He has a town on the Nile [Niger], on the eastern bank, which is called Sarnāh, where there are markets and trading houses and to which there is continuous traffic from all parts. He has another town to the west of the Nile [Niger] where he and his men and those who have his confidence live. There is a mosque there where he prays but the communal prayer ground is between the two towns.

In Gomez's opinion, this suggests "a ruler who was only nominally Muslim (or may have embraced ‘Ibāḍism)". The Ta’rīkh as-sūdān's ruler-list has the ruler Kusuy-Muslim converting to Islam in 1009–10, and a 1068 report by al-Bakrī that Gao's kings were Muslim but most of their subjects at that time were not. Al-Sadi in his Tarikh al-Sudan gives a slightly later date for the introduction of Islam. He lists 32 rulers of the Zuwa dynasty and states that in 1009–1010 A.D. the 15th ruler, Zuwa Kusoy, was the first to convert to Islam.

=== Almoravids and a dynastic shift ===
The 11th century was an important inflection point in the history of the Gao Empire. By the middle decades of the century, the Almoravids had become a significant power in West Africa, spreading their interpretation of Sunni Islam. Al-Zuhrī then has Gao converting to Islam (perhaps meaning a shift from ‘Ibāḍism to Sunni orthodoxy) in 1083. This period also roughly coincides with the appearance of funeral epitaphs in Gao–Saney. These chronicle three Muslim rulers belonging to the Zaghe dynasty who died successively in 1100, 1110 and 1120.

This dynasty's role in the history of Gao is a topic of debate among scholars. Dierk Lange has argued that, although these Zaghe monarchs appear in the Za dynasty kinglists of the Tarikh, they were in fact a new royal clan either descended from resident Berbers influenced by the Almoravids or the royal family of Wagadu, taking refuge from their own conflict with the Almoravids. John Hunwick has argued that the Zaghe were Sanhaja immigrants, and that their short-lived dynasty was soon absorbed by the Za. The Zaghe married women from the previous royal line, and the queens of the time held significant political power and may have even been the head of matrilineal kin groups.

=== Decline and aftermath ===
Towards the end of the 13th century Gao lost its independence and became part of the expanding Mali Empire. What happened to the Zuwa rulers is not recorded. Archaeological evidence, however, shows that they likely took refuge downstream, as the architectural and epigraphic styles common in independent Gao up until the late 1200s continued to be used in Kukiya until the time of Sonni Ali (1464–1492). He greatly expanded the territory under Songhay control and established the Songhay Empire.

== Economy ==
Gao was one of the earliest sites of significant trans-Saharan trade in the 8th century, much earlier than scholars used to believe. The most important trade items were gold, copper, slaves, and salt. Gao was also a major manufacturing center. Craftspeople fashioned carnelian into beads, which are dated as early as the third century, and which were greatly valued in the Sudan and West African rainforest. Relative to its peers in Kanem and Wagadu, Gao was not a major center of the slave trade, although slavery was widely practiced domestically.

== Capital ==
The archaeological evidence suggests that there were two settlements on the eastern bank of the Niger: Old Gao situated within the modern town, to the east of the Tomb of Askia, and the archaeological site of Gao-Saney (Sané in French) situated around 4 kilometres to the east. The bed of the Wadi Gangaber passes to the south of the Gao-Saney occupation mound (tell) but to the north of Gao Ancien. The imported pottery and glass recovered from Gao–Saney suggest that the site was occupied between the 8th and 12th centuries. It is likely that Gao-Saney corresponds to Sarnāh of al-Muhallabi. Al-Bakri writing in 1068 also records the existence of two towns, but al-Idrisi writing in around 1154 does not. Both al-Muhallabi (see quote above) and al-Bakri situate Gao on the west (or right bank) of the Niger. The 17th century Tarikh al-Fattash also states that in the 10th century Gao was situated on the Gourma side (i.e. the west bank) of the river. A large sand dune, La Dune Rose, lies on the west bank opposite Gao, but at Koima, on the edge of the dune at a site 4 km north of Gao, surface deposits indicate a pre 9th century settlement. This could be the west bank Gao mentioned by 10th and 11th century authors, as the site has not been excavated. The chroniclers may also have been mistaken, and Wadi Gangaber could be the river they said divided the two towns. Archaeological digs have determined that Gao Ancien was the political center, containing the oldest royal palace discovered in the region.

== Language ==
The people of the Gao Empire spoke Songay, a language belonging to the Saharo-Sahelian branch of the Nile-Saharan Family. The language was originally brought into the region along the great Bend of the Niger as early as the sixth millennium BCE.

== Bibliography ==
- Cissé, M.; et al. (2013). "Excavations at Gao Saney: New Evidence for Settlement Growth, Trade, and Interaction on the Niger Bend in the First Millennium CE". Journal of African Archaeology. 11 (1): 9–37. doi:10.3213/2191-5784-10233.
- Conrad, David (2005). "Review of Arabic Medieval Inscriptions from the Republic of Mali: Epigraphy, Chronicles, and Songhay-Tuareg History, by P. F. de Moraes Farias". The International Journal of African Historical Studies. 38 (1): 105–112. JSTOR 40036465.
- Gomez, Michael (2018). African dominion: a new history of empire in early and medieval West Africa. Princeton, NJ: Princeton University Press. ISBN 9780691177427.
- Hunwick, John (1980). "Gao and the Almoravids: a hypothesis". In Swartz, B.; Dumett, R. (eds.). West African Culture Dynamics. The Hague. pp. 413–430. ISBN 90-279-7920-0.
- Hunwick, John (1994), "Gao and the Almoravids revisited: ethnicity, political change and the limits of interpretation", Journal of African History, 35 (2): 251–273, doi:10.1017/s0021853700026426, JSTOR 183219, S2CID 153794361.
- —— (2003). Timbuktu and the Songhay Empire: Al-Sadi's Tarikh al-Sudan down to 1613 and other contemporary documents. Leiden: Brill. ISBN 90-04-12822-0.
- Insoll, Timothy (1997). "Iron age Gao: an archaeological contribution". Journal of African History. 38 (1): 1–30. doi:10.1017/s0021853796006822. JSTOR 182944. S2CID 163151474.
- Kâti, Mahmoûd Kâti ben el-Hâdj el-Motaouakkel (1913). Tarikh el-fettach ou Chronique du chercheur, pour servir à l'histoire des villes, des armées et des principaux personnages du Tekrour (in French). Houdas, O., Delafosse, M. ed. and trans. Paris: Ernest Leroux.. Also available from Aluka but requires subscription.
- Lange, Dierk (1991). "Les rois de Gao-Sané et les Almoravides". Journal of African History (in French). 32 (2): 251–275. doi:10.1017/s002185370002572x. JSTOR 182617. S2CID 162674956.
- Lange, Dierk (1996). "La Chute De La Dynastie Des Sisse: Considerations Sur La Dislocation De L'Empire Du Ghana A Partir De L'Histoire De Gao". History in Africa (in French). 23: 155–78. doi:10.2307/3171939. JSTOR 3171939.
- Levtzion, Nehemia (1973), Ancient Ghana and Mali, London: Methuen, ISBN 0-8419-0431-6.
- Levtzion, Nehemia; Hopkins, John F.P., eds. (2000). Corpus of Early Arabic Sources for West Africa. New York, NY: Marcus Weiner Press. ISBN 1-55876-241-8.
- Sauvaget, Jean (1950). "Les épitaphes royales de Gao". Bulletin de l'IFAN. series B. 12: 418–440.
- Takezawa, Shoichiro; Cisse, Mamadou (2012). "Discovery of the Earliest Royal Palace in Gao and Its Implications for the History of West Africa". Cahiers d'Études Africaines. 52 (208): 813–44. doi:10.4000/etudesafricaines.17167. JSTOR 41708210.
