= Gao =

Urban commune and town in Gao Region, Mali

Gao Gaawo (Koyraboro Senni Songhai)
- Urban commune and town
- Gawgaw
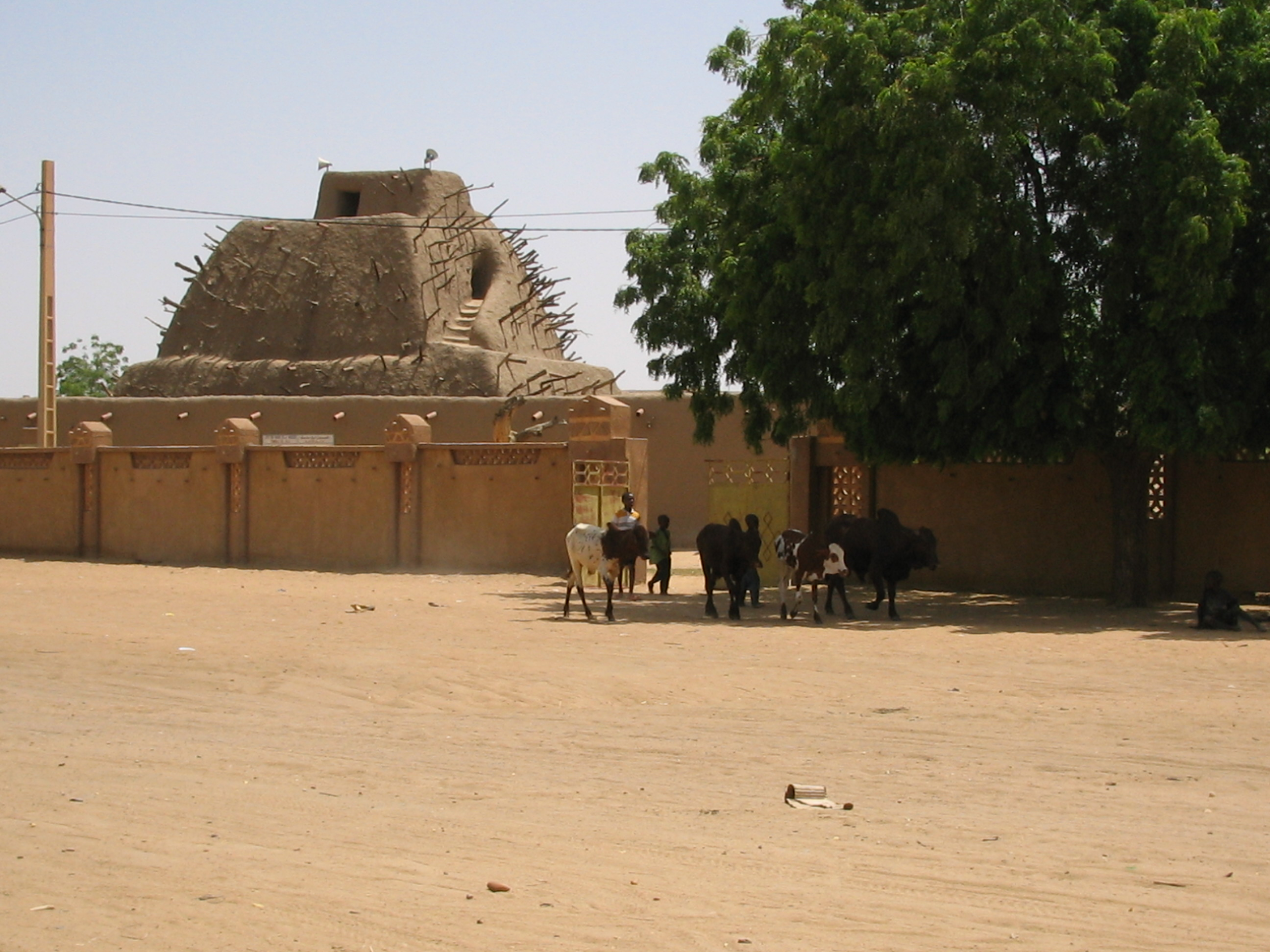
- Tomb of Askia in 2006

- Location within Mali
- Coordinates: 16°16′N 0°03′W
- Country: Mali
- Region: Gao
- Cercle: Gao Cercle
- Founded: 7th Century CE

Government
  - Control: Mali; Jama'at Nusrat al-Islam wal-Muslimin
- Elevation: 226 m (741 ft)

Population (2023)
  - Total: 141,929
- Time zone: UTC+0 (GMT)

Gao /ɡaʊ/ (or Gawgaw/Kawkaw) is a city in Mali and the capital of the Gao Region. The city is located on the River Niger, 320 km (200 mi) east-southeast of Timbuktu on the left bank at the junction with the Tilemsi valley.

For much of its history, Gao was an important commercial centre involved in the trans-Saharan trade. In the 9th century external Arabic writers described Gao as an important regional power, and by the end of the 10th century, the local ruler was said to be a Muslim. Towards the end of the 13th century, Gao became part of the Mali Empire.

In the first half of the 15th century the town regained its independence. With the conquests of Sunni Ali (ruled 1464–1492) it became the capital of the Songhai Empire. The Empire collapsed after the Moroccan invasion in 1591, and the invaders chose to make Timbuktu their capital.

By the time of Heinrich Barth's visit in 1854, Gao had declined to become an impoverished village with 300 huts constructed from matting. In 2009, the urban commune had a population of 86,633.

In 2012, Gao was captured from Malian government forces by National Movement for the Liberation of Azawad (MNLA) and Ansar Dine rebels. After additional captures of Kidal and Timbuktu, the MNLA declared the region independent of Mali as the nation of Azawad and named Gao its capital. The MNLA lost control to Islamist militias after the Battle of Gao in June 2012, with the city being recaptured by French military forces as part of Opération Serval in early 2013.

== Geography ==
=== Location ===
Gao is located on the eastern bank of the Niger River at the junction with the Tilemsi Valley. The sprawling town is the largest in eastern Mali. It is connected to the capital, Bamako at the western end of Mali, by 1200 km (750 mi) of paved road. In 2006, the Wabaria bridge was opened to replace the ferry service across the Niger. The bridge was constructed by the China State Construction Engineering Corporation and financed by the Islamic Development Bank and the Malian government.

The town is located with road links (unpaved) to the desert Kidal Region to the north and to Niamey, the capital of Niger, to the south. The road to the south runs along the left bank of the river. The town of Ansongo is 103 km (65 mi) from Gao. The border with Niger is just south of the village of Labbézanga, a distance of 204 km (127 mi). The prime meridian marker runs right through Gao, Mali.

There are also seasonal ferry services on the Niger River. A service between Gao and Koulikoro, a distance of 1380 km (860 mi), is managed by the Compagnie Malienne de Navigation (COMANAV). It usually operates from the end of July, after the annual rains when there is sufficient water in the river, until mid November. Smaller boats are able to operate for a longer season between Bourem and Ansongo.

In the 1998 census, the population of the urban commune was 52,201. By the census in 2009 this had increased to 86,633, a 4.7% annual growth rate. For administrative purposes, the commune is divided into nine quartiers: Gadeye, Farandjiré, Aljanabanbia, Djoulabougou, Saneye, Sosso Koïra, Boulgoundjé, Château, and Djidara. The urban commune is bounded to the north by the commune of Soni Ali Ber, to the east by the commune of Anchawadi and to the south and west by the commune of Gounzoureye.

=== Climate ===
Gao features an arid climate (BWh) under Köppen's climate classification. Gao's climate is hot and dry, with the only rainfall occurring between June and September. August is normally the wettest month. The average annual rainfall is only 220 mm, but there are large year-to-year variations. May is the hottest month, with an average daily high temperature of 43 °C. December and January are the coolest months, with daily low temperatures of 15 °C. From October to March during the dry period, the north-easterly Harmattan wind blows from the Sahara.

With the low rainfall, the vegetation further away from the river is sparse and consists mainly of various species of Acacia (Acacia raddiana, Acacia nilotica, Acacia ehrenbergiana) and Balanites aegyptiaca. The herbaceous plants are dominated by Cenchrus biflorus and Panicum laetum.

Climate data for Gao, Mali (1950–2000)
Month	Jan	Feb	Mar	Apr	May	Jun	Jul	Aug	Sep	Oct	Nov	Dec	Year
Mean daily maximum °C (°F)	30.8 (87.4)	33.8 (92.8)	37.2 (99.0)	40.7 (105.3)	42.5 (108.5)	41.5 (106.7)	38.5 (101.3)	36.6 (97.9)	38.4 (101.1)	39.3 (102.7)	35.8 (96.4)	31.4 (88.5)	37.2 (99.0)
Mean daily minimum °C (°F)	14.8 (58.6)	17.0 (62.6)	20.8 (69.4)	24.7 (76.5)	28.2 (82.8)	28.8 (83.8)	26.6 (79.9)	25.4 (77.7)	26.0 (78.8)	24.9 (76.8)	19.9 (67.8)	15.8 (60.4)	22.7 (72.9)
Average rainfall mm (inches)	0.0 (0.0)	0.1 (0.00)	0.3 (0.01)	1.7 (0.07)	7.7 (0.30)	22.8 (0.90)	63.6 (2.50)	84.2 (3.31)	33.5 (1.32)	4.8 (0.19)	0.0 (0.0)	0.1 (0.00)	218.8 (8.61)
Average rainy days (≥ 0.1 mm)	0.1	0.1	0.3	0.3	1.3	3.9	7.9	8.4	5.2	0.9	0.0	0.1	28.5
Mean monthly sunshine hours	269.8	257.9	269.6	254.2	274.9	227.1	249.7	251.5	253.5	279.8	280.8	261.9	3,130.7
Source 1: World Meteorological Organization
Source 2: NOAA (sun 1961–1990)

=== Annual flood of the Niger River ===
Almost all the local agriculture depends on river water for irrigation. The annual flood of the Niger River is a result of the heavy rainfall in the headwaters of the Niger and Bani rivers in Guinea and the northern Ivory Coast. The rainfall in the headwater areas peaks in August but the flood water takes time to pass down the river system, through the Inner Niger Delta region and arrive at Gao. At Koulikoro the flood peaks in September, while in Gao the flood lasts longer and reaches a maximum in December. There is a large year-to-year variation in the extent of the flooding. The existing and proposed dams upstream of Gao reduce the overall flow of the river and could potentially have a large effect on the local agriculture. When in flood the river is 4 km wide at Gao but during the dry season a number of islands appear in the river. There is very little flow, only 5% of the maximum, in June and July.

== History ==
=== Historiography ===
The history of the Gao Empire precedes that of the Songhai Empire in the region of the Middle Niger. Both empires had the town of Gao as their capital. There are over 100 medieval inscriptions in Arabic from Gao and nearby Gao-Saney, the oldest dating from 1042 CE. They contain poetry, and also provide contemporary primary-source documentation for many generations of kings and queens in the form of epitaphs. Another written primary source is a letter from Askia Muhammad I, quoted extensively in al-Maghili's (d. 1505 CE) response to the letter. This includes many details about 15th-century social and economic history, such as information about inheritance, pre-Islamic religious practices, and gender relations between men and women. These sources call into question claims that there are no surviving indigenous written records that date from before the middle of the 17th century. Our knowledge of the early history of the town relies on the writings of Arabic geographers living in Morocco, Egypt and Andalusia, most of whom never visited the region. These authors referred to the town as Kawkaw or Kuku. The two key 17th century chronicles, the Tarikh al-Sudan and the Tarikh al-fattash, provide information on the town at the time of the Songhai Empire but contain relatively little on the social and economic history. The chronicles do not, in general, acknowledge their sources. Their accounts for the earlier periods are almost certainly based on oral tradition and for events before the second half of the 15th century they are likely to be less reliable. For these earlier periods, the two chronicles sometimes provide conflicting information.

=== Gao Empire ===
There is clear archaeological evidence that Gao was firmly rooted in both its local hinterland and interregional economic networks. Pottery recovered from all levels in both mounds is generally quite similar to examples from sites throughout the region, indicating that Gao was part of a regional market sphere, if not a broader cultural substrate.

Gao thus represents a form of urbanism driven largely by local urban-rural dynamics, but in a way in which local elites capitalized on and, in fact, co-opted the opportunities offered by long-distance trade.

Midden deposits produced large quantities of household debris (animal bones, pottery shards, glass, glass beads, and a variety of copper and iron objects). Collectively, the local character of the ceramic, faunal, and botanical remains suggests that, culturally, Gao-Saney was part of a broader Niger River indigenous cultural complex. Additionally, fragments of North African enamel ware, Andalusian chandelier ware, and fragments of Islamic glass vessels were recovered throughout the excavations at Gao.

Archaeological digs in Gao-Saney show that the site was occupied by roughly 700CE, and was a center of manufacturing, iron smelting, and trade with areas as far away as Mesopotamia. It was the southern terminus of a trade route powered by chariots that linked it to the Mediterranean. At some point no later than the early 10th century the Songhay king based in Kukiya moved to the site of Gao Ancien, just north of the modern city on the bank of the Niger river and a few kilometers from Gao Saney further inland. The kings of this period were of a lineage known as Qanda.

The earliest written mention of Gao is by al-Khwārizmī, who wrote in the first half of the 9th century, when Gao was already an important regional power,. Al-Yaqubi wrote in his Tarikh in around 872:

There is the kingdom of the Kawkaw, which is the greatest of the realms of the Sūdān, the most important and most powerful. All the kingdoms obey its king. Al-Kawkaw is the name of the town. Besides this there are a number of kingdoms of which the rulers pay allegiance to him and acknowledge his sovereignty, although they are kings in their own lands.

Ibn al-Faqih (writing c. 903) mentions a caravan route from Egypt to ancient Ghana via Kawkaw, but Ibn Hawqal (writing c. 988) states that the old route from Egypt to the Sudan was abandoned in the reign of the Egyptian ruler Ibn Tulun (ruled 868–884) as some of the caravans were attacked by bandits while others were overwhelmed by the wind-blown sand. The more direct route was replaced by one that went to Sijilmasa before heading south across the Sahara. In the 10th century, Gao was already Muslim and was described as consisting of two separate towns. Al-Muhallabi, who died in 990, wrote in a lost work quoted in the biographical dictionary compiled by Yaqut:

Their king pretends before his subject to be a Muslim and most of them pretend to be Muslims too. He has a town on the Nile [Niger], on the eastern bank, which is called Sarnāh, where there are markets and trading houses and to which there is continuous traffic from all parts. He has another town to the west of the Nile [Niger] where he and his men and those who have his confidence live. There is a mosque there where he prays but the communal prayer ground is between the two towns.

Tomb of Askia
UNESCO World Heritage Site
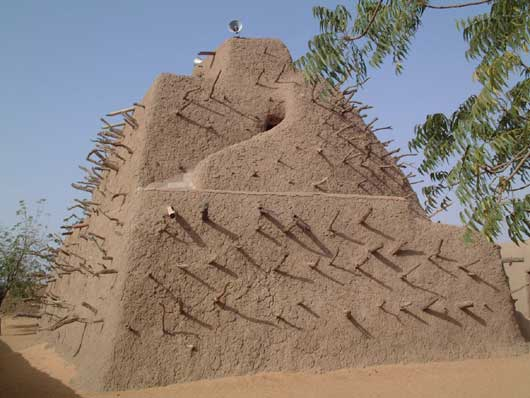
- Gao, the Tomb of Askia
- Interactive map of Tomb of Askia
- Criteria: Cultural: (ii)(iii)(iv)
- Reference: 1139
- Inscription: 2004 (28th Session)
- Endangered: 2012–
- Coordinates: 16°17′23.28″N 0°2′40.416″E

The archaeological evidence suggests that there were two settlements on the eastern bank of the Niger: Gao Ancien situated within the modern town, to the east of the Tomb of Askia, and the archaeological site of Gao-Saney (Sané in French) situated around 4 km to the east. The bed of the Wadi Gangaber passes to the south of the Gao-Saney occupation mound (tell) but to the north of Gao Ancien. The imported pottery and glass recovered from Gao-Saney suggest that the site was occupied between the 8th and 11th centuries. Gao-Saney corresponds to Sarnāh of al-Muhallabi. Al-Bakri writing in 1068 also records the existence of two towns, Both al-Muhallabi (see quote above) and al-Bakri situate Gao on the west (or right bank) of the Niger. The 17th century Tarikh al-fattash also states that in the 10th century Gao was situated on the Gourma side (i.e. the west bank) of the river. A large sand dune, La Dune Rose, lies on the west bank opposite Gao, but at Koima, on the edge of the dune at a site 4 km north of Gao, surface deposits indicate a pre 9th century settlement. This could be the west bank Gao mentioned by 10th and 11th-century authors. The site has not been excavated.

al-Idrisi, writing in around 1154, does not mention a second town, and archaeological excavations in Gao-Saney indicate the site may have beena abandoned by this time.

Al-Sadi in his Tarikh al-Sudan gives lists 32 rulers of the Zuwa dynasty and states that in 1009–1010 A.D. the 15th ruler, Zuwa Kusoy, was the first to convert to Islam. He does not actually specify where they lived except for the legendary founder of the dynasty, Zuwa Alayman who he claims came from the Yemen to Kukiya.

John Hunwick, among others, speculates that the first version of Islam was Ibadism. In c.1079–1082, a Sanhaja Berber group, inspired by the Sunni Almoravids, took control of the area, leaving behind royal epitaphs at a cemetery in Gao-Saney. Whether or not these kings feature on the kings lists of the Za dynasty recorded in the Tarikhs is debated. Dierk Lange posits that these upstarts, whether they were longstanding residents or newcomers, represent the founding of the Sonni dynasty.

=== Malian empire ===
Towards the end of the 13th century Gao lost its independence and became part of the expanding Mali Empire. What happened to the Zuwa rulers is not recorded, though royal epitaphs have been found in Kukiya which may indicate they took shelter there. Lange, again going against more long-established opinions, argues that the Za were in fact Malian vassals and the Sonni were the ones who took refuge in Kukiya.

Ibn Battuta visited Suleyman (mansa) in Gao in 1352–53, when the town formed part of the Mali Empire. He arrived by boat from Timbuktu on his return journey from visiting the capital of the Empire:

Then I travelled to the town of Kawkaw, which is a great town on the Nīl [Niger], one of the finest, biggest, and most fertile cities of the Sūdān. There is much rice there, and milk, and chickens, and fish, and the cucumber, which has no like. Its people conduct their buying and selling with cowries, like the people of Mālī.

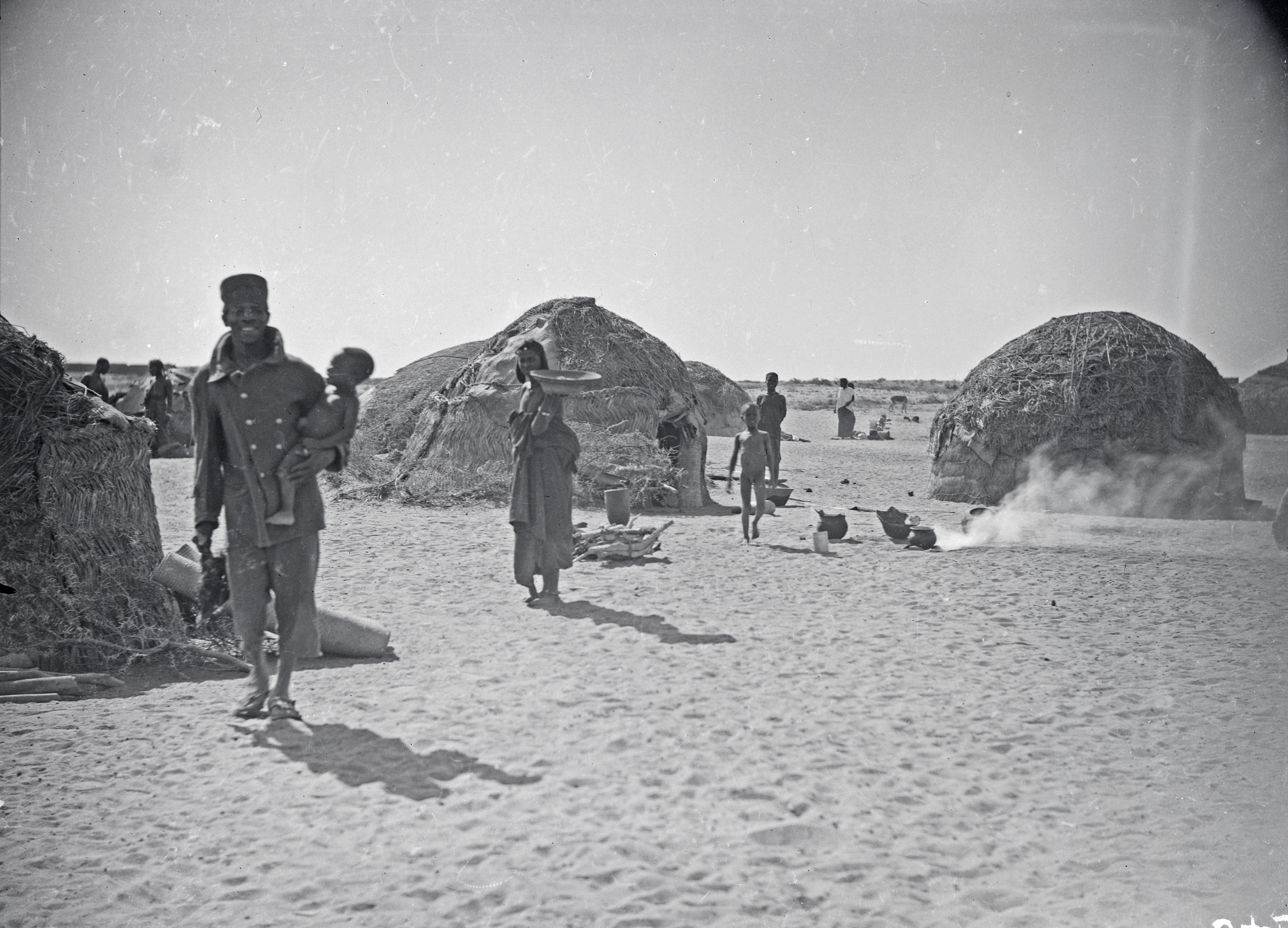
People at Gao in the early 1930s

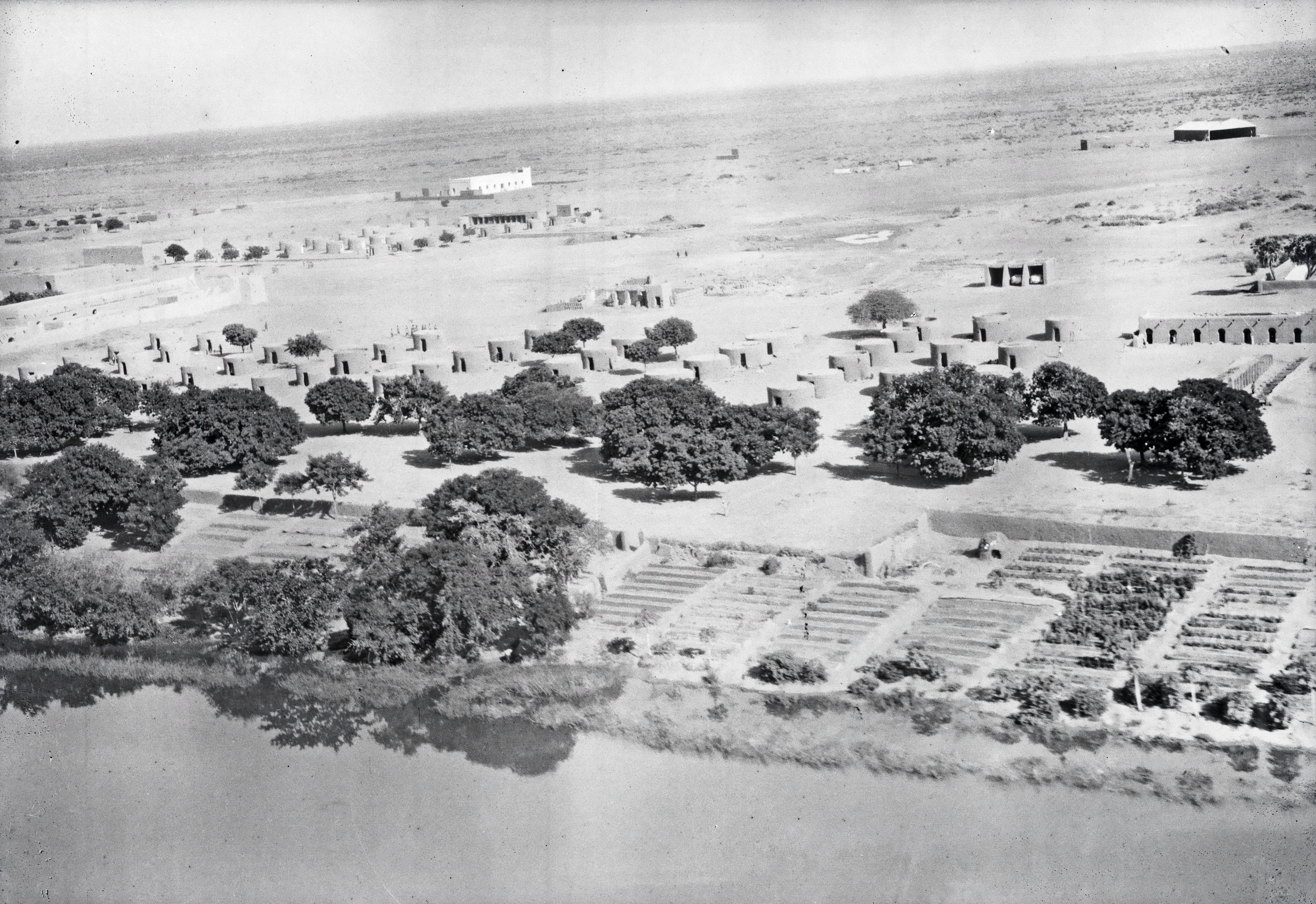
Gao in the early 1930s

After staying a month in the town, Ibn Battuta left with a caravan for Takedda and from there headed north back across the Sahara to an oasis in Tuat with a large caravan that included 600 slave girls.

Ibn Khaldun recorded that in 776 A.H or 1374/1375 AD Mali fought a war over Gao against Berber Tuareg forces from Takedda, devastating the city. It would not reclaim its former importance until the rise of the Songhai Empire.

=== Songhai empire ===
Sometime in the 14th century, Ali Kulun, the first ruler of the Sunni dynasty, rebelled against the Malian hegemony but the Malians were able to regain control. It was not until the first half of the 15th century that Sunni Sulayman Dama was able to throw off the Malian yoke. His successor, Sunni Ali Ber (1464–1492), greatly expanded the territory under Songhai control and established the Songhai Empire. He made Gao his capital.

Leo Africanus visited Gao sometime between 1506 and 1510 when the town was ruled by Askiya Muhammad I, the first ruler of the Askiya dynasty. He observed that the large town lacked a surrounding wall and was full of rich merchants.

The town is very civilized compared to Timbuktu. Bread and meat are abundant, though you cannot find wine or fruits. Actually, melons, cucumbers, and excellent squash are plentiful, and there are enormous quantities of rice. There are many sweet water wells. There is a square where on market days huge numbers of slaves are sold, both male and female. A young girl of fifteen is worth about six ducats, and a young man almost as much; small children are worth about half as much as grown slaves.

Towards the end of the 16th century, Gao controlled an empire that extended for over 1,400,000 km^{2}, an area comparable in size to the modern state of Mali. The Tarikh al-fattash reports that a survey conducted during the reign of Askiya Al-Hajj (1582–1586) found that there were 7,626 houses without counting the huts made of straw. Assuming each house was occupied by an average of 6 people, this would imply a population of around 45,000, making Gao one of the largest cities in West Africa at the time.

The Moroccan invasion of 1591 led to the collapse of the Songhai Empire. The invaders chose to make Timbuktu their capital and the importance of Gao declined. The German explorer Heinrich Barth visited Gao in 1854 on his return journey from Timbuktu. He found a village of about 300 huts constructed of matting and grouped in clusters. The inhabitants were very poor and had only a few boats as they lacked wood for their construction. The site of the ancient town was overgrown with Capparis decidua bushes.

=== 21st century ===
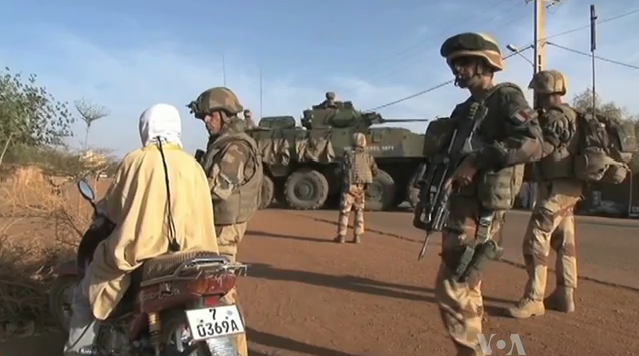
French soldiers on patrol in Gao in 2013

On 31 March 2012, one day after the capture of Kidal, Malian military forces retreated from Gao's military bases, allowing it to be occupied by Tuareg rebellion member groups MNLA and Ancar Dine. Timbuktu was captured the following day. On 6 April, the MNLA declared the region independent of Mali as the nation of Azawad. After the Battle of Gao on 26 and 27 June 2012, the MNLA lost control to Islamist militias.

After the 2012 rebellion forced the Malian Army out of Gao and the state of Azawad was proclaimed, the National Movement for the Liberation of Azawad took control of the governor's building, flying the flag of Azawad over it and rechristening it the Palace of Azawad.

On 26 June 2012, the tension came to all-out combat in Gao between the MNLA and MOJWA, with both sides firing heavy weapons. MNLA Secretary General Bilal ag Acherif was wounded in the battle. The MNLA were soon driven from the city, and from Kidal and Timbuktu shortly after. However, the MNLA stated that it continued to maintain forces and control some rural areas in the region. The following day, Ansar Dine announced that it was in control of all the cities of northern Mali.

On 19 January 2013, it was reported that Gao journalist Kader Toure was killed after being suspected of working for foreign news services. In retaliation, the local youth are reported to have lynched Islamic police commissioner Aliou Toure who was recruited by MUWA, Movement for Oneness and Jihad in West Africa, who took control of the city in June 2012.

In January 2013 French warplanes bombed parts of Gao, including the airport, in an attempt to drive out fighters from the Movement for Unity and Jihad in West Africa.

Gao was captured by French and Malian forces on 26 January 2013, as the Islamists were kicked out from the city.

On 17 March 2015, a United Nations AH-64 helicopter crashed during an exercise near the town, killing both pilots. The AH-64 came from the Dutch Air Force's Defense Helicopter Command.

On 18 January 2017, a suicide bomber from Al-Mourabitoun drove a vehicle filled with explosives into a military camp near Gao, killing 77 people and injuring at least 115 (see 2017 Gao bombing). The incident was the deadliest terrorist attack in Malian history.

On 25 April 2026, militants began an attack the city as part of major offensive.

== Culture ==
The population of Gao mostly speak Koyraboro Senni but includes many ethnicities, including the Bozo (traditionally nomadic river dwellers), Fulfulde/Fulani cattle keepers, and Tuareg nomads, Arabs as well as Bambara peoples from western Mali.

The seventh Festival des arts et cultures songhay was celebrated in February 2007 at Gao, reflecting the city's importance as a Songhay cultural capital.

== Sites ==
Attractions in Gao include the original fourteenth century Kankou Moussa Mosque, the Askia Tomb (a UNESCO World Heritage Site) built in 1495 and incorporating another mosque, a museum devoted to the Sahel, markets including a night market, and La Dune Rose, a sand dune named after its appearance at dawn and nightfall.

=== Mosques ===
==== Regional patterns ====
The mosques of the Niger Bend and the pre-Saharan steppe form a group corresponding to the northern extremity of the Sahel, in direct contact with the desert. The main façade of the mosques of the Niger Bend is smooth, with no vertical elements, and terraces with merlons are rare. On the external façade, the mihrab forms a low projection ending in a conical point, but is not surmounted by a tower. Inside the mosque, the pillars are massive, there are no arcades and there are few mural decorations. Only the minaret stands out among these rather low buildings. In short, this group of mosques is mainly found in northern Mali and Niger and is the prerogative of the Songhay and Tuareg populations. It is characterised by a minaret, a low and projecting conical mihrab tower, the rarity of buttresses and battlements, and massive supports in the prayer hall, as in the mosques of Sankore and Sidi Yahya in Timbuktu and Tendirma in Mali.

==== The mosques of Gao ====
Once the centre of the Songhay Empire and a bustling trading centre, Gao boasts a rich historical heritage in its three urban settlements: Gao Saney, Old Gao and Gao. Excavations in Gao Saney, the oldest settlement east of the modern city, revealed a royal cemetery decorated with epitaphs and tombstones dating to as early as 1042 CE. Old Gao, built in the eighth to tenth centuries, coexisted with Gao Saney and served as an integral part of the city's urban fabric.

In Old Gao, excavations uncovered two monumental buildings dating from the early tenth century. One of these structures is believed to be a mosque, and includes architectural elements characteristic of the period. This mosque likely played a central role in the religious and cultural life of Old Gao, serving as a place of worship and community gathering.

Furthermore, the absence of a mihrab niche in this mosque suggests its possible use by early Muslim communities, possibly Ismailis or Ibadis, reflecting the diverse religious landscape of the region at the time. Dating from the late twelfth to fourteenth centuries, the mosque is one of the oldest mosques excavated in West Africa to date, providing valuable insights into the early spread of Islam in the region.

In addition, the mosque tomb of Askia Muhammad, built between 1493 and 1538, displays unique architectural elements and extensive dimensions. Covering an area of some 2500 m^{2}, this large structure consisted of seven bays parallel to the qibla wall, with arcades resting on wide piers. The courtyard of the mosque, which was larger than the covered hall, had a minaret rising 12 metres in the centre. This distinctive minaret, decorated with toron, was similar to Ibn Tulun's mosque in Cairo, highlighting the architectural influences that shaped Gao's mosques during this period.

== Education ==
Gao School (primary school).

== Notable residents ==
- Mokhtar Belmokhtar (suspected)
- Askia Muhammad I

== International relations ==
Gao is twinned with:

- Thionville, France
- Berkeley, California, United States

== See also ==
- List of cities in Mali
- Koïma

== Sources ==
- Barth, Heinrich (1859), Travels and discoveries in North and Central Africa: Being a journal of an expedition undertaken under the auspices of H.B.M.'s government, in the years 1849–1855 (Volume 3), New York: Harper & Brothers.
- Cissé, M.; McIntosh, S.K.; Dussubieux, L.; Fenn, T.; Gallagher, D.; Chipps Smith, A. (2013), "Excavations at Gao Saney: new evidence for settlement growth, trade, and interaction on the Niger Bend in the first millennium CE", Journal of African Archaeology, 11 (1): 9–37, doi:10.3213/2191-5784-10233.
- Hunwick, John (1994), "Gao and the Almoravids revisited: ethnicity, political change and the limits of interpretation", Journal of African History, 35 (2): 251–273, doi:10.1017/s0021853700026426, JSTOR 183219, S2CID 153794361.
- Hunwick, John O. (2003), Timbuktu and the Songhay Empire: Al-Sadi's Tarikh al-Sudan down to 1613 and other contemporary documents, Leiden: Brill, ISBN 978-90-04-12560-5. First published in 1999 as ISBN 978-90-04-11207-0.
- Insoll, Timothy (1997), "Iron age Gao: an archaeological contribution", Journal of African History, 38 (1): 1–30, doi:10.1017/s0021853796006822, JSTOR 182944, S2CID 163151474.
- Kâti, Mahmoûd Kâti ben el-Hâdj el-Motaouakkel (1913), Tarikh el-fettach ou Chronique du chercheur, pour servir à l'histoire des villes, des armées et des principaux personnages du Tekrour (in French), Houdas, O., Delafosse, M. ed. and trans., Paris: Ernest Leroux. Also available from Aluka but requires subscription.
- Lange, Dierk (1991), "Les rois de Gao-Sané et les Almoravides", Journal of African History (in French), 32 (2): 251–275, doi:10.1017/s002185370002572x, JSTOR 182617, S2CID 162674956.
- Lange, Dierk (1994), "From Mande to Songhay: Towards a political and ethnic history of medieval Gao", Journal of African History, 35 (2): 275–301, doi:10.1017/s0021853700026438, JSTOR 183220, S2CID 153657364.
- Levtzion, Nehemia (1973), Ancient Ghana and Mali, London: Methuen, ISBN 978-0-8419-0431-6.
- Levtzion, Nehemia; Hopkins, John F.P., eds. (2000), Corpus of Early Arabic Sources for West Africa, New York, NY: Marcus Weiner Press, ISBN 978-1-55876-241-1. First published in 1981 by Cambridge University Press, ISBN 0-521-22422-5.
- Moraes Farias, Paulo F. de (1990), "The oldest extant writing of West Africa: medieval epigraphs from Essuk, Saney, and Egef-n-Tawaqqast (Mali)", Journal des Africanistes, 60 (2): 65–113, doi:10.3406/jafr.1990.2452. Link is to a scan on the Persée database that omits some photographs of the epigraphs.
- Sauvaget, J. (1950), "Les épitaphes royales de Gao", Bulletin de l'Ifan, XII (2): 418–440. A reprint of (1949), Al-Andalus XIV: I, 123–141.
- Takezawa, Shoichiro; Cisse, Mamadou (2012). "Discovery of the Earliest Royal Palace in Gao and Its Implications for the History of West Africa". Cahiers d'Études Africaines. 52 (208): 813–44. doi:10.4000/etudesafricaines.17167. JSTOR 41708210.
