= Bourem Cercle =

Coordinates: 16.946°N 0.313°W

Bourem
- Cercle
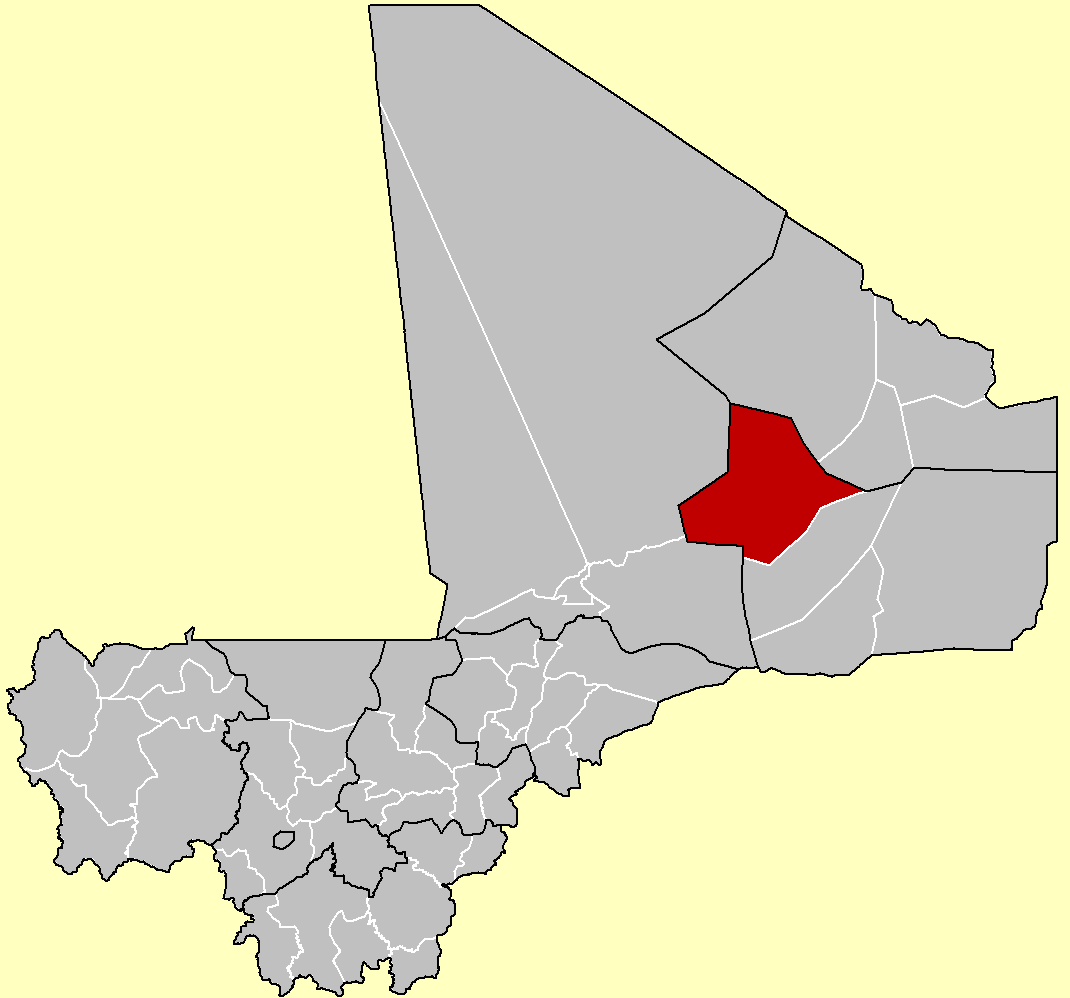
- Cercle of Bourem in Mali
- Country: Mali
- Region: Gao Region
- Admin HQ (Chef-lieu): Bourem

Area
  - Total: 43,000 km^{2} (17,000 sq mi)

Population (2009)
  - Total: 115,958
  - Density: 2.7/km^{2} (7.0/sq mi)
- Time zone: UTC+0 (GMT)

Bourem Cercle is an administrative subdivision of the Gao Region of north-eastern Mali. The administrative center (chef-lieu) is the town of Bourem.

The cercle is divided into five communes:

- Bamba
- Bourem
- Taboye
- Tarkint
- Temera
