= Marsden Jones =

- Born: 20 December 1920
- Died: 11 June 1992 (age 71); Cyprus

John Marsden Beaumont Jones (20 December 1920 – 11 June 1992), known as Marsden Jones, was an emeritus professor and the founder and first director of the Center for Arabic Studies at the American University in Cairo.

His special interests were early Islam, the early emergence of Islamic institutions, and the study of modern Islamic movements in Egypt. He translated Al-Waqidi's Kitab al-Tarikh wa al-Maghazi and worked on early sira literature, and he helped publish a series of volumes in Arabic on Leaders of Contemporary Literature in Egypt.

He was the brother-in-law of Sir Philip Jones.
