= Journal of African Archaeology =

Academic journal

- Discipline: Archaeology
- Language: English
- Edited by: Julia Budka, Foreman Bandama, Nikolas Gestrich, Jacques Aymeric-Nsangou

Publication details
- History: 2003–present
- Publisher: Brill Publishers on behalf of the Goethe University Frankfurt
- Frequency: Biannually
- Open access: Delayed, after 3 years
- Impact factor: 1.4 (2022)

Standard abbreviations
- ISO 4: J. Afr. Archaeol.

Indexing
- ISSN: 1612-1651 (print); 2191-5784 (web)
- LCCN: 2019263235
- JSTOR: 16121651
- OCLC no.: 54060298

Links
- Journal homepage

The Journal of African Archaeology is a biannual peer-reviewed academic journal covering archaeological studies on Africa. It was established by Sonja Magnavita in 2003. From 2003 to 2016, the Centre for Interdisciplinary African Studies and the Department of African Archaeology and Archaeobotany of Goethe University Frankfurt published it in association with Africa Magna Verlag. Since 2017, the departments publish it in association with Brill Publishers.

== Abstracting and indexing ==
The journal is abstracted and indexed in:

- Anthropological Literature
- Arts and Humanities Citation Index
- Current Contents/Arts & Humanities
- EBSCO databases
- International Bibliography of Periodical Literature
- International Bibliography of the Social Sciences
- Scopus

According to the Journal Citation Reports, the journal has a 2022 impact factor of 1.4.

== Editors-in-chief ==
The following persons are or have been editor-in-chief:

- Julia Budka, Foreman Bandama, Nikolas Gestrich, Jacques Aymeric-Nsangou (2026-present)
- Katherine Grillo (2018–2026)
- Peter Breunig
- Sonja Magnavita
