= Bourem =

- Commune and town
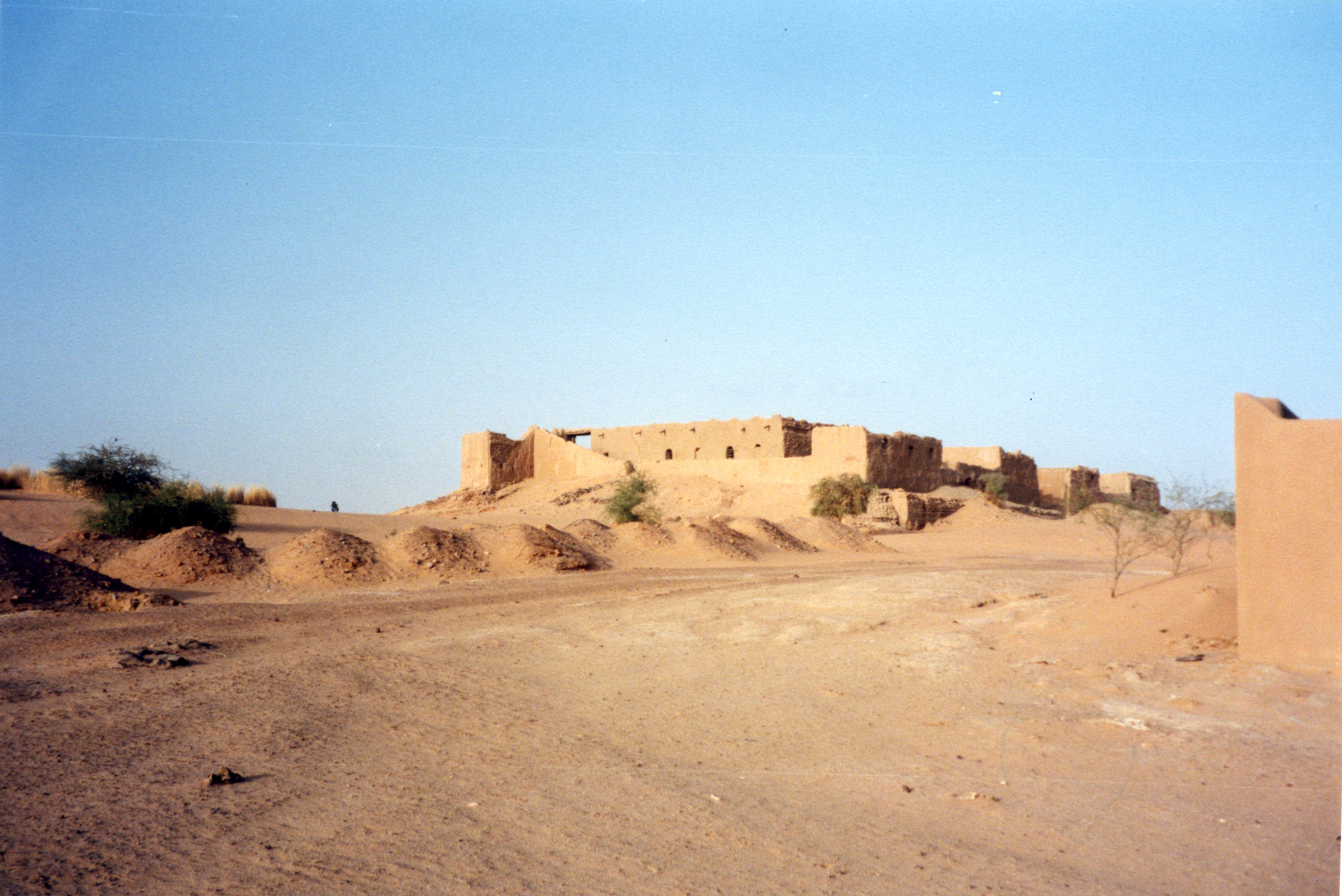
- Bourem

- Location in Mali
- Coordinates: 16°57′12″N 0°21′14″W
- Country: Mali
- Region: Gao Region
- Cercle: Bourem Cercle

Area
  - Total: 6,294 km^{2} (2,430 sq mi)

Population (2009 census)
  - Total: 27,486
  - Density: 4.367/km^{2} (11.31/sq mi)
- Time zone: UTC+0 (GMT)

Bourem is a commune and small town in the Gao Region of northeastern Mali. The town sits on the left bank of the River Niger.

It was the site of an attack by the Permanent Strategic Framework for Peace, Security, and Development (CSP-PSD) on the Malian Armed Forces and their Wagner Group allies on 12 September 2023.
