= John Hunwick =

British academic and author (1936–2015)

John Owen Hunwick (6 January 1936 – 1 April 2015) was a British academic, author, and Africanist. He published several books, articles and journals in the African Studies field. He was professor emeritus at Northwestern University, having retired in 2004 after 23 years of service. Hunwick died in Skokie, Illinois on 1 April 2015, at the age of 79.

== Biography ==
Born on 6 January 1936 in Chard, Somerset, in England, to Rev. Cyril Owen Hunwick, a Methodist minister and his wife (whom he married in 1929) Doris Louise Miller. In 1938 they moved to Horsham, Sussex, where John first went to school. In 1942 the family moved to Ramsey, Huntingdonshire (now Cambridgeshire). In 1945 they moved to Bridport, Dorset, and in the following year John entered Grammar School, where he began to learn French and Latin.

In 1950, he was sent to Kent College, a Methodist boarding school in Canterbury. While he was there the family moved to Shrewsbury, Shropshire. When John left Kent College, at age 18, he was drafted into the army, his home town being Shropshire, he had to join the local regiment, The King's Shropshire Light Infantry. Soon he was selected as a potential officer candidate and sent off to train at a Light Infantry camp near York. In February 1955 he was selected for full officer training, and spent four months at an officer training camp near Chester, ending up as a 2nd Lieutenant. He was given options of how and where to serve, and rather than joining his home regiment, partly involved in anti-Mau Mau fighting in Kenya, he volunteered to serve in the Somaliland Scouts, a force in what was then British Somaliland, whose regular soldiers were Somalis and its officers British. He sailed to Aden and then flew to Hargeisa in September 1955. In Somaliland his service took him first to Burao, then to Company A in Ainabo, which later moved to Hargeisa and later to Adedle.

In September 1956 he attended the School of Oriental and African Studies (SOAS), University of London. There he spent three years studying Arabic, with some courses in Islamic history and culture with professors such as Bernard Lewis, Peter Holt and Ann Lambton, while his primary teacher of the language was Marsden Jones. In 1959 he graduated with a 1st-Class Honours degree in Arabic.

Early in 1960 John took a position teaching Arabic at the University of Ibadan, Nigeria (then called University College, a branch of the University of London), a few months later he was offered a "Lectureship" in Arabic, which he readily accepted. He remained at the University of Ibadan till 1967, during his time there he established a Department of Arabic and Islamic Studies, he also helped establish a Centre of Arabic Documentation for the microfilming of Arabic manuscripts, and at the same time began a journal, the Research Bulletin, to publish information on the microfilmed manuscripts and articles about the manuscript tradition.

In 1967 John took a temporary Lectureship at SOAS to teach Arabic. He taught there for two academic years. Early in 1969 he was offered the position of Associate Professor in the Department of History at the University of Ghana in Legon. By then he had already begun research into historical aspects of Islam in Africa, beginning with interest in the Timbuktu tradition and the Songhay empire.

While in Ghana he began teaching a year-long undergraduate course in the history of the Islamic empire from the life of the Prophet through to the 16th century in North Africa. In his first years there he also worked on his PhD thesis, editing and translating with commentaries and introduction the replies of al-Maghili to questions put to him by Askiya al-hajj Muhammad of Songhay, using manuscripts Hunwick had first started studying when at the University of Ibadan. The thesis was presented and approved at SOAS in 1974, and eleven years later became the basis of his published book Shari'a in Songhay, the first of his books and public lectures.

In 1981 he began his tenure at Northwestern University, holding a joint appointment in the Department of Religion and taught the social and intellectual history of Islamic Africa. As well as writing many books, he edited Religion and National Integration in Africa, and was a founder-editor of Sudanic Africa: a Journal of Historical Sources. He is former director of the Fontes Historiae Africanae project of the International Academic Union, and has received awards from the National Endowment for the Humanities, the American Council of Learned Societies, and the Fulbright Commission. He is a Fellow of the Ghana Academy of Arts and Sciences. He was elected fellow of the academy in 1976.

== Honours and awards ==
- ASA Distinguished Africanist Award 2005
- Elected Fellow of the Ghana Academy of Arts & Sciences, 1976.
- National Endowment of the Humanities award, June 1997 – October 1998, for preparation of Arabic Literature of Africa, Vol. IV The Writings of Western Sudanic Africa"
- "Text Prize", African Studies Association, 2001, for published book: Timbuktu and the Songhay Empire.

== Bibliography ==
- Shari'a in Songhay: The Replies of al-Mighili to the Questions of Askia al-Hajj Muhammad (c. 1498) (Fontes Historiae Africanae Series Arabica), Oxford University Press, 1985.
- The Hidden Treasures of Timbuktu, Thames & Hudson, 2008.
- Arabic Literature of Africa Vol. II, IV
- Jews of A Saharan Oasis: Elimination of the Tamantit Community, 2006
- West Africa, Islam and the Arab World: Studies in Honor of Basil Davidson, 2006
- Sufism and Religious Brotherhoods in Senegal, Markus Wiener Publishers, 2005 (as editor)
- Arabic Literature of Africa lll
- The Cloth of Many Colored Silks: Papers on History and Society Ghanaian and Islamic in Honor of Ivor Wilks, 1997
- The African Diaspora in the Mediterranean Lands of Islam, 2002
- Timbuktu and the Songhay Empire, 1999
