= Gao Cercle =

Coordinates: 16°45′N 0°35′E

Gao
- Cercle
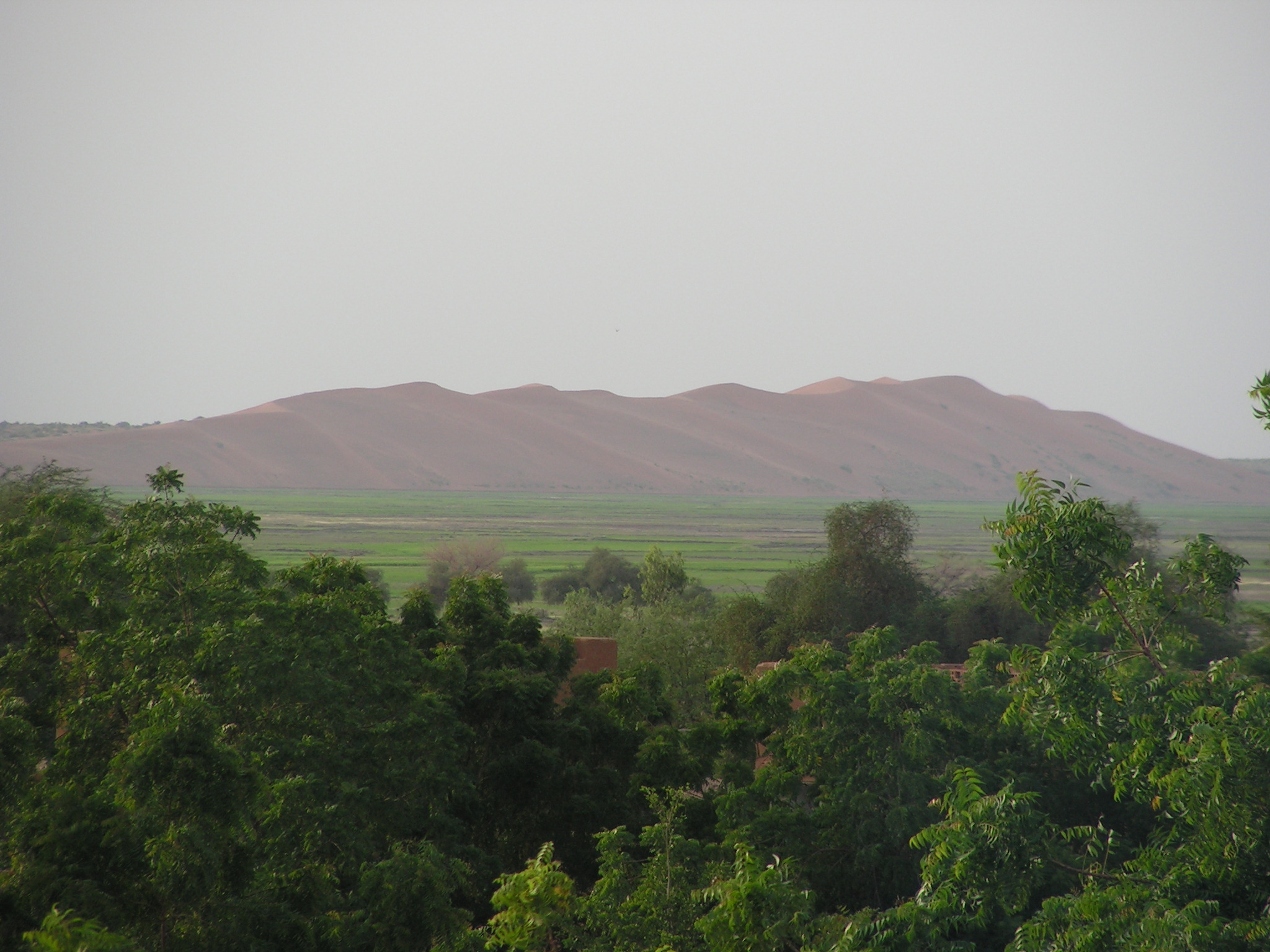

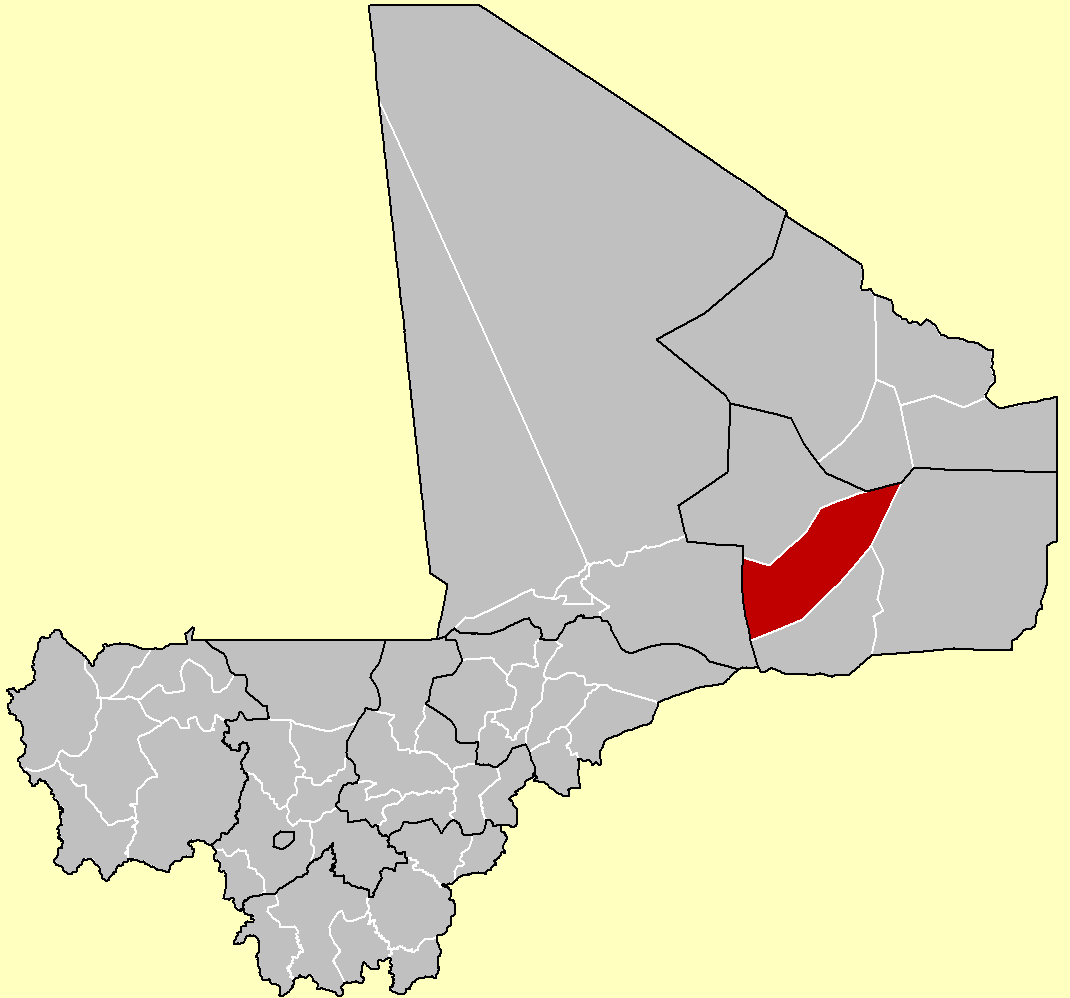
- Cercle of Gao in Mali
- Country: Mali
- Region: Gao Region
- Capital: Gao

Area
  - Total: 31,250 km^{2} (12,070 sq mi)

Population (2009 census)
  - Total: 239,853
  - Density: 7.675/km^{2} (19.88/sq mi)
- Time zone: UTC+0 (GMT)

Gao Cercle is an administrative subdivision of the Gao Region of north-eastern Mali. The administrative center (chef-lieu) is the town of Gao.

During the Northern Mali conflict in 2012, the main Tuareg rebel group, the National Movement for the Liberation of Azawad (MNLA) lost the region to the Islamist groups Ansar Dine, Movement for Oneness and Jihad in West Africa (MOJWA) and Al-Qaeda in the Islamic Maghreb (AQIM). In 2013, the Islamists then lost most of the region to French and Malian soldiers.

The cercle is divided into seven communes:

- Anchawadi
- Gabero
- Gao (an urban commune)
- Gounzoureye
- N'Tillit
- Sony Aliber
- Tilemsi
