= Gao Region =

Region of Mali

- Region
- Location within Mali
- Interactive map of Gao Region
- Coordinates: 17°5′55″N 0°21′5″E
- Country: Mali
- Capital: Gao

Area
  - Total: 89,532 km^{2} (34,568 sq mi)

Population (2023)
  - Total: 827,614
  - Density: 9.2438/km^{2} (23.941/sq mi)
- Time zone: UTC±0 (UTC)
- HDI (2017): 0.386 low · 5th

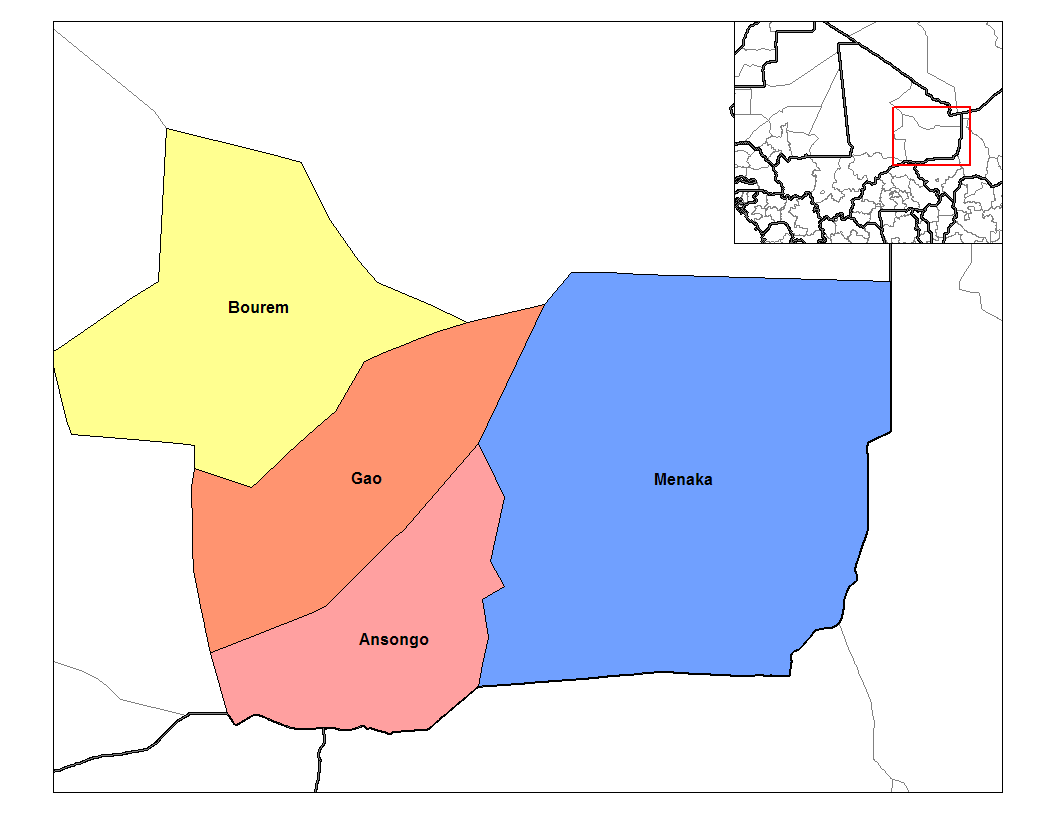
Cercles of the Gao Region prior to the 2012 reorganization of Mali's regions

Gao (Bambara: ߜߊߏ ߘߌߣߋߖߊ tr. Gao Dineja) is a region in northeastern Mali. The capital city is Gao.

== Geography ==
The region is bordered to the north by Kidal Region, to the west by Tombouctou Region and Taoudénit Region, to the east by the Ménaka Region, and most of the south by Niger (Tahoua Region and Tillabéri Region), sharing a portion of the southern border with Burkina Faso (Sahel Region). The towns include Gao, Bourem, and Bamba.

== Etymology ==
The name of the Gao Region comes from its capital of the same name. Older writings refer to the city variously as Kaukau, Kounkou, Kookou, and Kawkaw. Al-Bakrī stated that the name of the city originated as an onomatopoeia for the distinctive sound of local tom-tom drums, which were played when the king sat down to eat.

In his French translation of Tarikh al-Sudan, Houdas proposed an alternative explanation for the city's name. He argued that it comes from the Songhay Kokoy Korya–meaning the "king's town" in reference to its status as the capital–suggesting this phrase was mistaken for a toponym.

== History ==
Gao Region formerly comprised the entire eastern portion of the country, east of Tombouctou Region. In 1991, the northern half of Gao Region became Kidal Region.

The Gao Region is part of northern Mali that was separated and declared independent by the National Movement for the Liberation of Azawad (MNLA) during the Tuareg rebellion of 2012. ^{[needs rephrasing for better context]} After the 1st Battle of Gao, the MNLA lost control to Islamist militias. Several other battles took place during the war, particularly in Gao.

== Administrative subdivisions ==
For administrative purposes, the Gao Region is divided into three cercles:

Cercle name	Area (km^{2})	Population Census 1998	Population Census 2009
Ansongo	23,614	82,398	132,205
Bourem	43,000	80,667	115,958
Gao	31,250	143,300	239,853

== Demographics ==
The Gao Region is the eleventh most populated region in Mali, with a population of 727,517 in 2022. With a total fertility rate at 5 births per woman, Gao has a lower TFR than the Malian national average of 6.1 births per woman.

=== Ethnicity ===
Ethnicity in Gao (2022)
1. Songhai (54.1%)
2. Tuareg (32.7%)
3. Arab (6.08%)
4. Bambara (3.55%)
5. Fula (2.05%)
6. Bozo (0.50%)
7. Other (1.01%)
Mother tongues in Gao region (2022)
1. Songhai (54.9%)
2. Tuareg (32.6%)
3. Arabic (5.48%)
4. Bambara (3.86%)
5. Other Malian (2.88%)
6. Other African (0.16%)
7. Other foreign (0.08%)

Gao is the only Songhai-majority region in Mali, with the ethnic group constituting 54.10% of the regional population. The Tuareg are the largest minority, representing roughly a third of Gao's population. Smaller minorities in the region include the Arabs (Maure), Bambara, Fula, and Bozo.

=== Religion ===
The 2022 census found that 99.51% of the population in Gao was Muslim, 0.47% was Christian, and 0.01% identified with traditional faiths, and 0.01% practised other religions. Islam is the dominant religion among all of Gao's main ethnic groups, with the Songhai, Tuareg, Arab, Fula, and Bozo peoples being almost entirely Muslim.

== See also ==
- Cercles of Mali
- Regions of Mali
