= Garbakoïra =

- Commune and village
- Location in Mali
- Coordinates: 16.507°N 3.182°W
- Country: Mali
- Region: Tombouctou Region
- Cercle: Diré Cercle

Area
  - Total: 198 km^{2} (76 sq mi)

Population (2009 census)
  - Total: 4,011
  - Density: 20.3/km^{2} (52.5/sq mi)
- Time zone: UTC+0 (GMT)
- Climate: BWh

Garbakoïra is a commune and village of the Cercle of Diré in the Tombouctou Region of Mali. The village lies on the left bank of the left arm of the River Niger, 35 km south west of the town of Timbuktu and 37 km north east of the town of Diré.
