= Sidi Amar =

Sidi Amar may refer to:

== Places ==
- In Algeria:
  - Sidi Amar, Annaba
  - Sidi Amar, Saïda
  - Sidi Amar, Tipaza
  - Zawiyet Sidi Amar Cherif, Boumerdès
  - Mount Sidi Amar, a 1,985 m high mountain in the Ouarsenis Range
- In Morocco:
  - Sidi Amar, Morocco
- In Mali:
  - Bourem Sidi Amar, a village and commune of the Diré Cercle, Tombouctou Region, Mali

== People ==
- Sidi Mahmoud Ben Amar, a revered Muslim whose tomb in Timbuktu is a UNESCO World Heritage Site
