= Battle of Timbuktu =

2013 battle in Mali

Coordinates: 16.7667°N 3.0000°W

- Part of the Northern Mali conflict
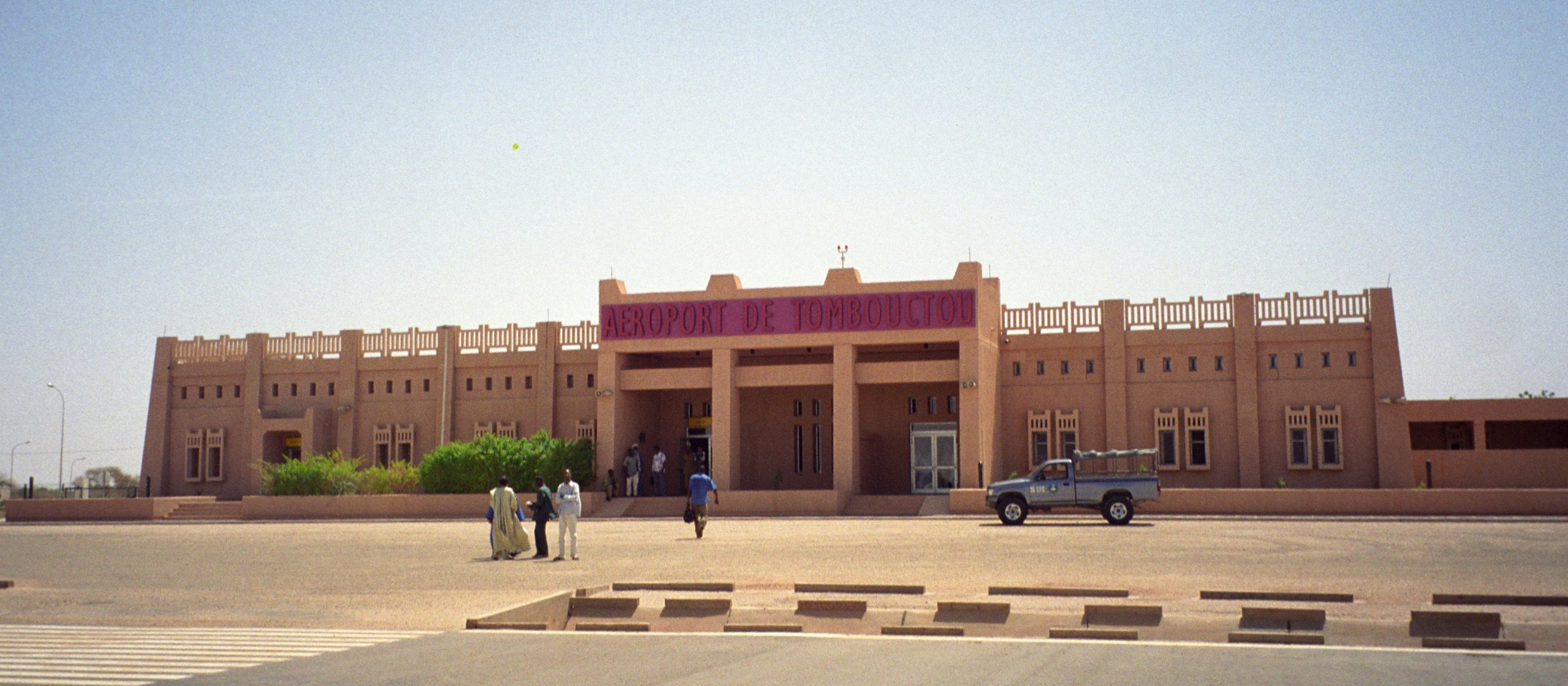
- Timbuktu Airport
Date	20–21 March 2013 (1 day)
Location	Timbuktu, Mali
Result	French-Malian Victory

Belligerents
France; Mali	MOJWA

Strength
Several hundred Malians, 150 French soldiers	50–100

Casualties and losses
(Mali) 1 killed, 8 wounded	5–11 killed

The Battle of Timbuktu occurred in Timbuktu, Mali, in March 2013, between Islamist groups and Mali government forces supported by France.

On the night of 20–21 March, a group of Islamist militants tried to infiltrate the airport. A car with armed men also tried to break into the city; however, French and Malian forces pushed them back.

== Attack ==
The city of Timbuktu was guarded by the Malian army while about 150 French soldiers guarded the airport. Then, about 50 to 100 Islamists launched an attack from Bamba, west of Bourem, at March 20 at 10:19 pm. A suicide car bomber exploded himself on a road south of the Timbuktu airport. Camouflaged in the colors of the Malian army, the vehicle arrived near a checkpoint held by Malian soldiers. The attack killed one and wounded another two Malians. Shortly after, some 30 jihadists crossed the Mouamar Gaddafi canal and attacked the airport from the east. The shooting lasted several hours before dying out in the evening. Meanwhile, Malian troops were coming out of Timbuktu to help the French, but they crossed another group of jihadists. Three Malians were wounded from friendly fire. The French then asked the Malians to retreat to avoid further fratricide. At 1 am, the French bombarded Jihadist positions, leading them to retreat. The jihadists returned to the offensive the next morning, but after an hour of fighting, and after two attempted suicide attacks, they retreated. The attack was later claimed by MOJAO, but the French claimed that AQIM participated as well. Eight Malians were wounded and one killed, with the French giving estimates of 5 to 11 Jihadist killed.

== See also ==
- Second Battle of Timbuktu
