= Gari, Tombouctou Region =

Gari
- Village
- Location in Mali
- Coordinates: 16°23′59″N 3°17′59″W
- Country: Mali
- Region: Tombouctou Region
- Cercle: Diré Cercle
- Commune: Tinguereguif
- Time zone: UTC+0 (GMT)

Gari is a village and seat of the commune of Tinguereguif in the Cercle of Diré in the Tombouctou Region of Mali.
