= Sarakoira =

- Village
- Country: Mali
- Region: Tombouctou Region
- Cercle: Diré Cercle
- Commune: Binga
- Time zone: UTC+0 (GMT)

Sarakoira is a village and seat of the commune of Binga in the Cercle of Diré in the Tombouctou Region of Mali.
