= Binga, Mali =

Binga
- Commune
- Location in Mali
- Coordinates: 16°03′26″N 3°27′37″W
- Country: Mali
- Region: Tombouctou Region
- Cercle: Diré Cercle
- Admin HQ (Chef-lieu): Salakoira

Area
  - Total: 252 km^{2} (97 sq mi)

Population (2009 census)
  - Total: 3,021
  - Density: 12.0/km^{2} (31.0/sq mi)
- Time zone: UTC+0 (GMT)

Binga is a rural commune of the Cercle of Diré in the Tombouctou Region of Mali. The administrative center (chef-lieu) is the village of Sarakoira.
