= Dangha =

- Commune and village
- Location in Mali
- Coordinates: 16°27′54″N 3°08′11″W
- Country: Mali
- Region: Tombouctou Region
- Cercle: Diré Cercle

Area
  - Total: 120 km^{2} (46 sq mi)

Population (2009 census)
  - Total: 13,045
  - Density: 110/km^{2} (280/sq mi)
- Time zone: UTC+0 (GMT)
- Climate: BWh

Dangha is a village and commune of the Cercle of Diré in the Tombouctou Region of Mali.
