= Timbuktu =

City in Tombouctou Region, Mali

Timbuktu Tunbutu (Koyra Chiini Songhay) Tin Bukt (Tamashek) Himba
- City

Names transcription(s)
  - Tamashek: ⵜⵏⵀⵗⵜ تِينْ بُكْتْ
  - Koyra Chiini: تُمْبُتُ
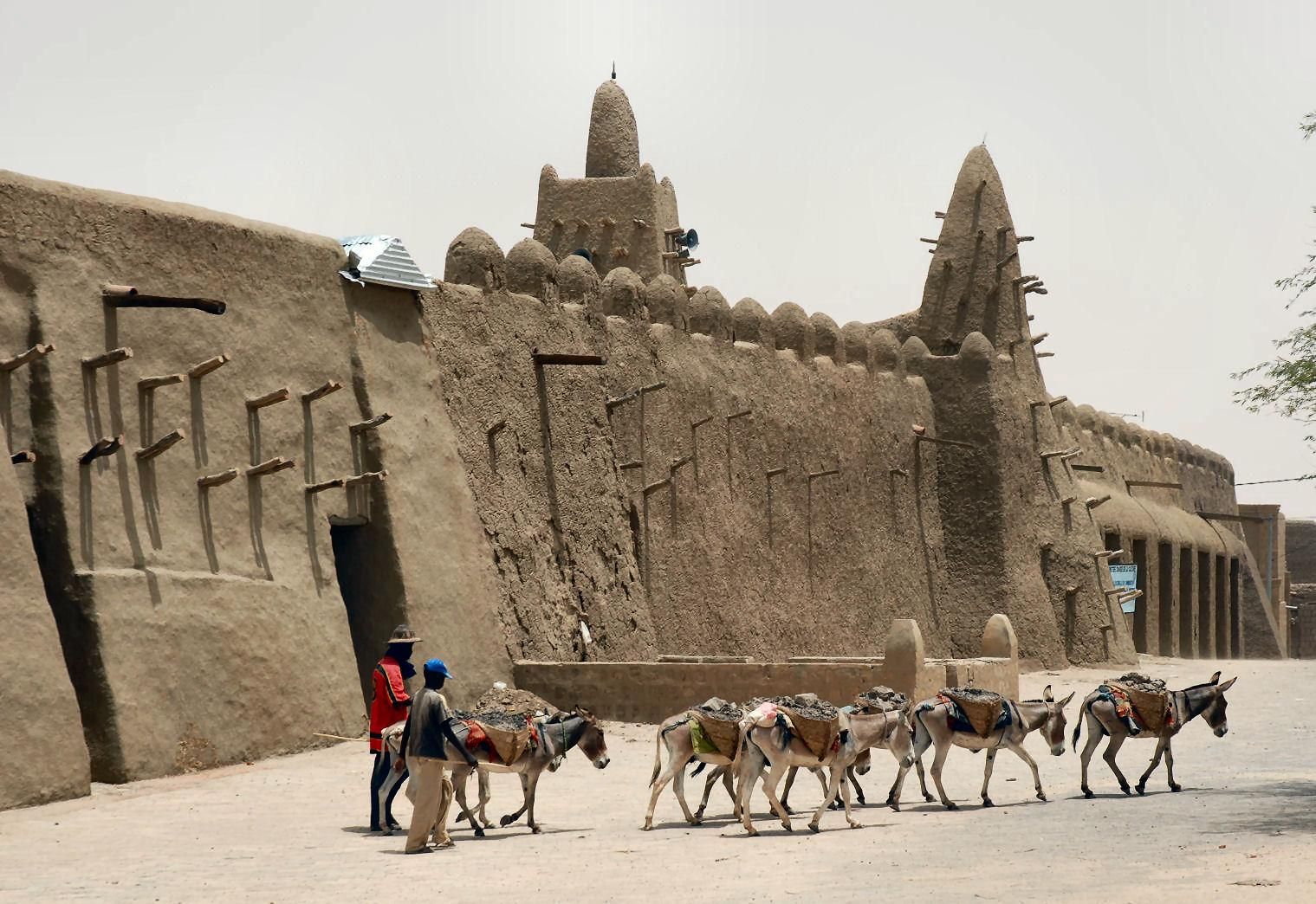
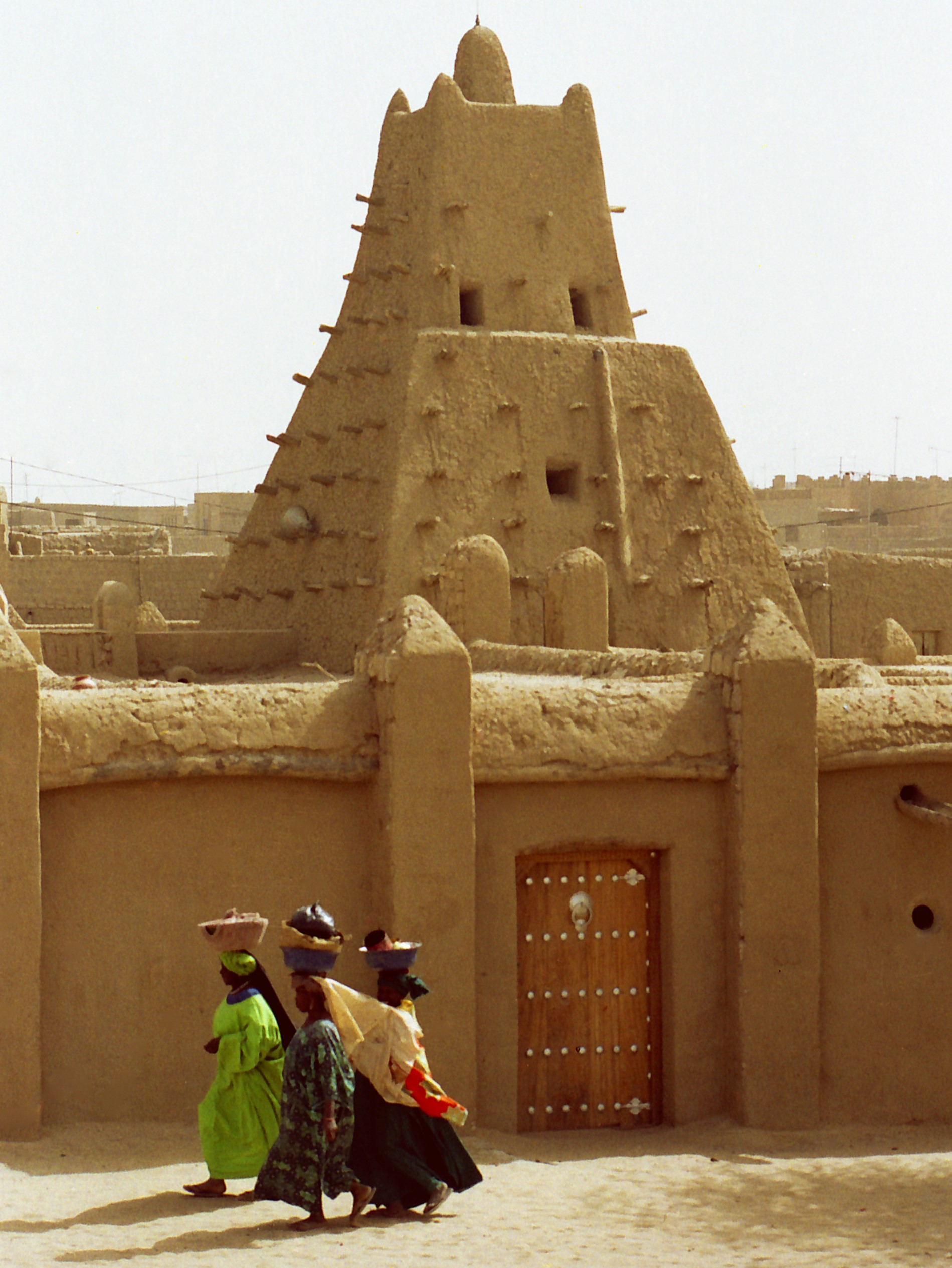
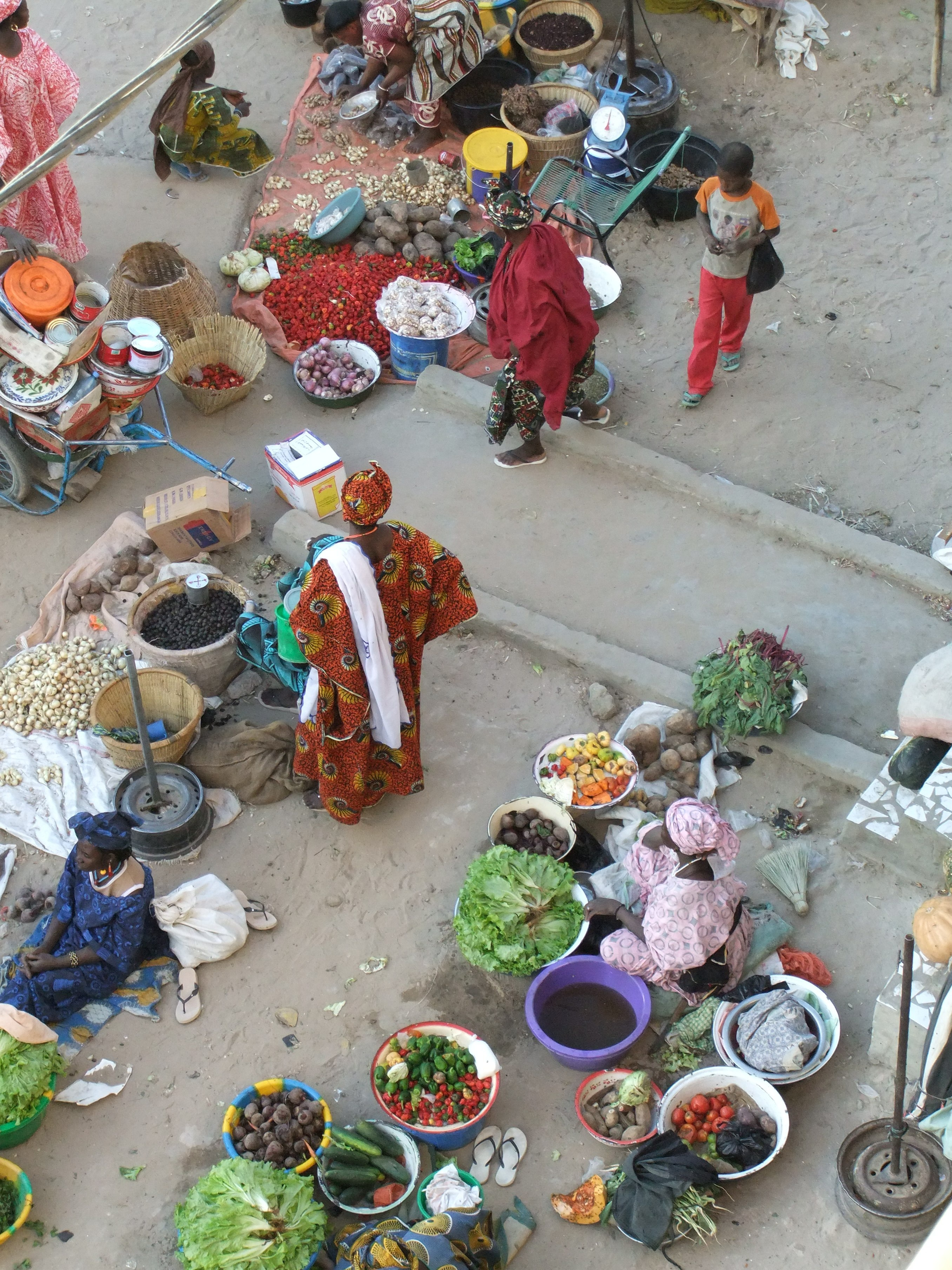
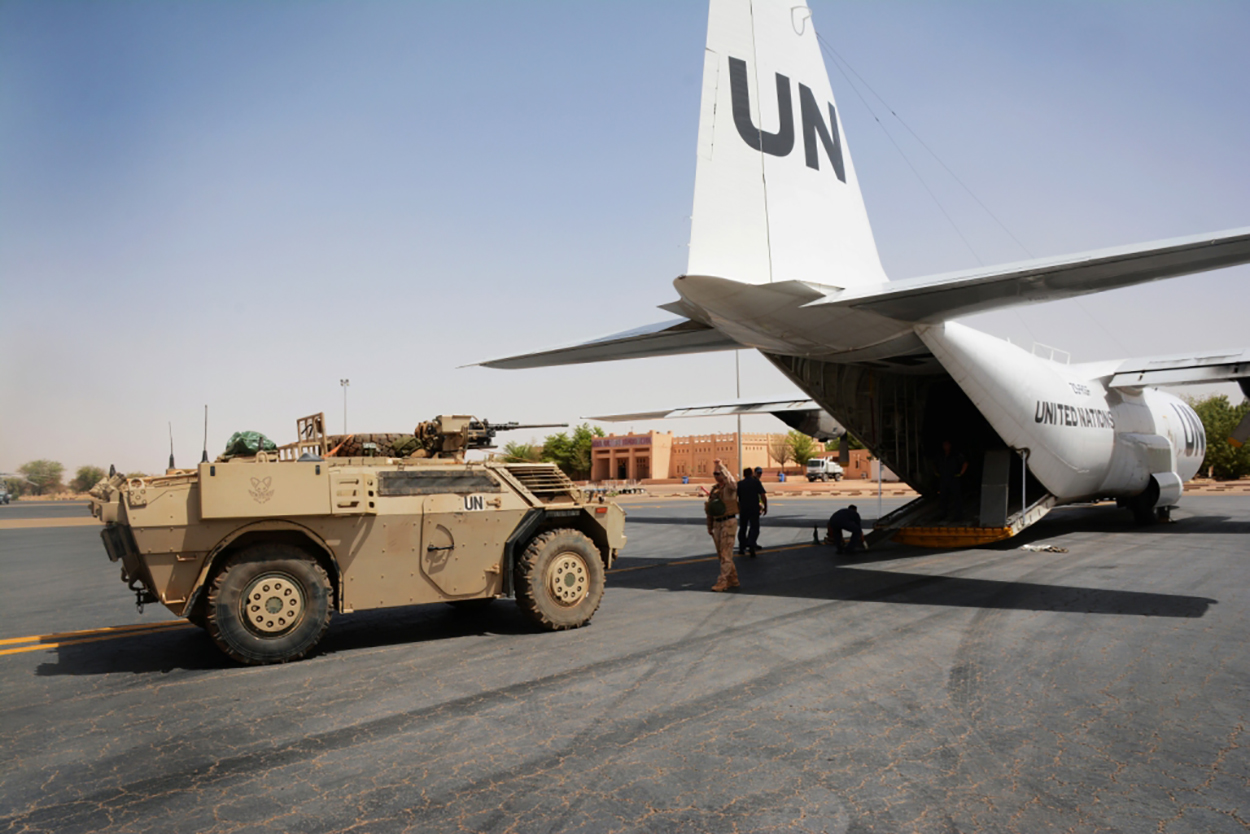
- Djinguereber Mosque Sankoré Madrasah The market of Timbuktu Fennek at the Timbuktu Airport

- Location of Timbuktu within Mali
- Coordinates: 16°46′33″N 3°00′34″W
- Country: Mali
- Region: Tombouctou Region
- Cercle: Timbuktu Cercle
- Settled: 5th century BCE
- City: 11th–12th century CE

Area
  - Land: 21 km^{2} (8.1 sq mi)
- Elevation: 261 m (856 ft)

Population (2023)
  - Total: 84,821
  - Density: 4,000/km^{2} (10,000/sq mi)
- Climate: BWh

UNESCO World Heritage Site
- Criteria: Cultural: ii, iv, v
- Reference: 119
- Inscription: 1988 (12th Session)
- Endangered: 1990–2005; 2012–present

Timbuktu (/ˌtɪmbʌkˈtuː/ TIM-buk-TOO; French: Tombouctou; Koyra Chiini: Tunbutu; Tuareg: ⵜⵏⵀⵗⵜ, romanized: Tin Bukt) is a city in Mali, situated 20 kilometres (12 miles) north of the Niger River. It is the capital of the Tombouctou Region, one of the 19 administrative regions of Mali, with a population of around eighty-four thousand people in the 2023 census.

Archaeological evidence suggests prehistoric settlements in the region, predating the city's Islamic scholarly and trade prominence in the medieval period. Timbuktu began as a seasonal settlement and became permanent early in the 12th century. After a shift in trading routes, particularly after the visit by Mansa Musa around 1325, Timbuktu flourished, due to its strategic location, from the trade in salt, gold, and ivory. It gradually expanded as an important Islamic city on the Saharan trade route and attracted many scholars and traders before it became part of the Mali Empire early in the 14th century. In the first half of the 15th century, the Tuareg people took control for a short period, until the expanding Songhai Empire absorbed it in 1468.

A Moroccan army defeated the Songhai in 1591 and made Timbuktu their capital. The invaders established a new ruling class, the Arma, who after 1612 became virtually independent of Morocco. In its golden age, the town's Islamic scholars and extensive trade network supported an important book trade. Together with the campuses of the Sankoré Madrasah, an Islamic university, this established Timbuktu as a scholarly centre in Africa. Notable historical writers, such as Shabeni and Leo Africanus, wrote about the city. These stories fuelled speculation in Europe, where the city's reputation shifted from being rich to mysterious. The city's golden age as a major learning and cultural centre of the Mali Empire was followed by a long period of decline. Different tribes governed until the French took over Mali in 1893. The colonial regime lasted until the country became the Republic of Mali in 1960.

In recent history, Timbuktu has faced threats from extremist groups leading to the destruction of cultural sites; efforts by local and international communities have aimed to preserve its heritage. The city's population has declined as a result of the recent issues.

== Toponymy ==
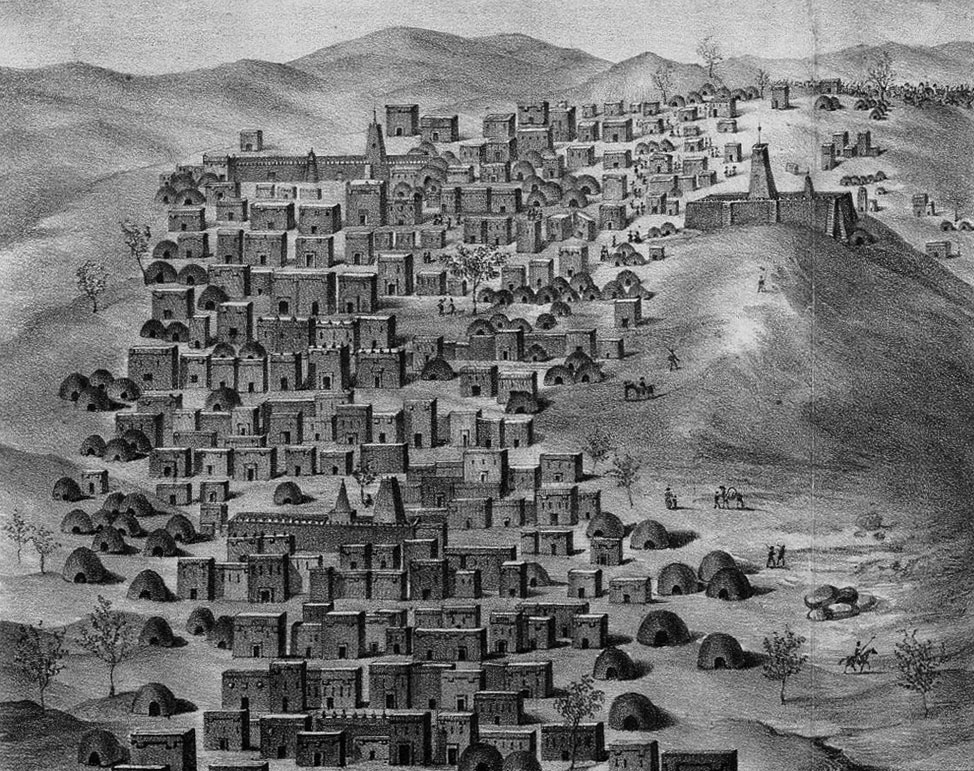
Timbuktu looking west, René Caillié (1830)

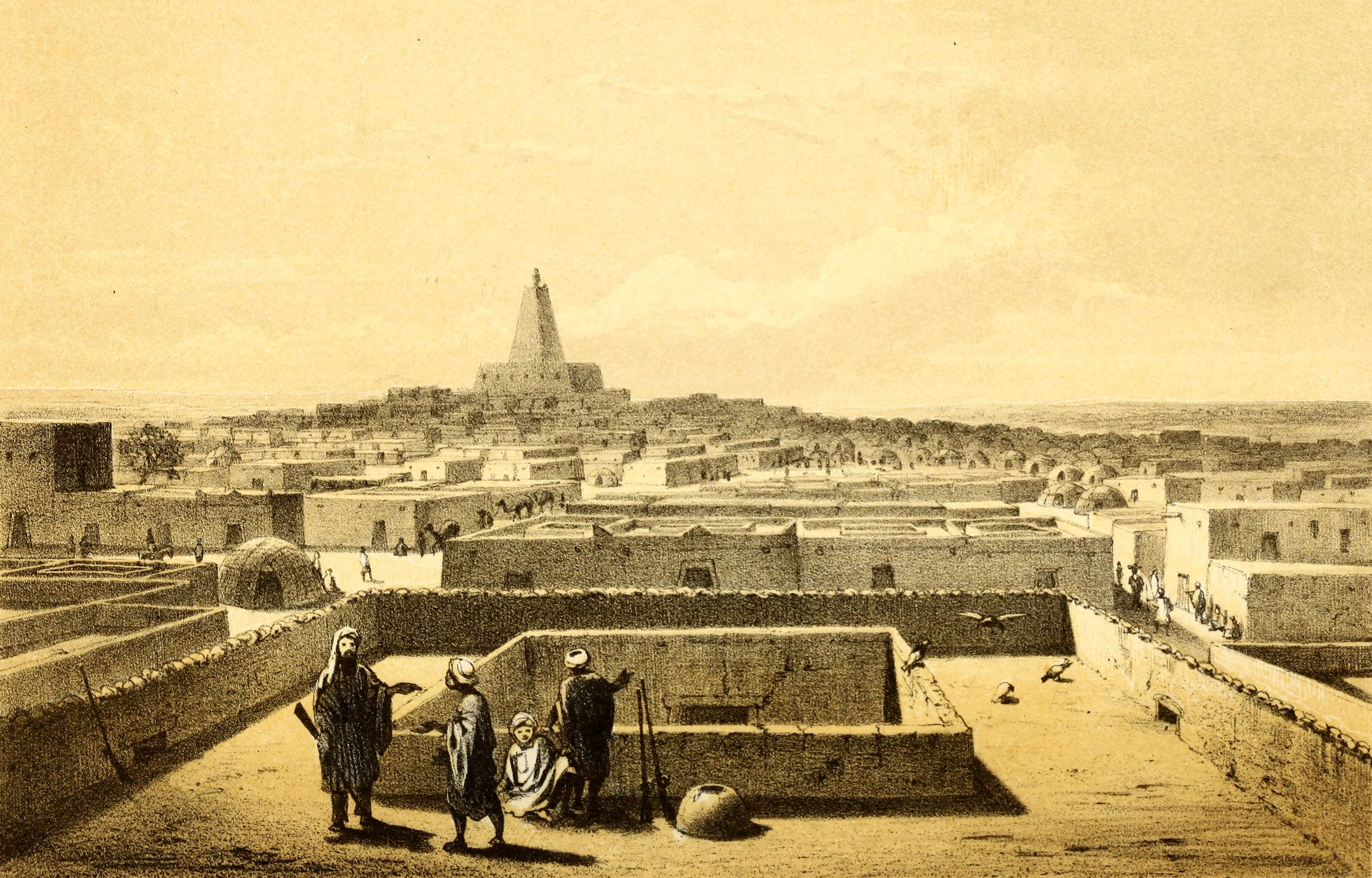
View of Timbuktu, Heinrich Barth (1858)

Over the centuries, the spelling of Timbuktu has varied a great deal: from Tenbuch on the Catalan Atlas (1375), to traveller Antonio Malfante's Thambet, used in a letter he wrote in 1447 and also adopted by Alvise Cadamosto in his Voyages of Cadamosto, to Heinrich Barth's Timbúktu and Timbu'ktu. French spelling often appears in international reference as 'Tombouctou'. The German spelling 'Timbuktu' and its variant 'Timbucktu' have passed into English and the former has become widely used in recent years. Major English-language works have employed the spelling 'Timbuctoo', and this is considered the correct English form by scholars; 'Timbuctou' and 'Timbuctu' are sometimes used as well.

The French continue to use the spelling 'Tombouctou', as they have for over a century; variants include 'Temboctou' (used by explorer René Caillié) and 'Tombouktou', but they are seldom seen. Variant spellings exist for other places as well, such as Jenne (Djenné) and Segu (Ségou). As well as its spelling, Timbuktu's toponymy is still open to discussion. (Note: "Timbuktu" – regardless of spelling, has long been used as a metaphor for "out in the middle of nowhere". E.g. "From here to Timbuktu and back.") At least four possible origins of the name of Timbuktu have been described:

- Songhay origin: both Leo Africanus and Heinrich Barth believed the name was derived from two Songhay words: Leo Africanus writes the Kingdom of Tombuto was named after a town of the same name, founded in 1213 or 1214 by Mansa Sulayman. The word itself consisted of two parts: tin (wall) and butu (Wall of Butu). Africanus did not explain the meaning of this Butu. Heinrich Barth wrote: "The town was probably so called, because it was built originally in a hollow or cavity in the sand-hills. Tùmbutu means hole or womb in the Songhay language: if it were a Temáshight (Tamashek) word, it would be written Timbuktu. The name is generally interpreted by Europeans as well of Buktu (also same word in Persian is bâkhtàr باختر = where the sun sets, West), but tin has nothing to do with well."
- Berber origin: Malian historian Sekene Cissoko proposes a different etymology: the Tuareg founders of the city gave it a Berber name, a word composed of two parts: tin, the feminine form of in (place of) and bouctou, a small dune. Hence, Timbuktu would mean "place covered by small dunes".
- Abd al-Sadi offers a third explanation in his 17th-century Tarikh al-Sudan: "The Tuareg made it a depot for their belongings and provisions, and it grew into a crossroads for travelers coming and going. Looking after their belongings was a slave woman of theirs called Tinbuktu, which in their language means [the one having a] 'lump'. The blessed spot where she encamped was named after her."
- The French Orientalist René Basset forwarded another theory: the name derives from the Zenaga root b-k-t, meaning "to be distant" or "hidden", and the feminine possessive particle tin. The meaning "hidden" could point to the city's location in a slight hollow.

The validity of these theories depends on the identity of the original founders of the city: as recently as 2000, archaeological research has not found remains dating from the 11th/12th century within the limits of the modern city given the difficulty of excavating through metres of sand that have buried the remains over the past centuries. Without consensus, the etymology of Timbuktu remains unclear.

== Prehistory ==
Like other important Medieval West African towns such as Djenné (Jenné-Jeno), Gao, and Dia, Iron Age settlements have been discovered near Timbuktu that predate the traditional foundation date of the town. Although the accumulation of thick layers of sand has thwarted archaeological excavations in the town itself, some of the surrounding landscape is deflating and exposing pottery shards on the surface. A survey of the area by Susan and Roderick McIntosh in 1984 identified several Iron Age sites along the el-Ahmar, an ancient wadi system that passes a few kilometers to the east of the modern town.

An Iron Age tell complex located nine kilometres (5 1/2 mi) southeast of the Timbuktu near the Wadi el-Ahmar was excavated between 2008 and 2010 by archaeologists from Yale University and the Mission Culturelle de Tombouctou. The results suggest that the site was first occupied during the 5th century BC, thrived throughout the second half of the 1st millennium AD and eventually collapsed sometime during the late 10th or early 11th-century AD. The Maghsharan Tuareg is credited with the founding of Timbuktu.

== History ==
Timbuktu has acquired a reputation in the Western world as an exotic, mysterious place, but the city was once a well known trade center and an academic hotspot of the medieval world. Timbuktu reached its golden age under the Mali Empire in the 13th and 14th centuries. Distinguished Malian Mansa Mūsā brought great fame to the city by recruiting scholars from throughout the Islamic world to travel there, establishing it as a center of learning. The scholars focused not only on Islamic studies, but also history, rhetoric, law, science, and, most notably, medicine. Mansa Mūsā also introduced Timbuktu, and the Mali Empire in general, to the rest of the medieval world through his Hajj, as his time in Mecca would soon inspire Arab travelers to visit North Africa. Europeans, however, would not reach the city until much later, due to the difficult and lengthy journey, thus garnering the city a reputation of mystery.

Timbuktu primarily gained its wealth from local gold and salt mining, in addition to the trans-Saharan slave trade. Gold was a highly valued commodity in the Mediterranean region and salt was most popular south of the city, though arguably the biggest asset Timbuktu had was its location. The city is situated nine miles from the Niger River, making for good agricultural land. Its position near the edge of the Sahara Desert made it a hub for trans-Saharan trade routes. Timbuktu also acts as a midpoint between the regions of North, West, and Central Africa. Because of this, Timbuktu developed into a cultural melting pot.

The Mali Empire reached a steady decline in the mid-1400s, giving rise to the Songhai Empire. However, the city of Timbuktu entered a brief period of rule under the Tuaregs before it fell to the Songhai people. Despite major shifts in power, Timbuktu generally flourished until the Moroccans invaded the Songhai Empire in 1590 and began to occupy Timbuktu in 1591, after the Battle of Tondibi. In 1593, many of the city's scholars were executed or exiled for disloyalty to the new rulers. This, along with a decline in trade as a result of increased competition from newly available trans-Atlantic sailing routes, caused the city to lose its prominence. In the 1890s Timbuktu was formally incorporated into the French colony of Sudan, remaining under French control until the colony became the independent nation of Mali in 1960.

Today, the population of Timbuktu has substantially decreased since its estimated peak of 100,000 people in the medieval period. The city has suffered from great poverty for several years now, relying on government funding as a means of survival. Timbuktu is ruled by Mali's national government, led by Colonel Assimi Goïta, which consists of a president, prime minister, and the National Transitional Council. All branches are currently under a military junta that began due to a coup in 2020 and another in 2021.

=== Siege of Timbuktu ===
On 8 August 2023, in an attack on Mali's government, Timbuktu was brought under a total blockade by the al-Qaeda ally Jama'at Nasr al-Islam wal Muslimin (JNIM), exacerbating poverty, raising prices, and leading to food shortages. 33,000 fled the city and its surrounding areas and 1,000 have fled to Mauritania since the start of the siege. The siege began after the withdrawal of MINUSMA, the United Nations mission to Mali during the Mali War, and is classified as ongoing.

== Geography ==
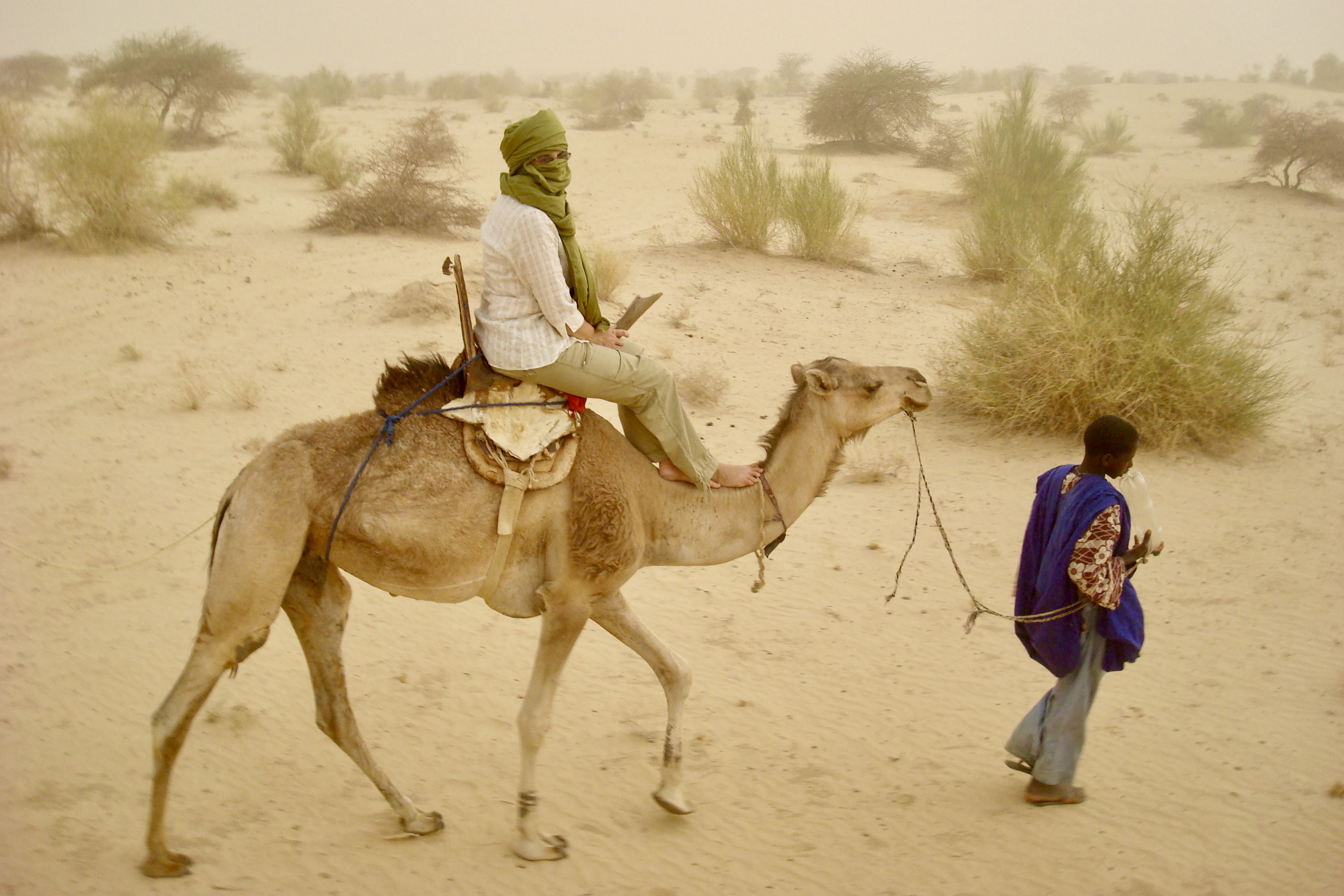
A camel ride in the Sahara desert, outside Timbuktu

Timbuktu is located on the southern edge of the Sahara 15 km (9 1/2 mi) north of the main channel of the River Niger. The town is surrounded by sand dunes and the streets are covered in sand. The port of Kabara is 8 km (5 mi) to the south of the town and is connected to an arm of the river by a 3 km (2 mi) canal. The canal had become heavily silted but in 2007 it was dredged as part of a Libyan financed project.

The annual flood of the Niger River is a result of the heavy rainfall in the headwaters of the Niger and Bani rivers in Guinea and northern Ivory Coast. The rainfall in these areas peaks in August but the floodwater takes time to pass down the river system and through the Inner Niger Delta. At Koulikoro, 60 km (37 mi) downstream from Bamako, the flood peaks in September, while in Timbuktu the flood lasts longer and usually reaches a maximum at the end of December.

The area flooded by the river was once more extensive and in years with high rainfall, floodwater reached the western outskirts of Timbuktu itself. A small navigable creek to the west of the town is shown on the maps published by Heinrich Barth in 1857 and Félix Dubois in 1896. Between 1917 and 1921, during the colonial period, the French used slave labour to dig a narrow canal linking Timbuktu with Kabara. Over the following decades this canal became silted and filled with sand, but in 2007 the canal was re-excavated as part of the dredging project so that now when the River Niger floods, Timbuktu is again connected to Kabara. The Malian government has promised to address problems with the design of the canal as it currently lacks footbridges and the steep, unstable banks make access to the water difficult.

Kabara can function as a port only in December and January when the river is in full flood. When the water levels are lower boats dock at Korioumé, which is linked to Timbuktu by 18 km (11 mi) of paved road.

=== Climate ===
Timbuktu features a hot desert climate (BWh) according to the Köppen Climate Classification. The weather is extremely hot and dry throughout much of the year, with most of the city's rainfall occurring between June and September due to the influence of the West African Monsoon. The degree of diurnal temperature variation is higher in the dry season than the wet season. Average daily maximum temperatures in the hottest months of the year – April, May and June – exceed 40 °C (104 °F). Lowest temperatures occur during the mildest months of the year – December, January and February. Average maximum temperatures do not drop below 30 °C (86 °F). These winter months are characterized by a dry, dusty trade wind blowing from the Saharan Tibesti Region southward to the Gulf of Guinea. Picking up dust particles on their way, these winds limit visibility in what has been dubbed the "Harmattan Haze." Additionally, when the dust settles in the city, sand builds up and desertification looms.

Climate data for Timbuktu (1950–2000, extremes 1897–present)
Month	Jan	Feb	Mar	Apr	May	Jun	Jul	Aug	Sep	Oct	Nov	Dec	Year
Record high °C (°F)	41.6 (106.9)	43.5 (110.3)	46.1 (115.0)	48.9 (120.0)	49.0 (120.2)	49.0 (120.2)	46.0 (114.8)	46.5 (115.7)	45.0 (113.0)	48.0 (118.4)	42.5 (108.5)	40.0 (104.0)	49.0 (120.2)
Mean daily maximum °C (°F)	30.0 (86.0)	33.2 (91.8)	36.6 (97.9)	40.0 (104.0)	42.2 (108.0)	41.6 (106.9)	38.5 (101.3)	36.5 (97.7)	38.3 (100.9)	39.1 (102.4)	35.2 (95.4)	30.4 (86.7)	36.8 (98.2)
Daily mean °C (°F)	21.5 (70.7)	24.2 (75.6)	27.6 (81.7)	31.3 (88.3)	34.1 (93.4)	34.5 (94.1)	32.2 (90.0)	30.7 (87.3)	31.6 (88.9)	30.9 (87.6)	26.5 (79.7)	22.0 (71.6)	28.9 (84.0)
Mean daily minimum °C (°F)	13.0 (55.4)	15.2 (59.4)	18.5 (65.3)	22.5 (72.5)	26.0 (78.8)	27.3 (81.1)	25.8 (78.4)	24.8 (76.6)	24.8 (76.6)	22.7 (72.9)	17.7 (63.9)	13.5 (56.3)	21.0 (69.8)
Record low °C (°F)	1.7 (35.1)	7.5 (45.5)	7.0 (44.6)	8.0 (46.4)	18.5 (65.3)	17.4 (63.3)	18.0 (64.4)	20.0 (68.0)	18.9 (66.0)	13.0 (55.4)	11.0 (51.8)	3.5 (38.3)	1.7 (35.1)
Average rainfall mm (inches)	0.6 (0.02)	0.1 (0.00)	0.1 (0.00)	1.0 (0.04)	4.0 (0.16)	16.4 (0.65)	53.5 (2.11)	73.6 (2.90)	29.4 (1.16)	3.8 (0.15)	0.1 (0.00)	0.2 (0.01)	182.8 (7.20)
Average rainy days (≥ 0.1 mm)	0.1	0.1	0.1	0.6	0.9	3.2	6.6	8.1	4.7	0.8	0.0	0.1	25.3
Mean monthly sunshine hours	263.9	249.6	269.9	254.6	275.3	234.7	248.6	255.3	248.9	273.0	274.0	258.7	3,106.5
Source 1: World Meteorological Organization, NOAA (sun 1961–1990)
Source 2: Meteo Climat (record highs and lows)

== Economy ==
=== Salt trade ===
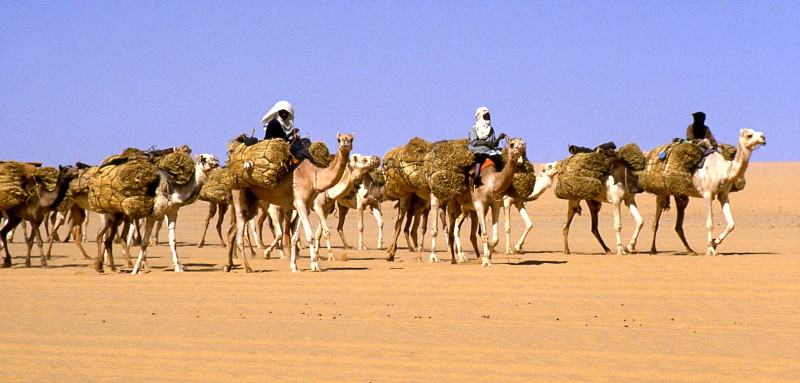
Azalai salt caravan, mid-December 1985

The wealth and very existence of Timbuktu depended on its position as the southern terminus of an important trans-Saharan trade route; nowadays, the only goods that are routinely transported across the desert are slabs of rock salt brought from the Taoudenni mining centre in the central Sahara 664 km (413 mi) north of Timbuktu. Until the second half of the 20th century most of the slabs were transported by large salt caravans or azalai, one leaving Timbuktu in early November and the other in late March.

The caravans of several thousand camels took three weeks each way, transporting food to the miners and returning with each camel loaded with four or five 30 kg (66 lb) slabs of salt. The salt transport was largely controlled by desert nomads of the Arabic-speaking Berabich (or Barabish) tribe. Although there are no roads, the slabs of salt are now usually transported from Taoudenni by truck. From Timbuktu the salt is transported by boat to other towns in Mali.

Between the 12th and 14th centuries, Timbuktu's population grew immensely due to an influx of Bono, Tuaregs, Fulanis, and Songhais seeking trade, security, or to study. By 1300, the population increased to 10,000 and continued increasing until it reached about 50,000 in the 1500s.

=== Agriculture ===
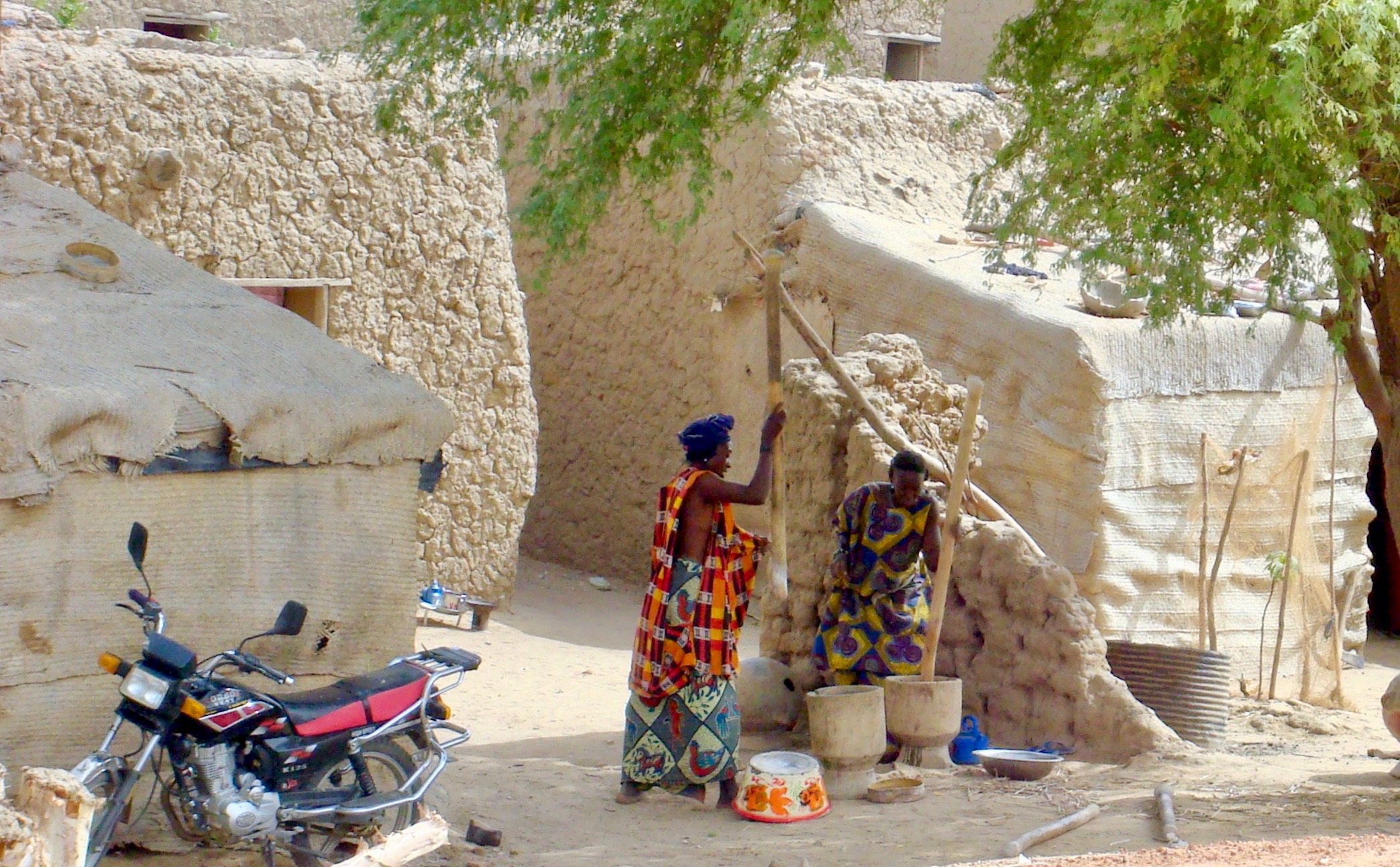
Women pounding grain

There is insufficient rainfall in the Timbuktu region for purely rain-fed agriculture and crops are therefore irrigated using water from the River Niger. The main agricultural crop is rice. African floating rice (Oryza glaberrima) has traditionally been grown in regions near the river that are inundated during the annual flood. Seed is sown at the beginning of the rainy season (June–July) so that when the flood water arrives plants are already 30 to 40 cm (12 to 16 in) in height.

The plants grow up to three metres (10 feet) in height as the water level rises. The rice is harvested by canoe in December. The procedure is very precarious and the yields are low but the method has the advantage that little capital investment is required. A successful crop depends critically on the amount and timing of the rain in the wet season and the height of the flood. To a limited extent the arrival of the flood water can be controlled by the construction of small mud dikes that become submerged as the water rises.

Although floating rice is still cultivated in the Timbuktu Cercle, most of the rice is now grown in three relatively large irrigated areas that lie to the south of the town: Daye (392 ha), Koriomé (550 ha) and Hamadja (623 ha). Water is pumped from the river using ten large Archimedes' screws which were first installed in the 1990s. The irrigated areas are run as cooperatives with approximately 2,100 families cultivating small plots. Nearly all the rice produced is consumed by the families themselves. The yields are still relatively low and the farmers are being encouraged to change their agricultural practices.

=== Tourism ===
Most tourists visit Timbuktu between November and February when the air temperature is lower. In the 1980s, accommodation for tourists was provided by Hendrina Khan Hotel and two other small hotels: Hotel Bouctou and Hotel Azalaï. Over the following decades the tourist numbers increased so that by 2006 there were seven small hotels and guest houses. The town benefited by the revenue from the CFA 5,000 tourist tax, the sale of handicrafts and employment of local guides.

==== Attacks ====
Starting in 2008, al-Qaeda in the Islamic Maghreb began kidnapping groups of tourists in the Sahel region. In January 2009, four tourists were kidnapped near the Mali–Niger border after attending a cultural festival at Anderamboukané. One of these tourists was subsequently murdered. As a result of this and various other incidents a number of states including France, Britain and the US, began advising their citizens to avoid travelling far from Bamako. The number of tourists visiting Timbuktu dropped precipitously from around 6,000 in 2009 to only 492 in the first four months of 2011.

Because of the security concerns, the Malian government moved the 2010 Festival in the Desert from Essakane to the outskirts of Timbuktu. In November 2011, gunmen attacked tourists staying at a hotel in Timbuktu, killing one of them and kidnapping three others. This was the first terrorist incident in Timbuktu itself.

On 1 April 2012, one day after the capture of Gao, Timbuktu was captured from the Malian military by the Tuareg rebels of the MNLA and Ansar Dine. Five days later, the MNLA declared the region independent of Mali as the nation of Azawad. The declared political entity was not recognized by any regional nations or the international community and it collapsed three months later on 12 July.

On 28 January 2013, French and Malian government troops began retaking Timbuktu from the Islamist rebels. The force of 1,000 French troops with 200 Malian soldiers retook Timbuktu without a fight. The Islamist groups had already fled north a few days earlier, having set fire to the Ahmed Baba Institute, which housed many important manuscripts. The building housing the Ahmed Baba Institute was funded by South Africa, and held 30,000 manuscripts. BBC World Service radio news reported on 29 January 2013 that approximately 28,000 of the manuscripts in the Institute had been removed to safety from the premises before the attack by the Islamist groups, and that the whereabouts of about 2,000 manuscripts remained unknown. It was intended to be a resource for Islamic research.

On 30 March 2013, jihadist rebels infiltrated Timbuktu nine days before a suicide bombing on a Malian army checkpoint at the international airport, killing a soldier. Fighting lasted until 1 April, when French warplanes helped Malian ground forces chase the remaining rebels out of the city center.

On 2 June 2025, JNIM militants attacked a military base near the city. The attack began with a car packed with explosives. The airport was also shelled by mortars. Officials later reported that the operations around the military base had concluded, but that attackers were still present throughout the city. The Malian army reported that 14 attackers were neutralized and 31 suspected terrorists were arrested.

== Early accounts in the West ==
Descriptions of Timbuktu's wealth contributed to European exploration along the west coast of Africa. Historical accounts of the city include those written by Leo Africanus and Shabeni.

=== Leo Africanus ===
Perhaps most famous among the accounts written about Timbuktu is that by Leo Africanus, born El Hasan ben Muhammed el- Wazzan-ez-Zayyati in Granada in 1485. His family was among the thousands of Muslims expelled by King Ferdinand and Queen Isabel after their reconquest of Spain in 1492. They settled in Morocco, where he studied in Fes and accompanied his uncle on diplomatic missions throughout North Africa. During these travels, he visited Timbuktu. As a young man he was captured by pirates and presented as an exceptionally learned slave to Pope Leo X, who freed him, baptized him under the name "Johannis Leo de Medici", and commissioned him to write, in Italian, a detailed survey of Africa. His accounts provided most of what Europeans knew about the continent for the next several centuries. Describing Timbuktu when the Songhai Empire was at its height, the English edition of his book includes the description:

The rich king of Tombuto hath many plates and sceptres of gold, some whereof weigh 1300 pounds. ... He hath always 3000 horsemen ... (and) a great store of doctors, judges, priests, and other learned men, that are bountifully maintained at the king's cost and charges.

— Leo Africanus, Descrittione dell' Africa

According to Leo Africanus, there were abundant supplies of locally produced grain, cattle, milk and butter, though there were neither gardens nor orchards surrounding the city. In another passage dedicated to describing the wealth of both the environment and the king, Africanus touches upon the rarity of one of Timbuktu's trade commodities: salt.

The inhabitants are very rich, especially the strangers who have settled in the country [..] But salt is in very short supply because it is carried here from Tegaza, some 500 miles [800 km] from Timbuktu. I happened to be in this city at a time when a load of salt sold for eighty ducats. The king has a rich treasure of coins and gold ingots.

— Leo Africanus, Descrittione dell' Africa in Paul Brians' Reading About the World, Volume 2

These descriptions and passages alike caught the attention of European explorers. Africanus also described the more mundane aspects of the city, such as the "cottages built of chalk, and covered with thatch" – although these went largely unheeded.

=== Shabeni ===
The natives of the town of Timbuctoo may be computed at 40,000, exclusive of slaves and foreigners ... The natives are all blacks: almost every stranger marries a female of the town, who are so beautiful that travellers often fall in love with them at first sight.

— Shabeni in James Grey Jackson's An Account of Timbuctoo and Hausa, 1820

Roughly 250 years after Leo Africanus' visit to Timbuktu, the city had seen many rulers. The end of the 18th century saw the grip of the Moroccan rulers on the city wane, resulting in a period of unstable government by quickly changing tribes. During the rule of one of those tribes, the Hausa, a 14-year-old child named Shabeni (or Shabeeny) from Tetuan on the north coast of Morocco accompanied his father on a visit to Timbuktu.

Shabeni stayed in Timbuktu for three years before moving to a major city called Housa (Note: A paper from 1995 says this was "apparently one of the Maraka towns". A book of letters to Thomas Jefferson mentions in connexion to a letter of 1798 that explorer Mungo Park had tried unsuccessfully to find Housa and Timbuktu (1795–7). In a later expedition he went near Timbuktu while descending the Niger River. After being attacked many times by Africans he drowned in the river.) several days' journey to the southeast. Two years later, he returned to Timbuktu to live there for another seven years – one of a population that was, even centuries after its peak and excluding slaves, double the size of the 21st-century town.

By the time Shabeni was 27, he was an established merchant in his hometown of Tetuan. He made a two-year pilgrimage to Mecca and thus became a hajji, Asseed El Hage Abd Salam Shabeeny. Returning from a trading voyage to Hamburg, he was captured by a ship manned by Englishmen but sailing under a Russian flag, whose captain claimed that his Imperial mistress (Catherine the Great) was "at war with all Muselmen" (see Russo-Turkish War (1787–1792)). He and the ship he had been sailing in were brought to Ostend in Belgium in December 1789 but the British consul managed to get him and the ship released. He set off again in the same ship, but the captain, who claimed to be afraid of his ship being captured again, set him ashore in Dover. In England his story was recorded. Shabeeni gave an indication of the size of the city in the second half of the 18th century. In an earlier passage, he described an environment that was characterized by forest, as opposed to the modern arid surroundings.

== Arts and culture ==
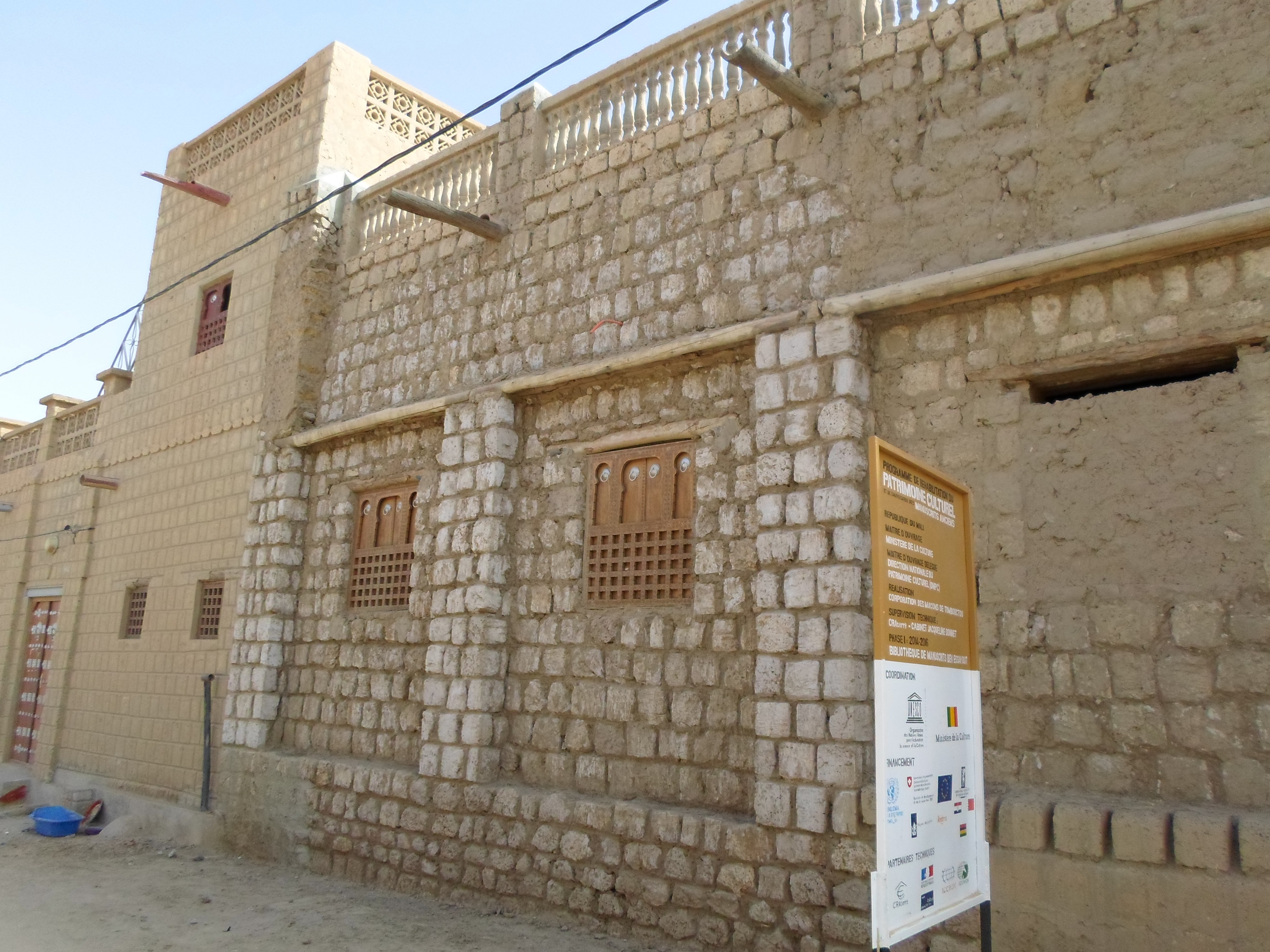
Reconstruction of the Ben Essayouti Library, Timbuktu

=== The mosques ===
Timbuktu has significant architectural landmarks, including three mosques: Djinguereber, Sankoré and Sidi Yahya.

==== Djinguereber ====
The Djinguereber Mosque was built in 1327 under Mansa Musa. Mansa Musa's pilgrimage to Mecca, during which he distributed vast amounts of gold, contributed to the construction of the mosque and established Timbuktu's as a centre of Islamic scholarship. The mosque underwent restoration efforts in 2006 due to dangers resulting from sand encroachment.

==== Sankoré ====
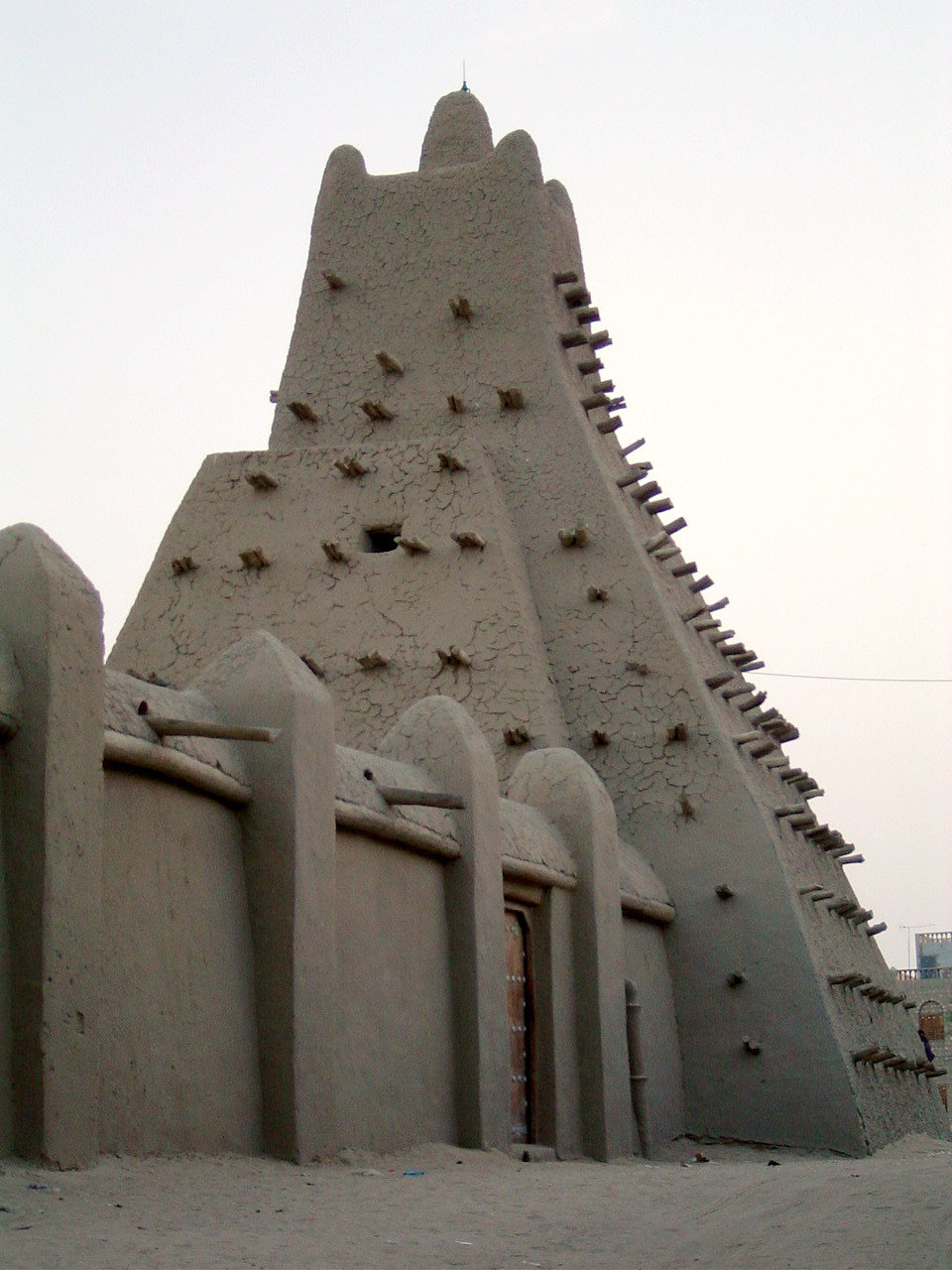
Sankore Mosque

The Sankoré Madrasah, also called the Sankoré Mosque, was built in the 14th-15th century and played a central role in Timbuktu's intellectual and educational landscape. Its libraries housed thousands of manuscripts on subjects ranging from theology to astronomy.

==== Sidi Yahya ====
The Sidi Yahya Mosque, founded in 1400 by Sheikh El-Mokhtar Hamalla, held both religious and mystical significance for the people of Timbuktu. It was named after its first Imam, Sidi Yahya al-Tadelsi. The Sidi Yahya mosque is one of the oldest mosques in Timbuktu. Construction was completed in 1440.

=== Cultural events ===
The best-known cultural event is the Festival au Désert. When the Tuareg rebellion ended in 1996 under the Konaré administration, 3,000 weapons were burned in a ceremony dubbed the Flame of Peace on 29 March 2007 – to commemorate the ceremony, a monument was built. The Festival au Désert, to celebrate the peace treaty, was held every January in the desert, 75 km from the city until 2010.

The week-long festival of Mawloud is held every January, and celebrates the birthday of Muhammed; the city's "most cherished manuscripts" are read publicly, and are a central part of this celebration. It was originally a Shi'ite festival from Persia and arriving in Timbuktu around 1600. The "most joyful occasion on Timbuktu's calendar", it combines "rituals of Sufi Islam with celebrating Timbuktu's rich literary traditions". It is a "period of feasting, singing, and dancing ... It culminated with an evening gathering of thousands of people in the large sandy square in front of the Sankor é Mosque and a public reading of some of the city's most treasured manuscripts."

Annually, during the winter, Timbuktu has hosted the Living Together festival since 2015.

=== World Heritage Site ===
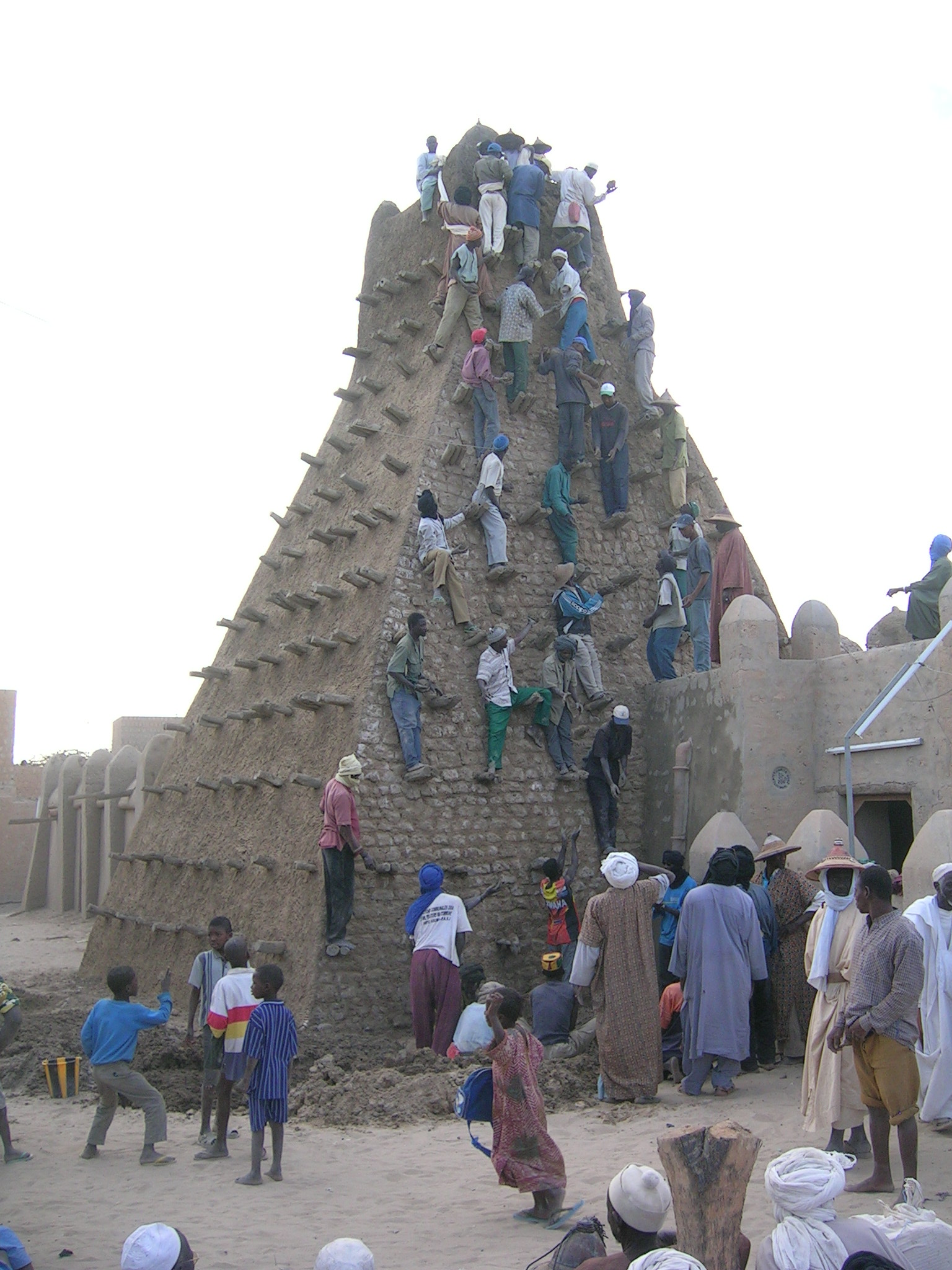
The mausoleums, erected in the 15th and 16th centuries, being restored by local workers

During its twelfth session, in December 1988, the World Heritage Committee (WHC) selected parts of Timbuktu's historic centre for inscription on its World Heritage list. The selection was based on three criteria:

- Criterion II: Timbuktu's holy places were vital to early Islamization in Africa.
- Criterion IV: Timbuktu's mosques show a cultural and scholarly Golden Age during the Songhai Empire.
- Criterion V: The construction of the mosques, still mostly original, shows the use of traditional building techniques.

An earlier nomination in 1979 failed the following year as it lacked proper demarcation: the Malian government included the town of Timbuktu as a whole in the wish for inclusion. Close to a decade later, three mosques and 16 mausoleums or cemeteries were selected from the Old Town for World Heritage status: with this conclusion came the call for protection of the buildings' conditions, an exclusion of new construction works near the sites and measures against the encroaching sand.

Shortly afterwards, the monuments were placed on the List of World Heritage in Danger by the Malian government, as by the selection committee at the time of nomination. The first period on the Danger List lasted from 1990 until 2005, when a range of measures including restoration work and the compilation of an inventory warranted "its removal from the Danger List". In 2008 the WHC placed the protected area under increased scrutiny dubbed "reinforced monitoring", a measure made possible in 2007, as the impact of planned construction work was unclear. Special attention was given to the build of a cultural centre.

During a session in June 2009, UNESCO decided to cease its increased monitoring program as it felt sufficient progress had been made to address the initial concerns. Following the takeover of Timbuktu by MNLA and the Islamist group Ansar Dine, it was returned to the List of World Heritage in Danger in 2012.

Many of the current conservation efforts are undertaken by "traditional actors" in the community. Some of their efforts include managing and restoring the historic mosques in the city.

==== Attacks by radical Islamic groups ====
In May 2012, Ansar Dine destroyed a shrine in the city and in June 2012, in the aftermath of the Battle of Gao and Timbuktu, other shrines, including the mausoleum of Sidi Mahmoud, were destroyed when attacked with shovels and pickaxes by members of the same group. Additionally, manuscripts from the Ahmed Baba Research Centre were taken or damaged. An Ansar Dine spokesman said that all shrines in the city, including the 13 remaining World Heritage sites, would be destroyed because they consider them to be examples of idolatry, a sin in Islam. These acts have been described as crimes against humanity and war crimes. After the destruction of the tombs, UNESCO created a special fund to safeguard Mali's World Heritage Sites, vowing to carry out reconstruction and rehabilitation projects once the security situation allows.

== Education ==
If the University of Sankore ... had survived the ravages of foreign invasions, the academic and cultural history of Africa might have been different from what it is today.

— Kwame Nkrumah at the University of Ghana inauguration, 1961

=== Centre of learning ===
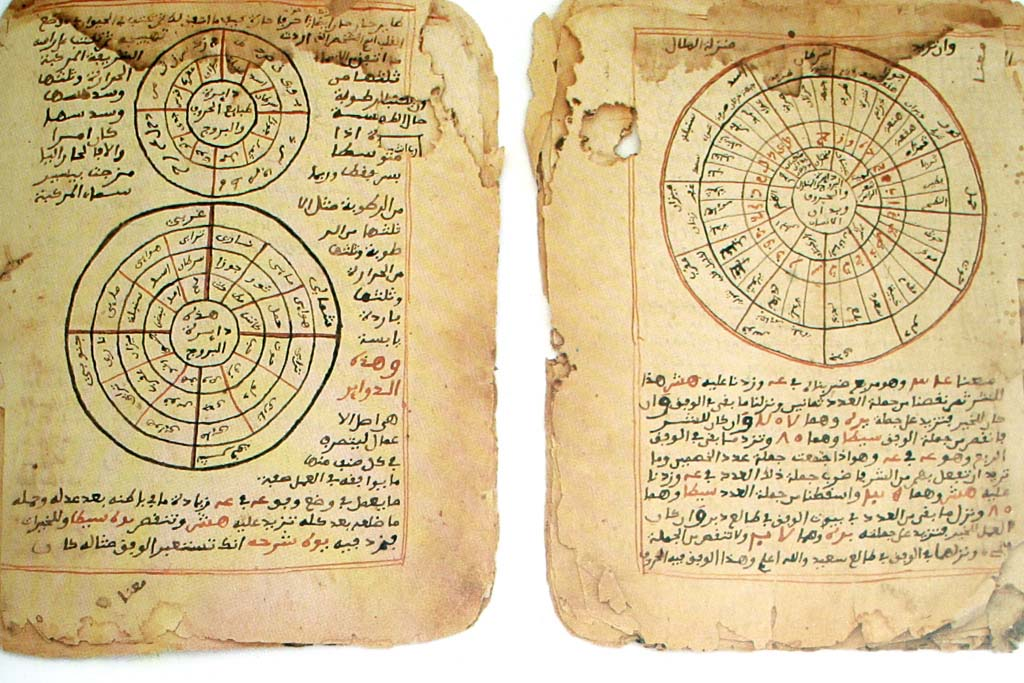
Pages of the Timbuktu Manuscripts, showing both mathematics and a heritage of astronomy in medieval Islam

Timbuktu was a world centre of Islamic learning from the 13th to the 17th century, especially under the Mali Empire and Askia Mohammad I's rule. The Malian government and NGOs have been working to catalogue and restore the remnants of this scholarly legacy: Timbuktu's manuscripts.

Timbuktu's rapid economic growth in the 13th and 14th centuries drew many scholars from nearby Walata (today in Mauritania), leading up to the city's golden age in the 15th and 16th centuries that proved fertile ground for scholarship of religions, arts and sciences. To the people of Timbuktu, literacy and books were symbols of wealth, power, and blessings and the acquisition of books became a primary concern for scholars. An active trade in books between Timbuktu and other parts of the Islamic world and emperor Askia Mohammed's strong support led to the writing of thousands of manuscripts.

Knowledge was gathered in a manner similar to the early, informal European Medieval university model. Lecturing was presented through a range of informal institutions called madrasahs. Nowadays known as the University of Timbuktu, three madrasahs facilitated 25,000 students: Djinguereber, Sidi Yahya and Sankore.

These institutions were explicitly religious, as opposed to the more secular curricula of modern European universities and more similar to the medieval Europe model. However, where universities in the European sense started as associations of students and teachers, West-African education was patronized by families or lineages, with the Aqit and Bunu al-Qadi al-Hajj families being two of the most prominent in Timbuktu – these families also facilitated students in set-aside rooms in their housings. Although the basis of Islamic law and its teaching were brought to Timbuktu from North Africa with the spread of Islam, Western African scholarship developed: Ahmad Baba al Massufi is regarded as the city's greatest scholar.

Timbuktu served in this process as a distribution centre of scholars and scholarship. Its reliance on trade meant intensive movement of scholars between the city and its extensive network of trade partners. In 1468–1469 though, many scholars left for Walata when Sunni Ali's Songhay Empire absorbed Timbuktu. Then, in the 1591 Moroccan invasion of Timbuktu, scholars had to flee once more, or face imprisonment or murder.

This system of education survived until the late 19th century, while the 18th century saw the institution of itinerant Quranic school as a form of universal education, where scholars would travel throughout the region with their students, begging for food part of the day. Islamic education came under pressure after the French occupation, droughts in the 1970s and 1980s and by Mali's civil war in the early 1990s.

=== Manuscripts and libraries ===
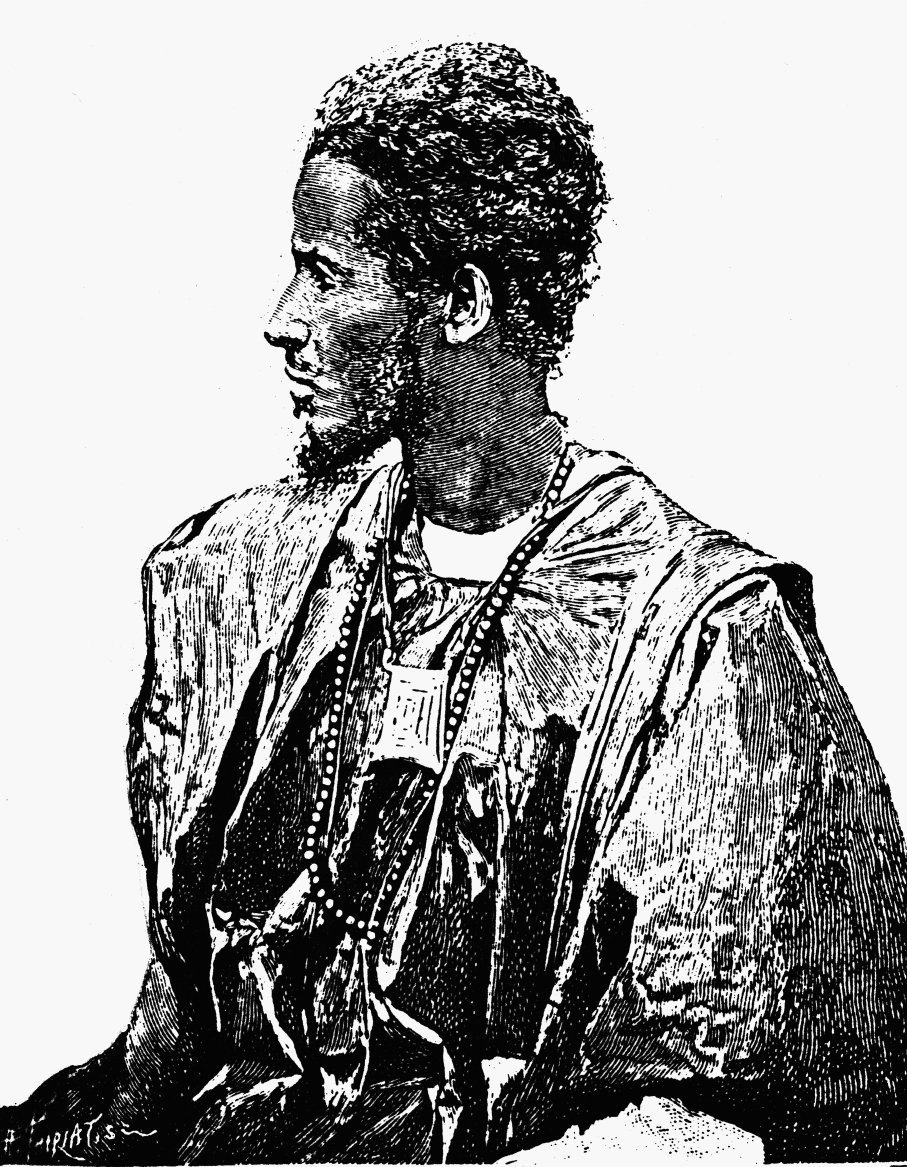
Moorish marabout of the Kuntua tribe, an ethnic Kounta clan, from which the Al Kounti manuscript collection derives its name. Dated 1898.

Hundreds of thousands of manuscripts were collected in Timbuktu over the course of centuries: some were written in the town itself, others – including exclusive copies of the Quran for wealthy families – imported through the lively booktrade. Hidden in cellars or buried, hid between the mosque's mud walls and safeguarded by their patrons, many of these manuscripts survived the city's decline. They now form the collection of several libraries in Timbuktu, holding up to 700,000 manuscripts in 2003. They include the Ahmed Baba Institute, Mamma Haidara Library, Fondo Kati, Al-Wangari Library, Mohamed Tahar Library, Maigala Library, Boularaf Collection, and Al Kounti Collections. These libraries are the largest among up to 60 private or public libraries that are estimated to exist in Timbuktu today, although some comprise little more than a row of books on a shelf or a bookchest. Under these circumstances, the manuscripts are vulnerable to damage and theft, as well as long term climate damage, despite Timbuktu's arid climate. Two Timbuktu Manuscripts Projects funded by independent universities have aimed to preserve them.

In late January 2013 it was reported that rebel forces destroyed many of the manuscripts before leaving the city. "On Friday morning, 25 January 2013, fifteen jihadis entered the restoration and conservation rooms on the ground floor of the Ahmed Baba Institute in Sankoré ... The men swept 4,202 manuscripts off lab tables and shelves, and carried them into the tiled courtyard ... They doused the manuscripts in gasoline ... and tossed in a lit match. The brittle pages and their dry leather covers ... were consumed by the inferno." However, there was no malicious destruction of any library or collection as most of the manuscripts were safely hidden away. 90% of these manuscripts were saved by the librarian Adbel Kader Haidara and the population organized around the NGO "Sauvegarde et valorisation des manuscrits pour la défense de la culture islamique" (SAVAMA-DCI). Some 350,000 manuscripts were transported to safety, and 300,000 of them were still in Bamako in 2022.

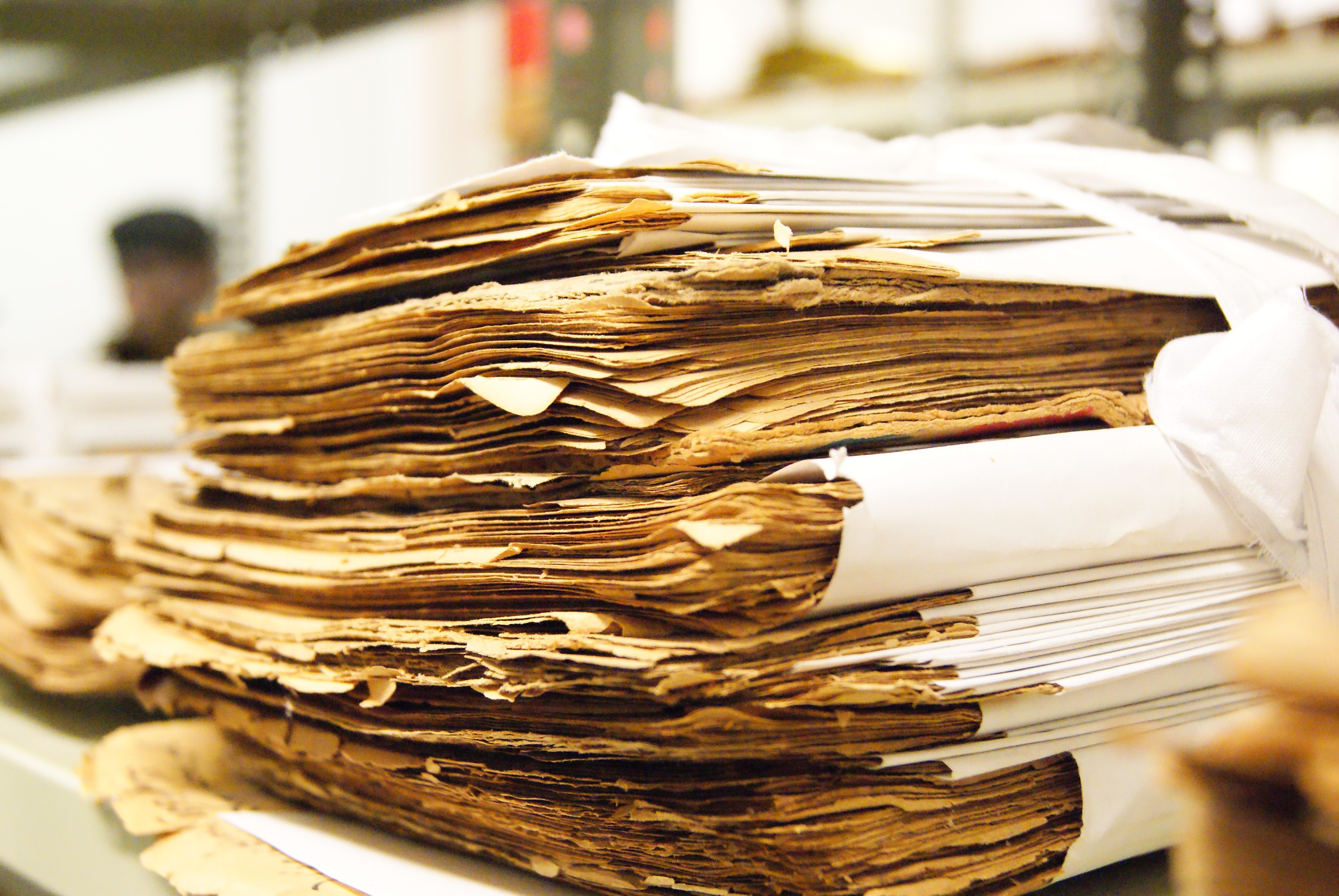
Manuscripts of the Ahmed Baba Centre

During the occupation by Islamic extremists, the city's citizens embarked on a drive to save the "best written accounts of African History". Interviewed by Time magazine, the local residents claimed to have safeguarded the three hundred thousand manuscripts for generations. Many of these documents are still in the safe-keeping of the local residents, who are reluctant to give them over to the government-run Ahmed Baba Institute housed in a modern digitalization building built by the South African government in 2009. The institute houses only 10% of the manuscripts. It was later confirmed by Jean-Michel Djian to The New Yorker that "the great majority of the manuscripts, about fifty thousand, are actually housed in the thirty-two family libraries of the 'City of 333 Saints'". He added, "Those are to this day protected." He also added that due to the massive efforts of one individual, two hundred thousand other manuscripts were successfully transported to safety. This effort was organized by Abdel Kader Haidara, then director of Mamma Haidara Library, using his own funds. Haidara purchased metal footlockers in which up to 300 manuscripts could be securely stored. Nearly 2,500 of these lockers were distributed to safe houses across the city. Many were later moved to Dreazen.

In 2007, supported by a Fulbright Grant, Alexandra Huddleston spent a year in Timbuktu photographing the legacy of traditional Islamic scholarship. Photographs from this project have been included in the permanent collection of the Library of Congress and exhibited at solo and group exhibitions around the world. A film has been made about this, called 333 Saints: A Life of Scholarship in Timbuktu which can be viewed through the Library of Congress.

== Language ==
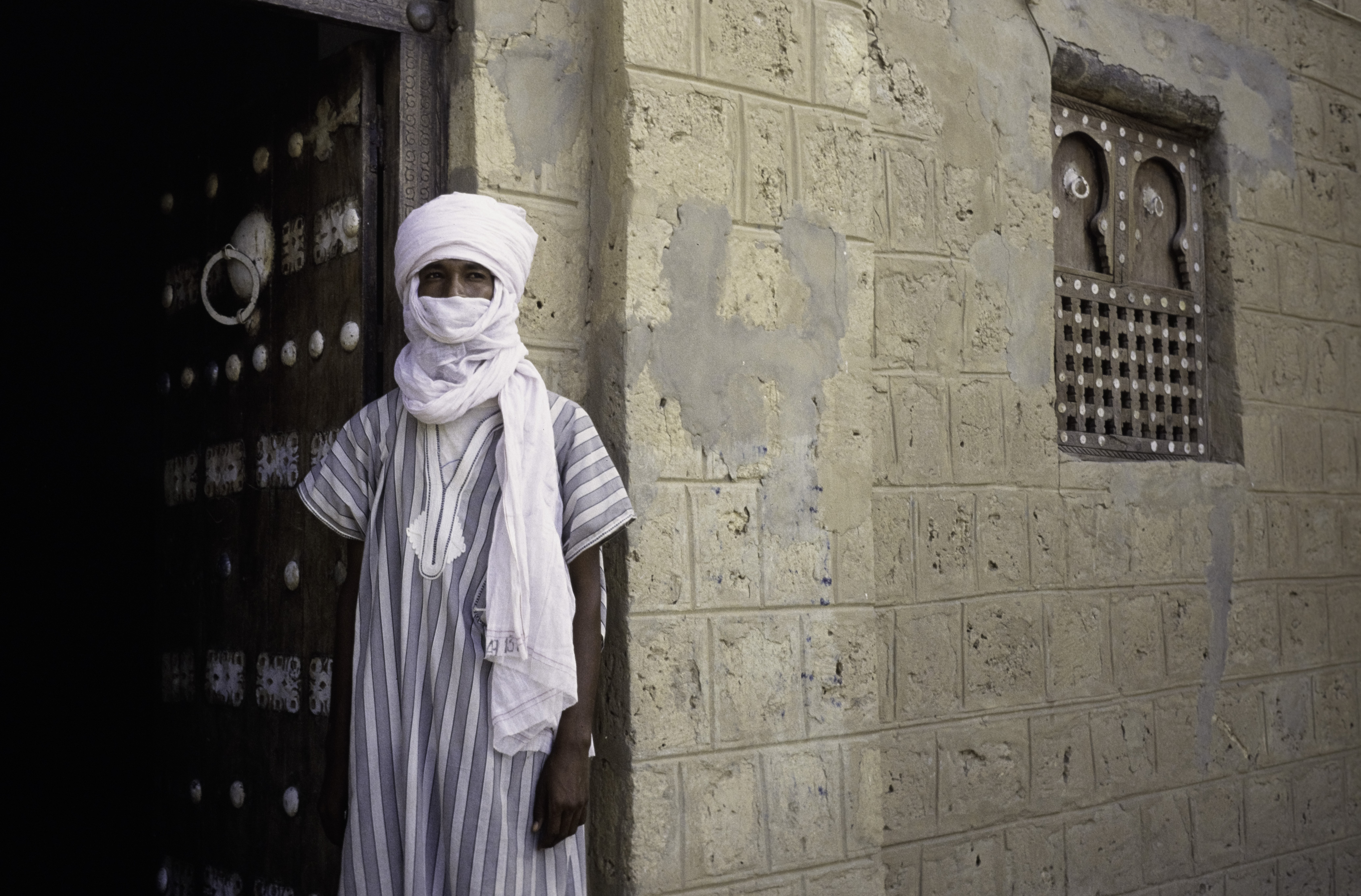
A Tuareg man, wearing traditional attire, in Timbuktu

Although Bambara is the lingua franca of Mali, today the large majority of Timbuktu's inhabitants speaks Koyra Chiini, a Songhay language that also functions as the lingua franca. Before the 1990–1994 Tuareg rebellion, both Hassaniya Arabic and Tamashek were represented by 10% each to an 80% dominance of the Koyra Chiini language. With Tamashek spoken by both Ikelan and ethnic Tuaregs, its use declined with the expulsion of many Tuaregs following the rebellion, increasing the dominance of Koyra Chiini.

Arabic, introduced together with Islam during the 11th century, has mainly been the language of scholars and religion, comparable to Latin in Western Christianity. Although Bambara is spoken by the most numerous ethnic group in Mali, the Bambara people, it is mainly confined to the south of the country. With an improving infrastructure granting Timbuktu access to larger cities in Mali's South, use of Bambara was increasing in the city at least until Azawad independence.

== Infrastructure ==
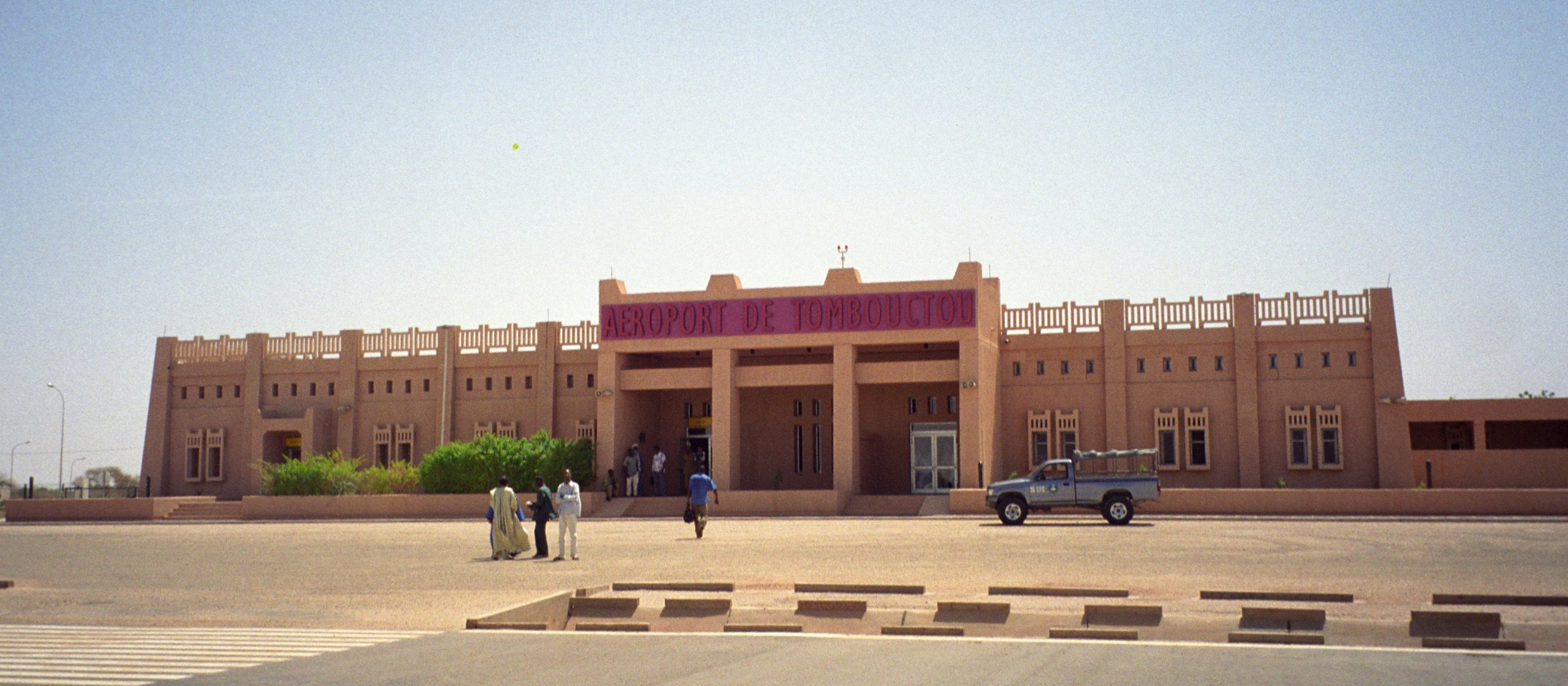
Timbuktu Airport

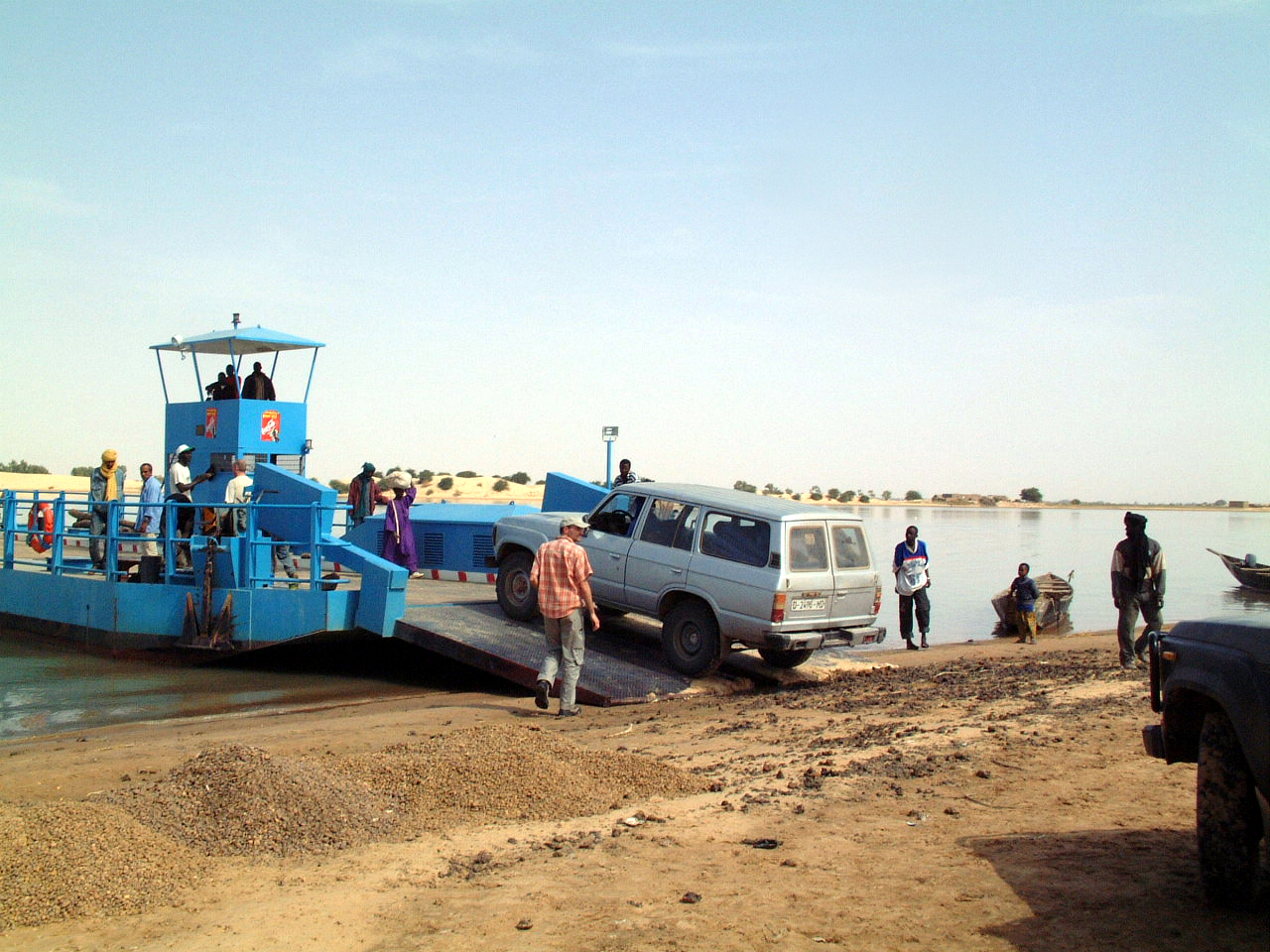
Ferry on the Niger River in Timbuktu

With no railroads in Mali except for the Dakar-Niger Railway up to Koulikoro, access to Timbuktu is by road, boat or, since 1961, aircraft. With high water levels in the Niger from August to December, Compagnie Malienne de Navigation (COMANAV) passenger ferries operate a leg between Koulikoro and downstream Gao on a roughly weekly basis. Also requiring high water are pinasses (large motorized pirogues), either chartered or public, that travel up and down the river.

Both ferries and pinasses arrive at Korioumé, Timbuktu's port, which is linked to the city centre by an 18 km (11 mi) paved road running through Kabara. In 2007, access to Timbuktu's traditional port, Kabara, was restored by a Libyan funded project that dredged the 3 km (2 mi) silted canal connecting Kabara to an arm of the Niger River. COMANAV ferries and pinasses are now able to reach the port when the river is in full flood.

Timbuktu is poorly connected to the Malian road network with only dirt roads to the neighbouring towns. Although the Niger River can be crossed by ferry at Korioumé, the roads south of the river are no better. However, a new paved road is under construction between Niono and Timbuktu running to the north of the Inland Niger Delta. The 565 km (351 mi) road will pass through Nampala, Léré, Niafunké, Tonka, Diré and Goundam. The completed 81 km (50 mi) section between Niono and the small village of Goma Coura was financed by the Millennium Challenge Corporation. This new section will service the Alatona irrigation system development of the Office du Niger. The 484 km (301 mi) section between Goma Coura and Timbuktu is being financed by the European Development Fund.

Timbuktu Airport was served by Air Mali, hosting flights to and from Bamako, Gao and Mopti. until the airline suspended operations in 2014. Its 6,923 ft (2,110 m) runway in a 07/25 runway orientation is both lighted and paved. As of July 2023, Timbuktu Airport is served by Sky Mali to and from Bamako, using Boeing 737 aircraft.

== Notable people ==
- Ali Farka Toure (1939–2006), a musician, known for popularizing the desert blues genre.
- Ahmad Baba al-Timbukti (1556–1627), a Sanhaja Berber writer, scholar and political provocateur.
- Abdul Rahman Ibrahima Sori (1762–1829), a prince and Amir (commander) who was captured and sold to slave traders and transported to the United States in 1788.
- Mahamane Alassane Haidara (1910–1981), a politician who was elected to the French Senate in 1948.
- Souheil Ben-Barka (born 1942), a Moroccan film director, screenwriter and film producer.
- Cissé Mariam Kaïdama Sidibé (1948–2021), a Malian politician, the first female prime minister of Mali.
- Alphadi (born 1957), a notable Nigerien fashion designer, known as the "Magician of the Desert".
- Halima Cissé (born 1996), mother who gave birth to the only nonuplets known to have survived birth

== In popular culture ==
Because much of the gold imported to Europe in the seventeenth and eighteenth centuries came from Timbuktu, the city has long been considered a mysterious, hidden place. This association remains with modern Europeans and North Americans: a 2006 survey of 150 young Britons found that 34% did not believe the town existed, while the other 66% considered it "a mythical place". This perception has been acknowledged in literature describing African history and African-European relations. In popular Western culture, Timbuktu is also often considered an idiomatic stand-in for any faraway place.

The origin of this mystification lies in the excitement brought to Europe by the legendary tales, especially those by Leo Africanus in his Description of Africa. Arabic sources focused mainly on more affluent cities in the Timbuktu region, such as Gao and Walata. In West Africa, the city holds an image that has been compared to Europe's view on Athens. As such, the picture of the city as the epitome of distance and mystery is a European one.

Stories of great riches served as a catalyst for travellers to visit the inaccessible city, with prominent French explorer René Caillié characterising Timbuktu as "a mass of ill-looking houses built of earth". This development shifted the city's reputation, from being fabled because of its gold to fabled because of its location and mystery. Being used in this sense since at least 1863, English dictionaries now cite Timbuktu as a metaphor for any faraway place.

Timbuktu plays a vital role in Dorothy Dunnett's House of Niccolo series of historical novels, as a physical setting in Scales of Gold, and as a spiritual and intellectual influence throughout, through the character of Umar, a man from that city enslaved in Europe under the name Loppe, and his friendship with Nicholas, the central character of the series.

Timbuktu has featured in Disney media several times, serving a similar role. It was featured often in Donald Duck comics, and was often used as a hideout. It is also featured in The Aristocats, in which the butler Edgar plans to send the cats there, but ends up getting sent there himself. It mistakenly lists the location of Timbuktu as in French Equatorial Africa, when Mali was actually part of French West Africa.

The musical Timbuktu! premiered on Broadway on 1 March 1978. With lyrics by George Forrest and Robert Wright, set to music by Borodin, Forrest and Wright and a book by Luther Davis, it is a retelling of Forrest and Wright's musical Kismet, changing the setting to mid-14th century Timbuktu. It starred Eartha Kitt, William Marshall, Gilbert Price, Melba Moore and George Bell. Geoffrey Holder was director, choreographer and costume designer.

== Twin towns – sister cities ==
Timbuktu is twinned with:

- Chemnitz, Germany
- Hay-on-Wye, Wales (United Kingdom)
- Kairouan, Tunisia
- Marrakesh, Morocco
- Saintes, France
- Tempe, United States

== See also ==
- List of cities in Mali
- History of Timbuktu

== Cited and general sources ==
- Barth, Heinrich (1857), Travels and discoveries in North and Central Africa: Being a journal of an expedition undertaken under the auspices of H. B. M.'s government, in the years 1849–1855, New York: Harper & Brothers. Google books: Volume 1, Volume 2, Volume 3. |internet Archive: Volume 3.
- Caillié, Réné (1830), Travels through Central Africa to Timbuctoo; and across the Great Desert, to Morocco, performed in the years 1824–1828, London: Colburn & Bentley. Google books: Volume 1, Volume 2.
- Cleaveland, Timothy (2008), "Timbuktu and Walata: lineages and higher education", in Jeppie, Shamil; Diagne, Souleymane Bachir (eds.), The Meanings of Timbuktu (PDF), Cape Town: HSRC Press, pp. 77–91, ISBN 978-0-7969-2204-5, archived from the original (PDF) on 24 April 2021.
- Dubois, Felix (1896), Timbuctoo the mysterious, Tombouctou la mystérieuse.English.1896, translated by White, Diana, New York: Longmans, hdl:2027/mdp.39015008010343.
- Hammer, Joshua (2016). The Bad-Ass Librarians of Timbuktu And Their Race to Save the World's Most Precious Manuscripts. New York: Simon & Schuster. ISBN 978-1-4767-7743-6.
- Hacquard, Augustin (1900), Monographie de Tombouctou, Paris: Société des études coloniales & maritimes. Also available from Gallica.
- Heath, Jeffrey (1999), A Grammar of Koyra Chiini: the Songhay of Timbuktu, Berlin: Walter de Gruyter, ISBN 9783110162851.
- Hunwick, John O. (2003), Timbuktu and the Songhay Empire: Al-Sadi's Tarikh al-Sudan down to 1613 and other contemporary documents, Leiden: Brill, ISBN 978-90-04-12560-5. ISBN 978-90-04-12822-4 (paperback) First published in 1999 as ISBN 90-04-11207-3.
- Insoll, Timothy (2002), "The Archaeology of Post Medieval Timbuktu" (PDF), Sahara, 13: 7–22, archived from the original (PDF) on 8 March 2012.
- Insoll, Timothy (2004), "Timbuktu the less Mysterious?" ( (PDF)), in Mitchell, P.; Haour, A.; Hobart, J. (eds.), Researching Africa's Past. New Contributions from British Archaeologists, Oxford: Oxbow, pp. 81–88, archived from the original on 8 March 2012.
- Jackson, James Grey (1820), An Account of Timbuctoo and Housa, Territories in the Interior of Africa By El Hage Abd Salam Shabeeny, London: Longman, Hurst, Rees, Orme, and Brown.
- Jeppie, Shamil (2008), "Re/discovering Timbuktu", in Jeppie, Shamil; Diagne, Souleymane Bachir (eds.), The Meanings of Timbuktu (PDF), Cape Town: HSRC Press, pp. 1–17, ISBN 978-0-7969-2204-5, archived from the original (PDF) on 24 April 2021.
- Leo Africanus (1896), The History and Description of Africa (3 Vols), Brown, Robert, editor, London: Hakluyt Society. A facsimile of Pory's English translation of 1600 together with an introduction and notes by the editor. Internet Archive: Volume 1, Volume 2, Volume 3
- Medupe, R.T.; Warner, B.; Jeppie, S.; Sanogo, S.; Maiga, M.; Maiga, A.; Dembele, M.; Diakite, D.; Tembely, L.; Kanoute, M.; Traore, S.; Sodio, B.; Hawkes, S. (2008). "The Timbuktu Astronomy Project". In Holbrook, J.; Medupe, R.T.; Urama, J.O. (eds.). African Cultural Astronomy. Astrophysics and Space Science Proceedings. Springer, Dordrecht. pp. 179–188. doi:10.1007/978-1-4020-6639-9_13. ISBN 978-1-4020-6639-9.
- Miner, Horace (1953), The Primitive City of Timbuctoo, Princeton University Press. Link requires subscription to Aluka. Reissued by Anchor Books, New York in 1965.
- Park, Douglas (2010), "Timbuktu and its prehistoric hinterland", Antiquity, 84 (326): 1076–1088, doi:10.1017/S0003598X00067090, S2CID 161730981.
- Park, Douglas (2011). Climate Change, Human Response and the Origins of Urbanism at Prehistoric Timbuktu (PhD). New Haven: Yale University, Department of Anthropology..
- Saad, Elias N. (1983), Social History of Timbuktu: The Role of Muslim Scholars and Notables 1400–1900, Cambridge University Press, ISBN 978-0-521-24603-3.
