= Arham =

- Commune and village
- Location in Mali
- Coordinates: 16°22′45″N 3°22′28″W
- Country: Mali
- Region: Tombouctou Region
- Cercle: Diré Cercle

Area
  - Total: 97 km^{2} (37 sq mi)

Population (2009 census)
  - Total: 3,147
  - Density: 32/km^{2} (84/sq mi)
- Time zone: UTC+0 (GMT)
- Climate: BWh

Arham is a village and commune of the Cercle of Diré in the Tombouctou Region of Mali.
