= Haibongo =

- Commune and village
- Location in Mali
- Coordinates: 16°13′23″N 3°14′42″W
- Country: Mali
- Region: Tombouctou Region
- Cercle: Diré Cercle

Area
  - Total: 240 km^{2} (93 sq mi)

Population (2009 census)
  - Total: 14,247
  - Density: 59/km^{2} (150/sq mi)
- Time zone: UTC+0 (GMT)
- Climate: BWh

Haibongo is a village and rural commune of the Cercle of Diré in the Tombouctou Region of Mali.
