= Houssa =

Semi-mythical place

Houssa or Housa (Arabic: هوسا), was the name given in western culture to a purportedly huge and magical city in the interior of Africa, on the banks of the Niger River. Houssa is identified as Gao in some sources.

Ezekiel Blomfield described the city thus:

"Another celebrated city in the interior of Africa is Houssa, the capital of an African empire on the banks of the Niger, a city which has excited much curiosity among men of science since it was first mentioned to a committee of the African Association, about the year 1790. The person from whom they received their information was an Arab, of the name Shabeni; who said that the population of Houssa, where he had resided two years, was equalled only (so far as his knowledge extended) by that of London and Cairo; and, in his rude unlettered way, he described the government as monarchial, yet not unlimited; its justice as severe, but directed by written laws; and the rights of landed property as guarded by the institutions of certain hereditary officers, whose functions appear to be similar to those of the Canongoes of Hindostan, and whose important complicated duties imply an unusual degree of civilization and refinement. For the probity of the merchants of Houssa the Arab expressed the highest respect; but remarked, with indignation, that the women were admitted to society, and that the honour of the husband was often insecure. Of their written alphabet he knew no more than that it is perfectly different from the Arabic and the Hebrew characters; but he represented the art of writing as common in Houssa. And when he described the manner in which their pottery was made, he gave, unknowingly to himself, a representation of the ancient Grecian wheel."

When Mungo Park returned from Africa to London in 1797, The Times inaccurately announced that he had found Houssa.

Major Houghton's account of Houssa illustrates some of the confusion around the name Houssa.

"Mr Magra's Information, obtained from merchants who had visited the central parts of Africa, and were then at Tunis, describes Houssa as a country, not a city; and they all place it in a south direction from Tunis: that is between Cashnah and Tombuctoo. One person says it is a considerable empire: the country of the Negroes. Another, that it is the negro name of the same country, which the Arabs call Soudan. Shabeni says, that Houssa is included in Sudan: but as I conceive Soudan to be a region, which includes several political divisions of country, and Cashnah among the rest; this proves nothing as to the particular position of Houssa. But it is clear by these accounts that there is such a country as Houssa: and equally so, from Mamadoo's, and from Shabeni's reports that there is a city of the same name, likewise."

== See also ==
- European exploration of Africa
- Triangular trade
- Trans-Saharan trade
