= Sidi Mahmoud Ben Amar =

- Born: 1463
- Died: 1548 (aged 84–85)
- Known for: One of the 333 Sufi saints said to be buried in Timbuktu

Academic work
- Discipline: Islam

Sidi Mahmoud Ben Amar (also known as Sidi Amar, Cadi Sidi Mahmoud, or Sidi Mahmoud) was a revered Muslim scholar who is one of the 333 Sufi saints said to be buried in Timbuktu. The tomb of Sidi Mahmoud Ben Amar is among 16 cemeteries and mausolea that are a part of Timbuktu, which is classified as a UNESCO World Heritage Site. On 30 June 2012, it was reported that his tomb had been destroyed by Ansar Dine following the Battle of Gao, as it contravened sharia according to Ansar Dine. These attacks resemble those carried out by the Wahabist movement on the Arabian peninsula during the late 18th century.

== Notability as pilgrimage site ==
According to tradition the Cadi Sidi Mahmoud belonged to a Berber tribe of the Godala. His forebears moved to Timbuktu after living in Macina and then Oualata. He was born in 1463 or 1464 and was named Cadi in 1498 or 99 and he died in 1548. Sidi Mahmoud was Ahmed Baba's great uncle. The Tarikh (histories) of Timbuktu attributed him with numerous legends. His tomb is a place of pilgrimage and his descendants count many scholars. The tomb of Sidi Mahmoud Ben Amar is visited by local people who believe he has the power to bring rain, through the blessing of God.

== Part of a UNESCO World Heritage Site ==
The UNESCO website specifically calls out the tomb of Sidi Mahmoud Ben Amar as follows: "Equally noteworthy and from the same general period [is] the grave of the scholar Sidi Mahmoudou, who died in year 955 of the Hegira (1547 CE)." In 2012, it was listed as "endangered" along with the other sites in Timbuktu.

== Attacks by Islamist rebels ==
During the Tuareg rebellion of 2012, Islamist fighters attacked and desecrated the tomb of Sidi Mahmoud Ben Amar. In April 2012, Ansar Dine fighters had taken over Timbuktu and reportedly were trying to impose Sharia law. UNESCO had expressed concern about the safety of this and other sites in the city. On 30 June, it was reported by a local journalist that Ansar Dine had completely destroyed the mausoleum, along with two others, and would eventually destroy 13 other cemeteries and mausolea.

== See also ==
- Bourem Sidi Amar
- Buddhas of Bamiyan, Buddha statues in Afghanistan that were destroyed by the Taliban as being in violation of sharia
