= Kondi =

Coordinates: 16°22′N 3°29′W

- Commune and village
- Interactive map of Kondi
- Country: Mali
- Region: Tombouctou Region
- Cercle: Diré Cercle

Population (1998)
  - Total: 3,269
- Time zone: UTC+0 (GMT)
- Climate: BWh

Kondi is a village and commune of the Cercle of Diré in the Tombouctou Region of Mali. As of 1998 the commune had a population of 3,269.
