= Tienkour =

- Commune and village
- Location in Mali
- Coordinates: 16°15′19″N 3°19′29″W
- Country: Mali
- Region: Tombouctou Region
- Cercle: Diré Cercle

Area
  - Total: 187 km^{2} (72 sq mi)

Population (2009 census)
  - Total: 6,110
  - Density: 32.7/km^{2} (84.6/sq mi)
- Time zone: UTC+0 (GMT)
- Climate: BWh

Tienkour is a village and rural commune of the Cercle of Diré in the Tombouctou Region of Mali.
