= Sareyamou =

- Commune and village
- Location in Mali
- Coordinates: 16°05′23″N 3°14′07″W
- Country: Mali
- Region: Tombouctou Region
- Cercle: Diré Cercle

Area
  - Total: 534 km^{2} (206 sq mi)

Population (2009 census)
  - Total: 19,357
  - Density: 36.2/km^{2} (93.9/sq mi)
- Time zone: UTC+0 (GMT)
  - Summer (DST): UTC-3°14’07’’ 16°05’23’’
- Climate: BWh

Sareyamou is a village and commune of the Cercle of Diré in the Tombouctou Region of Mali. The commune contains 11 settlements.
