= Tinguereguif =

- Commune
- Location in Mali
- Coordinates: 16°23′59″N 3°17′59″W
- Country: Mali
- Region: Tombouctou Region
- Cercle: Diré Cercle
- Admin HQ (chef-lieu): Gari

Area
  - Total: 140 km^{2} (54 sq mi)

Population (2009 census)
  - Total: 4,775
  - Density: 34/km^{2} (88/sq mi)
- Time zone: UTC+0 (GMT)

Tinguereguif is a rural commune of the Cercle of Diré in the Tombouctou Region of Mali. The administrative center (chef-lieu) is the village of Gari.
