= Kirchamba =

Coordinates: 16°21′N 3°15′W

- Commune and village
- Interactive map of Kirchamba
- Country: Mali
- Region: Tombouctou Region
- Cercle: Diré Cercle

Population (1998)
  - Total: 2,305
- Time zone: UTC+0 (GMT)
- Climate: BWh

Kirchamba is a village and commune of the Cercle of Diré in the Tombouctou Region of Mali. As of 1998 the commune had a population of 2,305.

== History ==
Kirchamba was founded by the Kehath (Ka'ti) family, Spanish Sephardi Jews who were descended from Ismael Jan Kot Al-yahudi of Scheida in Southern Morocco. The Kehath (Ka'ti) family settled in the Songhai Empire in 1492. The Kehath family later converted to Islam along with the rest of the local non-Muslim population.

== See also ==
- Jews of Bilad el-Sudan
