= Second Battle of Timbuktu =

2013 battle of the Mali War

Coordinates: 16.7667°N 3.0000°W

- Part of Mali War
Date	30 March 2013 – 1 April 2013
Location	Timbuktu, Mali
Result	Malian/French victory

Belligerents
Mali; France	AQIM

Commanders and leaders
(Mali) Col. Mamadou Mangara	Unknown

Strength
Unknown	Unknown

Casualties and losses
(Mali) 2 killed, 10 wounded (France) 1 wounded	19 killed
- 6 civilians killed (1 Nigerian)

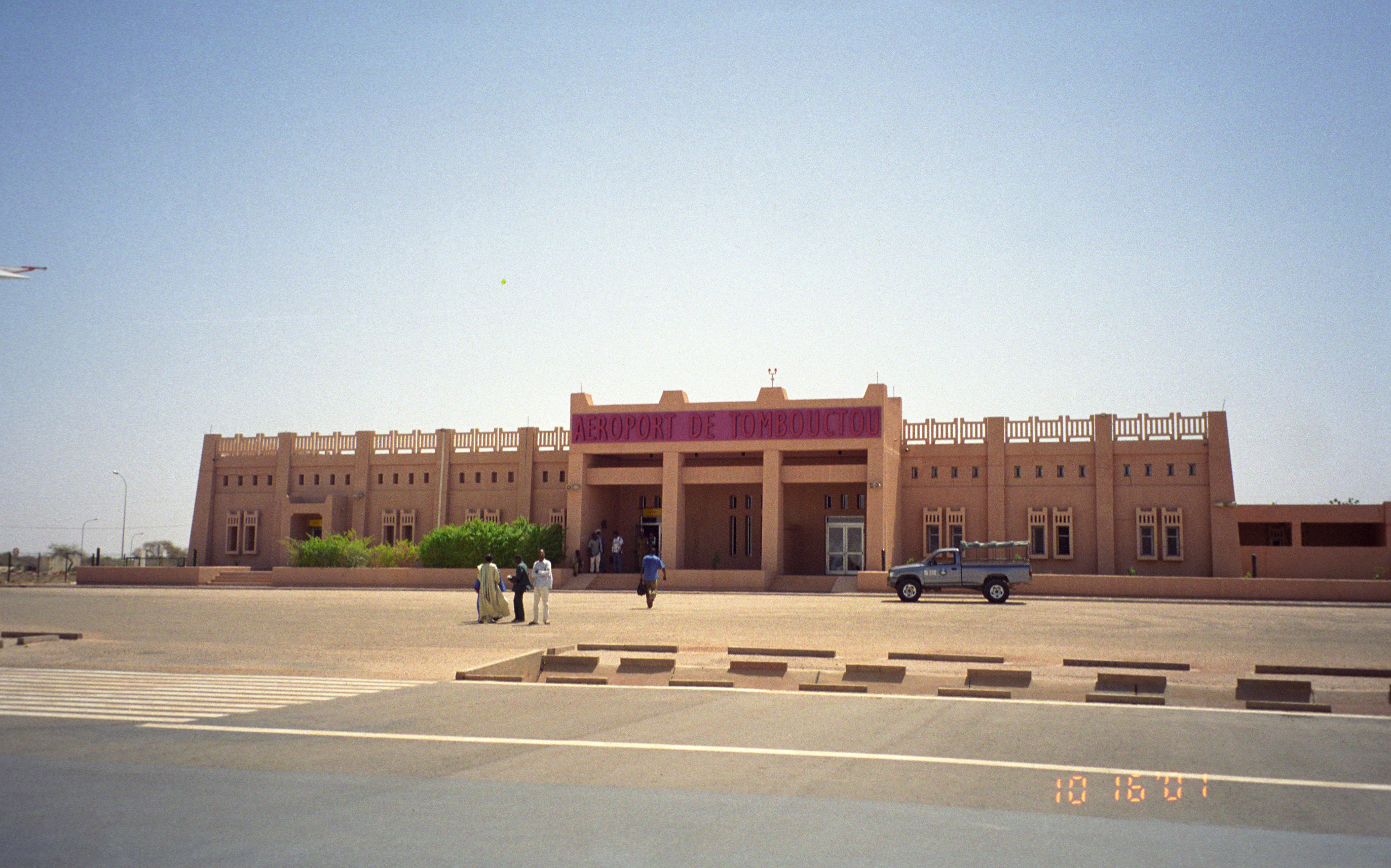
Timbuktu Airport

The Second Battle of Timbuktu was a battle during the Mali War between March 30 and April 1, 2013, in which two Islamist attacks targeted the Malian army in Timbuktu. With help from the French, both attacks were prevented from capturing any significant sites in the city.

== Background ==
On the night of March 20, French and Malian forces repelled two groups of Islamist militants - one attempting to infiltrate Timbuktu regional airport and the other attempting to forcibly enter the city by car.

A few hours after the fighting began, a suicide bomber approached the airport in a camouflaged military vehicle and detonated a car bomb, killing a soldier and injuring two others. After the explosion, Malian and French troops were put on high alert and opened fire on a Malian army vehicle they believed to be suspicious, injuring three of its passengers. During the clashes, two Mirage 2000D planes intervened to support the troops on the ground. Fighting intensified after 4am, but ended three hours later in the airport area. According to the French army, there were approximately 50 attackers.

French forces expected a second attack on the city following the jihadist's failed first incursion. The French 1st Marine Infantry Regiment received reinforcements from the 92nd Infantry Regiment and the 126th Infantry Regiment. Colonel Mamadou Mangara was still in control of the city, and French forces were based at the airport.

== Battle ==
On the 30th of March, according to a spokesman for the army, fighters from Al-Qaeda in the Islamic Maghreb (AQIM) attacked the city late on Saturday night and continued fighting until Sunday. The attack started at about 10 pm local time, when a jihadist suicide bomber blew himself up at a military checkpoint at the western entrance to Timbuktu. "The jihadist was on foot and died on the spot, but his explosives slightly injured one of our soldiers," said Capt. Samba Coulibaly, a spokesman for the Malian military in Timbuktu. According to Mali army Captain Modibo Naman Traore, the suicide bombing served only to distract the military and allow a group of jihadists to infiltrate by night. A Malian soldier taking part in the fighting said, "The jihadists are a few. They sneaked into the military camp and the city of Timbuktu. There is shooting at the moment, but we'll get to the end." Timbuktu residents said as of that Sunday afternoon shooting could still be heard in the city. On Sunday morning, the Malian army launched operations to track down the infiltrated jihadists. By the mid-afternoon, heavy street-fighting left a Malian soldier and two jihadists dead.

A French unit of around 50 soldiers were dispatched to reinforce the Malian army in Timbuktu, and got further back-up from French fighter jets. Residents claimed the suicide bomber blew himself up on one of the only paved roads at the heart of Timbuktu close to Hotel la Colombe, the town's main hotel used by both journalists and aid workers. A Malian officer reported to AFP that fighting began when the Islamist rebels opened fire on two sides of the center of the city, targeting the hotel serving as the temporary residence for the regions governor as well as a Malian army base. The hotel had been hosting a large government delegation at the time. The guests were then immediately evacuated to a nearby French army base. According to a hotel employee jihadists fighters had taken over the back of the hotel complex, near the swimming pool. Another group of fighters took cover inside the local high school. Timbuktu's mayor Ousmane Halle also confirmed that radical Islamists moved to the high school, near the army camp in the city. By then another Malian soldier was confirmed dead. A Malian officer then reported that fighting itself was taking place outside the camp, when a group of soldiers conducting late night searches discovered that a group of jihadists had infiltrated into a nearby building. Two suicide bombers then blew themselves with explosive belts without inflicting any casualties on the army. The bodies of four other jihadists were discovered behind the military camp. A Nigerian civilian was also killed when a jihadist suicide bomber took him hostage in the northern part of the city. During a shoot-out between Malian troops and his captor, both the jihadist and Nigerian were killed. By late Sunday, relative calm had been restored to several parts of the city.

On Monday morning, Malian troops searched house-to-house to ensure that there were no more remaining fighters infiltrated as civilians. Meanwhile, residents say five civilians were killed in cross-fire during the fighting. At least three jihadists were claimed to have been killed according to a Malian military source during a sweep by French and Malian soldiers. The statement said: "During our clean-up operation, the Mali and French armies destroyed a public building in the centre of the town where the terrorists were hiding. We have found the bodies of three terrorists". The incident began when a group of two to three militants managed to enter a small house located on the side of the army camp. A Malian soldier was killed when he went in, thinking the jihadists had already fled the city. It is believed after that a French aircraft then bombarded that house, killing the occupants in the air raid.

A spokesman for the Malian army in Timbuktu said there were still rebel movements behind the military camp in the town center and in the alleyways by the 14th century Djinguereber Mosque, a UNESCO World Heritage Site. By Monday afternoon, according to the French ministry of defense, jihadists fled Timbuktu to the northeast direction after Mirage and Rafale jets flew over the city to hunt down the fighters. According to French authorities, three Malian soldiers were killed in the fighting and a dozen more were wounded.
