= Bourem Sidi Amar =

- Commune and village
- Location in Mali
- Coordinates: 16°22′01″N 3°19′59″W
- Country: Mali
- Region: Tombouctou Region
- Cercle: Diré Cercle

Area
  - Total: 99 km^{2} (38 sq mi)

Population (2009 census)
  - Total: 10,488
  - Density: 110/km^{2} (270/sq mi)
- Time zone: UTC+0 (GMT)
- Climate: BWh

Bourem Sidi Amar is a village and commune of the Cercle of Diré in the Tombouctou Region of Mali.
