= Diré =

- Commune and town
- Location in Mali
- Coordinates: 16°15′22″N 3°24′36″W
- Country: Mali
- Region: Tombouctou Region
- Cercle: Diré Cercle

Population (2009 census)
  - Total: 22,365
- Time zone: UTC+0 (GMT)
- Climate: BWh

Niger River at Diré
- Average monthly flow (m^{3}/s) at the Diré hydrometric station over the period 1924-1992

Diré is a town and commune on the left bank of the Niger River in the Tombouctou Region of Mali. In the 2009 census the population of the commune was 22,365. The town is the administrative center of the Diré Cercle. There are several languages spoken, but the main language is Songhay. The population is predominantly Muslim. Situated on the Niger River, the principal industries are agriculture and commerce.
