= Diré Cercle =

Coordinates: 16.256°N 3.410°W

- Cercle
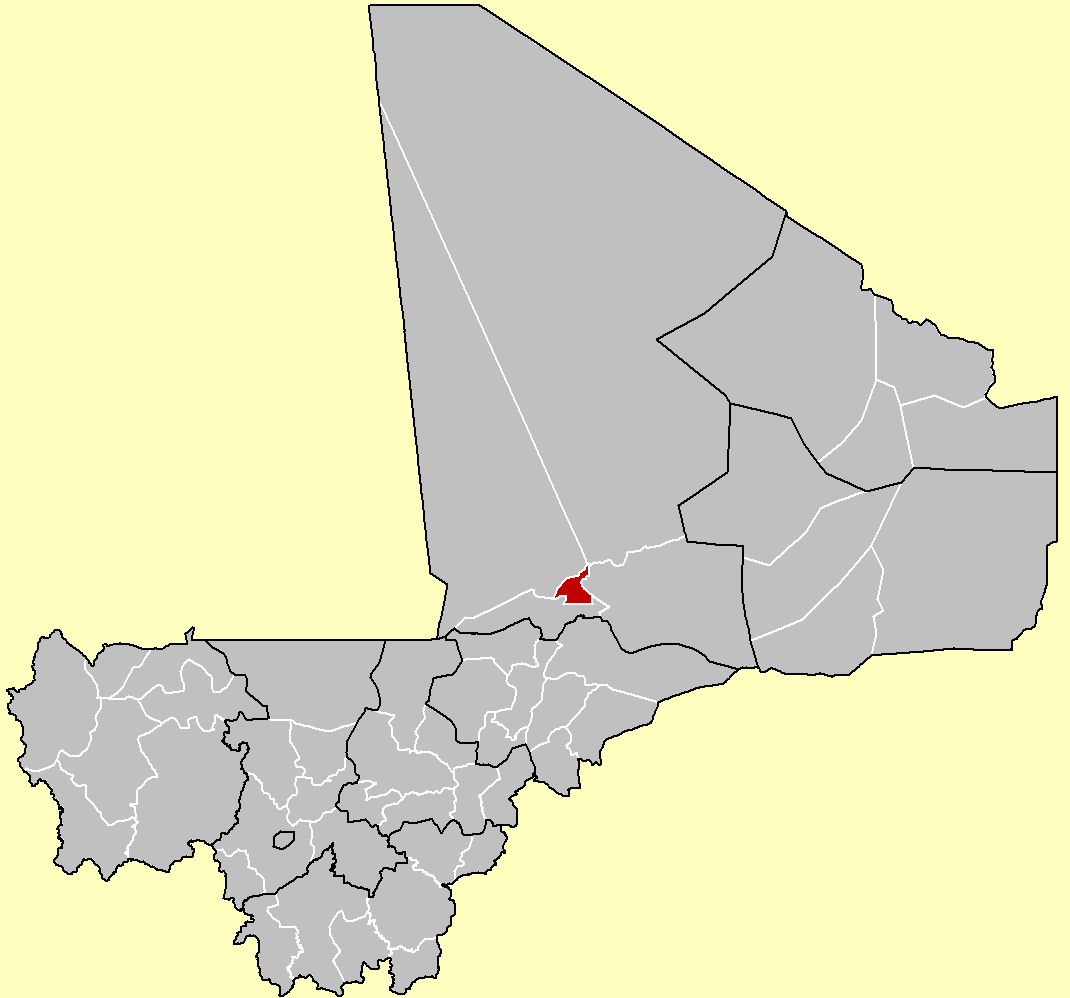
- Location of the Cercle of Diré in Mali
- Country: Mali
- Region: Tombouctou Region
- Capital: Diré

Area
  - Total: 1,750 km^{2} (680 sq mi)

Population (2009)
  - Total: 111,324
  - Density: 63.6/km^{2} (165/sq mi)
- Time zone: UTC+0 (GMT)

Diré Cercle is an administrative subdivision of the Tombouctou Region of Mali. The administrative center (chef-lieu) is the town of Diré.

The cercle is divided into 13 communes:

- Arham
- Binga
- Bourem Sidi Amar
- Dangha
- Diré
- Garbakoïra
- Haïbongo
- Kirchamba
- Kondi
- Sareyamou
- Tienkour
- Tindirma
- Tinguereguif
