= Mohamed Ag Intalla =

Malian politician (born 1950)

Secretary-general of the High Council for the Unity of Azawad
- In office May 6, 2013 – July 2014
- Preceded by: Position established
- Succeeded by: Alghabass Ag Intalla

Amenokal of Ifoghas Tuaregs
- Incumbent
- Assumed office December 20, 2014
- Preceded by: Intalla Ag Attaher

Deputy for Tin-Essako Cercle
- Incumbent
- Assumed office 2013

Personal details
- Born: 1950 (age 75–76) Kidal Region, Mali
- Relations: Intalla Ag Attaher (father); Alghabass Ag Intalla (brother); Attayoub Ag Intalla (brother)

Mohamed Ag Intalla is a Malian Tuareg politician who has served as the amenukal of the Ifoghas Tuaregs since December 20, 2014.

== Biography ==
Intalla was born in 1950 as the eldest son of amenokal Intalla Ag Attaher. Intalla has two younger brothers; Attayoub and Alghabass. During his childhood, Intalla attended a French school and then a quranic school. He was sent on a peace delegation to Niger during the Tuareg rebellion of 2007 to 2009. When the Mali War broke out in 2012, Intalla did not join one of the Tuareg rebel movements. His father, however, supported the National Movement for the Liberation of Azawad (MNLA) and his brother Alghabass joined Ansar Dine.

On May 2, 2013, Intalla founded the High Council of Azawad (HCA), the predecessor to the High Council for the Unity of Azawad (HCUA). He called on members of the MNLA and Islamic Movement of Azawad (MIA), the latter being founded by Alghabass, to join the HCA to bolster peace in northern Mali. Intalla declared that the HCA was a "peaceful movement not demanding independence from northern Mali and against terrorism."

His father Attaher joined the HCA first, and Alghabass followed soon after and dissolved the MIA. On May 19, 2013, Attaher was appointed president of the HCUA and Intalla was appointed secretary-general. Intalla ran in the 2013 Malian parliamentary election under Rally for Mali, and was elected as deputy of Tin-Essako Cercle with 100% of the votes, although 86% of the population abstained from voting.

Intalla was appointed amenokal of the Ifoghas Tuaregs on December 20, 2014, two days after his father Attaher's death in Kidal. Attaher's dying wish was for Intalla to be his successor. In 2015, Intalla told RFI that he was against the independence of Azawad, and in 2016, called for negotiations with jihadists to cut the jihadist groups off from foreign contacts.

Intalla was re-elected as deputy of Tin-Essako in 2020, but this was cut short due to the 2020 Malian coup d'état. However, he was appointed to the National Transitional Council under the same role. Following the resurgence in conflict between the Coordination of Azawad Movements and Malian junta under Assimi Goïta in 2023, Intalla called for restraint and a return to the Algiers Accords of 2015. Intalla supported the merger of the HCUA, MNLA, and Arab Movement of Azawad into the CSP-PSD in February 2023. He resigned from the National Transitional Council in October 2023.
