= Mali War =

Ongoing conflict in West Africa since 2012

- Part of the War in the Sahel, war on terror and the War against the Islamic State
- Military situation in Mali and neighboring countries as of 6 October 2026. For a detailed map, see here.
| Date | 16 January 2012 – present (14 years, 10 months and 4 days) |
| Location | Mali (with spillover into Algeria, Burkina Faso, Niger, Benin and Togo) |
| Status | Ongoing |

Belligerents
| 2012–2013 Mali 2013–2023: Mali; France; MINUSMA (Note: MINUSMA, the United Nations Multidimensional Integrated Stabilization Mission in Mali, replaced and absorbed the troops from the AFISMA. It included troops from Chad, Bangladesh, Senegal, Togo, Egypt, Burkina Faso, Niger, Ivory Coast, Guinea, Germany, China, Benin, among others); Chad (2013 only); Wagner Group (from 2021); 2023–: Mali; Russia (2022–present); Africa Corps; Wagner Group (until 2025); AES; Native militia 2014–: Platform; MPSA; Ganda Iso; MAA Loyalists; MSA (2019–); GATIA (2019–23); 2015–2023: CSP (from 2021); CMA; Platform (from 2021) | 2012: MNLA; Al-Qaeda; AQIM; Ansaru; Ansar Dine; MOJWA; Boko Haram; 2012–2015: CMA (from 2014); MNLA; HCUA (from 2013); 2023–2024: CSP; CMA; GATIA (al-Mahmoud faction); 2024–: FLA; Ukraine (intelligence support and training); JNIM (since 2026); 2012–: CMI (2017–); Other armed groups and self-defense militias | 2012–2017: Al-Qaeda; AQIM; Al-Mourabitoun (from 2015); Ansaru (until 2013); Ansar Dine; Katiba Macina (from 2016); Ansarul Islam (from 2016); MOJWA (until 2013); Boko Haram (until 2013); 2017–: Al-Qaeda; JNIM; 2015–: IS; ISSP |

Commanders and leaders
| (Mali) Assimi Goita (2021–) (Mali) Abdoulaye Maiga; Sadio Camara X (Russia) Vladimir Putin (Russia) Andrey Averyanov Former: (Mali) Amadou Toumani Touré; (Mali) Amadou Sanogo; (Mali) Dioncounda Traoré; (Mali) Ibrahim Boubacar Keïta; (Mali) Bah Ndaw; (Mali) Abdoulaye Idrissa Maïga; (Mali) Soumeylou Boubèye Maïga; (France) Emmanuel Macron; (France) François Hollande; (France) Élisabeth Borne; (France) Jean Castex; (France) Édouard Philippe; (France) Bernard Cazeneuve; (France) Manuel Valls; (France) Jean-Marc Ayrault; (Russia) Yunus-bek Yevkurov; Yevgeny Prigozhin X; Pavel Prigozhin; MINUSMA: (United Nations) Michael Lollesgaard; (United Nations) Jean-Paul Deconinck; (United Nations) Dennis Gyllensporre; (United Nations) Johannes Matthijssen; (European Union) Marc Rudkiewicz; Bilal Ag Acherif (CSP) | Alghabass Ag Intalla; (Azawad) Bilal Ag Acherif (WIA); Fahad Ag Almahmoud †; Mohamed Ag Najem | Iyad Ag Ghali; Mokhtar Belmokhtar †; Abdelhamid Abou Zeid †; Abdelmalek Droukdel †; Abubakar Shekau †; Abu al-Bara' al-Sahrawi; Adnan Abu Walid al-Sahrawi †; Abu Huzeifa † |

Strength
| Pre-war; (Mali) 12,150 (Note: Number includes paramilitary forces if they support or replace regular military forces. Data from 2020 from the International Institute for Strategic Studies); Most recent; (Mali) 41,000; (France) 3,000; 10,116 (Note: There were an additional 1,575 police. Numbers from July 2023); (European Union) 550 (Note: In 2013); ~500 (FLNA) | 2012 (Azawad) 2,800–4,000 | 2013: 3,000; (Boko Haram) 100; 2026: ~10,000 |

Casualties and losses
| 2012 (Mali) 1,000+ casualties 2013–2020: (Mali) at least 1800; (France) 58 killed; (Russia) 127–300 killed; 2013–2023: 311 killed; (European Union) 2 killed | (Azawad) Unknown | 2013–2022 2,800+ killed |
- Total killed: 20,000 (Note: Civilian and combatant deaths from armed conflict from 2012–2026. Data from Our World in Data); Displaced: ~144,000 refugees abroad ~230,000 internally displaced persons Total: ≈374,000

The Mali War (Note: Arabic: حرب مالي; Bambara: Mali Kɛlɛ; French: Guerre du Mali) is an ongoing conflict that began on 16 January 2012 with a Tuareg rebellion in northern Mali. The rebels included the secular-oriented National Movement for the Liberation of Azawad (MNLA), a group fighting for independence or greater autonomy of a region they called Azawad. The MNLA was initially allied with the jihadist Ansar Dine, which, in turn, was allied to other Salafi jihadist organizations such as al-Qaeda in the Islamic Maghreb (AQIM) and its splinter, Movement for Oneness and Jihad in West Africa (MOJWA).

On 22 March 2012, President Amadou Toumani Touré was ousted in a coup d'état over his handling of the crisis, a month before a presidential election was to have taken place. Mutinous soldiers, calling themselves the National Committee for the Restoration of Democracy and State, took control and suspended the constitution of Mali. During the uncertainty that followed, resistance put up by government forces in the north began to melt away, enabling the rebels to capture the three provincial capitals of Timbuktu, Kidal, and Gao in three days. On 6 April 2012, stating that it had secured all of its desired territory, the MNLA declared independence from Mali, which was rejected as invalid by the African Union and the European Union.

The MNLA and the jihadist groups soon found themselves at odds, unable to reconcile their conflicting visions for Azawad. Efforts to find common ground failed, and open conflict broke out between them, resulting in a decisive defeat for the MNLA. The jihadists seized control of nearly all of Azawad, with only a few towns and isolated pockets remaining under MNLA and allied militia control.

The government of Mali asked for foreign military help to re-take the north. On 11 January 2013, the French military began operations against the Islamists. By the time of the 2013 presidential election, with the help of French, African, and international military support, government forces had regained most of the territory previously controlled by Islamists and Tuareg nationalists.

A peace deal between the government and Tuareg rebels was signed on 18 June 2013, however on 26 September 2013 the rebels pulled out of the peace agreement and claimed that the government had not respected its commitments to the truce. In mid-2014, the French military in Mali ended its Operation Serval and transitioned to the broader regional counterterrorist effort, Operation Barkhane. In June 2015, negotiations between the government, the pro-government Platform coalition, and the rebel Coordination of Azawad Movements (CMA) culminated in the Algiers Accords, which aimed to decentralize the Malian state, integrate former rebels into the national army, and promote economic development in the north. Despite this, fighting between the two coalitions and various splinter groups continued periodically.

In 2017, Ansar Dine, the Sahara branch of AQIM, Katiba Macina, and the rest of Al-Mourabitoun merged to form the Jama'at Nasr al-Islam wal-Muslimin (JNIM) coalition, pledging allegiance to Ayman al-Zawahiri, then-leader of al-Qaeda. From the founding of the Islamic State – Sahel Province in 2015, the proxy groups of the Islamic State and al-Qaeda in the country, in what researchers called the "Sahel exception" or "Sahel anomaly", peacefully co-existed in their fights against the Malian government and her allies.

By the first half of 2018, rebel attacks had intensified significantly, and by July of that year, northern Mali had largely slipped from government control. Jihadist activity was no longer confined to the north; it expanded rapidly into central Mali. By 2020, some estimates suggested that only one-third of the country remained under government authority. The "jihadist idyll" ended in 2019 when open conflict broke out between JNIM and the ISSP.

Following mass protests, elements of the Malian armed forces, led by Special Forces Col. Assimi Goita, began a mutiny, and subsequently undertook a coup d'état against Keita in 2020. Bah Ndaw was appointed interim president, although it was presumed he would serve as a figurehead, as Goita, being in the military, would have been controversial in the eyes of Western governments. A second coup by Goita followed in 2021 due to differences between them and their respective camps over whether to cooperate with France or Russia.

By the end of the year, hundreds of Wagner Group mercenaries, who would go on to commit several civilian massacres, began deploying across Mali. Their presence prompted strong objections from international forces, despite widespread anti-French sentiment among the Malian population. In February 2022, Canada, France, and its European partners announced a full troop withdrawal within six months, citing Wagner's presence.

In 2023, the withdrawal of MINUSMA and the handover of its 12 military bases at the junta's request heightened tensions between the government and the Strategic Framework for the Defense of the People of Azawad (CSP), a coalition of the CMA and Platform. Disputes arose particularly over bases in Ber and the Kidal region, which they argued, under the accords, they were entitled to, even if small army units may be located there. They would not allow the army to take over the bases without prior negotiations. Later, after previously accusing the junta and Wagner of multiple ceasefire and human rights violations, the CMA declared war on the government, prompting most Platform groups to leave the CSP. On 30 November 2024, the members of the CSP dissolved themselves and merged into the Azawad Liberation Front (FLA), officially returning to demands for the independence of Azawad. On 25 April 2026, the FLA launched an offensive against the junta alongside JNIM, recapturing Kidal and parts of Gao. The FLA and JNIM each issued statements confirming their mutual cooperation for the first time since the war began. Mali recaptured Kidal with the help of Russian forces in October 2026.

== Background ==
Since Mali's independence in 1960, pressures from government policies aimed at crushing traditional power structures, social mores, and local justice customs have caused several rebellions by the Tuaregs. Repeated promises of autonomy made in the aftermath of these uprisings were ignored, and Tuareg leaders were frequently sidelined from national politics. Since Mali gained its independence, the national idea of the Malian state has been built upon the culture of Mandinka's and Bambara's people, who made up the majority of southern part of the country. This has resulted in the exclusion of the culture of the ethnic groups that inhabit northern Mali.

By late 2010, Tuareg political activists were renewing calls for Azawadi independence, asserting that they were marginalized and consequently impoverished in both Mali and Niger, and that mining projects had damaged important pastoral areas. Contributing to these grievances were broader issues such as climate change and a long history of forced modernization imposed on the nomadic societies of northern Mali, which deepened the divide between Tuareg communities and the central government.

During the 2000s, Salafi jihadists and preachers associated with al-Qaeda in the Islamic Maghreb (AQIM) began infiltrating northern Mali from southern Algeria. Seeking refuge from Algerian security forces, they established the region as a strategic rear base, a hub for illicit trade, and a training ground. They radicalized local youth, leading them to attempt to seek a better future through joining the ranks of Al-Qahda. Meanwhile, Southern Algeria AQIM leaders cultivated relationships with tribal and community leaders in northern Mali. By 2012, AQIM had entrenched itself in the region's political, social, and economic networks. Internal disagreements over the Algerian-centric focus of the group led to a split in 2011. The breakaway faction, the Movement for Oneness and Jihad in West Africa (MOJWA), aimed to expand operations across the Sahel and West Africa.

From February 2011, with the collapse of Gaddafi's Libya, hundreds of his Tuareg fighters, many veterans of the previous rebellions and now unemployed, returned to Mali with large stockpiles of weapons. Rebels in the National Transitional Council also returned, driven by financial reasons and the alleged racism of the NTC's fighters and militias. Upon returning, they found that, despite past promises, little had changed in the relationship between their communities and the central government.

In October 2011, the returning fighters began negotiations in Zakak with local leaders in the region, resulting in the formation of the secular-oriented National Movement for the Liberation of Azawad (MNLA), composed of these veterans and several other groups. Although dominated by Tuaregs, the MNLA claimed to represent other ethnic communities as well, and was reportedly joined by some Arab leaders. Bilal Ag Acherif, leader of the MNLA, declared that the responsibility was on Mali to grant the Saharan peoples their right to self-determination, otherwise they would take it themselves. Estimates of returning fighters ranged from 800 to 4,000, later bolstered by as many as 1,500 Tuaregs who deserted the Malian army and up to 500 young recruits from within the region.

1990s vet Iyad Ag Ghali, who had made an unsuccessful bid to become the secretary general of the MNLA at Zakak and to become the successor to the amenukal of the Ifoghas Tuaregs, started his own group, Ansar Dine, which drew from members of the Ifoghas tribe and Tuareg jihadists. The former faction of the party included prominent figures who were not fully committed to jihadist ideology but were willing to collaborate to achieve shared goals. Eventually, the jihadist faction would gain the upper hand as they had adsorbed AQIM numbers and were favored by Ghali.

Despite historically having difficulty maintaining alliances between secular and Islamist factions, on 10 January 2012, the MNLA and Ansar Dine came to an agreement to combine their forces in their upcoming rebellion. Separately, Ansar Dine formed an alliance with other Salafi Islamist groups, including MOJWA and AQIM. By January 2013, the combined strength of these three groups was estimated at 3,000. Cooperation between these jihadist groups with Boko Haram and Ansaru militants, who came from Nigeria via Niger, was reported during the rebellion. Furthermore, reports during the rebellion indicated that Boko Haram leader Abubakar Shekau was in Gao, receiving shelter after being wounded by Nigerian forces, before leaving in January 2013. The MNLA was de facto allied with the other Jihadist groups. In 2011, the size of the Malian army was around 12,150.

== Tuareg rebellion (January–April 2012) ==
According to Stratfor, the first attack began on 16–17 January 2012 by MNLA militants against a military barracks and a national guard base in Menaka. The attack was thwarted by a government helicopter, forcing the attackers to retreat, though there were reports that Tuareg rebels led by Malian army defector Ag Assalat Habbi may still be in the Menaka area.

Attacks continued on the morning of 17 January against the disorganized and under resourced government forces in the cities of Ménaka, Aguelhok, and Tessalit. Conflicting reports emerged regarding control of these locations during the clashes, with the Malian government releasing a statement on 20 January indicating that the three towns of Menaka, Aguelhoc, and Tessalit had been reclaimed. The strength of this uprising and the use of heavy weapons, which were not present in the previous conflicts, were said to have "surprised" Malian officials and observers.

On 24 January, after cutting off supply lines for two days and receiving reinforcements, rebel forces managed to retake Aguelhok, either due to the Malian army's depletion of ammunition or as part of a tactical withdrawal intended to consolidate forces in Kidal. The following day, the Malian military, with the help of airstrikes, once again recaptured the town. Control of Aguelhok and other settlements continued to shift multiple times.

In response to complaints from soldiers regarding inadequate supplies, poor strategic planning, and a sense of abandonment, the president attempted to reorganize his senior command. Communiqués emphasized the urgent need for a rapid recovery of lost territory. Mali launched air and land counter operations to take back the seized territory, amid protests in southern Mali due growing dissatisfaction over the government's handling of the rebellion.

On 1 February, the MNLA took captured Ménaka, followed by Kidal on 6 February. In March, Ansar Dine emerged publicly through Malian social media, releasing a video showing its fighters taking over the military base at Aguelhok. In the video, the group's deputy leader, Cheikh Ag Aoussa, declared their objective of establishing Sharia law in Mali.

Although the United States Air Force air-dropped supplies in support of the besieged Malian soldiers in Tessalit, several government units abandoned attempts to relieve them. A week later, they retreated to Algeria, leaving its base and the airport in rebel hands. In the end, a large number of government soldiers had been killed, captured, or deserted, and significant amounts of ammunition were either destroyed or captured by MNLA.

The rebels advanced to about 125 kilometers away from Timbuktu and their advance was unchecked when they entered without fighting in the towns of Diré and Goundam. Ansar Dine stated that it had control of the Mali-Algeria border.

=== Coup d'état ===
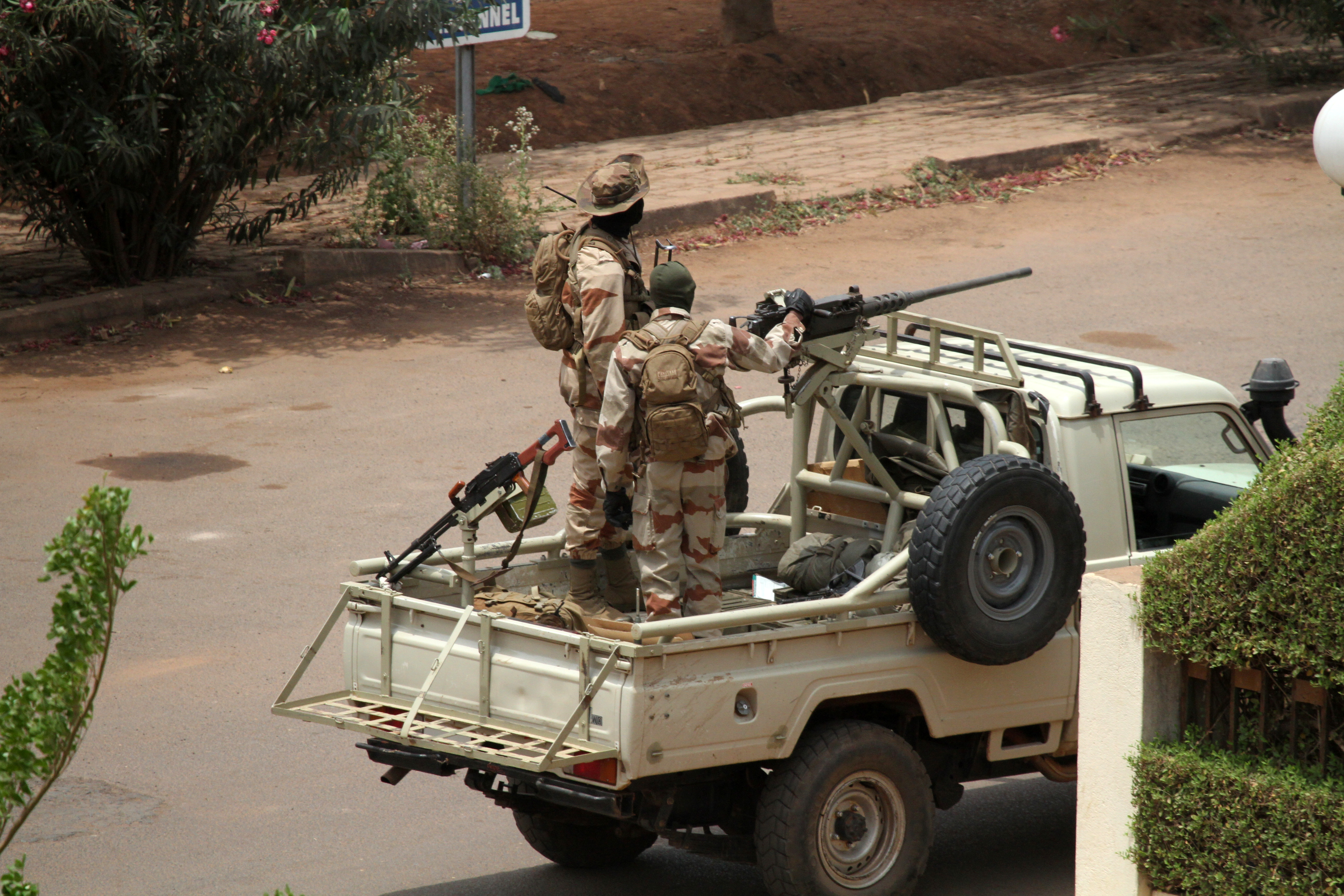
Malian soldiers stand guard outside Kati Barracks in Bamako, October 2012

On 21 March 2012, soldiers displeased with the management of the rebellion attacked several locations in the capital Bamako, including the presidential palace, state television, and military barracks.

The next morning, Captain Amadou Sanogo, the chairman of the new National Committee for the Restoration of Democracy and State (CNRDR), made a statement in which he announced that the junta had suspended Mali's constitution and taken control of the nation. The mutineers cited Touré's alleged poor handling of the insurgency and the lack of equipment for the Malian Army as their reasons for the rebellion. The CNRDR would serve as an interim regime until power could be returned to a new, democratically elected government.

While the coup was widely supported by population, it was "unanimously condemned" by the international community, including by the United Nations Security Council, the African Union, and the Economic Community of West African States (ECOWAS), the latter of which on 27 March imposed sanctions, closed borders, and froze bank accounts, demanding that the coupers leave power before April 6. ECOWAS and the African Union also suspended Mali. The U.S., the World Bank, and the African Development Bank suspended development aid funds in support of ECOWAS and the AU's reactions to the coup.

Côte d'Ivoire President Alassane Ouattara, who was the rotational chairman of ECOWAS, said that once the civilian government was restored an ECOWAS stand-by force of 2,000 soldiers could intervene against the rebellion. Burkina Faso's President Blaise Compaore was appointed as a mediator by ECOWAS to resolve the crisis. On the day of the deadline, the junta and ECOWAS reached an agreement in which both Sanogo and Touré would resign, sanctions would be lifted, the mutineers would be granted amnesty, and power would pass to National Assembly of Mali Speaker Dioncounda Traoré.

Following Traoré's inauguration, he pledged to "wage a total and relentless war" on the Tuareg rebels unless they released their control of northern Malian cities. Despite this de jure transition, Sanogo seemed to remain the "real" head of state. In May, further military setbacks trigged protests in favor of a return to military rule, during which some government soldiers allowed protesters to burst into Traoré's office, where they "grabbed him by the collar and beat him on the head into unconsciousness."

=== Continued offensive ===
During the uncertainty following the coup, resistance put up by government forces in the north began to melt away, allowing the rebels to take over the three provincial capitals of Timbuktu, Kidal, and Gao from 30 March to 1 April. The speed and ease with which the rebels took control of the north was attributed in large part to the confusion created in the army's coup, leading Reuters to describe it as "a spectacular own-goal".

Though the offensive ostensibly included both the MNLA and Ansar Dine, according to Jeremy Keenan of the University of London's School of Oriental and African Studies, Ansar Dine's military contribution was slight: "What seems to happen is that when they move into a town, the MNLA take out the military base – not that there's much resistance – and Iyad [ag Aghaly] goes into town and puts up his flag and starts bossing everyone around about Sharia law."

On 6 April 2012, stating that it had secured all of its desired territory, the MNLA declared independence from Mali, which was rejected as invalid by the African Union and the European Union. Acherif was made President of the Transitional Council of the State of Azawad. In total, at least 1,000 Malian soldiers had been killed, captured, or deserted.

== Islamist–Tuareg nationalist conflict (June–November 2012) ==
As soon as independence was declared, tensions emerged between the MNLA and jihadist groups due to differences in goals with their common enemy defeated. Tuareg nationalists sought to maintain an independent state, while the jihadist wished to spread Islamic rule to the rest of Mali and neighboring states. To avoid open conflict that would jeopardize their control over northern Mali, the MNLA and Ansar Dine entered negotiations in an attempt to reach a political settlement that would satisfy both parties.

On 5 April 2012, Islamists, possibly from AQIM or MOJWA, entered the Algerian consulate in Gao and took hostages. The MNLA succeeded in negotiating their release without violence, and one MNLA commander said that the movement had decided to disarm other armed groups. On 8 April, a mostly Arab militia calling itself the National Liberation Front of Azawad (FNLA) announced its intention to oppose Tuareg rule, battle the MNLA, and "return to peace and economic activity"; the group claimed to consist of 500 fighters. On 26 April, this group briefly took over a part of the region, before withdrawing on the request of AQIM to avoid civilian deaths. Later, they split into several factions, including the pro-rebel MAA-Dissident and pro-government MAA-Tabankort.

The MNLA clashed with protesters in Gao on 14 May, reportedly injuring four and killing one. On 26 May, the MNLA and Ansar Dine to sign a provisional plan make Azawad an Islamic state and merge the two groups into a single regular army. Less than a week later, the agreement was denounced by MNLA political leadership as a betrayal of its secular values, leading their representatives to walk back on the promises in the initial agreement.

On 6 June, residents of Kidal protested against the imposition of Sharia in the town and in support of MNLA, protests which were violently dispersed by Ansar Dine members. The following day, the MNLA announced the formation of its own Transitional Council to govern Azawad, composed entirely of MNLA members. Ansar Dine condemned the move as a violation of the earlier Gao Agreement. The next day, the MNLA encouraged local women and youth to protest against Ansar Dine's implementation Sharia, leading to the two groups clashing in the city with automatic weapons.

In early June, Nigerien president Mahamadou Issoufou stated that Afghan and Pakistani jihadists were training Touareg Islamist rebels.

=== Battle of Gao and aftermath ===
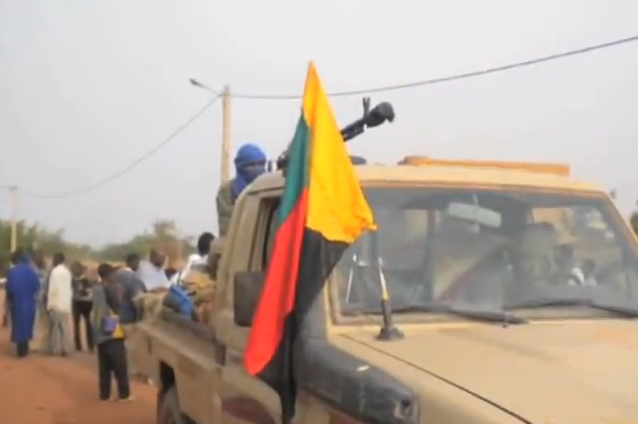
A Tuareg technical in northern Mali

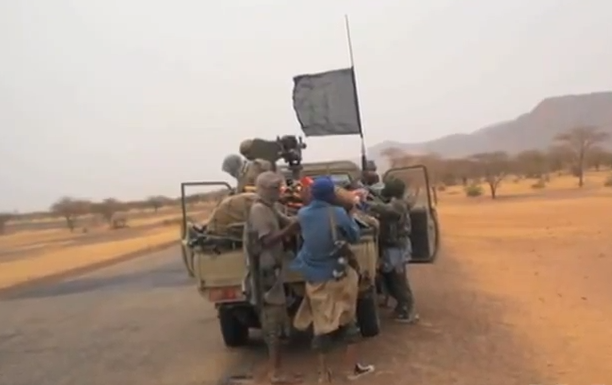
Islamist fighters in northern Mali

Protests broke out on 26 June 2012 in the city of Gao, the majority of whose people are not Tuaregs, but rather sub-Saharan groups such as the Songhay and Fula peoples. The protestors opposed the Tuareg rebels and the partition of Mali. Two were killed as a result of the protests, allegedly by MNLA troops. The protesters used both Malian and Islamist flags, and France 24 reported that many locals supported the Islamists as a result of their opposition to the Tuareg nationalists and the secession of Azawad.

The same day, this tension erupted into all-out combat in Gao between the MNLA and MOJWA, supported by ~100 Boko Haram militants, with both sides deploying heavy weaponry. MNLA Secretary General Acherif was wounded in the battle. The MNLA was soon driven from the city, and subsequently withdrew from Kidal and Timbuktu without resistance, following orders by Ansar Dine. Soon, the jihadist groups had seized control of nearly all of Azawad, with the exception of a few towns and isolated pockets still held by the MNLA and allied militias.

Ghali was named emir of the state, with Abdelhamid Abou Zeid, commander of AQIM's Tariq ibn Ziyad brigade, serving as his second-in-command. Zeid also assumed the role of governor of Timbuktu, which came under the joint control of AQIM and the hardline faction of Ansar Dine. Kidal fell under the authority of the group's more moderate wing, while Gao was administered by MOJWA.

By October 2012, the MNLA retained control of the city of Ménaka, with hundreds of people taking refuge in the city from the rule of the Islamists, and the city of Tinzawatene near the Algerian border. In the same month, a splinter group broke off from the MNLA; calling itself the Front for the Liberation of the Azawad (FPA), the group stated that Tuareg independence was no longer a realistic goal and that they must concentrate on fighting the Islamists.

=== Takeover of Douentza and Ménaka ===
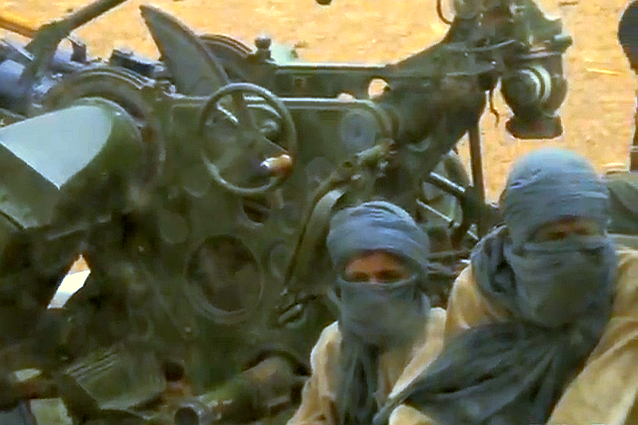
Islamist fighters in northern Mali

On 1 September, MOJWA took over the southern town of Douentza, which had previously been held by a Songhai secular militia, the Ganda Iso. A MOJWA spokesman said that the group had had an agreement with the Ganda Iso, but had decided to occupy the town when the militia appeared to be acting independently, and gained control of the town following a brief standoff with Ganda Iso. Once MOJWA troops surrounded the city, the militia reportedly surrendered without a fight and were disarmed.

On 16 November, Tuareg MNLA forces launched an offensive against Gao in an attempt to retake the town. However, by the end of the day, the Tuaregs were beaten back by the MOJWA forces after the Islamists laid an ambush for them. A Malian security source said that at least a dozen MNLA fighters were killed while the Islamists suffered only one dead. An MNLA official stated that their forces killed 13 MOJWA fighters and wounded 17, while they suffered only nine wounded.

On 19 November, MOJWA and AQIM forces took over the eastern town of Ménaka, which had previously been held by the MNLA, with dozens of fighters from both sides and civilians killed. On the first day of fighting, the MNLA claimed its forces killed 65 Islamist fighters, while they suffered only one dead and 13 wounded. The Islamists for their part stated they killed more than 100 MNLA fighters and captured 20. On 28 November, the AQIM took over Léré without major confrontation. By December, all urban areas had fallen into Islamist hands.

== Foreign intervention (January–June 2013) ==
A map showing the fullest extent of rebel-held territory in January 2013, before it was re-taken by Malian and French forces

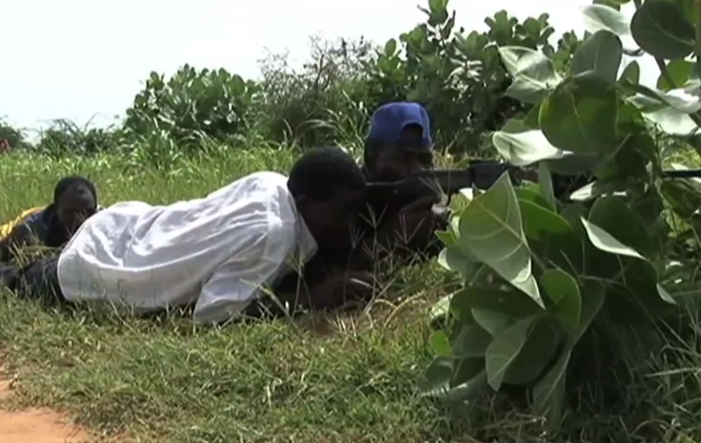
Pro-government militia members training in Sevare

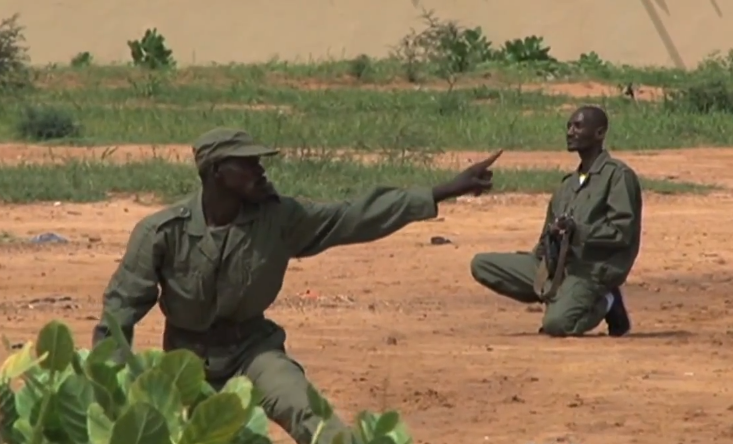
Pro-government militia members training in Sevare

Following requests from both the Mali government and ECOWAS for foreign military intervention, on 12 October 2012 the United Nations Security Council unanimously, under Chapter VII of the United Nations Charter, passed a French resolution approving an African-led force to assist the army of Mali in combating the Islamist militants. The resolution gave 45 days for "detailed and actionable recommendations" for military intervention which would be drafted by ECOWAS and the African Union, with a figure of 3,000 proposed troops reported. A prior ECOWAS plan had been rejected by diplomats as lacking sufficient detail.

While authorising the planning of force, and dedicating UN resources to this planning, UN Security Council Resolution 2071 does not authorize the deployment of force. However, UN Security Council Resolution 2085, passed on 20 December 2012, "authorizes the deployment of an African-led International Support Mission in Mali (AFISMA) for an initial period of one year."

On 8 January 2013, rebels were reported by Al Jazeera to have captured 12 Malian government troops near the town of Konna. On the same day, RFI reports that governmental troops fired warning shots and slightly progressed from Konna toward Douentza.

=== MNLA realigns with the Malian Government ===
The alliance between the Tuareg nationalists and jihadist groups severely damaged the international legitimacy of the broader Tuareg movement. As a result, by December, the now displaced MNLA began peace talks with the Malian government and relinquished its previous goal of Azawadi independence in favor of a request for self-rule within Mali. After the French entry in January 2013, the MNLA spokesman in Paris, Moussa Ag Assarid (who had criticized the splinter group FPA months earlier for giving up on independence) declared that the MNLA was "ready to help" their former opponents in the fight against the Islamists.

At that time, the MNLA controlled no big localities and was only strong in rural and desert areas near the borders with Mauritania, Algeria and Niger, having been driven off from most of its claimed territory by Islamist groups. Soon, it would begin to support French and Chadian forces in restoring state authority to the cities in the north and in operations against their mountain strongholds, particularly with intelligence, while still opposing the Malian army.

=== Battle of Konna and French intervention ===
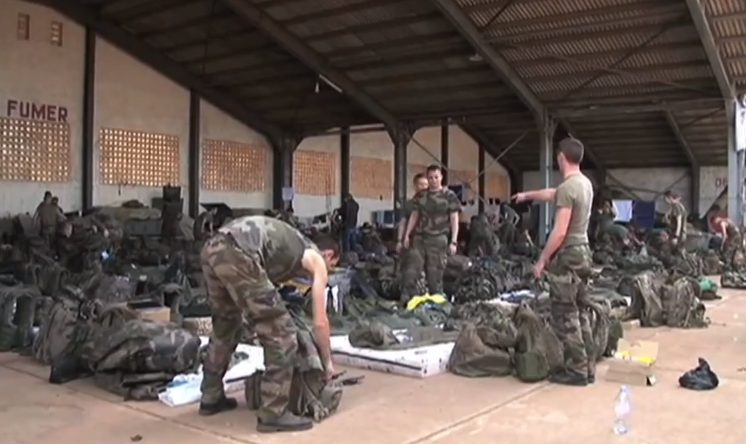
French troops arrived in Bamako.

Despite internal acknowledgment by jihadist leaders that they were too weak to expand, on 10 January 2013, emirate forces captured the strategic town of Konna, 600 km from the capital, from the Malian army. Later, an estimated 1,200 Islamist fighters advanced to within 20 kilometers of Mopti, a nearby Mali military garrison town. Abd al-Aziz Habib, one of the jihadist leaders in the Emirate, later explained in an interview that the offensive had two motives: as a response against repeated abuses of the Muslims, specifically the massacre of a group of Tablighi preachers by government forces in Diabaly in September 2012; and, more plausibly, as a preemptive strike against a Malian military buildup near Azawad's borders and the looming UN intervention.

The planned deployment of AFISMA forces was not scheduled until September, leaving a window for the Islamists to seize strategically important territory. Abdelmalek Droukdel referred to the planned military intervention as "France's proxy war," expressing an expectation that France would remain in the background while Mali's African neighbors carried out the bulk of the fighting, in line with the UN resolution. A direct French military intervention was therefore unexpected, and its launch significantly shortened the potential lifespan of the Emirate.

The rapid offensive forced Traoré to seek help from France, which ordered the deployment of 4,000 troops and significant quantities of military equipment to Mali on 11 January as part of Operation Serval, aimed at halting the Islamist advance and launching a counteroffensive. The operation included the use of Gazelle helicopters from the Special forces, which stopped an Islamist column advancing to Mopti, and the use of four Mirage 2000-D jets of the Armée de l'Air operating from a base in Chad.

Twelve targets were hit by the Mirages overnight between the 11th and the 12th. The French chief of army staff, Édouard Guillaud, announced that the Islamists had withdrawn from Konna and retreated several dozen of kilometres to the north. The air strikes reportedly destroyed half a dozen Islamist armed pick-up trucks and a rebel command center. One French pilot, Lieutenant Damien Boiteux, was killed after his attack helicopter was downed by ground fire during the operation.

During the night of 11 January 2013, the Malian army, backed by French troops, claimed it had regained control of the town of Konna, and claimed to have killed over 100 Islamists. Afterwards, a Malian lieutenant said that mopping up operations were taking place around Konna. AFP witnesses had seen dozens of Islamist corpses around Konna, with one saying he counted 46 bodies. The French stated four rebel vehicles were hit by their airstrikes, while the Malian Army claimed nearly 30 vehicles were bombed. Several dozens of Malian soldiers and 10 civilians were also killed. A resident of Gao, the headquarters of the MOJWA, said that the city's hospital had been overwhelmed with dead and wounded. In all, one local resident counted 148 bodies around Konna.

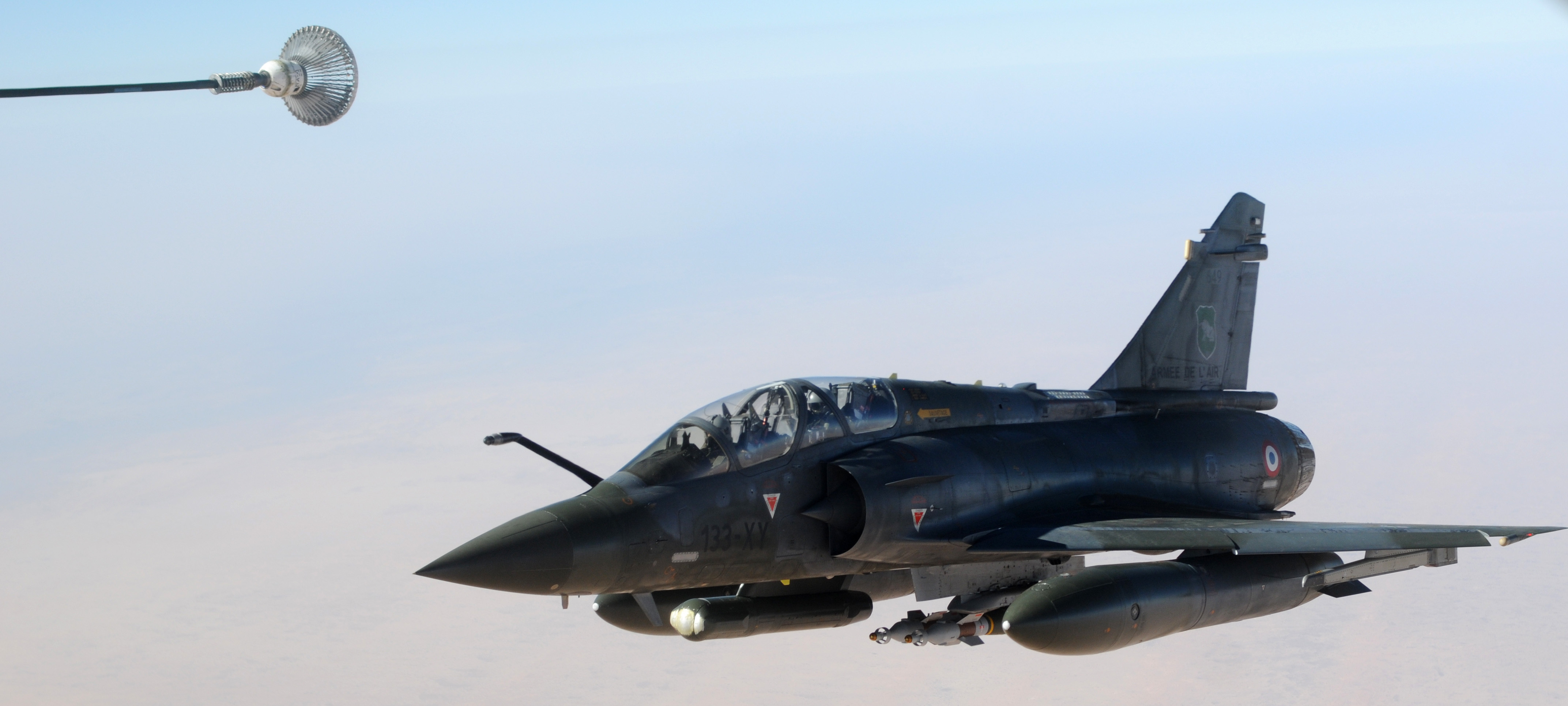
French Mirage 2000 refuels over Africa on 2 February 2013.

In the wake of the French deployment, ECOWAS said that it had ordered troops to be deployed immediately to Mali, the UN Security Council said that the previously planned UN-led force would be deployed in the near future, and the European Union said it had increased preparations for sending military training troops into Mali.

On 12 January, the British government announced that it was deploying two Royal Air Force C-17 transport planes in a non-combat role to ferry primarily French but also potentially African forces into Mali.

On 13 January, regional security sources announced the death in Konna of Abdel Krim, nicknamed "Kojak", a high level leader in the Ansar Dine group. French defense minister Le Drian said that new airstrikes were ongoing in Mali, had happened during the night and would happen the next day. A resident of Léré said that airstrikes had been conducted in the area.

The airstrikes were concentrated on three areas, Konna, Léré and Douentza. Two helicopters were seen attacking Islamist positions in Gao. A dozen strikes targeted the city and its outskirts. A resident reported that all Islamist bases around Gao had been taken out of operation by the strikes. An Islamist base in Kidal was targeted by the French air force. French defence minister Le Drian, announced that four Rafale fighters had participated in the Gao airstrikes. They had left France and were based in Chad.

It was reported that following the strikes that destroyed their bases, the MUJAO forces left Gao. Residents reported that 60 Islamists died in the Gao airstrikes. Others were hiding in the houses and picked up the dead bodies during the night.

On 14 January, the Islamists attacked the city of Diabaly, 400 km north of Bamako in the government-held areas. They came from the Mauritanian border where they fled to avoid the airstrikes. The AQIM leader known as Abu Zeid was leading the operation. On the same day, Islamists pledged to launch attacks on French soil.

On 15 January, the French defense minister confirmed that the Mali military had still not recaptured Konna from rebel forces, despite earlier claims. Meanwhile, the Royal Canadian Air Force dispatched a C-17 transport plane to Mali in a similar role as those of the British C-17s. The Danish Parliament decided to contribute a C-130 transport plane and the Belgian government made the decision to send two C-130s along with one Medical Component Agusta A109 Medevac medical evacuation helicopter along with 80 support personnel to Mali.

=== In Aménas hostage crisis ===
On 16 January, it was reported that a group of AQIM militants had crossed the border from Mali into Algeria and had captured an Algerian/Statoil/BP-owned natural gas field, In Aménas, near the border with Libya. The militants were reported to have killed two foreign nationals and were holding 41 foreign nationals hostage, and a spokesman for the group said that the purpose of the attack was to get revenge on the countries that had intervened in Mali. The hostages reportedly included several American, Japanese, British, Romanian, Filipino and Norwegian citizens. Algeria was reportedly negotiating with the militants to try and obtain the hostages' release. On 19 January, 11 militants and 7 hostages were killed in a final assault to end the standoff. In addition, 16 foreign hostages were freed, including 2 Americans, 2 Germans, and 1 Portuguese.

=== Malian northward advance ===
On 16 January, French special forces, along with the Malian army, began fighting small and mobile groups of jihadists inside the city of Diabaly, but the French defense minister denied the presence of French troops fighting in Diabaly. The government of Spain approved the dispatch of one transport aircraft to Mali for logistical and training support. Meanwhile, the government of Germany authorized the contribution of two Transall C-160 transport aircraft to ferry African troops into the capital Bamako. Likewise, the government of Italy pledged air transport-based logistical support.

On 17 January, Banamba was put on alert after Islamists were reportedly spotted near the town. The Malian army immediately deployed 100 soldiers to the town, which were reinforced later. A convoy of Islamists reportedly left Diabaly and was heading towards Banamba, but ultimately no fighting took place in the town.

On 18 January, the Malian Army released a statement claiming to have complete control of Konna. The claim was confirmed by residents of Konna and a spokesman for Ansar al-Dine. The same day, rebels were driven out of Diabaly according to multiple local sources.

Reports came out on 19 January that residents of Gao had lynched Aliou Toure, a prominent Islamist leader and the MOJWA police commissioner of the city, in retaliation for the killing of a local journalist, Kader Toure. AFP cited local reports saying that the Islamists were beginning to leave other areas under their control to seek refuge in the mountainous and difficult-to-access Kidal Region. On the same day, two Nigerian soldiers were killed and five were injured by Islamists near the Nigerian town of Okene as they were heading toward Mali.

On 20 January, the United States denied that they had attempted to bill the French for American support in the conflict. USAF C-17s began to fly in French troops and supplies the next day.

On 21 January, French and Malian troops entered Diabaly without resistance. Douentza was also taken that day.

On the evening of 24 January Malian soldiers took control of Hombori. On the same day a splinter group of Ansar al-Dine, calling itself the Islamic Movement of Azawad (MIA), stated that it wanted to seek a peaceful solution to the conflict and urged France and Mali to cease hostilities in the north in order "to create a climate of peace which will pave the way for an inclusive political dialogue".

On 26 January, French Special Forces took over the airport and an important bridge in the city of Gao which remained largely Islamist-held. The troops reported "harassment" from Islamist forces but no solid resistance to their operations. The city was taken by a French-backed Malian force later that day.

A new split happened in Ansar Dine, with one of its commanders in Léré, Kamou Ag Meinly, quitting the group and joining the MNLA.

On 27 January, French and Malian forces encircled Timbuktu and began securing the city. After gaining the airport on 27 January, the next day, Malian and French military sources claimed that the entire area between Gao and Timbuktu was under government control and access to the city was available. The city was fully taken by French and Malian forces by the next day.

On 28 January, the MNLA took control of Kidal with the help of the MIA, an Ansar Dine breakaway group that split after the international intervention. The MNLA also took control of the towns of Tessalit and Khalil. Apparently, fighters who had deserted the MNLA for the better financed Ansar Dine were now returning to the MNLA. Islamists were reported to have fled to the mountains.

On 29 January, the first non-Malian African troops entered North Mali. Nigerien soldiers occupied Ansongo and Chadian troops, Ménaka. The more numerous Chadian Army was also reported as moving north from Ménaka in support of the Malian Army.

On 30 January, French troops reached Kidal airport. No Malian soldiers were with them, as a confrontation with Tuaregs was feared. The town was reportedly under control of fighters from both the MNLA and MIA. The MNLA, however, denied any collaboration or even a desire to collaborate with the MIA, and stated that their fighters were maintaining control of the town alongside French forces. Many leaders of Ansar Dine left Iyad Ag Ghali. Delegations from the MNLA and MIA left for Ouagadougou to negotiate with Malian officials.

On 2 February, Chadian troops from MISMA reached Kidal and were stationed in a deserted base in the city. Their general said that they had no problem with the MNLA and had good relations with them. On the same day, the French President, François Hollande, joined Traoré in a public appearance in recently recaptured Timbuktu.

On 8 February, French and Chadian troops announced that they had occupied Tessalit near the Algerian border, the location of one of the last airports still not controlled by the Malian government and its allies.

== Insurgency (2013–2023) ==
=== Beginning of guerrilla phase ===
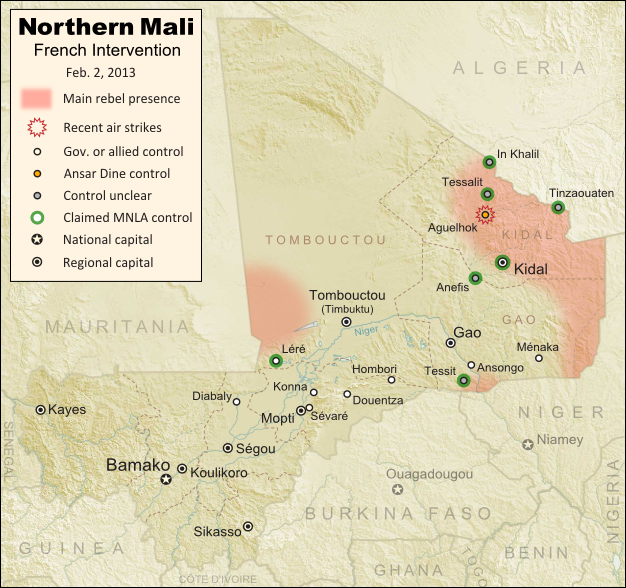
The situation on 2 February 2013

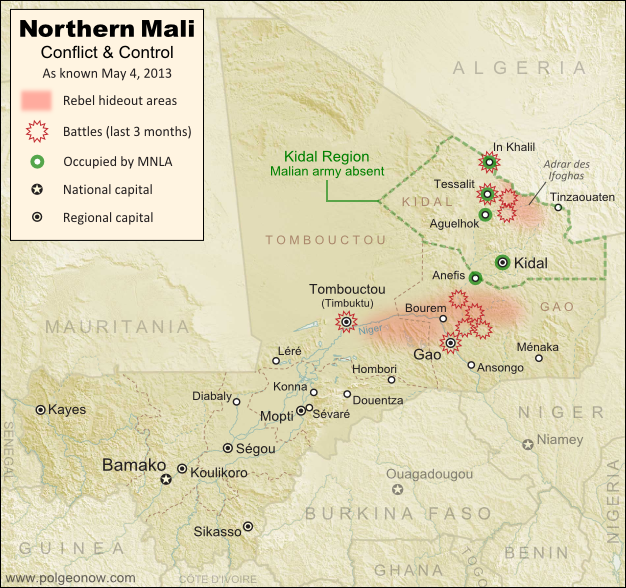
The situation on 4 May 2013

The Islamists, facing a fierce international campaign of airstrikes, retreated to the Adrar des Ifoghas, rugged badlands in northeastern Mali, where knowledge of and control over local sources of water would play a vital role in continuing the conflict in that area. Others embedded themselves in local communities or sought refuge in the remote parts of Niger and Mauritania, while Ansaru and Boko Haram retreated back to Nigeria. This move significantly reduced their access to funding needed to pay fighters, leading to many militants to return to the MNLA. On 19 February, France began a new operation (Panther) intended to subdue the region.

Between 8 and 10 February, MUJAO – who had been harassing government forces from the outskirts since Malian and French forces took the city on 26 January – launched the first two suicide attacks of the war in Gao, resulting in the death of the two bombers and injuring a Malian soldier and a civilian. Islamist fighters armed with AK-47s then crossed the Niger River on canoes, took over an abandoned police station and deployed snipers in nearby buildings in anticipation of the government forces' counterattack. The situation was controlled by pro-government forces after heavy fighting which included an air attack on the police station by French helicopters.

On 18 February, at the request of the Malian government, the European Union launched the European Union Training Mission in Mali (EUTM Mali), deploying 550 troops from 22 EU states under the command of Brigadier-General Marc Rudkiewicz.

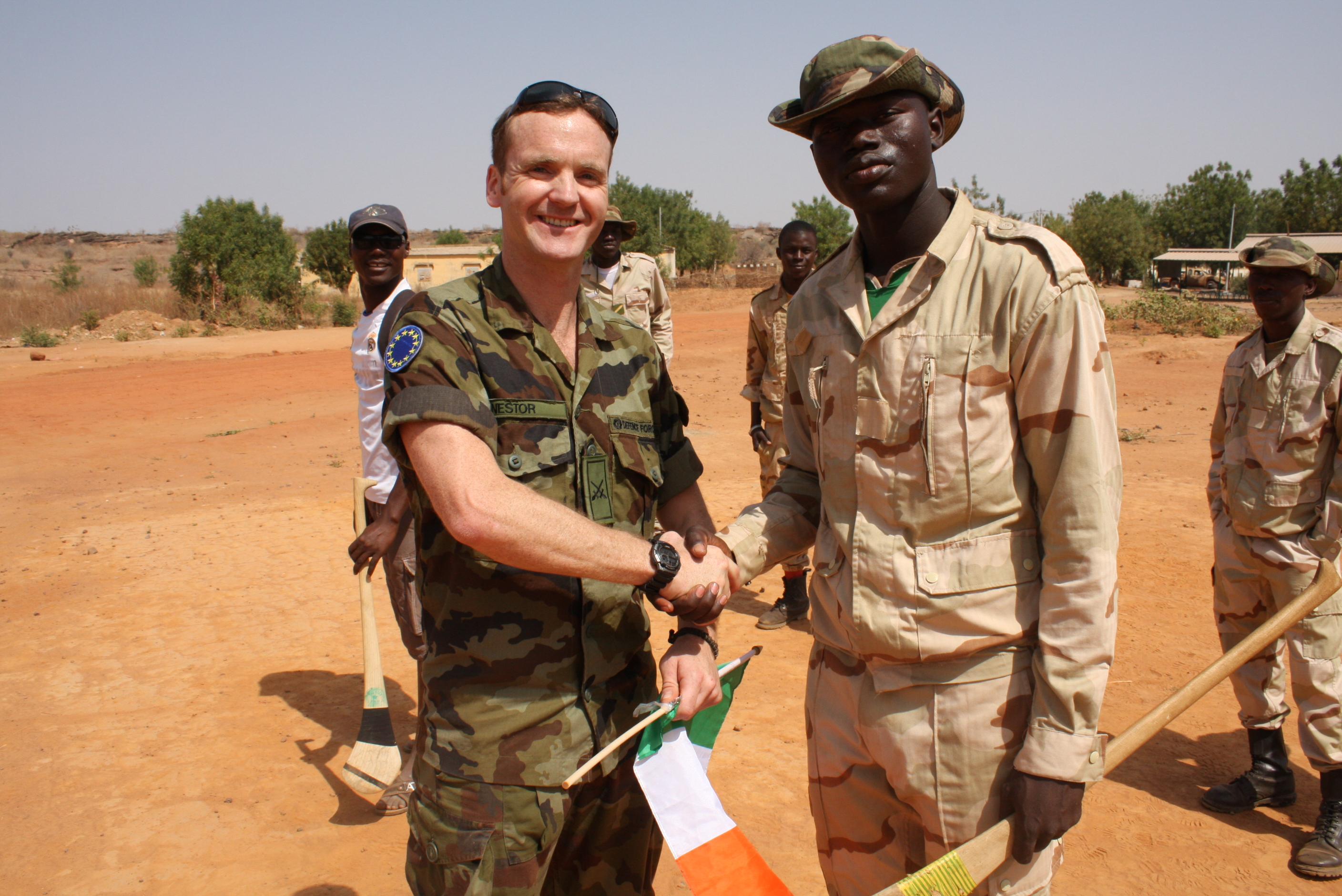
EUTM Comdt Mick Nestor congratulates a Malian soldier for his efforts in the International Poc Fada

On 19 February, Islamists attacked a French parachute regiment of 150 soldiers supported by a heavy vehicle patrol and Mirage fighter jets. One French commando, a sergeant, was killed and so were 20 Islamist militants.

Gao was attacked a second time on 20 February. Islamists again crossed the Niger and came close to the city hall, possibly with help from locals. The same day, a car bomb exploded in Kidal, killing two people. The fighting in Gao subsided after five Islamists were killed by Malian soldiers.

On 22 February 2013, 13 Chadian soldiers and 65 Islamists were killed during heavy fighting in the northern mountains. The same day two suicide bombers crashed their cars into the MNLA's local operations center in the town of in Khalil, killing 5 people including 3 MNLA fighters and both bombers.

U. S. President Obama announced on 22 February 2013 that about 100 American troops had been sent to Niger, which borders Mali, to aid the French in Mali. The most recent U. S. troops were sent to help set up a new air base, from which to conduct surveillance against Al Qaeda. 40 U.S. Air Force logistics specialists, intelligence analysts and security officers arrived in the capital of Niger on 20 February 2013, bringing the total Americans deployed in Niger to 100.

On 24 February, 28 Islamists and ten Chadian soldiers were killed while fighting in the Adrar des Ifoghas mountains in Northern Mali.

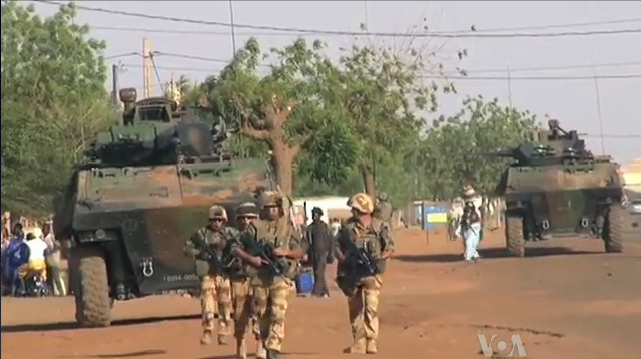
French soldiers in Gao, March or April 2013

On 26 February, a car bomb exploded in Kidal targeting a MNLA checkpoint. At least 7 MNLA fighters along with the suicide bomber were killed in the attack.

On 20 March, AQIM claimed to have executed a French hostage in Mali, Phillipe Verdon, who had been kidnapped in 2011.

On 23 March, Islamist fighters from MUJAO attacked the city of Gao, causing heavy fighting for two hours. The Malian army eventually repulsed this attack.

On 30 March, a suicide bomber detonated his explosives near a Malian army checkpoint in Timbuktu, allowing a group of jihadists to infiltrate by night. By 1 April, with the help of a French army detachment supported by war jets, the Malian army pushed the jihadists out of the city center.

On 28 February, Algerian television informed that Abdelhamid Abou Zeid, one of the three top men of AQIM and deemed responsible of several kidnappings of westerners in the Sahel in the 2000s, had been killed in battle against Franco-Chadian forces in the Tigharghar mountains along with about 40 of his followers, some kilometres away from Aguelhok. The information was neither confirmed nor denied by the French Army.

On 2 March, it was reported that Mokhtar Belmokhtar, mastermind of the In Amenas hostage crisis in which 800 hostages had been taken and 39 Westerners killed at an Algerian oil refinery, had been killed as well. Chadian state television announced that "Chadian forces in Mali completely destroyed the main jihadist base in the Adrar de Ifhogas mountains... killing several terrorists including leader Mokhtar Belmokhtar", according to a BBC report. BBC correspondent Thomas Fessy said this would be a major blow if confirmed.

On 4 March, Al Qaeda's North African branch confirmed the death of Abou Zeid, but denied that Belmokhtar had been killed.

On 14 April 2013, Chadian president Idriss Déby Itno announced the full withdrawal of the around 2,000 Chadian Forces in Mali (FATIM), saying that face-to-face fighting with Islamists is over, and the Chadian army does not have the skills to fight a guerilla-style war. This announcement came days after a suicide bomber killed four Chadian soldiers in Kidal

Now that the bulk of the conflict is over and the need for extended military involvement is decreasing, France looks to the UN to take over with the peacekeeping force that had been suggested earlier in the conflict once it was a more stable situation. The operation was termed MINUSMA.

In May, the High Council of Azawad (HCA) and MIA merged to form the High Council for the Unity of Azawad (HCUA). The group was founded by Amenokal of the Ifoghas, Alghabass Ag Intalla, and led by his older brother, Mohamed Ag Intalla, a former high-ranking member in the MNLA and Ansar Dine. Despite their rivalry with Ghali over leadership of the Ifoghas, they absorbed many former Ansar Dine members.

Initially refusing to disarm or cede control of places they had captured to the Malian government, the MNLA, in June, signed a peace deal in which government forces could return to some cities, leading to pro-MNLA and pro-government demonstrations in Kidal. The MNLA ended the ceasefire in September of the same year after government forces opened fire on unarmed protesters. Following the attack, MNLA vice-president Mahamadou Djeri Maiga remarked: "What happened is a declaration of war. We will deliver this war. Wherever we find the Malian army we will launch the assault against them. It will be automatic. The warnings are over." One of the MNLA's founders, Attaye Ag Mohamed, was also quoted as saying that the "political and military wings of the Azawad" had declared "the lifting of the ceasefire with the central government".

=== Keïta presidency ===
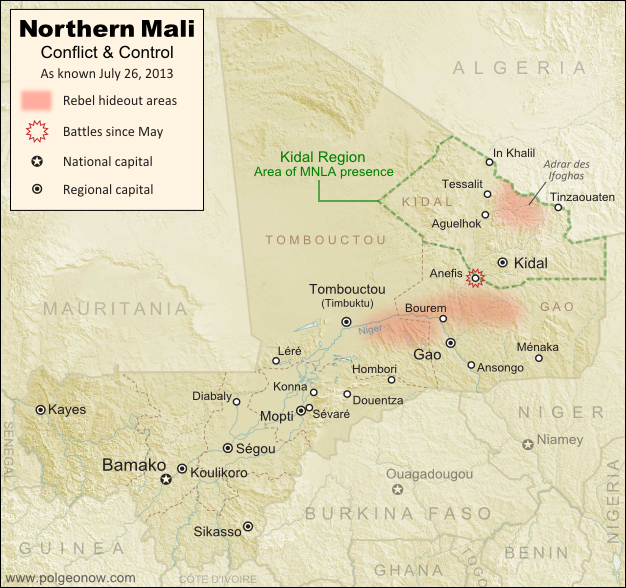
The situation on July 26, a few days before the election

Perennial candidate and career politician Ibrahim Boubacar Keita of the Rally for Mali won the 2013 Malian presidential election on his third bid. His victory was largely attributed to support from influential Islamist figures, primarily "people's imam" Mahmoud Dicko, as well as backing from the military, including the leaders of the 2012 coup. Keita's rise to power represented a continuation of the political establishment that had prevailed under former presidents Touré and Konaré. He assumed office at a time when, thanks to French, African, and international military support, government forces had regained most of the territory previously controlled by Islamists and Tuareg nationalists, territory that would, within a few years, slip out of state control once again.

On 22 August, MUJAO and Al-Mulathameen merged to form the Al-Mourabitoun, with a new leader whose identity was kept hidden. Clashes between the MNLA and the government would continue throughout 2013–2014. One such event in May 2014, during a prime ministerial visit to Kidal, precipitated to the formation of the pro-government militias such as the Imghad Tuareg Self-Defense Group and Allies (GATIA) and MAA-Tabankort.

Later, to facilitate peace talks, most non-jihadist armed groups agreed to join either the rebel Coordination of Azawad Movements (CMA), mainly composed of the MNLA, HCUA, and MAA-D; or the pro-government Plateforme coalition. Rather than resolve tensions, the negotiations served to exacerbate intra and inter-communal tensions in northern Mali. This led to increased fragmentation among armed groups, the outbreak of new localized conflicts, and the proliferation of self-defense militias, further destabilizing the region.

The government's strategy of leveraging tribal and clan rivalries led several factions to withdraw from the CMA. Many came to view the alliance as aggravating conflict rather than promoting reconciliation. Among the groups that broke away were the Coalition of the People of Azawad (CPA), the Congress for Justice in Azawad (CJA), and the Coordination of Patriotic Resistance Movements and Fronts II (CMFPR-II), led by Ganda Izo leader Ibrahim Abba Kantao.

In June 2015, these negotiations culminated in the Algiers Accords, which aimed to decentralize the Malian state, integrate former rebels into the national army, and promote economic development in the north. Pushed through by a frustrated international community, the accord was "widely regarded in the north as an imposed agreement that does not address the often subtle and deep-rooted grievances that fuel the ongoing conflict", serving to only deepened divisions between the signatory parties.

In 2015, a portion of the Al-Mourabitoun under the leadership of Adnan Abu Walid al-Sahraoui pledged allegiance to Islamic State caliph Abu Bakr al-Baghdadi, forming the Islamic State – Sahel Province (ISSP). Initially based in the vicinity of Gao, the group expanded its influence significantly by attracting support from segments of the local population, particularly among the Fulani communities, whom the ISSP promised patronge and protection from Tuareg raids. By 2022, ISSP had gained control over the Liptako-Gourma region.

In September 2016, due to the unilateral management of the CMA and the predominance of the recurring Imghad-Ifoghas conflict over Kidal, Moussa Ag Acharatoumane split from the MNLA and founded the Ménaka-based Movement for the Salvation of Azawad (MSA). The two clans that mostly composed the group, the Daoussahak and Chamanamas, split into the MSA-D and MSA-C, respectively, in 2017. The MSA-D later fractured further, with a portion returning to the CMA and the remainder aligning with the platform in July 2019. With the help of Acharatoumane's mediation, the CMA and platform would cooperate, despite clashes between the two occurring, until 2017. Later that year, the CPA, CJA, CMFPR-II, MSA-C, and FPA, along with other CMA/Plateforme dissident groups, formed the rival Coordination of Inclusivity Movements (CMI).

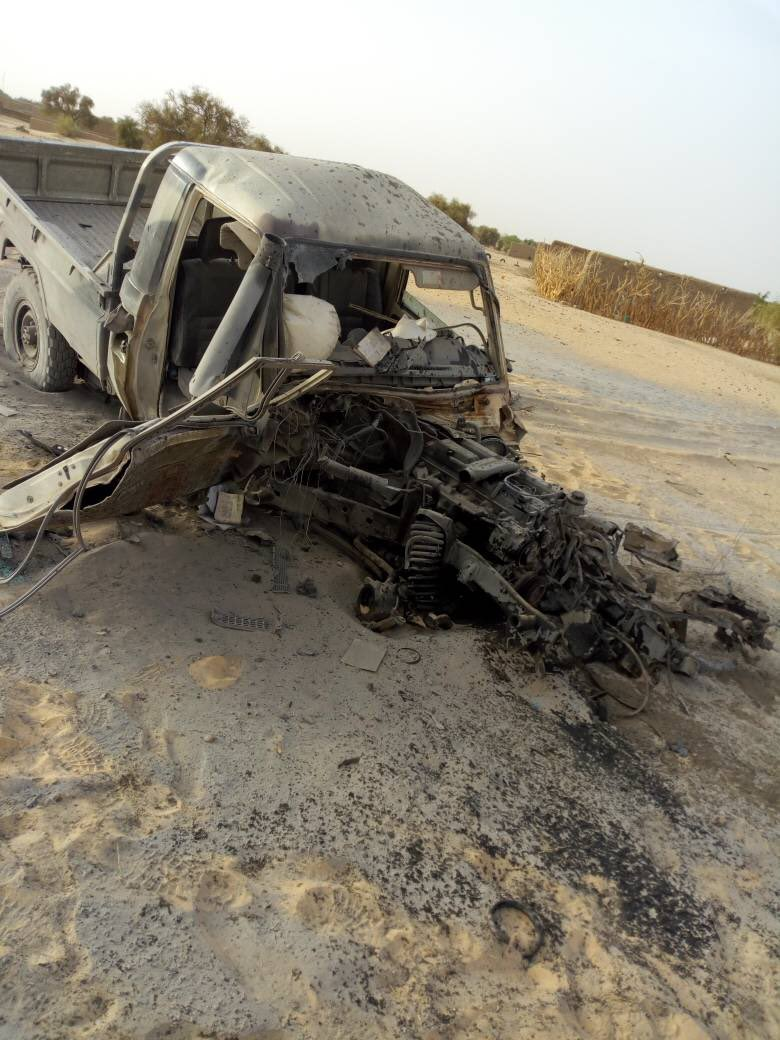
A Malian army vehicle that was struck by an IED near Léré, Timbuktu region, 2018

Also in 2017, Ansar Dine, the Sahara branch of AQIM, Katiba Macina, and the rest of Al-Mourabitoun merged to form the Jama'at Nasr al-Islam wal-Muslimin (JNIM), under the leadship of Ghali, pledging allegiance to Ayman al-Zawahiri, then-leader of al-Qaeda. From the founding of the ISSP, the proxy groups of ISIS and al-Qaeda in the country, in what researchers called the "Sahel exception" or "Sahel anomaly", peacefully co-existed in their fights against the Malian government and her allies.

By the first half of 2018, rebel attacks had intensified significantly, and by July of that year, northern Mali had largely slipped from government control. Jihadist activity was no longer confined to the north; it expanded rapidly into central Mali. By 2020, some estimates suggested that only one-third of the country remained under government authority. The "jihadist idyll" ended in 2019 when open conflict broke out between JNIM and the ISSP. The rivalry escalated into an all-time height in April 2020, with full-scale armed clashes occurring over a large territory and resulting in the deaths of around a thousand Islamic militants.

=== 2020 coup ===
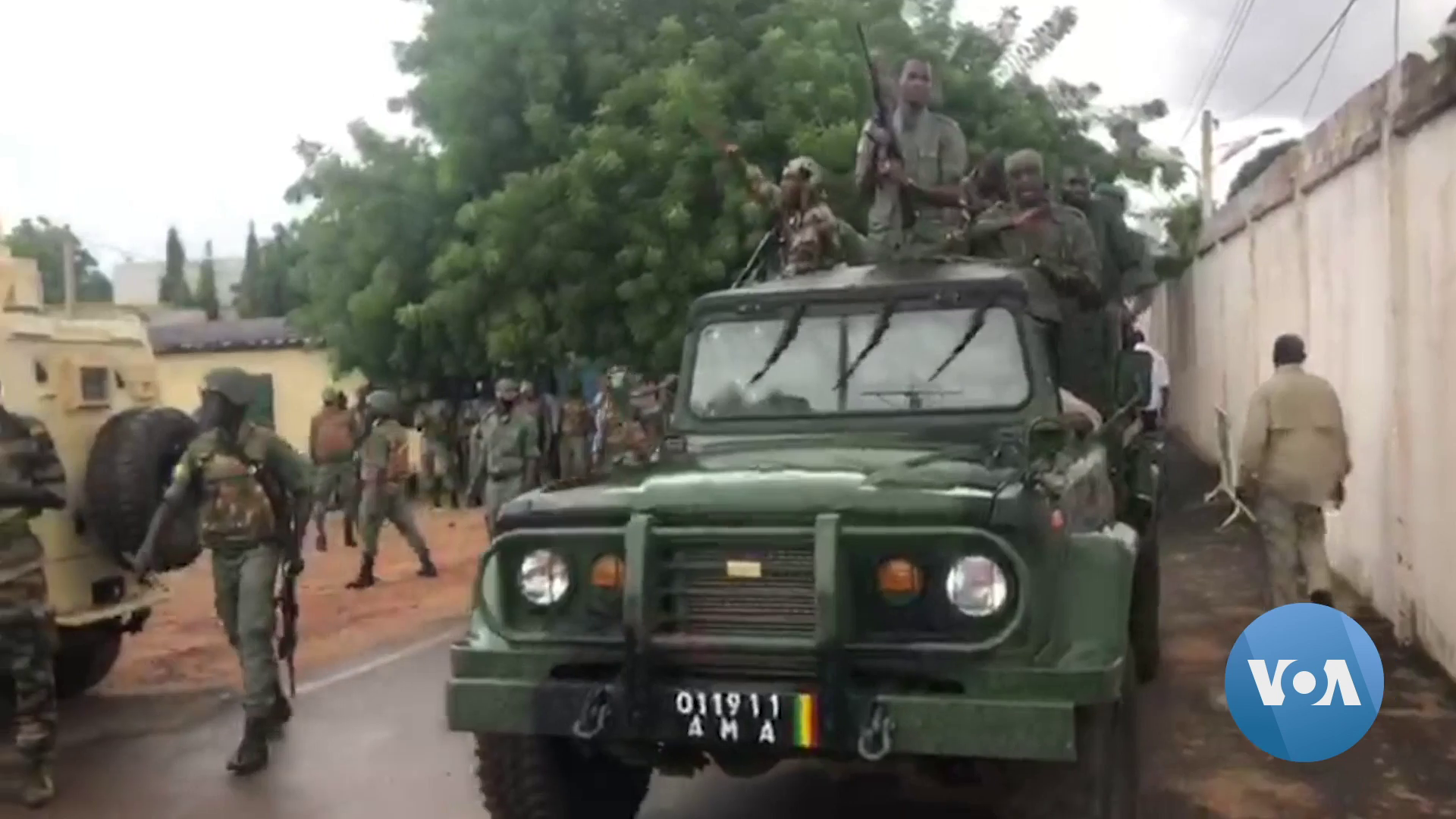
Streets of Bamako during the coup

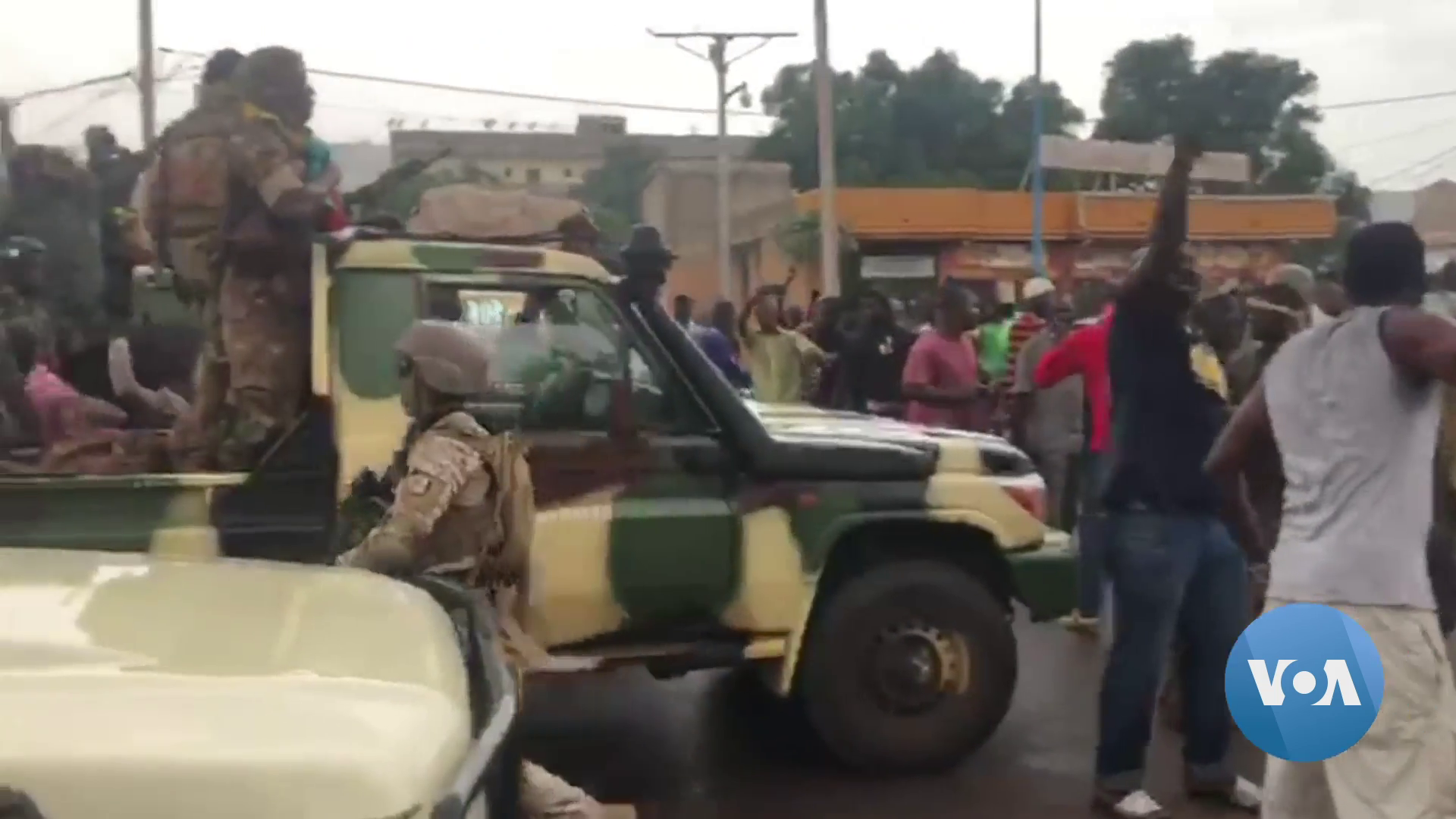
Streets of Bamako during the coup

According to some experts, Keita's presidency was among the worst in Mali's history. Not only had severe military defeats occurred under his rule, his administration failed to diversify the economy among several deeply rooted problems. His rule was marked by widespread corruption and nepotism, such as when he appointed his son to head the National Defense Committee, whose funds were allegedly misused for personal expenses, according to investigative journalists.

While most Malians struggled to make ends meet, footage of his son vacationing on a luxury yacht circulated on social media in the summer of 2020, fueling public outrage. Additionally, he was suspected by the international community of involvement in the disappearance of Le Sphinx journalist Birama Touré, who had reportedly been investigating his affairs. Meanwhile, incompetence in Keita's administration led to the collapse of essential public services, including education, healthcare, and the justice system. Economic hardship was further exacerbated by famine and restrictions related to the COVID-19 pandemic.

Even before the 2018 Malian presidential election, protests had already taken place against his rule. These only intensified after his victory, leading the government to begin using force to suppress dissent. The repeated postponement of the 2020 Malian parliamentary election, originally scheduled for 2018, became another grievance in the long list, compounded by the cancellation of opposition victories and the kidnapping of an opposition leader.

Initially peaceful protests erupted in May 2020 demanding Keïta's resignation, with one of their leaders being Dicko. On June 5, a protest drew tens of thousands of people to Bamako and other cities, with participation from various military, political, civil, and religious figures. This widespread dissatisfaction with the president's policies united military figures involved in the 2012 coup, former officials from Keita's administration, and Islamic leaders. The opposition consolidated into the June 5 Movement, and clashes broke out between protesters and the police.

The movement voiced frustrations over the government's slow pace of reform, poor public services, a crumbling education system, and the continued presence of French forces. Although Keïta attempted to make concessions, they were widely seen as inadequate. By July, protests had turned increasingly violent. Demonstrators set fire to the National Assembly, occupied government buildings, and erected blockades on bridges into the capital. Leaders of the July 10th demonstrations, including former ministers, were arrested. Dicko later turned himself in to police in solidarity with the detained activists.

Protests resumed a month later. On 17 August, opposition leaders declared they would protest daily until Keïta stepped down. The following day, elements of the Malian armed forces, led by Special Forces Col. Assimi Goita, began a mutiny, and subsequently undertook a coup d'état against Keita and his PM. The following day, Keita announced his resignation and dissolved parliament, stating that he did not wish to remain in power at the cost of bloodshed.

The coup leaders, suspected of having ties with Russia, took the name the National Committee for the Salvation of the People. They justified their actions by citing years of bad governance, corruption, nepotism, and deteriorating security. While it was condemned by the international community, with ECOWAS withdrawing its Malian representatives, the takeover was supported by much of the country's youth, though a significant portion of the middle class and intellectuals opposed the seizure of power. Bah Ndaw was later appointed interim president, though it was presumed he would act as a figurehead, as Goita, being in the military, would have been controversial in the eyes of Western governments. The combined size of Mali and paramilitary forces in 2020 was around 41,000.

=== 2021–2022: growing French resentment and Russian and Turkish intervention ===
In January 2021, French forces launched a counterinsurgency campaign known as Operation Éclipse, which included a controversial French airstrike that killed 19 civilians taking part in a wedding.

Despite pro-independence protests, disarmament. demobilization, and reintegration (DDR) talks between the CMA and Mali continued into 2021. In May, following negotiations aimed at resolving disputes over the Algiers Accords, the CMA and Platform formed the Strategic Framework for the Defense of the People of Azawad (CSP-PSD, shorten to CSP) coalition. Their first provisional president was Acherif.

==== 2021 coup and aftermath ====
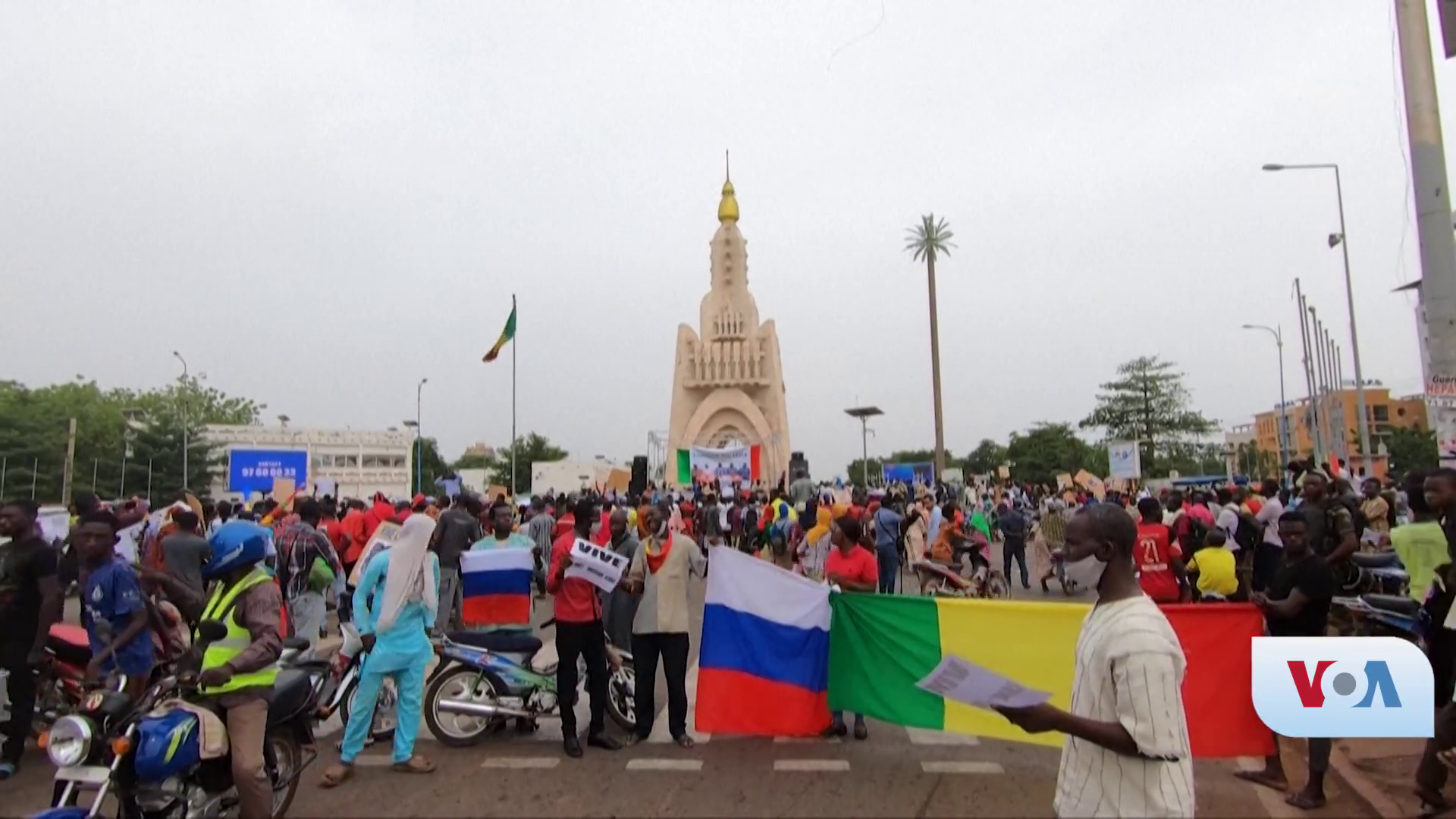
A demonstration in support of the military in Bamako after the 2021 coup

After coming to power, Ndaw began to clash with members of the National Transitional Council (CNT) over policy differences. Ndaw and his Prime Minister, Moctar Ouane, were in favor of cooperation with France, while Vice President Goita and Defense Minister Sadio Camara were in favor of cooperation with Russia. On May 24, 2021, Ndaw and Ouane were detained by the military and taken to the Kati military base. Two days later, Goita announced that both had been stripped of their powers, accusing them of attempting to "sabotage" the transition to a democratically elected government. Goita announced that next elections would be held in 2022. Following these events, Goita assumed the presidency and legislative functions were transferred to the CNT.

In September 2021, the junta began negotiations to hire 1,000 mercenaries from the Russian-funded private military contractor Wagner Group, something France warned against. By the end of the year, hundreds of Wagner mercenaries began deploying across Mali, prompting strong objections from the international forces. Following the announcement of a five-year transition timeline by the junta in January 2022, ECOWAS imposed sweeping sanctions against Mali. These were largely lifted in July 2022 after the junta revised the timeline to a two-year transition, with presidential elections set for February 2024. In September 2023, the election was postponed indefinitely and protests were banned.

Wagner was soon implicated in serious human rights violations such as numerous massacres, including one in March 2022 where they massacred 500 civilians, extrajudicial executions, and incidents of sexual violence. In response to media coverage of these exactions, the Malian government suspended the broadcasts of French news outlets RFI and France 24. In mid-February 2022, Canada, France, and its European partners announced a full troop withdrawal within six months, citing Wagner's presence, with French President Emmanuel Macron declaring, "We cannot remain militarily engaged alongside de facto authorities whose strategy or hidden objectives we share neither".

Following mass protests in Bamako in April 2022 against France and ECOWAS, the transitional government withdrew from its defense agreements with France and announced further political, economic, and security cooperation with Russia. By August 15, 2022, French troops had fully withdrawn from Mali towards Niger, ending their presence in the country. On Independence Day, hundreds marched again, carrying Russian flags and chanting anti-UN slogans.

== CMA rebels, Mali counteroffensive, and JNIM escalation (August 2022–present) ==
In August, negotiations resumed between the CSP and the junta to address the stalled implementation of the Algiers Accords and continue DDR talks. They agreed on the gradual integration of 26,000 CSP fighters into the national army, including the incorporation of senior CSP officers into the military hierarchy, which the CMA criticised due to the lack of clarity regarding the future roles of CSP commanders within the integrated units. Tensions between the parties escalated following the agreement. By December, the CSP withdrew from peace talks, accusing the junta of refusing to negotiate or implement the 2015 agreement, and inaction in response to escalating jihadist and state violence in northern cities, which had left hundreds dead and thousands displaced.

Intensified Inter-Jihadist fighting over control of the north occurred between September 2022 and July 2023, before abating in August 2023.

=== Renewed conflict with CMA, CSP split ===
Throughout 2023, the transitional government consistently obstructed the CSP's efforts to activate the accord's international mediation framework, repeatedly rejecting Algerian offers to host dialogue sessions. Jihadists took advantage of the resulting deadlock, and later vacuum created by the departure of international forces, expanding their control over vast rural areas of the north. In February, the groups making up the CMA formally merged into a single organization.

In June, Goita further strengthened his control through a cabinet reshuffle and the adoption of a new constitution, which passed in a questionable referendum. The CSP, which prevented the referendum from taking place in its stronghold of Kidal, subsequently lost two of the four ministerial posts it previously held, which were reassigned to regime loyalists.

On 16 June 2023, the junta requested that MINUSMA peacekeepers withdraw from Mali without delay. On 30 June 2023, the UN Security Council approved the request for the removal of peacekeepers. In July, MINUSMA, which at that point numbered 10,116 troops, started to transfer control of its 12 military bases to the Malian authorities. This sparked tensions between the government and the CSP, particularly over bases located at Ber and in the Kidal region, which they argued, under the accords, they were entitled to, even if small army units may be located there. They would not allow the army to take over the bases without prior negotiations.

On 11 August, the CSP and junta forces, along with Wagner, clashed as they vied for control of the Ber base, from which MINUSMA had not yet fully withdrawn. The army seized the base two days later, following the departure of the last UN personnel. The next month, after previously accusing the junta and Wagner of multiple ceasefire and human rights violations, the CMA declared war on the government, leading to the Platform, with the exception of a GATIA faction led by Fahad Ag Almahmoud, leaving the CSP.

Amidst the withdrawals, CSP forces continued to attack Mali and Wagner troops, temporarily seizing several military camps and posts across the north and shooting down multiple aircraft, including Mali's only Sukhoi Su-25. On 9 September, JNIM also claimed responsibility for shooting down a Mi-8 helicopter operated by PMC Wagner; visual evidence published by the group confirms the helicopter's destruction.

=== 2023–2024 Mali counteroffensive ===
Following the CSP's capture of Anefis in October 2023, Mali and Wagner forces launched an offensive towards the CMA stronghold of Kidal. Their primary targets were the towns of Tessalit and Aguelhok, both of which still housed MINUSMA military bases at the time. Clashes erupted around Anefis on 6 October, with both the Malian army and the rebels claiming control of the town by day's end. A CSP spokesman later acknowledged that the Malian army had secured Anefis. Ben Bella of the CMA claimed that fighters from Niger, Algeria, and Libya were coming to help them in the conflict, while a Nigerien rebel leader called on fighters to "join them [the rebels] on the front line".

By 15 November, following clashes triggered by the UN's early withdrawal from its base, junta and Wagner forces captured Kidal. Their victory was aided by drones strikes from Turkish-made Bayraktar TB2s, which disrupted CSP defensives and forced fighters to abandon their positions without engaging in sustained ground combat. Nevertheless, according to the Crisis Group, neither the junta nor CSP was in a position to decisively win the war, with CSP remained entrenched in rural areas.

In December, the CSP began to blockade the now government-controlled Kidal, Ménaka, Gao, Taoudeni, and Timbuktu, which had already been periodically blockaded by JNIM, as well as the roads leading to Mauritania, Algeria, and Niger. On 20 December, the junta recaptured Aguelhok, the last vacated UN camp held by the CSP. In January 2024, accusing Algeria of interfering in its affairs, the junta terminated the accords and launched a new national peace initiative, which the CSP swiftly rejected, claiming it sidelined international mediation.

On 9 February 2024, Wagner and Malian forces captured the Intahaka mine in Gao region.

On 29 April, it was reported that Abu Huzeifa, a commander for a Sahelian affiliate of Islamic State (ISGS) was killed during an operation in Menaka region by Malian army. He was involved in Tongo Tongo ambush which killed four U.S. soldiers and four Nigerien soldiers in neighbouring Niger.

On 30 April, in an ambush planned by jihadists, ten pro-Government militiamen were killed outside Gao.

On 3 July, an attack by jihadists in a village in central Mali killed about 40 civilians.

On 24 July, the Malian army and Wagner forces captured the town of In-Afarak, near the Algerian border, from CMA rebels, but the settlement was recaptured by the rebels days later.

On 27 July, Tuareg rebels claimed to have killed dozens of Malian and Wagner group soldiers in an ambush near the settlement of Tinzaouaten. They also shot down a helicopter, which crashed near Kidal. Reports from pro-Russian bloggers suggest that about 50–60 soldiers including 20 Wagner soldiers were killed in the ambush. The rebels announced that they suffered 7 deaths and 12 injuries in the fighting.

On 17 August, an attack by JNIM militants killed about 15 Malian soldiers. Malian soldiers also fired back causing unknown militant casualties in the Mopti region, near the town of Diallassagou.

On 20 August, Burkina Faso, Mali and Niger wrote to the United Nations Security Council, complaining about Ukraine's support for rebel groups in the Sahel region.

On 27 August, an alleged drone strike by the Malian army killed about 21 civilians in Tinzaouaten.

On 17 September 2024, JNIM militants attacked a military training school and airport in the capital Bamako, killing more than 77 people and injuring 255 others. Among the dead were army personnel. At least 20 militants were captured.

=== FLA ===
From 26 to 30 November, the members of the CSP held a meeting in their new stronghold of Tinzawatène, where they dissolved themselves and merged into the Azawad Liberation Front (FLA), officially returning to demands for the independence of Azawad. Hours later, the next morning, Mali launched several drone strikes on the town, killing eight members, including senior officials such as Almahmoud.

In December, Mali, which had been increasingly relying on drones to compensate for its limited manpower and resources, acquired at least two Turkish Baykar Bayraktar Akıncı drones.

On 1 April 2025, the FLA claimed responsibility for shooting down an aircraft belonging to the "terrorist junta in Bamako." Algeria later stated it had shot down the Malian "armed reconnaissance drone", an Akıncı, near its town of Tin Zaouatine, the twin city of Tinzawatène. Algeria claimed that the drone, the third one since August 2024, was on "an offensive trajectory". Mali, initially claiming the drone had crashed near Tinzawatène, asserted it was directed towards armed groups "that have claimed responsibility for terrorist acts". Following an investigation, Mali condemned Algeria's actions as "hostille", accusing it of sponsoring international terrorism.

In response to the escalating tensions, both the Alliance of Sahel States members and Algeria withdrew their respective ambassadors, and Mali and Algeria banned each other's aircraft from entering their airspaces. Algeria continued to host several prominent Malian figures whom it considers key to reviving dialogue and resolving the conflict, including Intalla, now a senior member of the FLA, and Dicko, a staunch advocate of negotiations with armed groups and a vocal critic of the current Malian government.

On 12 May 2025, the Malian Armed Forces and Dozo militia members were alleged to have arrested then executed 22 to 27 civilians in Diafarabé. According to survivor testimony, the incident began with soldiers entering a livestock market and arresting more than thirty people, but releasing those who were not Fulani. The arrested individuals were then blindfolded and tied up before taken across the river to a cemetery. At the cemetery, the soldiers and militiamen began to slit the throats of each of the civilians before tossing them into a mass grave. The civilians were allegedly targeted for being Fulani, and accused of having ties to militant groups. In response to the disappearance of the arrested, protests were held in the town, leading to the military to allow the families to see the victims, and launch a probe into the killings. The attack was condemned by multiple international agencies, including Amnesty International and the International Federation for Human Rights.

In June 2025, FLA's Alghabass sent an open letter to Turkish President Recep Tayyip Erdoğan, calling upon him to stop helping the Malian government and support the "oppressed Muslims".

=== JNIM escalates attacks ===
On 23 May 2025, an attack by JNIM militants occurred in Dioura, where they temporarily took control of the nearby military base. During the attack, 41 soldiers died.

On 1 June 2025, JNIM militants attacked and took control of a Malian army base in Boulkessi. Around 30 Malian soldiers died before they retreated.

On 2 June 2025, JNIM attacked an army camp and airport in Timbuktu. Residents reported hearing gunfire, and the airport was also shelled. An official estimated the death toll of around 40 soldiers.

On 3 June 2025, the Malian Armed Forces launched airstrikes on terrorist positions in Diafarabé, Mopti region and Niagassadou, Douentza region, claiming to have caused heavy losses and disrupting terrorist plans.

On 3 June 2025, JNIM attacked militiamen between the cities of Soumabougou and Saoura, killing at least 23 militiamen.

On 4 June 2025, terrorists, alleged to be ISGS, attacked an army camp in Tessit, Gao Region, causing significant damage and taking equipment, 40 Malian soldiers were killed in attack. The Malian Armed Forces claimed that over 40 terrorist casualties were left abandoned in the aftermath of the attack, including leader Mamoudou Akilou. Additionally, retaliatory airstrikes were being conducted in response to the raid.

On 5 June 2025, more than 50 JNIM militants attacked a military camp in Mahou, Sikasso region, killing at least 5 soldiers and injuring 10.

On 6 June 2025, the Wagner Group announced that it would end its mission in Mali. However, the Africa Corps, a paramilitary controlled by the Russian government, stated that they would remain in Mali.

On 9 June 2025, JNIM kidnapped 11 civilians from Diafarabé, including village chiefs and elected officials, claiming that it was in response for a massacre of Fulani civilians on May 12. Negotiations for the return of the hostages between Mali and JNIM began on the 12th

On 12 June 2025, the Malian Armed Forces claimed to have killed high-ranking JNIM katiba Attaye Ag Boulkhey, during a reconnaissance mission in Idjardahanen, Mopti Region.

On 13 June 2025, an SU-24 crash landed in the Niger River while returning from a mission as part of Operation Dougoukoloko, according to the Malian general staff. The two pilots survived, and were reported to be part of the Africa Corps. The Azawad Liberation Front claimed that they hit the plane with anti-air weaponry, causing it to retreat and eventually crash.

On 28 June 2025, the Malian Armed Forces partook in a joint operation with the Africa Corps and the Movement for the Salvation of Azawad about 38 km north of Ménaka. The raid killed six ISGS militants, including their foreign born leader, Abu Dahdah. Dahdah was alleged to have provided explosives in the an earlier attack in Niger.

On 1 July, JNIM launched a series of attacks on seven towns and positions across the Kayes Region including the capital, Kayes. The army reported that they successful countered the attacked and killed over 80 JNIM militants.

On 14 July, the FLA ambushed a FAMA and Africa Corps convoy on a road in between the cities of Kidal and Anefis. The Malian military sources claimed that they had successfully pushed back the terrorists, while the FLA claimed an indisputable victory against the Malian army and its Russian allies. Other sources report that JNIM was involved in the ambush. The army also lost a Mi-24 during the ambush.

On 19 August 2025, JNIM launched coordinated attacks in Farabougou and Biriki-Were. JNIM claimed 21 soldiers were killed and 15 vehicles were seized during the attacks. The military base in Farabogou was confirmed by the military as having been under control of the militants on August 23 as part of a strategic withdrawal.

On 5 September 2025, JNIM announced a blockade around the cities of Kayes and Nioro du Sahel Militants proceeded to set up checkpoints to extort "taxes" from drivers. Several people were also kidnapped during the blockade, as well as at least 40 fuel tankers being burned.

On 16 September 2025, JNIM claimed to have killed 16 soldiers and destroyed 8 vehicles during an ambush on a joint Malian and Africa Corps convoy between Markala and Siribala.

On 23 September 2025, two Emirati men and an Iranian man were kidnapped by JNIM. The men were taken from the private estate of Joumoua bin Maktoum al Maktoum, a retired general, in Sanankoroba, 40 km south of Bamako. The hostages were released on October 30 after the United Arab Emirates paid $50 million in weapons and cash.

On 27 October 2025, the government declared a shutdown of schools and universities as the fuel crisis in the country got worse due to the jihadist blockade. The US called its civilians to leave the country immediately, while the Lebanese Foreign Ministry, said it is keeping contact with its diaspora with the chargé d'affaires at Lebanon's embassy in Liberia.

On 8 November 2025, JNIM militants attacked the military base in Soumpi, killing 20, including the base commander. JNIM proceeded to loot the base before reinforcements arrived.

On 11 November 2025, JNIM attacked and overran Loulouni, temporarily taking control. At least ten Dozo militiamen were killed in the attack, and hundreds fled the town, which was recaptured by government forces three days later.

On 3 January 2026, jihadists attacked the Morila Gold Mine in the Sikasso Region, burning equipment and capturing seven hostages, though all hostages were released the following evening.

On 25 January 2026, JNIM ambushed FAMA and Africa Corps forces in Diabaly, capturing equipment and destroying a vehicle.

On 29 January 2026, JNIM attacked a fuel convoy traveling from the Senegalese border to Kayes, killing at least 15 and destroying a dozens of tanker trucks.

On 4 February 2026, JNIM militants attacked Dozo militiamen in Kendié, killing five and injuring four.

On 7 February 2026, the Malian Army announced three successful airstrikes, killing 35 JNIM militants nearby the Niger River in the Ségou region.

On 9 March 2026, JNIM ambushed Malian and Russian Africa Corps forces in a village near Nampala, killing 10 soldiers, including three Russians. The attack was reportedly in relation for an alleged execution on March 9 of seven civilians by Africa Corps near the border with Mauritania.

On 6 April 2026, JNIM kidnapped four Chinese nationals from a gold mine near Narena.

On 25 April 2026, FLA and JNIM carried out a major offensive with attacks directed at the Modibo Keïta International Airport, Kati, Gao, Bamako, and several locations in the country in a coordinated attack, according to the Malian army. Moreover, according to a spokesperson for the group, the FLA took control of Kidal and shot down a helicopter near Gao. Malian minister of Defence, General Sadio Camara, was assassinated by JNIM militants in a suicide bombing in Kati.

On 1 May 2026, the FLA and JNIM took control of the Amachach base outside of Tessalit in the Kidal Region, near the Algerian border, after Malian and Russian troops withdrew southward.

On 1 June 2026, a bus travelling the Bamako-Kayes highway was hit by a landmine placed by JNIM militants, killing 8 and injuring 42.

On 23 June 2026, local negotiations ended the JNIM blockade around Mourdiah and Nara that had been in place over the past two years.

On 19 July 2026, at least 50 Malian soldiers were killed by Tuareg insurgents in attack on an army convoy leaving the strategic northern town of Anéfis.

According to Mali's statement, on 31 July, Malian armies carried out shelling attacks on the village of Megou and Dogo against several JNIM militants.

On 3 August 2026, Malian authorities arrested 20 Mauritanians in Kati, accusing them of attempting to join JNIM. Relatives of the arrested claimed that they were returning from Bouaké when their bus broke down.

On 29 August, Tuareg rebels have freed about 60 Malian soldiers in exchange for one of their own leaders, a former Malian army officer turned defector Inkinane Ag Attaher.

On September 7, a patrol of Russian fighters and Dozo hunters from Dan Na Ambassagou was ambushed near Kaka, Sofara. On 10 September, JNIM fighters attacked the Malian Armed Forces camp at Dioura. At least 100 soldiers were killed, including 5 Russians. Dozens of soldiers were captured. Malian army used air power to counterattack, but as of September 14, camp remained under the control of militants.

In mid-September, JNIM targeted Konna and the Sévaré airport area, where elements of Africa Corps are stationed. The group claims to have destroyed Bayraktar TB2 and Akinci drones there, but that claim has not been verified.

On 6 October 2026, the FLA announced that it had “decided to carry out a strategic and controlled withdrawal of its forces" from the city of Kidal. The Malian forces along with Africa corps entered the city soon after.

At least 48 tuareg civilians were killed on 18 October, when Islamic State in the Sahel Province (ISSP) militants attacked the Idaksahak pastoralist community in Tagadayat, about 40 km south of Ménaka in northeastern Mali.

== Weaponry and warfare ==
=== Drones ===
Between December 2022 and December 2024, Mali integrated 17 Bayraktar TB2 drones and at least two Baykar Bayraktar Akıncı drones into its arsenal, becoming one of the largest African operators of Turkish drones. The TB2s demonstrated their effectiveness during the November 2023 capture of Kidal from the CSP, where drone strikes disrupted CSP defensives and forced fighters to abandon their positions without engaging in sustained ground combat. Mali has been increasingly relying on drones to compensate for its limited manpower and resources.

According to Al Jazeera, there were reports that Ukrainians taught the FLA how to operate drones.

=== Starlink ===
According to the Global Initiative Against Transnational Organized Crime, jihadist groups such as JMIN and ISSP have been using an illicit supply chain to acquire Starlink devices and bypass regulations on their use. The more secure communication of these devices has made it harder for government forces to intercept the plans of armed groups, allowing them to evade law enforcement and sustain illicit economies. A leader of the Union of Nigeriens for Vigilance and Patriotism, a support group for the Nigerien junta in the Agadez region, noted:

These days, every suspicious vehicle seems to carry one of these Starlink devices. The armed groups near Emi Lulu, the militias Haftar pushed out who are now hiding along the Niger border — they all rely on these devices to stay connected and coordinate their movements.

— February 2025

In response, the governments of Niger and Chad have moved to legalize Starlink in hopes of better regulating the technology by requiring registration of the devices. However, these measures are unlikely to stop the supply chain.

Starlink has also been adopted by the FLA and the armed forces of Mali. According to an FLA leader in the Tinzaouaten area, the group uses Starlink to coordinate operations, share intelligence, and communicate its narrative. In the Battle of Tinzaouaten (2024), the use of Starlink allowed the FLA to maintain secure communication across its dispersed units and release updates on social media, increasing its visibility to external audiences.

== Casualties ==
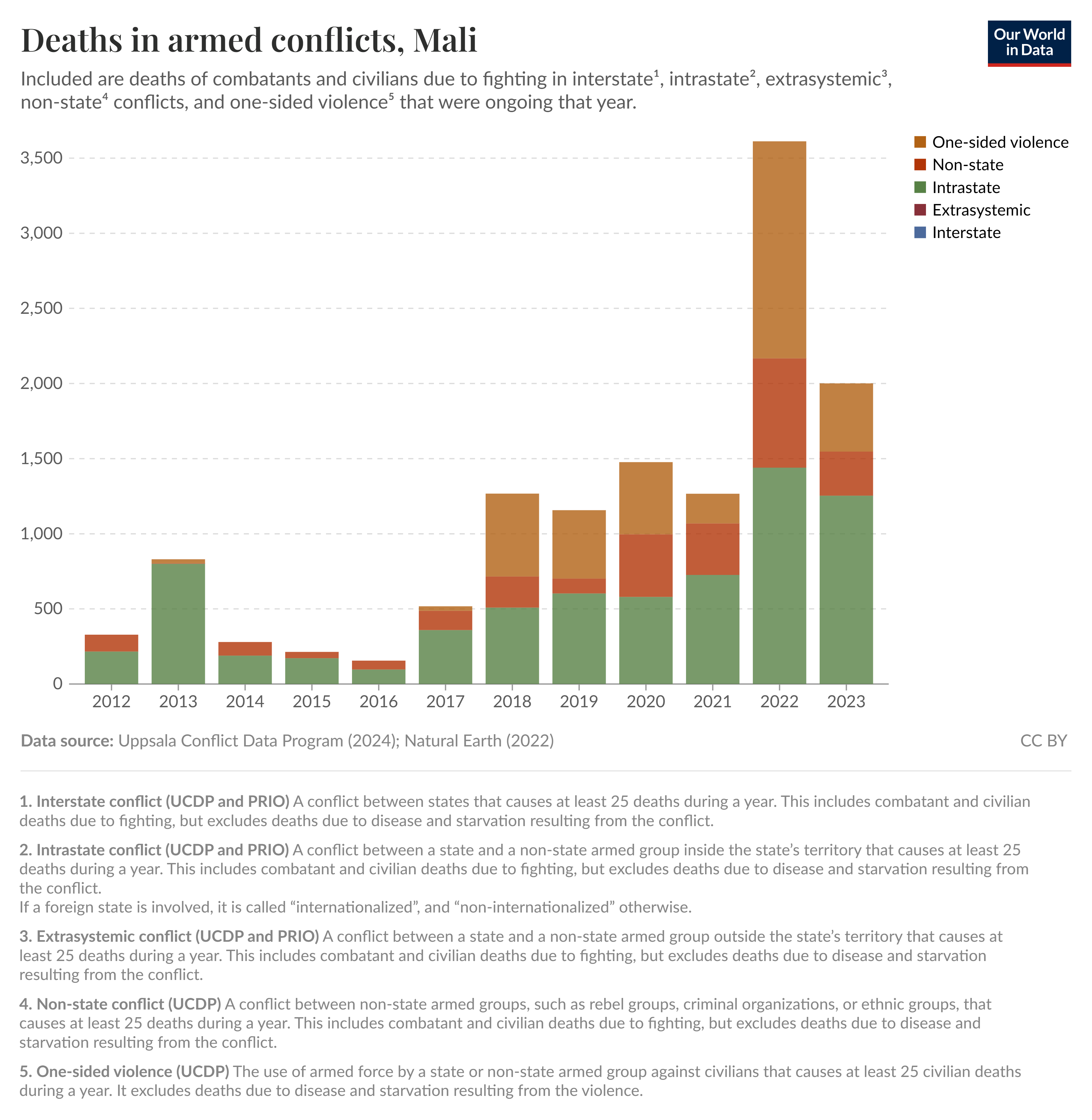
Civilian and combatant deaths in Mali from 2012 to 2023

In total, from 2012 to 2023, 13,105 civilians and combatants were killed in armed conflict.

=== Malian army ===
After two months of fighting durning Tuareg rebellion in 2012, the Malian army has lost control of most of Azawad, while the number of troops that have either been killed, taken captive or deserted is now thought to be at least 1,000.

In 2022 casualties reached pretty high level compared to 2013-2022 recorded by ACLED. The number of reported deaths from political violence increased by 150% in Mali from 2021.

In August 2023, relations between the Malian junta and CSP deteriorated, effectively leading to the collapse of the Algiers Agreements. Throughout September and October, the CSP carried out a series of raids on military bases, resulting in the deaths of hundreds of Malian soldiers.

=== Russia ===
As May 2026, 127 killed soldiers of Wagner were indetified by names. Majority of them died in battle of Tinzaouaten. One of the Russian source linked to Wagner have confirmed the death of more than 80 soldiers.. Research group All Eyes on Wagner confirmed the deaths of 45 Russian and Malian soldiers durning the battle on Anoumalane on 13 June 2025 and destruction of 7–21 vehicles by FLA.

According to ACLED data cited by RFI, more than 200 Russian fighters were killed in Mali between July 2024 and August 2026.

On November 1, 2026, the hacker groups Cyberpartisans BY and Silent Crow announced that they had hacked Rosstat (which denies this leak) and passed on the obtained data on the losses of the Russian army to journalists from several independent publications.

According to data obtained from Rosstat, more than 300 Russian soldiers have died in battle in Mali since the beginning of their intervention.

=== International forces ===
In the entire mission, the MINUSMA lost 311 peacekeepers. EUTM Mali lost only two.

During the French soldiers' participation in the war in Mali, they lost 58 killed.

=== Jihadists ===
According to Mediapart in February 2022, the number of Jihadists killed by French forces since 2013 was at least 2,800.

According to estimate published by ACLED, about 2,200 fighters from Jama'at Nasr al-Islam wal Muslimin (JNIM), al-Qaeda's branch in the Sahel, and the Islamic State's branch in the region, have been killed in some 320 armed clashes between the two largest terrorist groups in the Sahel from mid-2019 to September 2026.

=== Displaced ===
As of 2020, 600,000 have been displaced by this conflict.

== Human rights concerns ==
Following several reports of abuse from both sides, the prosecutor of the International Criminal Court opened a case investigating war crimes in Mali on 16 January 2013. This case is the quickest any ICC investigation has begun after foreign military intervention.

=== Claims against separatists and Islamists ===
In May 2012, Amnesty International released a report stating that the conflict had created Mali's worst human rights situation since 1960. The organization stated that fighters with the MNLA and Ansar Dine were "running riot" in Mali's north, and documented instances of gang rape, extrajudicial executions, and the use of child soldiers by both Tuareg and Islamist groups.

On 3 April 2012, armed groups looted 2,354 tons of food from United Nations' World Food Programme's warehouses in Kidal, Gao and Timbuktu, causing the WFP to suspend its food distribution operations in northern Mali. Other targets of looting included hospitals, hotels, government offices, Oxfam offices and the offices and warehouses of other unnamed aid groups. The WFP also stated that 200,000 had so far fled the fighting, predicting that the number would rise.

=== Claims against Islamists ===
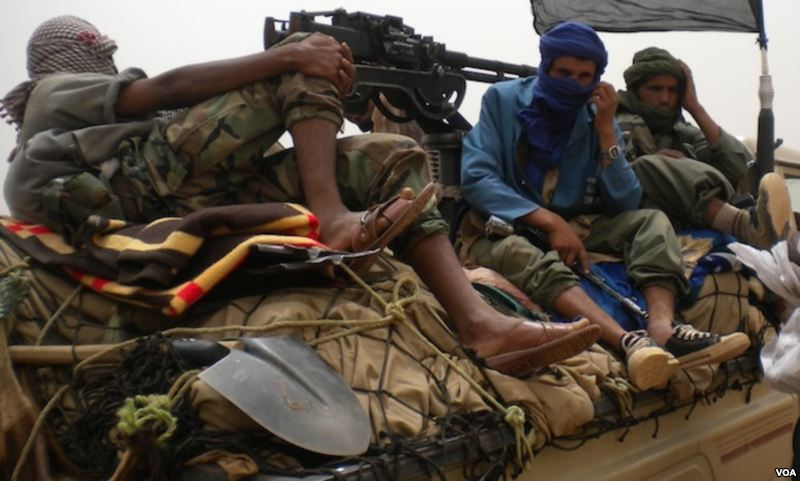
Rebels from Ansar Dine

Ansar el Dine also blocked a humanitarian convoy bringing medical and food aid from reaching Timbuktu on 15 May, objecting to the presence of women in the welcoming committee set up by city residents; after negotiations, the convoy was released on the following day. The group reportedly banned video games, Malian and Western music, bars, and football in Gao and ransacked alcohol-serving establishments in both Gao and Kidal.

Islamist forces were also reported to have intervened against looters and ordered women to wear head scarves. The CNRDR's spokesman Amadou Konare claimed that "women and girls have been kidnapped and raped by the new occupants who are laying down their own law." The anti-slavery organization Temedt claims that ex-slaves were the first targeted for punishment by Islamist forces and that former masters have used the violence to recapture ex-slaves.

On 29 July 2012, a couple was stoned to death by Islamists in Aguelhok for having children outside of marriage. An official reported that many people left the town for Algeria following the incident. On 9 August, Islamist militants chopped off the hand of an alleged thief in the town of Ansongo, despite a crowd pleading with the militants for mercy.

In November 2025, it was reported that Mariam Cissé, a TikTok influencer who posted videos supporting Mali's military, was abducted in the Timbuktu region and subsequently executed by the Jama’at Nusrat al-Islam wal-Muslimin (JNIM).

==== Destruction of ancient monuments in Timbuktu ====
During the conflict, Islamists also damaged or destroyed a number of historical sites on the grounds that they said were idolatrous, particularly in Timbuktu, a UNESCO World Heritage Site. On 4 May 2012, Ansar Dine members reportedly burned the tomb of a Sufi saint. In late June, Islamists attacked several more sites in Timbuktu with pickaxes and shovels.

On 28 January 2013, as French-led Malian troops captured the airport of the World Heritage town of Timbuktu. The Ahmed Baba Institute, host of priceless ancient manuscripts, was razed by fleeing Islamists.

=== Claims against the Malian Army and loyalists ===
The Tuaregs and Arabs who lived in Bamako and elsewhere in southern Mali were subjects of a rash of ethnic attacks by black Malians, despite many of them being hostile to Azawad separatism as well as the Islamists. In fact, a large part of them actually had only recently arrived to the government-held south, fleeing the violence in the north.

An incident arose on 8 September 2012 when a group of Malian soldiers detained 17 unarmed Tablighi preachers from Mauritania in Dogofry, north-east of Diabaly, while en route to a religious conference in Bamako and executed all but one of them without reporting to their own command. The Malian government expressed its condolences for the event, which Associated Press considered a symptom of the disintegration of discipline and command in the Malian Army as a result of the 21 March Coup.

On 19 January 2013, Human Rights Watch report killings and other human rights abuses committed by the Malian army in the central Malian town of Niono. Tuaregs and Arabs were especially targeted.

On 23 January 2013, BBC reported claims by the International Federation of Human Rights that Malian Army soldiers had carried out summary executions against people suspected of being militant, and with bodies subsequently being hastily buried in makeshift graves and wells. Some victims were reportedly killed for not having identity documents or for their ethnicity. Reportedly, dozens of ethnic Tuaregs living in Bamako had their homes raided by government troops.

In 2025, Azawadian source's claimed that approximately 2,000 tuareg and arab civillians were killed or executed by russian and malian army.

According to ACLED, 731 civilians were killed as a result of Malian and Russian drone strikes on rebel territory from September 2023 to September 2026.

On June 15, Russian aircraft carried out airstrikes on the village of Kirni. According to the Africa Corps several terrorist commanders were killed in the attack. However, Human Rights Watch refuted this. 8 civilians, including three children, were killed in the attack.

On 23 June 2026, Africa Corps troops were reported to have killed four civilians near Zahro and Abakoira, dismembering one of the bodies and arranging it in the shape of a swastika.

On 3 September 2026, Former Malian army colonel Alpha Yaya was sentenced to 20 years in prison for writing in his book about war crimes committed by the Malian army against civilians.

== In popular culture ==
Mali earned the first win in the 2013 Africa Cup of Nations football championship on 20 January 2013 with a 1–0 win over Niger. After scoring the only goal, Seydou Keita displayed a T-shirt with a peace sign on it.

A number of musicians from Mali came together to record the song Mali-ko (meaning peace) and release a video titled Voices United for Mali-'Mali-ko' in early 2013 about the ongoing conflict in the country. The collaboration includes many well-known Malian musicians, including Oumou Sangaré, Vieux Farka Touré, and Amadou & Mariam.

The 2014 film Timbuktu centers on the brief occupation of Timbuktu by Ansar Dine and was selected to compete for the Palme d'Or in the main competition section at the 2014 Cannes Film Festival, where it won the Prize of the Ecumenical Jury and the François Chalais Prize.

== See also ==
- Yemeni civil war (2014–present)
- Sudanese civil war (2023–present)

== Bibliography ==
- Comolli, Virginia (2015). Boko Haram: Nigeria's Islamist Insurgency. London: Oxford University Press.
