= United Nations Security Council Resolution 2085 =

UN Security Council Resolution 2085
- Date: 20 December 2012
- Meeting no.: 6898
- Code: S/RES/2085(2012) (Document)
- Subject: The situation in Mali
- Voting summary: 15 voted for; None voted against; None abstained
- Result: Adopted

Security Council composition
- Permanent members: China; France; Russia; United Kingdom; United States
- Non-permanent members: Azerbaijan; Colombia; Germany; Guatemala; India; Morocco; Pakistan; Portugal; South Africa; Togo

United Nations Security Council Resolution 2085, adopted unanimously on 20 December 2012, authorized the deployment of the African-led International Support Mission to Mali (AFISMA). The resolution recalled previous resolutions regarding the Northern Mali conflict, including resolutions 2056 and 2071 in authorizing action. According to Ban Ki-moon, the resolution "aimed at the full restoration of Mali’s constitutional order and territorial integrity."

== Background ==
With the ongoing conflict between the military of Mali and the insurgent groups through 2012 and the continuing problems with democracy and human rights, the transitional government sent two letters (on 18 September 2012 and 12 October 2012) to the United Nations requesting the authorization of an international force. The United Nations Security Council affirmed Resolution 2071 on 12 October 2012 which called for military intervention in Mali be considered and a plan to be developed by the Economic Community of West African States (ECOWAS) and the African Union (AU).

Following this, on 11 November 2012, ECOWAS released a statement following a high-level meeting that they considered intervention to be necessary in resolving the Mali conflict and authorized a ground force.

== International reception ==
The Economic Community of West African States (ECOWAS) made a statement immediately after Resolution 2085 was passed which showed significant support for the Resolution. The statement read: "ECOWAS expresses sincere gratitude to the members of the Security Council for taking this important decision. It applauds the determination and unity of purpose demonstrated by ECOWAS Member States, the neighboring countries, the African Union, the United Nations, and other partners, in particular the EU, France, and the US, since the outbreak of the security and institutional crises in Mali, and which have culminated in the unanimous adoption of the landmark resolution."

Al-Qaeda in the Islamic Maghreb (AQIM) and Movement for Oneness and Jihad in West Africa (MOJWA) jointly condemned the Resolution at a meeting a few days after the Resolution was approved.

The Malian Foreign Minister Tieman Coulibaly said, as claimed in an Algerian news report, that the Algerian ambassador to the United Nations was the first to congratulate him on the passage of Resolution 2085.

== See also ==
- Northern Mali conflict (2012–present)
- List of United Nations Security Council Resolutions 2001 to 2100 (2011 – present)
