= Alghabass Ag Intalla =

Tuareg politician and military commander (born 1971)

Amghar Alghabass Ag Intalla
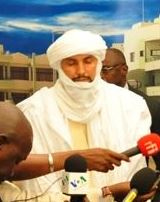
- Intalla in November 2012

Representative of Kidal in the National Assembly
- In office 2002–2012

Secretary-general of the High Council for the Unity of Azawad
- In office July 2014 – 30 November 2024

Secretary-general of the Islamic Movement of Azawad
- In office January 2013 – May 19, 2013

Personal details
- Born: 1971 (age 54–55) Kidal, Mali

Military service
- Allegiance: MNLA (2012); Ansar Dine (2012–2013); Islamic Movement of Azawad (2013); HCUA (2013–2024); CMA (2016–2024); Azawad Liberation Front (2024–present)

Alghabass Ag Intalla (born 1971) is a Malian Tuareg politician and military commander who is serving as the leader of the Azawad Liberation Front (FLA) since 2024. He also served as the secretary-general of the Coordination of Azawad Movements and was a senior leader in the High Council for the Unity of Azawad.

Born in Kidal into a family belonging to the Kel Adagh clan of Tuaregs, he became involved in national politics during his teenage years. He served as the representative of Kidal in the National Assembly from 2002 until 2012 when the Mali War broke out. Intalla initially joined National Movement for the Liberation of Azawad (MNLA) to fight the Malian Army, though quickly switched allegiances to Ansar Dine. He rose to becoming the second-in-command of Ansar Dine within months, representing the movement in Burkina Faso in 2012. Ideologically a moderate Islamist and Azawadian nationalist, Intalla broke up with Ansar Dine in early 2013 and founded the Islamic Movement of Azawad (MIA), of which he was the secretary-general. Few months later, he merged his militant faction into the High Council for the Unity of Azawad, led by his older brother Mohamed.

Intalla maintains a popular image among Tuaregs. He is also known to have close ties with the Qatari royal family, for whom he has arranged hunting trips in the Sahara.

== Early life and family ==
Alghabbas Ag Intalla was born in 1971 in Kidal to a noble Kel Adagh Tuareg family. His father, Intalla Ag Attaher, was the Amenokal (tribal chief) of Kidal since 1963, but due to ailing health, transferred most of his powers to Alghabbas. He has two older brothers; Mohamed and Attayoub. Mohamed succeeded his father as the Amenokal (tribal chief) of the Kidal region.

== Political career ==
Alghabass was a deputy in Mali's National Assembly serving as the representative of Kidal from 2002 to 2012. Alghabass's initial political popularity that won him elections in 2002 shrank in 2007 and 2012.

When the rebellion began, he joined the National Movement for the Liberation of Azawad (MNLA) but quickly switched to Ansar Dine. In Ansar Dine, he claimed to fight to establish Sharia law in northern Mali. Alghabass quickly became the face of Ansar Dine in political negotiations as the group's second-in-command, and represented the movement in negotiations in Ouagadougou, Burkina Faso in late 2012. In January 2013, just days before the French intervention of Operation Serval, Alghabass left Ansar Dine and founded the Islamic Movement of Azawad (MIA), of which he was the Secretary-general. He announced the dissolution of the MIA in May 2013, joining the High Council for the Unity of Azawad founded by his brother Mohamed instead.

Alghabass became the HCUA's Secretary-general in July 2014, representing the group along with the Arab Movement of Azawad and the MNLA in negotiations in Algiers in 2014. Following his father Intalla's death in December 2014, Alghabass was expected to succeed him as Amenokal of the Ifoghas. This position was instead granted to Mohamed, who was preferred by Intalla before his death. Ifoghas leaders appointed Mohamed for the role because of this, and despite Alghabass' charisma and activity within the Ifoghas community, his past in Ansar Dine could've swayed the decision by the leaders toward Mohamed.

On 16 December 2016, and in July 2022, Alghabass succeeded Bilal Ag Acherif as president of the Coordination of Azawad Movements (CMA). Acherif and Alghabass took turns in the role for the next few months. In 2018, it was speculated that Alghabass still was in contact with jihadist leader and former Ansar Dine compatriot Iyad Ag Ghali. In December 2019, Alghabass called for the different groups within the CMA to merge into one.

In early 2023, tensions between Alghabass and Malian junta leader Assimi Goïta rose over the implementation of the Algiers Accords. Under Alghabass' command, the CMA's groups merged into one entity, left the Algiers Accords, and launched an operation to combat the Islamic State – Sahil Province (ISGS) in northern Mali. A major reason for tension with the Malian junta was the junta's alliance with the Russian Wagner Group, known for its killings of civilians in Mali. Alghabass stepped down from the presidency of the CMA in 2023, which was then led instead by Ibrahim Ould Handa.

Under Alghabass's administration of the Kidal region, the CMA was effectively a structured government operating under Islamic law with Islamic courts. Alghabass was the one that signed a CMA statement implementing the qadis, or Islamic judges, which sparked controversy by critics claiming that the CMA and qadis were interconnected, which the CMA decried.

In November 2024, Intalla merged his group into the Azawad Liberation Front (FLA), of which he became the military leader.

In June 2025, Alghabass sent an open letter to Turkish President Recep Tayyip Erdoğan, calling upon him to stop helping the Malian government and support the "oppressed Muslims".

== Interviews and external links ==
- Interview with Alghabass Ag Intalla, head of the Islamic Movement of Azawad - February 1, 2013
- Ten things to know about Alghabass Ag Intalla - August 17, 2022
