= Coordination of Azawad Movements =

Mali resistance coalition

- ⵜⴰⵙⵈ ⵏ ⵜⵏⴰⴾⵔⵢⵓⵏ ⵜⵢⵏ ⴰⵣⴰⵓⴰⴷ تنسيقية الحركات الأزوادية; Coordination des mouvements de l'Azawad
- Leaders: Bilal Ag Acherif; Alghabass Ag Intalla; Mohamed Ag Najem; Sidi Brahim Ould Sidati X Ibrahim Ould Handa
- Dates active: 28 October 2014 – November 2024
- Headquarters: Kidal (until 2023)
- Active regions: Azawad/northern Mali
- Ideology: Nationalism; Azawad Autonomy; Berberism

The Coordination of Azawad Movements (French: Coordination des mouvements de l'Azawad (CMA); Tamasheq: ⵜⴰⵙⵈ ⵏ ⵜⵏⴰⴾⵔⵢⵓⵏ ⵜⵢⵏ ⴰⵣⴰⵓⴰⴷ; Arabic: تنسيقية الحركات الأزوادية) was a large coalition of Tuareg independentist nationalist groups that formed in Mali during the Northern Mali conflict in 2014. The CMA merged into the Azawad Liberation Front (ALF) in 2024.

== Organization ==
The CMA was founded on 28 October 2014 as an alliance of three separate rebel groups: The National Movement for the Liberation of Azawad (MNLA), The High Council for the Unity of Azawad (HCUA), and a faction of the Arab Movement of Azawad (MAA) that is active in or around the Timbuktu Region.

Other rebel groups claim to belong to the CMA, including The Coordination of Patriotic Resistance Movements and Forces (CMFPR), the Coalition of the People of Azawad (CPA), and the Movement for the Salvation of Azawad (MSA), but are not recognized by its founding members.

The CMA and the MNLA, the largest member of the coalition, are largely secular organisations. Their goal is to achieve independence or a greater deal of autonomy for the region of Azawad. Multiple Saharan ethnic groups, including Tuareg people, Fulani and Songhai, are represented within the CMA. CMA has been described as an umbrella organization that features multiple distinct ideologies.

On February 2023, 3 main rebel groups of CMA, have announced their merger into new rebel coalition, Azawad Liberation Front, in the city of Kidal.

The CMA is chaired by Ibrahim Ould Handa as of 2023. Sidi Brahim Ould Sidati, president of the CMA from 2017 to 2018, was assassinated in Bamako on April 13, 2021.

The CMA formed the Permanent Strategic Framework for Peace, Security, and Development (CSP-PSD) coalition with Platform in 2021. Platform withdrew from the CSP-PSD in 2024.

On the 9 February 2023 it was reported that the National Movement for the Liberation of Azawad, the Arab Movement of Azawad and the High Council for the Unity of Azawad merged into one group.

== See also ==
- Azawad
- Tuareg rebellions
- Mali War
- Ouagadagou Declaration
