= Ansar Dine =

Militant Islamist organization in Mali

- Dates active: 2012–2017
- Group: Katiba Macina
- Active regions: Mali; Senegal; Mauritania
- Ideology: Sunni Islamism; Jihadism

Ansar Dine (Arabic: أنصار الدين ʾAnṣār ad-Dīn, also transliterated Ançar Deen), meaning "helpers of the religion" (Islam) (Defenders of the Faith) and also known as Ansar al-Din (abbreviated as AAD), was a Sunni Islamist militant group led by Iyad Ag Ghaly. Ansar Dine sought to impose absolute sharia across Mali. The group took over the city of Timbuktu in 2012, which prompted the French-led intervention, Operation Serval.

The organization is not to be confused with the Sufi movement Ançar Dine, founded in Southern Mali in the 1990s by Chérif Ousmane Madani Haïdara, which is fundamentally opposed to militant Islamism.

Ansar Dine was active from March 2012 until March 2017, when it merged with other militant Islamist groups to form Jama'at Nasr al-Islam wal Muslimin.

== Organization ==
=== Membership ===
Ansar Dine had its main base among the Ifora tribe from the southern part of the Tuaregs' homeland. It had been linked with Al-Qaeda Organization in the Islamic Maghreb (AQIM) because its leader Iyad Ag Ghaly is the cousin of AQIM commander Hamada Ag Hama. In April 2012, Salma Belaala, a professor at Warwick University who does research on jihadism in North Africa said that this association was false, claiming that Ansar Dine was opposed to Al Qaeda. Ag Ghaly was also previously associated with the 1990 Tuareg rebellion. The group's members were reported to come from Mali, Algeria, and Nigeria. Omar Ould Hamaha, who served as Ansar Dine's spokesman after April 2012, became the military leader of the AQIM-affiliated Movement for Oneness and Jihad in West Africa (MOJWA) in August 2012.

On 24 January 2013, a faction which called itself the Islamic Movement for the Azawad split from Ansar Dine. As of January 2013, this group was led by the prominent Tuareg leader Alghabass Ag Intalla.

In March 2013, it was designated as a Foreign Terrorist Organization by the U.S. Department of State, and similarly classed as a terrorist organization by the United Nations Security Council. and Iraq in 2019.

=== Command structure ===
In Mopti, the Ansar Dine fighters obtained access to heavy construction equipment from fleeing construction workers and used it to build fighting positions. The fighting positions included an elaborate tunnel network and vehicular obstacles such as trenches.

=== Weapons ===
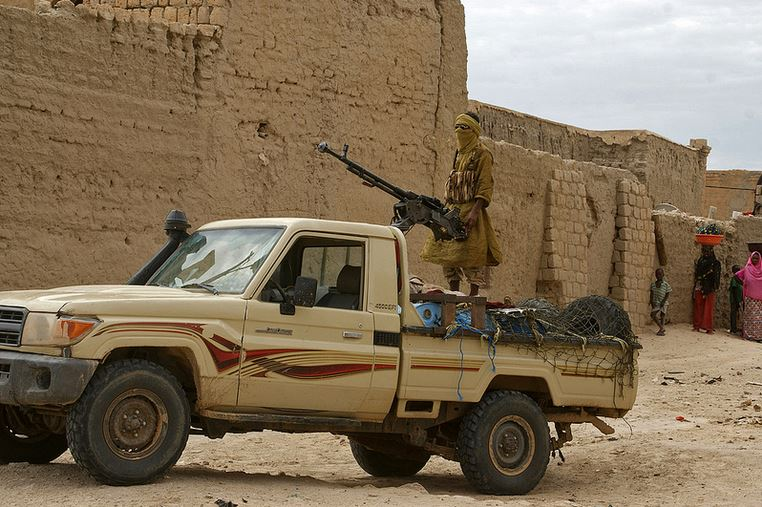
Ansar Dine jihadi technical in Timbuktu in 2012.

Ansar Dine had reportedly put together at least one convoy of 100 vehicles carrying soldiers equipped with small arms. There had also been rumors that fighters may have been able to obtain weapons from Libya's weapons depots after the fall of Muammar Gaddafi. The Ansar Dine arsenal also included anti aircraft weapons which can be mounted on pickup trucks.

== Ideology ==
The group sought to impose sharia law across Mali, including the Azawad region. Witnesses had said that Ansar Dine fighters wore long beards and flew black flags with the shahada (Islamic creed) emblazoned in white. According to different reports, unlike the National Movement for the Liberation of Azawad (MNLA), Ansar Dine did not seek independence but rather to keep Mali intact and convert it into a rigid theocracy.

== Participation in 2012 northern Mali conflict ==
=== March 2012 ===
On 21 March 2012, the group claimed control of Mali's vast northeast regions. The Agence France-Presse reported that Ansar Dine claimed to occupy the towns of Tinzaouaten, Tessalit, and Aguelhok, all close to the Algerian border, and that they had captured at least 110 civilian and military prisoners. France accused the group of summarily executing 82 soldiers and civilians in capturing Aguelhok, describing the group's tactics as "Al-Qaeda-style".

On 22 March, mutineering Malian soldiers unhappy with Amadou Toumani Touré overthrew the Malian government in a coup d'état. Taking advantage of Malian disarray, Ansar Dine and MNLA proceeded to take the towns of Kidal, Gao, and Timbuktu within the following ten days. According to Jeremy Keenan of the School of Oriental and African Studies, Ansar Dine's military contribution was slight compared to the much larger MNLA: "What seems to happen is that when they move into a town, the MNLA take out the military base—not that there's much resistance—and Iyad [Ag Aghaly] goes into town and puts up his flag and starts bossing everyone around about sharia law".

=== April 2012 ===
On 3 April, the BBC reported that the group had started implementing Sharia law in Timbuktu. That day, Ag Ghaly gave a radio interview in Timbuktu announcing that Sharia would be enforced in the city, including the veiling of women, the stoning of adulterers, and the punitive mutilation of thieves. According to Timbuktu's mayor, the announcement caused nearly all of Timbuktu's Christian population to flee the city. On 6 April, the MNLA issued a declaration of independence. However, the military wing of Ansar Dine rejected it hours after it was issued.

=== May 2012 ===
According to CNN, Ansar Dine was responsible for the burning of the tomb of the Sufi saint Sidi Mahmoud Ben Amar, a World Heritage Site, on 4 May in Timbuktu. The group also blocked a humanitarian convoy bringing medical and food aid from reaching Timbuktu on 15 May, objecting to the presence of women in the welcoming committee set up by city residents; after negotiations, the convoy was released on the following day. In Gao, the group reportedly banned video games, Malian and Western music, bars, and football.

On 26 May, the MNLA and Ansar Dine announced a pact in which they would merge to form an Islamist state called the "Islamic Republic of Azawad".

=== June 2012 ===
However, some later reports indicated that the MNLA had decided to withdraw from the pact, distancing itself from Ansar Dine. MNLA and Ansar Dine continued to clash, culminating in the Battle of Gao on 27 June, in which Movement for Oneness and Jihad in West Africa and Ansar Dine took control of the city, driving out the MNLA. The following day, Ansar Dine announced that it was in control of all the cities of northern Mali.

=== July 2012 ===
In the summer of 2012, members of Ansar Dine broke down the doors of the Sidi Yahya Mosque, which, according to legend, were not to be opened until the Last Days. They claimed that reverence for the site was idolatrous, but offered roughly $100 U.S. dollars to repair the mosque.

=== November 2012 ===
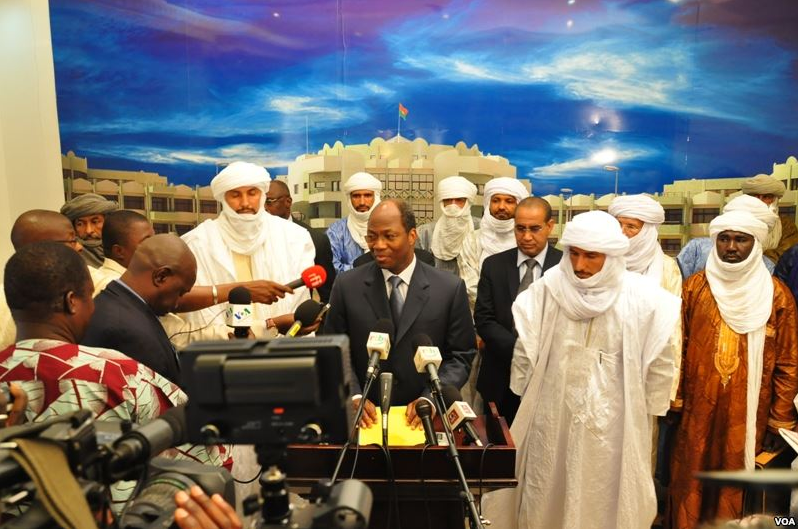
Ansar Dine and MNLA in Ouagadougou, with Blaise Compaoré, 16 November 2012

Ansar Dine was in peace talks with Mali's neighbours Burkina Faso and Algeria.

=== January 2013 ===
In late January 2013, during the French Operation Serval against the Islamist fighters in Northern Mali, a faction split off from Ansar Dine, led by Alghabass Ag Intalla(h). It called itself the Islamic Movement of Azawad (MIA) and claimed to be ready for negotiations and to reject extremism and terrorism as well as any association with Al-Qaeda in the Islamic Maghreb.

=== March 2017 ===
In March 2017, Iyad Ag Ghaly appeared in a video alongside leaders from the Saharan branch of Al-Qaeda in the Islamic Maghreb, Al-Mourabitoun and the Macina Liberation Front, in which it was announced their groups were merging under Ag Ghaly's leadership, in an organisation called Jama'at Nasr al-Islam wal Muslimin.

== Territory of Ansar Dine ==
Ansar Dine أنصار الدين ʾAnṣār ad-Dīn (Note: also transliterated Ançar Deen)
- 2012–2017
- Flag of Ansar Dine

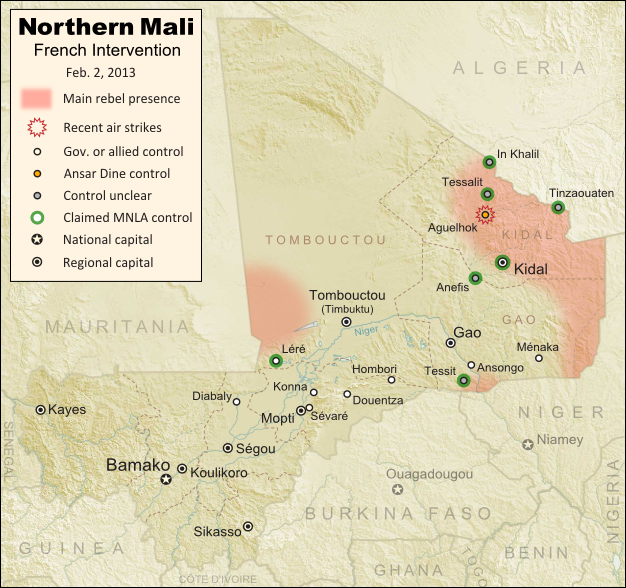
- Areas held by Ansar Dine in January 2013 (red) and areas held in February 2013 (orange)
- Status: Territory controlled by a terrorist group
- Capital: Unknown
- Emir of Ansar Dine
  - 2012–2017: Iyad Ag Ghaly
- Chief of Staff and Spokesman of Ansar Dine
  - 2012–2014: Omar Ould Hamaha
- Leader of Katiba Macina
  - 2015–2017: Amadou Koufa
- Establishment: Sahel War (Mali War)
- History
  - Established: 21 March 2012
  - Replaced by the Territory of Jama'at Nusrat al-Islam wal-Muslimin: 2 March 2017
Preceded by	Succeeded by
Republic of Mali	Territory of Jama'at Nusrat al-Islam wal-Muslimin
- Today part of: Territory of Jama'at Nusrat al-Islam wal-Muslimin

=== Territorial history ===
On 21 March 2012, the group claimed control of Mali's vast northeast regions. The Agence France-Presse reported that Ansar Dine claimed to occupy the towns of Tinzaouaten, Tessalit, and Aguelhok, all close to the Algerian border, and that they had captured at least 110 civilian and military prisoners. France accused the group of summarily executing 82 soldiers and civilians in capturing Aguelhok, describing the group's tactics as "Al-Qaeda-style". One day later Ansar Dine and MNLA proceeded to take the towns of Kidal, Gao, and Timbuktu within the following ten days. According to Jeremy Keenan of the School of Oriental and African Studies, Ansar Dine's military contribution was slight compared to the much larger MNLA: "What seems to happen is that when they move into a town, the MNLA take out the military base—not that there's much resistance—and Iyad [Ag Aghaly] goes into town and puts up his flag and starts bossing everyone around about sharia law". On 3 April 2012, the BBC reported that the group had started implementing Sharia law in Timbuktu. That day, Ag Ghaly gave a radio interview in Timbuktu announcing that Sharia would be enforced in the city, including the veiling of women, the stoning of adulterers, and the punitive mutilation of thieves. According to Timbuktu's mayor, the announcement caused nearly all of Timbuktu's Christian population to flee the city. One day later, the MNLA issued a declaration of independence. However, Ansar Dine's military wing rejected it hours after it was issued. On 26 May 2012, the MNLA and Ansar Dine announced a pact in which they would merge to form an Islamist state called the "Islamic Republic of Azawad". However, later in June 2012 reports indicated that the MNLA had decided to withdraw from the pact, distancing itself from Ansar Dine. MNLA and Ansar Dine continued to clash, culminating in the Battle of Gao on 27 June, in which Movement for Oneness and Jihad in West Africa and Ansar Dine took control of the city, driving out the MNLA. The next day, Ansar Dine announced it controlled all the cities of northern Mali. From 10 January until 18 January 2013, Ansar Dine held Konna. Ansar Dine controlled Aguelhok for a short time between March 2012 and June 2012 and again in February 2013. Tessalit was in early 2013 under control of Ansar Dine.

=== Governance of the territory ===
Ansar Dine implented Sharia law in the areas under their control.

== See also ==
- Movement for Oneness and Jihad in West Africa
- Al-Mulathameen
- Al-Mourabitoun (militant group)
