= Islamic Movement of Azawad =

2013 rebel group

- Leaders: Alghabass Ag Intalla; Mohamed Ag Arib
- Founded: January 2013
- Dates active: January 2013 - May 19, 2013
- Dissolved: May 19, 2013
- Split from: Ansar Dine
- Merged into: High Council for the Unity of Azawad
- Country: Mali
- Ideology: Azawadian autonomy, Islamism
- Wars: Mali War

The Islamic Movement of Azawad (MIA) was a short-lived rebel group advocating for Azawadian autonomy under Islamic law. The group was founded by Alghabass Ag Intalla, and emerged after a split from Ansar Dine following French intervention in northern Mali. The MIA was founded in January 2013, and merged into the High Council for the Unity of Azawad (HCUA) on May 19, 2013.

== History ==
The Islamic Movement of Azawad emerged in January 2013 following statements by Alghabass Ag Intalla, a former diplomat within Ansar Dine who represented the group at peace talks in Ouagadougou. Ag Intalla also announced that Mohamed Ag Arib, Ansar Dine's former spokesperson, joined the MIA. The MIA's self-declared goal was a peaceful solution to the Mali War, and called on France and Mali to cease action in Kidal and Ménaka, which were under control of the National Movement for the Liberation of Azawad (MNLA). The MIA notably omitted the cities of Timbuktu and Gao, which were under control of AQIM and MUJAO.

The MIA declared their intentions to fight extremism and terrorism. Arib told Voice of America that the separation between the MIA and Ansar Dine was conducted by the "moderate" part of the latter, which he stated existed for a long time and were opposed to Ansar Dine's offensive in southern Mali. Arib also stated that the MIA's goals, unlike the MNLA, was autonomy within Mali and not independence.

French anti-terrorism investigator Jean-Louis Bruguière expressed suspicion towards the MIA, claiming it's true motives and origins were unclear. Bruguiere also stated that it was "too early" to negotiate with the MIA, and believed that the group was formed to "gain time in the face of the progression by French and Malian troops."

The Islamic Movement of Azawad was dissolved on May 19, 2013, by Ag Intalla. Members of the group including Ag Intalla joined the High Council for the Unity of Azawad.
