= United Nations Security Council Resolution 2071 =

UN Security Council Resolution 2071
- Flag of Mali
- Date: 12 October 2012
- Meeting no.: 6,846
- Code: S/RES/2071 (Document)
- Subject: The situation in Mali
- Voting summary: 15 voted for; None voted against; None abstained
- Result: Adopted

Security Council composition
- Permanent members: China; France; Russia; United Kingdom; United States
- Non-permanent members: Azerbaijan; Colombia; Germany; Guatemala; India; Morocco; Pakistan; Portugal; South Africa; Togo

United Nations Security Council Resolution 2071 was unanimously adopted on 12 October 2012. It related to the 2012 Northern Mali conflict and mandated that an actionable plan for military intervention be made by ECOWAS and the African Union within 45 days.

== See also ==
- 2012 Northern Mali conflict § Proposed foreign intervention
- List of United Nations Security Council Resolutions 2001 to 2100
