= Tinzaouaten =

Tinzaouaten تين ظواتين ⵜⵉⵏⵣⴰⵡⴰⵜⴰⵏ
- Commune and village
- Location in Mali
- Coordinates: 19°56′55″N 2°58′04″E
- Country: Mali
- Region: Kidal Region
- Cercle: Abeïbara Cercle
- Control: Azawad Liberation Front

Area
  - Total: 8,750 km^{2} (3,380 sq mi)
- Elevation: 618 m (2,028 ft)

Population (2009 census)
  - Total: 2,300
  - Density: 0.26/km^{2} (0.68/sq mi)
- Time zone: UTC+1 (WAT)

Tinzaouaten (var. Tinzawatene and Tin-Zaouatene; Arabic: تين ظواتين) is a Saharan rural commune in the far northeast of Mali on the Algerian border.

== Geography ==
The commune is in the Abeïbara Cercle of the Kidal Region. It included a stop on a trans-Saharan trade route and a military post on the frontier under the French colonial regime. In 2009 the 8,000 square kilometer commune had a population of 2,300, most of whom are nomadic Tuareg. The Algerian settlement of Tin Zaoutine is on the Algerian side of the border.

== Recent history ==
In 2012, the commune was captured by MNLA and Ansar Dine rebels.

In 2019, Tinzaouaten was the headquarters of the Al-Qaeda-associated terrorist group Jama'at Nasr al-Islam wal Muslimin.

On July 25, 2024, Tuareg rebels of CSP-DPA ambushed a convoy of FAMA and Russian Wagner mercenaries in Tinzaouaten, beginning a 2-day battle. Over the course of the battle a sandstorm formed, forcing both sides to a temporary pause in fighting until July 26. The battle ended on July 27 resulting in the loss of several FAMA armored vehicles, a FAMA helicopter and the claimed deaths of 10 FAMA soldiers, up to 25-80+ Wagner Group mercenaries and 20 CSP-DPA soldiers.
