= Amghar (title) =

Amghar (plural imgharen) is a title of respect in the Berber world, generically meaning in Berber: "chief, ancestor, sage, or elder". It is used to designate various dignitaries or leaders, like the word "raïs" in Arabic or the word "sheikh". The term also designates the tribal chief (tribal leader) in traditional Berber societies.

In Kabylia, particularly in its history, the term has been used to designate various figures at the head of chiefdoms or tribes; especially in the Eastern Djurdjura and the Soummam Valley (where the Arabic word "cheikh" or "amin" does not exist), competing with the terms mezouar and amokrane. It generally serves to designate one or more leaders of village assemblies, the tajmaat; its plural form, imgharen, is then used.

In the Aurès Mountains, the traditional organization means that each village comprises factions led by a chief called "amghar", "amokrane", or kébir, who judges matters according to custom and whose opinions carry the force of law.

In the Rif Mountains, as in other regions, the "amghar" is also a chief at the head of a tribe or confederation. Abdelkrim El Khattabi was also known as "Amghar Mohand".

The same is true for the Middle Atlas. Amghar Moha ou Hammou, a figure of Zayane resistance, is notably nicknamed "the indomitable amghar of the Zayane" by Rivet.

Among the Tuareg, it designates a chief of a faction, tribe, or confederation. Among the Kel Ahaggar, amghars are more specifically the tribal chiefs placed under the Amenokal of the Tuareg (supreme chief of their confederation).
