= Azawad Liberation Front =

Militant group in northern Mali

- ⵜⴰⴶⴰⵉⵜ ⵢⵏ ⵢⵙⵢⵍⵢⵍⵓ ⴰⵣⴰⵓⴰⴷ جبهة تحرير أزواد; Front de libération de l'Azawad
- Emblem of the ALF
- Leader: Alghabass Ag Intalla
- Spokesperson: Mohamed Elmaouloud Ramadane
- Dates active: 30 November 2024 – present
- Merger of: National Movement for the Liberation of Azawad (MNLA); High Council for the Unity of Azawad (HCUA); Rebel fringes of the Arab Movement of Azawad (MAA); Rebel fringes of the Imghad Tuareg Self-Defense Group and Allies (GATIA)
- Active regions: Territory of the Azawad Liberation Front (Northern Mali)
- Ideology: Azawadian nationalism Berberism; Islamism
- Flag
- Website: Website

The Azawad Liberation Front (ALF; Tamashek: ⵜⴰⴶⴰⵉⵜ ⵢⵏ ⵢⵙⵢⵍⵢⵍⵓ ⴰⵣⴰⵓⴰⴷ; Arabic: جبهة تحرير أزواد; French: Front de libération de l'Azawad, abbr. FLA) is a separatist military organization in the region of Azawad in northern Mali. It was founded on 30 November 2024 and is led by Tuareg military commander Alghabass Ag Intalla.

The organization was formed after the dissolution of the Strategic Framework for the Defense of the People of Azawad, and included the National Movement for the Liberation of Azawad (MNLA), the High Council for Unity of Azawad (HCUA), and the Arab Movement of Azawad (MAA) and the Imghad Tuareg Self-Defense Group and Allies (GATIA). The organization was founded based on its demands for the independence or autonomy of Azawad.

== History ==
The Azawad Liberation Front's formation was announced in a press release, following a meeting held between 26 and 30 November 2024 by approximately 180 officials and members of the Strategic Framework for the Defense of the People of Azawad (CSP-DPA). The group declared its objective to be "the total liberation of Azawad and the formation of the Azawad Authority". It adopted a new flag and called for the "self-determination" of Azawad.

The organization was formed from the merger of four movements of the CSP into a single entity — the National Movement for the Liberation of Azawad (MNLA), the High Council for the Unity of Azawad (HCUA) and rebel fringes of the Arab Movement of Azawad (MAA) and Imghad Tuareg Self-Defense Group and Allies (GATIA).

The day after the creation of the FLA, seven or eight of its leaders were killed in a Bayraktar TB2 drone strike near Tinzaouaten, including Fahad Ag Almahmoud, head of the rebel branch of GATIA, and Choguibe Ag Attaher, an amenukal of the Tuareg tribe of Idnanes. On 25 April 2026, the FLA began offensives against the Malian Army and claimed control of Kidal and parts of Gao. The offensive was conducted in coordination with the Jama'at Nusrat al-Islam wal-Muslimin (JNIM), which launched attacks in other parts of the country.

On 14 August, 82 Malian prisoners of war have been freed by FLA. Mohamed Elmaouloud Ramadane, a spokesperson for the FLA, said that the release was conducted for “strictly humanitarian” reasons.

== Relations with other countries ==
Mali has often accused Algeria of supporting the Azawad Liberation Front, JNIM and other "terrorist groups" in the Sahel. Mauritania has also been accused by Bamako of providing safe haven for the FLA. Libya has been a major source of arms which are trafficked for and by Sahelian militants.

Bamako has blamed French authorities for backing the FLA and facilitating meetings of their leadership in Europe. Mali-based sources have asserted that France may be supporting the FLA against Mali in retaliation for Mali expelling the French from their country and replacing them with Russian forces.

Drone operators from the Ukrainian Main Directorate of Intelligence (HUR), whose country is at war with Russia, have also embedded with the FLA to assist in fighting Russian troops. Such specialists remotely assist in coordinating the FLA's drone warfare operations, hoping to "put pressure on Russia and undermine the notion that Moscow can be a reliable ally" along with testing their own drone programme in desert environments. While the Ukrainian government denies "substantial cooperation with the rebels", a spokesman for the HUR has described the relationship as the FLA receiving "necessary information" on Russia.

The FLA's leader, Alghabass Ag Intalla, has been reported to have close ties with the Qatari royal family, for whom he has arranged hunting trips in the Sahara.
