= List of wars involving Mali =

This is a list of wars involving the Republic of Mali.

Conflict	Combatant 1	Combatant 2	Results
Tuareg Rebellion of 1962–1964 (1962–1964)	Mali	Tuareg Tribal and Clan Groups	Victory: Rebellion suppressed
Agacher Strip War (1985)	Mali	Burkina Faso	Victory: Division of Agacher
Tuareg Rebellion of 1990–1995 (1990–1995)	Mali; Niger; Ganda Koy	Arab Islamic Front of Azawad (FIAA); Popular Movement for the Liberation of Azawad (MPLA); United Movements and Fronts of Azawad (MFUA); Front for the Liberation of Aïr and Azaouak (FLAA); Front for the Liberation of Tamoust (FLT); CRA & ORA coalitions (1994–1995)	Stalemate: 1995 peace accords
Tuareg Rebellion of 2007–2009 (2007–2009)	Mali; Niger	ADC; ATMNC (2008 split); Niger Movement for Justice; Front of Forces for Rectification (2008 split); Niger Patriotic Front (2009 split)	Stalemate: Peace deals brokered by Mali in August 2008 and February 2009; Ceasefire and amnesty declared in Niger in May 2009; Integration of some rebels into the military
War in the Sahel (2011–present)	Alliance of Sahel States: Mali; Niger; Burkina Faso; Benin; Togo (Note: JNIM has had a small presence in northern Togo since 2021, with several attacks carried out since then.); Ivory Coast (Note: Jihadist groups have little to no presence on Ivorian soil, but have occasionally launched attacks along the Burkinabe-Ivorian border since 2019. AQIM attacked Grand-Bassam in 2016 as well.); Algeria (Note: No jihadist groups are active on Algerian soil, although the country has been attacked several times in the early days of the Mali War by jihadist groups. Currently, diplomatic relations between the AES states and Algeria are bad due to Algeria allowing FLA rebels on their soil.); Mauritania (Note: The Mauritanian government currently has a non-aggression pact with JNIM-aligned jihadists, and has not had an attack by jihadist groups on its soil since 2011. Small JNIM cells are present along the Malian border.) Supported by: Africa Corps (since 2021) (Note: Previously Wagner Group, since renamed Africa Corps and absorbed by Russian government.); Turkey (since 2022); France (2013-2023); United States (until 2024); MINUSMA (2013-2023) (Note: For full list of MINUSMA combatants, see here); AFISMA (2012-2013); G5 Sahel (until 2023)	Al-Qaeda; Jama'at Nasr al-Islam wal Muslimin; Ansarul Islam; Boko Haram; Islamic State; Islamic State - Sahel Province; Lakurawa (2023-present); Islamic State - West Africa Province; Azawad Liberation Front Nigerien anti-coup movement: Patriotic Front for Justice; Free Armed Forces; Former belligerents: CSP-PSD (2023-2024); Coordination of Azawad Movements (2014-2021, 2023-2024); MNLA (2012-2024); HCUA (2013-2024); MAA (2012-2024) GATIA (al-Mahmoud faction) (2023–2024) (Note: Faction affiliated with the CSP-PSD) Patriotic Liberation Front (2023-2024)	Ongoing: Mali War: Tuareg rebels and allied Islamists overrun Northern Mali in 2012 until pushed back by a French intervention; Islamist insurgency in Burkina Faso: Mali War spills over into Burkina Faso by 2015 as Islamists capture about 40% of Burkinabé territory; Islamist insurgency in Niger; Boko Haram insurgency arises and extends in Chad, Niger, and Cameroon; French and American intervention on behalf of governments; Al-Qaeda–Islamic State conflict and the JNIM-ISGS war; Jihadist insurgency in Northern Benin; Rise of the coup belt
Tuareg Rebellion of 2012 (2012)	Mali FLNA; Ganda Iso	Azawad: MNLA; Ansar Dine; MOJWA	Defeat: Malian President Amadou Toumani Touré is outed by a coup d'état; MNLA and Ansar Dine take control of all Northern Mali territory; Independent state of Azawad declared by the MNLA and initially supported by Ansar Dine; Conflict between the MNLA and Ansar Dine (the latter receiving support from AQIM and MOJWA).
Mali War (2012–present)	Mali; France; Turkey; Chad; Nigeria	Azawad Ansar Dine; AQIM	Ongoing: Ceasefire with the MNLA

== See also ==
- Military of Mali
