= List of wars involving Niger =

This is a list of wars involving the Republic of Niger.

Conflict	Combatant 1	Combatant 2	Result
Gulf War (1990–1991)	Kuwait; United States; United Kingdom; France; Saudi Arabia Egypt; Ba'athist Syria; Morocco; Oman; Pakistan; Canada; United Arab Emirates; Qatar; Bangladesh; Italy; Australia; Netherlands; Niger; Bahrain; Belgium; Poland; Norway; Czechoslovakia; Greece; Denmark other allies	Ba'athist Iraq	Victory
Tuareg rebellion (1990–1995)	Niger; Mali; Ganda Iso	Mali: Arab Islamic Front of Azawad (FIAA), Popular Movement for the Liberation of Azawad (MPLA), United Movements and Fronts of Azawad (MFUA). Niger: Front for the Liberation of Aïr and Azaouak (FLAA), Front for the Liberation of Tamoust, (FLT), CRA & ORA coalitions (1994–95); Supported By: Libya	1995 peace accords
Insurgency in the Maghreb (2002–present)	Algeria / Mauritania; Tunisia; Libyan Arab Jamahiriya /(since 2011) Libya; Mali (United Nations) MINUSMA (from 2013); AFISMA (from 2013); Niger; Chad; France; Turkey Limited involvement: Morocco; Burkina Faso; Ivory Coast; Senegal; Spain; Supported by: United States (AFRICOM); United Kingdom; Italy; Egypt; Nigeria	GSPC (until 2007) AQIM (from 2007); Jama'at Nasr al-Islam wal Muslimin (from 2017); MOJWA (2011–13); Al-Mourabitoun (2013–17); Ansar Dine (2012–17); Ansar al-Sharia (Tunisia) (from 2011); Uqba ibn Nafi Brigade (from 2012); Ansar al-Sharia (Libya) (2012–2017); Salafia Jihadia (Islamic State) Boko Haram (from 2006, part of ISIL since 2015) Islamic State of Iraq and the Levant (from 2014): (Islamic State) Libyan Provinces; (Islamic State) Wilayat Gharb Ifriqiyyah; (Islamic State) Wilayat al-Jazair	Ongoing
Tuareg rebellion (2007–2009)	Niger; Mali	In Niger: Niger Movement for Justice; Front of Forces for Rectification (2008 split); Niger Patriotic Front (2009 split); In Mali: ADC; ATMNC (2008 split)	Victory
War in the Sahel (2011–present)	Alliance of Sahel States: Mali; Niger; Burkina Faso; Benin; Togo (Note: JNIM has had a small presence in northern Togo since 2021, with several attacks carried out since then.); Ivory Coast (Note: Jihadist groups have little to no presence on Ivorian soil, but have occasionally launched attacks along the Burkinabe-Ivorian border since 2019. AQIM attacked Grand-Bassam in 2016 as well.); Algeria (Note: No jihadist groups are active on Algerian soil, although the country has been attacked several times in the early days of the Mali War by jihadist groups. Currently, diplomatic relations between the AES states and Algeria are bad due to Algeria allowing FLA rebels on their soil.) / Mauritania (Note: The Mauritanian government currently has a non-aggression pact with JNIM-aligned jihadists, and has not had an attack by jihadist groups on its soil since 2011. Small JNIM cells are present along the Malian border.) Supported by: Africa Corps (since 2021) (Note: Previously Wagner Group, since renamed Africa Corps and absorbed by Russian government.); Turkey (since 2022); France (2013–2023); United States (until 2024); MINUSMA (2013–2023) (Note: For full list of MINUSMA combatants, see here); AFISMA (2012–2013); G5 Sahel (until 2023)	Al-Qaeda; Jama'at Nasr al-Islam wal Muslimin; Ansarul Islam; Boko Haram; Islamic State; Islamic State - Sahel Province; Lakurawa (2023–present); Islamic State - West Africa Province; Azawad Liberation Front Nigerien anti-coup movement: Patriotic Front for Justice; Free Armed Forces; Former belligerents: CSP-PSD (2023-2024); Coordination of Azawad Movements (2014-2021, 2023-2024); MNLA (2012-2024); HCUA (2013-2024); MAA (2012-2024) GATIA (al-Mahmoud faction) (2023–2024) (Note: Faction affiliated with the CSP-PSD) Patriotic Liberation Front (2023-2024)	Ongoing: Mali War: Tuareg rebels and allied Islamists overrun Northern Mali in 2012 until pushed back by a French intervention; Islamist insurgency in Burkina Faso: Mali War spills over into Burkina Faso by 2015 as Islamists capture about 40% of Burkinabé territory; Islamist insurgency in Niger; Boko Haram insurgency arises and extends in Chad, Niger, and Cameroon; French and American intervention on behalf of governments; Al-Qaeda–Islamic State conflict and the JNIM-ISGS war; Jihadist insurgency in Northern Benin; Rise of the coup belt
Boko Haram insurgency (2009–present)	Nigeria; Chad; Niger; Cameroon; Turkey	Boko Haram; Ansaru	Ongoing (Map of the current military situation): Expansion of conflict into neighboring Cameroon, Chad, Mali, and Niger; Turkish forces and Syrian mercenaries deployed to Niger; Coalition offensive in 2015 forces Boko Haram to retreat into the Sambisa Forest; Abubakar Shekau killed on 19 May 2021 amid ISWAP's capture of Sambisa Forest; Boko Haram largely dissolves and rise of ISWAP
2023 Nigerien coup d'état (2023)	Government of Niger: PNDS-Tarayya	National Council for the Safeguard of the Homeland M62 Movement	Coup was successful
2023 Nigerien crisis	National Council for the Safeguard of the Homeland M62 Movement; Burkina Faso; Mali; Supported by: Guinea	Government of Niger: Nigerien Party for Democracy and Socialism; ECOWAS (Note: The 2023 Nigerien coup d'état is opposed by active members of the ECOWAS bloc. Niger, Burkina Faso, Mali, and Guinea are members of ECOWAS that were suspended following coup d'états which established military juntas in their respective countries.); Benin; Cape Verde; The Gambia; Ghana; Guinea-Bissau; Ivory Coast; Liberia; Nigeria; Senegal; Sierra Leone; Togo; Supported by: France; United States; African Union	Victory: Complete French withdrawal by 22 December 2023
