= Battle of Gao =

Battle between MNLA and MOJWA in Gao, Mali

Coordinates: 16.2667°N 0.0500°W

- Part of the Malian Civil War
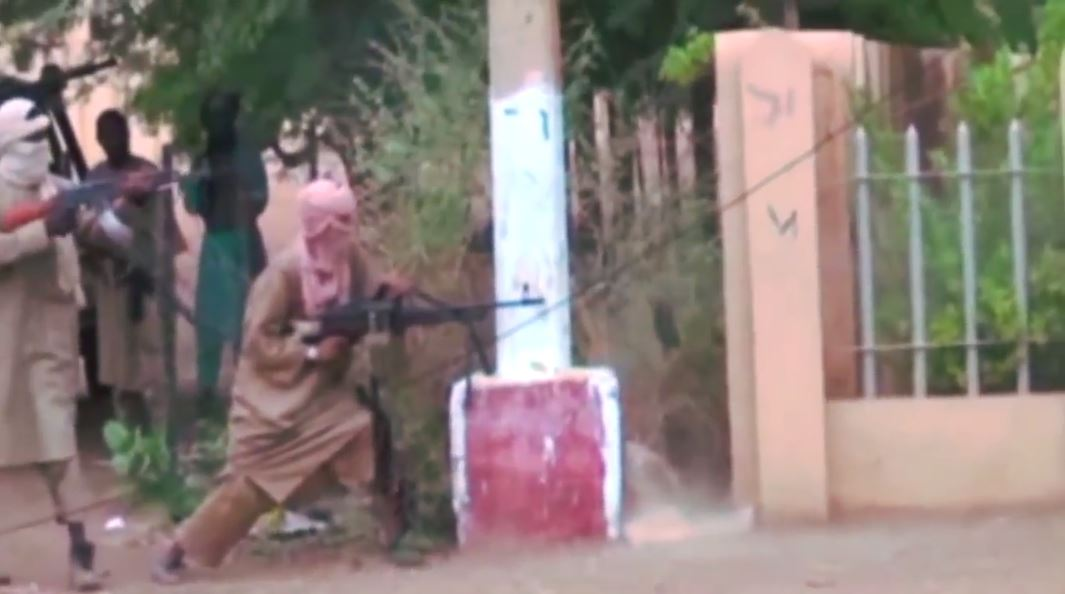
- Jihadists during fighting in the streets of Gao.
Date	26–28 June 2012
Location	Gao
Result	Decisive Islamist victory: Effective end of the self-proclaimed State of Azawad; Ansar Dine and MOJWA take over the largest cities of Azawad and the headquarters of the MNLA; Timbuktu World Heritage Site destroyed by Islamists

Belligerents
Azawad; MNLA	Islamists; MOJWA; AQIM; Ansar Dine; Boko Haram

Commanders and leaders
(Azawad) Bilal Ag Acherif (WIA) (Azawad) Colonel Bouna Ag Tahib † (Azawad) Machkanani Ag Balla (Azawad) Colonel Wari Ag Ibrahim †	Mokhtar Belmokhtar; Ahmad al-Faqi al-Mahdi; Abdelhamid Abou Zeid; Abubakar Shekau

Strength
140–2,000	500+

Casualties and losses
4 killed 10 wounded 40 captured	36 killed 14 wounded
- 35 killed overall, including 3 Niger fighters, and 41 wounded

The Battle of Gao was fought between the National Movement for the Liberation of Azawad (MNLA) and the Islamist Movement for Oneness and Jihad in West Africa (MOJWA), along with its ally Ansar Dine, in Gao between 26 and 28 June 2012. By the 28th of June, Gao, Timbuktu and Kidal, the three biggest cities in the disputed secessionist region of Azawad within what is recognised as Malian territory, were under the control of Ansar Dine and its Islamist allies.

Two days later, parts of the World Heritage Site of Timbuktu had started to be destroyed, amid condemnation by the UN Educational, Scientific and Cultural Organization (UNESCO), the Organisation of Islamic Cooperation (OIC), Mali and France. This was followed by criticism within the region and internationally with Economic Community of West African States (ECOWAS) suggesting it could send an armed intervention force into the country and the International Criminal Court (ICC) following Mali's lead in terming the acts as "war crimes." While MNLA also criticised the Islamists for holding civilians and destroying the structures, Ansar Dine said that the destruction was due to violation of sharia (their Najdi interpretation) and in reaction to UNESCO's labeling of the sites of Timbuktu and in Gao as "in danger."

== Background ==
Following previous Tuareg rebellions in 2007–2009 and the Libyan Civil War, in early 2012 the MNLA and Islamist movements captured northern Mali. Tensions then started between the MNLA and Islamist movements over the use of sharia law within the territory. Clashes started to erupt between both sides after a merge attempt failed, despite the signing of an accord to share power. On 25 June, the Islamist Ansar Dine took control of Kidal.

Protests broke out on 26 June in the city of Gao, the majority of whose people are not Tuaregs (as opposed to the MNLA), but rather sub-Saharan groups such as the Songhay and Fula peoples. The protestors opposed the Tuareg rebels and the partition of Mali. Two were killed as a result of the protests, allegedly by MNLA troops. The protesters used both Malian and Islamist flags, and France 24 reported that many locals supported the Islamists as a result of their opposition to the Tuareg nationalists and the secession of Azawad.

== Involved groups and number of fighters ==
The forces involved were not known precisely. At the end of May 2012, the MNLA claimed to have 1,500 to 2,000 men in and around Gao, yet the movement recognized that several hundred of its fighters have deserted to join Ansar Dine, attracted by the financial gain they would gain by the terrorist group, and by the personality of its leader, Iyad Ag Ghaly. Towards the end of March or the beginning of April, French investigative journalists managed to enter Gao with the help of the MNLA, and they noticed that the MLNA controlled the Gao airport and the governorate, but that the city was mainly held by Islamists which were in control of most patrols. Regarding the number of fighters, they initially find the presence of fifty men at the airport, subsequently 300 gathered with pickups, a BM-21 and a BRDM-2. No planes were at the airport, just a damaged and unusable Mil Mi-24 helicopter. In mid-June 2012, Intallah Ag Assai, an MNLA colonel, said that the airport served as a base for their weapons and equipment, with more than half of their war material being seized from battles with the army. According to him the MNLA had 30 tanks in working order and 10 others in repair as well as a helicopter. The number of his fighters was 2,000, of which however half he recognized, were young recruits still inexperienced. The forces of the jihadists were even less known. Gao was mainly occupied by MUJAO, a group that had a total of 500 to 1,000 combatants, concentrated mainly in the Gao region. Fighters from Ansar Dine were also present, as well as a contingent of about one hundred men from Boko Haram and one of five katiba brigade-battalions from AQIM, katiba Al-Mouthalimin, commanded by Mokhtar Belmokhtar. Belmokhtar was suspected as the one who commanded the assault on the positions of the MNLA during the battle.

== Battle ==
On June 25, 2012, a local elected official and teacher of the city, Idrissa Oumarou was shot at close range by strangers on motorcycle. This murder provoked the anger of the population, and the next day hundreds of people demonstrated in the city. The anger of the population overwhelmed by the regular deprivation of water and electricity and by insecurity soon turned against the MNLA's independence movement. According to testimonies the flags of the MUJAO were mixed with the Malian flags during the event. When the demonstrators arrived near the governorate, MNLA men opened fire to disperse the rioters, one or two protesters were killed and at least 12 to 14 wounded. Fighting began in the morning of 26 June, with both sides firing heavy weapons. MNLA Secretary General Bilal ag Acherif was wounded in the attack. After being extricated from the fighting, he was later taken to a hospital in Burkina Faso's capital city of Ouagadougou; while Colonel Bouna Ag Tahib, a defector from the Malian army, was killed. MOJWA soon took control of the Gao governor's palace as well as Ag Acherif's residence. A MOJWA spokesman stated that 40 MNLA troops had been taken prisoner.

The MNLA's Azawad Vice President Mahamadou Djeri Maïga acknowledged that they lost control of the city but said that the fight would continue. He asked for international help against Al-Qaeda in the Islamic Maghreb (AQIM), who he stated was responsible for the attack. The next day the MNLA were evicted from the city. Two videos seen by the Agence France-Presse (AFP) showed the black flag of jihad groups and some members of the group saying "Long Live Mali" and singing the national anthem of Mali, respectively.

Algeria's Ennahar TV reported that Mokhtar Belmokhtar, a founding member of AQIM, was probably killed during the battle. A previous death toll of 20 was later revised by doctors who added the number of dead found in the Niger River and the wounded who succumbed to their injuries. Thirty more Algerian fighters were said to have arrived in the city on 29 June to support AQIM and its leader Mokhtar Belmokhtar as the latter seeks to maintain a hold on the town and track MNLA fighters.

=== Reactions ===
Ansar Dine's Chief of Security for Gao, Omar Ould Hamaha, said that the group controls the region and would impose sharia.

Our fighters control the perimeter. We control Timbuktu completely. We control Gao completely. It's Ansar Dine that commands the north of Mali. Now we have every opportunity to apply sharia. Sharia does not require a majority vote. It's not democracy. It's the divine law that was set out by God to be followed by his slaves. One hundred percent of the north of Mali is Muslim, and even if they don't want this, they need to go along with it.

Paris-based MNLA spokesman, Moussa Ag Assarid, said that though the group had lost ground in the big cities "we control 90% of the Azawad."

On 26 June 2012 the Tomb of Askia, which had been listed as part of a UNESCO World Heritage Site, was named by UNESCO as "endangered" at the behest of Mali amid fears of damage to "important ancient manuscripts" from being "looted and smuggled abroad by unscrupulous dealers." Two days later, the same was done for Timbuktu. A statement by the World Heritage Committee also read that it "asked Mali's neighbours to do all in their power to prevent the trafficking in cultural objects from these sites."

ECOWAS then met on 29 June in the Ivorian capital of Yamoussoukro in order to work towards "additional measures to prevent matters in Mali becoming bogged down," according to host President Alassane Ouattara. The meeting was also attended by the mediator for the Malian crisis following the 2012 Malian coup d'etat, Burkina Faso President Blaise Compaore, Niger President Mahamadou Issoufou and Malian interim Prime Minister Cheick Modibo Diarra. While the group was expected to call for negotiations with movements in the Azawad region, it was also expected to continue with plans to get a 3,300 personnel intervention force together to invade the region.

=== Aftermath ===
Subsequently, talks seem to have been initiated between the MNLA and the Islamists. On June 28, Iyad Ag Ghali, Emir of Ansar Dine, arrived in Gao with 60 vehicles and several hundred men. On the 30th, he left the city and met three officers of the MNLA. Colonels Machkanani, Ntala and Salat. A ceasefire was then signed. By 2 July, AQIM, along with its allies, were reported to have mined the periphery of the city. The MNLA spokesman, Mossa Ag Attaher, said that AQIM was "using the population as hostages, as a human shield to protect itself from an MNLA counter-attack...Many people are trying to escape, to take the bus to go to Bamako, but the Islamists are stopping them."

On 3 July, MOJWA released 25 MNLA prisoners who had been captured during the battle to show that "they were for the peace," after being asked to do so by Iyad Ag Ghaly. At the same time, Guinean President Alpha Condé said that an ECOWAS military intervention would be directed against the Islamists and not the MNLA.
