= Battle of Goumakoura =

- Part of the 2012 Tuareg rebellion
- Battle of Goumakoura (Mali)
Date	24 February 2012
Location	near Segou, Mali
Result	Mali victory

Belligerents
Mali: Malian Army	Azawad: MNLA

Commanders and leaders
(Mali) Takini Ag Intikane	(Azawad) Bouna Ag Attiyoub (Azawad) Rhissa Ag Akli

Strength
Several thousand soldiers (according to the MNLA)	2 brigades

Casualties and losses
1 killed 3-6 wounded (according to Mali); 30 killed 2 tanks destroyed 6 vehicles destroyed (according to the MNLA)	4 killed 3 wounded (according to the MNLA); 7+ killed 20+ wounded (according to Mali)

The battle of Goumakoura took place during the Tuareg rebellion of 2012. On February 24, 2012, a military camp of the Malian army was attacked by the MNLA. The attack was however repelled.

== The battle ==
On February 24, the MNLA attacked the military camp of Goumakoura, located in Ségou. According to the separatists, the clashes started at 6 am and were over between 12 and 1 pm.

The MNLA claimed that it launched this attack outside its claimed territory in retaliation for the bombing near Anefis of a Marabout tribe of the Kal-Assouk committed by Ukrainian mercenaries in the service of the Malian army. According to the MNLA, between one and four people were killed by this bombing and 13 injured, mostly elderly people, women and children. According to Médecins sans Frontières, which cared for the wounded with a team from the Malian Ministry of Health, one girl was fatally wounded in the bombing and 10 people were wounded, including nine women and children and three seriously.

The MNLA was reportedly led by two deserters from the Malian army, Colonel Bouna and Akli, former commander of Goumankoura. Their forces include two brigades. According to the Malian army, reinforcements, commanded by Colonel Takini and from Ségou, routed the attackers. Both sides claimed the victory, however the ground remained to the Malian soldiers.
