= Battle of Sudere =

- Part of 2012 Northern Mali conflict
- Battle of Sudere (Mali)
Date	15 March 2012
Location	Sudere, Mali
Result	Indecisive

Belligerents
Azawad: MNLA	Mali: Ganda Iso

Commanders and leaders
(Azawad) Mbarek Ag Akly	(Mali) Amadou Diallo

Strength
Unknown	Unknown

Casualties and losses
6 killed 7 wounded 1 captured (according to Amadou Diallo); 1 killed 1 wounded (according to MNLA)	2 wounded 1 captured (according to Ganda Izo); 15 killed 1 captured (according to MNLA)

On 15 March 2012, MNLA rebels attacked a Ganda Izo militia base in Soudere, 35 kilometers east of Tessit. According to information provided to the Malian press, the fight lasted from 8am to 5pm. Amadou Diallo, the leader of the Ganda Izo militia, claims that the attack was carried out by the Tuareg rebel Akli Iknane of the Imghad tribe. He and his men were deserters from the Malian National Guard who had been sent to fight MNLA.

Amadou Diallo says: "We heard of an attack by armed elements against people and their property in the area and went to look for them when suddenly we were fired on by the fugitives." For its part, the MNLA accuses militiamen of abuses against civilians including Ebang Imalane encampment and in a village near Ansongo where they claim that one man was executed and another kidnapped. According to some sources, the attackers reportedly lost two men and one of them was captured by Ganda Izo. Amadou Diallo, for his part says that the losses of the rebels are six killed, seven wounded, that admitted to the hospital of Gao, and a prisoner who was handed over to the regional authorities.

Regarding his losses, Ganda Izo said two were wounded and one had been captured. According to the MNLA, the fighting resulted in one death and one wounded on their side against fifteen killed and one prisoner in the militia.
