= FPLA =

FPLA may refer to:

- Fair Packaging and Labeling Act – a United States law that applies to labels on many consumer products
- Field-programmable logic array – a Signetics product that was a precursor to Programmable Array Logic
- Popular Liberation Front of Azawad (in French: Front Populaire de Libération de l'Azawad) – a militant rebel group in northern Mali
- Free-piston linear alternator – essentially a linear motor used as an electrical generator
