= Iyad Ag Ghali =

Malian Tuareg militant (born 1954)

- إياد أغ غالي

Emir of Jama'at Nusrat al-Islam wal-Muslimin (Note: also leads the territory)
- Incumbent
- Assumed office 2 March 2017
- Deputy: Djamel Okacha (2017–2019); Sedane Ag Hita (2019–present)
- Preceded by: Office established

Emir of Ansar Dine (Note: also leads territory)
- In office Circa. 21 March 2012 – 2 March 2017
- Preceded by: Office established
- Succeeded by: Office abolished

Leader of the People's Movement for the Liberation of Azawad
- In office 1988 – 26 March 1996
- Preceded by: Office established
- Succeeded by: Office abolished

Personal details
- Born: 1954 (age 71–72) Abeïbara, Kidal Region, French Sudan
- Nickname: The Strategist

Military service
- Allegiance: MPLA (1988–1996); Al-Qaeda (Circa. 2012–present)
- Branch/service: Ansar Dine (2012–2017); Jama'at Nusrat al-Islam wal Muslimin (2017–present)
- Battles/wars: Tuareg rebellion (1990–1995); Insurgency in the Maghreb; Mali War; 2012 Tuareg rebellion; 2026 Mali attacks

Iyad Ag Ghali (Note: Arabic: إياد أغ غالي) (born 1954), also known by the nom de guerre Abu al-Fadl, (Note: Arabic: أبو الفضل, romanized: Abū al-Faḍl) is a Malian Tuareg Islamist militant and former musician who is the founder and leader of the Jama'at Nusrat al-Islam wal-Muslimin (JNIM) since 2017.

Born in the Kidal Region in northern Mali into the Ifogha tribe of Tuaregs, Ghali was a percussionist for the musical collective Tinariwen. He participated in the Tuareg rebellions against the government of Mali since the 1980s. He founded the Popular Movement for the Liberation of Azawad (PMLA) in 1988 and later became popular figure amongst Azawadian separatists. In 1991, he signed the Tamanrasset Accords and, after the 1996 ceasefire, normalised relations with the Malian government.

In 2008, Ghali was appointed as a member of Mali's diplomatic staff in Jeddah, Saudi Arabia, by President Amadou Toumani Touré. Once a singer, drinker and chain-smoker, Ghali became increasingly religious after being proselytised by Pakistani Islamic scholars affiliated with the Tablighi Jamaat in Saudi Arabia. Ghali soon developed ties with jihadists in Saudi Arabia, after which he was called back to Mali and put under suspicion. Following the outbreak of the Mali War, Ghali founded the Islamist militant group Ansar Dine and became its leader. In February 2013, the US Department of State designated Ghali as a Specially Designated Global Terrorist. In 2017, Ghali's Ansar Dine and other Islamist groups merged into a united JNIM, of which Ghali was elected the emir. Under his leadership, the JNIM has gained territory in most of eastern Mali.

== Early life ==
Iyad Ag Ghali was born in 1954 Mali's Kidal Region. He belongs to the noble family of the Ifogha tribal group, an influential Berber Tuareg clan in the Kidal region. Although he would eventually distance himself from music, Ag Ghali was formerly a percussionist for the musical collective Tinariwen.

== Battles and wars ==
=== Role in 1990 rebellion ===
On the night of 28 June 1990, Ghali directed attacks by the Popular Movement for the Liberation of Azawad (MPLA) on Tidermèn and Ménaka that killed eighteen people, including at least four Malian Army soldiers. These evening raids were the beginning of a renewed Tuareg rebellion in Mali. From 1991 until a formal truce with the Malian government in 1996, Ghali led the rebel group Popular Movement of Azawad, one of four splinter groups created from the MPLA's disintegration after Ghali signed the Tamanrasset Accords in Algeria on behalf of the Tuareg people fighting for an independent homeland in January 1991. Ghali was reportedly escorted to Bamako, Mali's southern capital, after signing the accords. As a result of his perceived closeness to the "traditional hierarchy", according to one analyst, Ghali was unable to hold together the MPLA after signing the controversial agreement, though ultimately a coup in March 1991 overturned the Accords and fighting went on.

By 1995, Radio France Internationale referred to Ghali as the "undisputed leader" of the Tuareg rebel movement. After the 1996 ceasefire, Ghali normalised relations with the Malian government. In 2003, he was instrumental in negotiating the release of 14 German tourist hostages from Al-Qaeda in the Islamic Maghreb, then called "the Algerian Salafi Group for Call and Combat". In a leaked US diplomatic cable, the author described Ghali as a "proverbial bad penny" who always turned up when a Western government had to give money to Tuaregs.

His gift for strategic thinking allegedly earned him the nickname, the Strategist. In 2008, he was appointed as one of Mali's diplomats to Saudi Arabia. Ghali was appointed as a member of Mali's diplomatic staff in Jeddah, Saudi Arabia, by President Amadou Toumani Touré in 2008. Once "a great fan of cigarettes, booze, and partying", interested in music and poetry, with connections to the Tuareg band Tinariwen, he was proselytised to strict Islam by Pakistani Islamic scholars affiliated with the Tablighi Jamaat missionary movement. In Saudi Arabia he experienced a "religious re-birth", growing a large beard and meeting with unnamed jihadists. The latter action caused him to be recalled to Bamako.

=== 2012 rebellion ===
Ghali, having returned to Mali, initially worked as a liaison between the Malian government and Tuareg fighters that returning from Libya after the fall of Muammar Gaddafi in 2011. He is reported to have used this position to try and take over the leadership of the Tuareg group Kel Adagh and the National Movement for the Liberation of Azawad (MNLA). It has been suggested that a contributory factor to his failure was that their leadership is dominated by noble Tuareg clans, to which Ghali does not belong.

Unable to take a leadership role within the MNLA, the mainstream Tuareg rebellion, Ghali announced the formation of the Islamist Ansar Dine, which he claimed controlled much of northeastern Mali, in a video statement. Ghali also stated that his fighters were responsible for a bloody attack on the commune of Aguelhok two months before. He said the group would continue to fight until sharia law was established throughout Mali. The announcement created friction with the MNLA, a secular group fighting for Azawad's independence from Mali, including former allies of Ghali who urged him to break his rumoured ties to Al Qaeda in the Islamic Maghreb. When Ghali reportedly refused to disavow any association with the al Qaeda offshoot, the MNLA branded him a "criminal" and issued a statement claiming the "theocratic regime" envisioned by Ghali contradicted "the foundations of [Tuareg] culture and civilization". Although Ghali's militants appeared to coordinate with the MNLA in the capture of Kidal, the Associated Press reported that the day after it fell to rebel fighters, Ansar Dine militants removed the colorful flags of Azawad planted by their MNLA comrades-in-arms throughout the city.

Jeremy Keenan, a professor at the School of Oriental and African Studies in London, stated that the military contribution of Ghali's fighters was slight compared to the much larger MNLA: "What seems to happen is that when they move into a town, the MNLA take out the military base — not that there's much resistance — and Iyad goes into town and puts up his flag and starts bossing everyone around about sharia law." According to Keenan, Ghali is linked to the Algerian intelligence service.

On 3 April, Ghali gave a radio interview in Timbuktu announcing that Sharia law would be enforced in the city, including the veiling of women, the stoning of adulterers, and the punitive mutilation of thieves. According to Timbuktu's mayor, the announcement caused nearly all of Timbuktu's Christian population to flee the city. On 26 February 2013, the U.S. Department of State designated Ghali as a Specially Designated Global Terrorist.

=== Jama'at Nusrat al-Islam wal-Muslimin ===
On 2 March 2017, Ghali pledged his oath of allegiance to al-Qaeda's Ayman al-Zawahiri and the Taliban's leader Hibatullah Akhundzada, and formed the Jama'at Nusrat al-Islam wal-Muslimin.

=== Siege of Timbuktu ===
Starting in 2023, Ghali's jihadist forces imposed an ongoing blockade on the city of Timbuktu. Food shortages and violence are rampant in the blockaded area.

== Sanctions and legal proceedings ==
=== ISIL (Da'esh) and Al-Qaida Sanctions Committee ===
In 2013, the United Nations Security Council committee listed Ghali under the ISIL (Da'esh) and Al-Qaida Sanctions Committee. The US State Department listed Ghali as a Specially Designated Global Terrorist in February 2013.

=== ICC arrest warrant ===
On 18 July 2017, the International Criminal Court issued an arrest warrant against Ghali alleging that he committed crimes against humanity and war crimes during the Tuareg rebellion, including the execution of Malian soldiers who were prisoners of war during the Battle of Aguelhok. On 21 June 2024, the arrest warrant was unsealed by a pre-trial chamber in response to the prosecution's request.

In 2026, the Malian government offered a reward of two billion CFA francs ($3.5 million), for information leading to Ghali's capture or killing.
