= Arab Islamic Front of Azawad =

Mali rebel group until 1991

Arab Islamic Front of Azawad (in French: Front Islamique Arabe de l'Azawad or FIAA) was a militant rebel group in northern Mali. It was headed by Ahmed Ould Sidi Mohamed.

Alone among Mali's many northern rebel groups, the FIAA drew its members mainly from north-west Mali's Hassani Arab minority, which is closely related by tribal ties, dialect and culture to the Moorish population of Mauritania and the Sahrawis of Western Sahara, Algeria and Morocco. Most other rebel groups in Mali's civil war were dominated by the north's larger population of Tuareg.

On January 6, 1991, the MPLA and FIAA signed the Algeria-backed Tamanrasset Accords with the government of Mali. The accord, however, failed to prevent further conflict. In December 1991 FIAA joined the United Movements and Fronts of Azawad (MFUA), which would then sign the National Pact peace treaty.

== See also ==
- Arab Movement of Azawad
- Azawadi declaration of independence
- Jama'at Nasr al-Islam wal Muslimin
- Niger Movement for Justice
- Northern Mali conflict
- Popular Movement for the Liberation of Azawad
- Tuareg rebellion (1962–1964)
- Tuareg rebellion (1990–1995)
- Tuareg rebellion (2007–2009)
- Tuareg rebellion (2012)
- Mali War
