= Arab Movement of Azawad =

Arab military organization active in northern Mali

- الحركة العربية الأزوادية; Mouvement arabe de l’Azawad
- Emblem used by the movement
- Leaders: Ahmed Ould Sidi Muhammad (General Secretary); Hussein Ould Ghulam (Chief of Staff)
- Dates active: Early 2012 – June to October 2014 (de-facto dissolved)
- Active regions: Azawad/northern Mali
- Ideology: Arab nationalism Pan-Arabism; Secularism; Autonomy of Azawad
- Size: 500–600 (claimed)
- Wars: 2012 Tuareg rebellion Mali War

The Arab Movement of Azawad (Arabic: الحركة العربية الأزوادية, French: Mouvement arabe de l’Azawad; MAA) was an Arab military organization active in Azawad/northern Mali. Initially known as the National Liberation Front of Azawad (French: Front de libération nationale de l'Azawad; FLNA), it was formed in early 2012, during the 2012 Tuareg rebellion. The MAA claimed to be a secular, non-terrorist organization, whose main objective was to defend the interests of all the Arab peoples of northern Mali.

It was willing to "work with France against terrorism, drug trafficking and organized crime" in the region. The group calls for granting substantial autonomy to northern Mali. The group was de facto dissolved in 2014.

Since then, however, the MAA has split into two factions – one in favor of greater autonomy within a united Mali, the other taking a harder line on independence for the north and was part of CSP-DPA. The pro-Bamako faction of the MAA is led by Professor Ahmed Sidi Ould Mohamed and is largely based in the Gao region with a military base at Inafarak (near the Algerian border), while the dissident or separatist faction is led by Sidi Brahim Ould Sidati.

== History ==
The MAA was formed as the National Liberation Front of Azawad (FLNA) in early 2012. It was largely composed of Beidane militia fighters who had organized to defend Timbuktu during the advance by the forces of the Tuareg National Movement for the Liberation of Azawad (MNLA) and the Islamist Ansar Dine against the city. The new group claimed to oppose both the independence of Azawad from Mali and the imposition of sharia law in the region. After Timbuktu fell to the rebels on April 1, 2012, the FLNA briefly occupied the city in turn on April 27, but departed after Abdelhamid Abou Zeid, a leading member of al-Qaeda in the Islamic Maghreb (AQIM), issued a demand for them to leave.

The FLNA initially had difficulty securing support among the Arab-Berber Berabiche Moor community in northern Mali; its leaders were attacked for being involved in the drug smuggling trade in northern Mali, and for being partially responsible for the escalation of violence in the region. They were also accused of helping AQIM in their takeover of Timbuktu. The FLNA nevertheless continued its operations in northern Mali, acting independently of both the MNLA and the Islamists, and subsequently changed its name to the Arab Movement of Azawad (MAA).

In December 2012, the MAA claimed to have a "very good relationship" with the Tuareg MNLA in spite of "small differences" between the two organizations, but by the following year both groups were openly hostile to one another. On February 23, 2013, the MAA attacked the MNLA in the town of al-Khalil, near Tessalit; it also accused MNLA soldiers of having seized the vehicles of Arabs in the region, emptying their shops and raping women. On February 24, the French Air Force launched airstrikes against MAA targets, which reportedly injured five MAA soldiers and destroyed five of their vehicles. An MAA spokesman responded by denouncing the intervention, characterizing the French action as providing "open support" to the MNLA.

In early April 2013, the MAA participated in a conference which brought together the leaders of various Arab groups and clans in Azawad. The conference, which was held in the Mauritanian capital Nouakchott, ended with the formation of a new organization, the Convergence of Arab Movements and Associations for the Unity and Development of Azawad, which was tasked with representing the interests of all Arab communities in the region. The head of the MAA was appointed as a member of the board of the Convergence.

On 21 April 2013, the MAA occupied the town of Ber, approximately 50 kilometers north of Timbuktu. Arab fighters returned to the town on May 5; they looted shops and houses and then departed. The MAA denied responsibility for this second incident and claimed that the looters were acting contrary to orders. On May 17, the MAA claimed to have entered Anefis, to the southwest of Kidal, after a clash with MNLA fighters. Intervention by the French military, however, forced the MAA to depart by the following day. The MNLA rejected this version of events, claiming instead that the combatants who entered Anefis were members of the Islamist Movement for Oneness and Jihad in West Africa (MUJAO).

Sidi Brahim Ould Sidati was assassinated in Bamako on April 13, 2021.

== Organization and strength ==
The MAA is led by a Secretary General; as of April 2013, this office was held by Ahmed Ould Sidi Muhammad. An MAA spokesman stated in December 2012 that the organization's structure also contained an executive council, an advisory council and a chief of staff.

The MAA claims to have a strength of 500 men; many of its officers are deserters from the Malian Army. The movement has two strongholds in northern Mali, the first being Tilemsi near Mauritania and the second being Tinafareg near Algeria. MAA is dominated by members of the Lamhar clan.

== Relationship with local Islamists ==
The MAA has repeatedly claimed to be a secular organization, opposed to Islamist groups operating in northern Mali. Outside knowledge of motivations of the movement, however, remains relatively obscure, and the group has been accused in the past of collaborating with the Islamist AQIM. Wolfram Lacher, an analyst of the Mali conflict, noted that the leaders of the FNLA/MAA had close family and commercial ties with AQIM, and concluded that "it is doubtful whether [the MAA] would be willing and able to confront AQIM."

As part of the dispute between the MNLA and the MAA, the MNLA has accused the latter of being an ally with the Islamist Movement for Oneness and Jihad in West Africa (MUJAO), to the point where there is no real distinction between the two groups. This claim has been rejected by Salem Beghi, an officer of MAA, who stated in March 2013 that the MAA has previously engaged in battles with al-Qaeda in the Islamic Maghreb and MUJAO "terrorists" and claimed that the MAA has always fought against terrorist organizations in northern Mali.

== See also ==
- Azawad
- Arab Islamic Front of Azawad
- National Movement for the Liberation of Azawad
- Ansar Dine
- Azawadi declaration of independence
- Jama'at Nasr al-Islam wal Muslimin
- Niger Movement for Justice
- Northern Mali conflict
- Popular Movement for the Liberation of Azawad
- Tuareg rebellion (1962–1964)
- Tuareg rebellion (1990–1995)
- Tuareg rebellion (2007–2009)
- Tuareg rebellion (2012)
- Battle of Khalil
