= Tamanrasset Accords =

The Tamanrasset Accords of 1991 were signed on January 6, 1991, between Malian chief of staff Colonel Ousmane Coulibaly, the chief of staff of the Malian Army, and Iyad Ag Ghaly, representing Tuareg militants. The accords aimed to put an end to the Tuareg rebellion of 1990, and led to the demilitarization of northern Mali, including the cities of Kidal, Gao, and Timbuktu. The accords were signed in Tamanrasset, Algeria, under Algerian mediation.

Following the agreement, the National Movement for the Liberation of Azawad split into four groups; the Popular Front for the Liberation of Azawad, the Revolutionary Army for the Liberation of Azawad, and the People's Movement for the Liberation of Azawad, led by Iyad Ag Ghaly. The agreement also created a lack of Malian presence in northern Mali.
