= Flag of Azawad =

Flag of the unrecognized state of Azawad

Azawad
- Flag of the state of Azawad (2012)
- Use: National flag
- Proportion: 3:5
- Adopted: 6 April 2012
- Design: Horizontal green, red, and black stripes with a yellow triangle at hoist
- Flag of the Azawad Liberation Front
- Use: National flag and ensign
- Proportion: 3:5
- Adopted: November 2024
- Design: Horizontal red, yellow, and blue stripes with a white triangle at hoist

The flag of the State of Azawad, an unrecognized state that declared independence from Mali on 6 April 2012, is a horizontal green-red-black tricolour with a yellow triangle at the hoist. The symbolism behind colours to the Azawadi people are manifold as described by Moussa Ag Assarid: yellow representing the Sahara desert (in Tamacheq "tenere"), black representing the arduous history of the Tuaregs connected to anti-colonial struggle in their many uprisings as well as their difficult way of life, red representing the blood of the Azawadi martyrs and green which represents the scant vegetation in its Saharan and Sahelian regions. It is the same as the flag of the National Movement for the Liberation of Azawad. A popular variation of the flag includes a red "yaz" or "ⵣ" letter in Tifinagh that serves as a universal symbol of the Amazigh people within its yellow hoist. This version has a more specific reference to the Tuareg demographic in Azawad versus the Fulani, Songhai and Mauritanian (Beidane and Haratin) ethnicities present.

== History ==
During previous Tuareg rebellions two different flags were proposed for Azawad. One was a blue and white horizontal bicolour with a red triangle at the hoist (akin to a Czech flag with colours rotated clockwise), and the other was a plain white flag with a blue crescent and star.

Previously proposed flag of Azawad by the Tuareg Liberation Front

Previously proposed flag of Azawad (according to James Minahan: Nations Without States)

Flag of the Azawad Liberation Front (Dark version)

== See also ==
- Pan-African colours
- Berber flag
- French Sudan
- Tuareg rebellion (disambiguation)
