= Mahmoud Ag Aghaly =

Malian politician

President of the Political Bureau of MNLA
- Incumbent
- Assumed office October 2011
- Preceded by: Position established
- Succeeded by: Bilal Ag Acherif

Mahmoud Ag Aghaly (last name also spelled Ghaly or Ghali) is an Azawadi politician who is the president of the political bureau of the MNLA and the president of the executive committee directing the self-proclaimed Independent State of Azawad as of 6 April 2012. His term ended on 15 June 2012, and he was replaced by Bilal Ag Acherif. Aghaly is a former teacher and businessman.
