= Revolutionary Liberation Army of Azawad =

The Revolutionary Liberation Army of Azawad (French: Armée révolutionnaire de libération de l'Azawad, abbreviated ARLA) is a Tuareg militant rebel group in northern Mali. The ARLA surged as a dissident group opposing the Tamanrasset Accords. In December 1991, the ARLA joined the United Movements and Fronts of Azawad (MFUA), which signed the National Pact peace treaty.

== See also ==
- Tuareg Rebellion (1990–1995)
