= Azawadian declaration of independence =

2012 proclamation of Azawad's independence from Mali

- MNLA's adopted flag for their independent state of Azawad
- Created: 6 April 2012
- Location: Gao
- Author: National Movement for the Liberation of Azawad
- Signatories: Secretary General; Bilal Ag Acherif
- Purpose: Independence of the Azawad from Mali

On 6 April 2012, the National Movement for the Liberation of Azawad (French acronym: MNLA) unilaterally declared Azawad independent from the Republic of Mali in the wake of a rebellion which was preceded by a string of other Tuareg rebellions.

== History ==
Following the return of 5,000 soldiers after the Libyan Civil War in 2011 and the formation of the National Movement for the Liberation of Azawad, an insurgency commenced on 17 January 2012 with an attack in the Kidal Region, near the border with Algeria. Following the March coup d'état, the rebels made further inroads to capture the three biggest cities of Kidal, Gao and Timbuktu in three days, respectively. At this point, other factions joined the fighting, including the Islamist Ansar Dine and the Movement for Oneness and Jihad in West Africa. Despite reports of Ansar Dine taking control of most of what was initially captured by or with the help of the MNLA, the group established their writ over large swathes of the territory. The Tuareg peoples had also long complained of marginalisation within Mali.

== Declaration of Independence ==
The Secretary-General of the MNLA, Bilal Ag Acherif, signed the declaration in Gao, the site of the largest Malian military outpost in the north, on 6 April 2012. It was announced by Moussa ag Attaher on France 24.

The declaration was issued in French on behalf of the "voice of the National Movement for the Liberation of Azawad" and in consultation with the executive committee, the Revolutionary Council, the Consultative Council, the State-Major of the Army of Liberation and the regional offices. It also cited as reasoning France's unilateral attachment of the region to Mali despite an appeal to French President Charles de Gaulle.

The document concluded by adding that the new state declared by the MNLA would recognise international state borders, despite having split the traditional Azawagh over several modern-day states; absolute accordance with the United Nations Charter; and a commitment by the MNLA to establish the "conditions for a durable peace" and create state institutions in accordance with a democratic constitution. Before "irrevocably" acclaiming the Independent State of Azawad, the document called on the executive committee, who would run the country in the interim period, to invite the international community to immediately recognise the new state in the interests of "justice and peace".

=== Reactions ===
The day before the declaration, the Foreign Ministry of Algeria said that an armed faction raided the Algerian consulate in the northeast kidnapping the consul and six staff members. Though Attaher called it "deplorable", he said the MNLA went along with the action in order not to result in deaths. The AFP also quoted a Malian military source as saying that to the best of Malian Army's intelligence "the MNLA is in charge of nothing at the moment... it is Iyad [Ag Ghaly] who is the strongest and he is with AQIM". His Ansar Dine said that it was "against rebellions. We are against independence. We are against revolutions not in the name of Islam." Some of the MLNA's leadership were also said to have been surprised by the declaration. Europe-based Hama Ag Sid'Ahmed, one of the spokesmen of the MNLA and the head of external relations, said: "I think it's premature – premature to speak of this right now, without a consultation and an understanding with some of the actors that are very active on the local level, and with which we need to work, and we need to find common objectives, common strategies."

==== Supranational bodies ====
- African Union: The AU rejected the UDI as "null and of no value whatsoever" and appealed to the rest of the world to ignore it. The AU's commission chairperson Jean Ping's office issued a statement that read he "calls on the international community as a whole to fully support this principled position of Africa".
- Economic Community of West African States: ECOWAS declared they would "take all necessary measures, including the use of force, to ensure the territorial integrity" of Mali. ECOWAS announced preparations for a 3,000 personnel intervention force to contain the rebels and protect the Constitution of Mali.
- European Union: The spokeswoman for the Representative for Foreign Affairs, Catherine Ashton, said that the EU respected Mali's territorial integrity. Richard Zinc, EU representative in Bamako, said that it was "out of question" that the EU would accept the declaration.

==== States ====
- Algeria: Prime Minister Ahmed Ouyahia said Azawad's northern neighbour country would never "accept questioning Mali's territorial integrity". However, he also rejected foreign intervention and called for a solution through dialogue.
- Canada: Chris Day, an aide to Foreign Minister John Baird, stated that Canada's position on Azawad's independence: "We’re absolutely not recognising this declaration. We are closely monitoring events on the ground."
- France: Defence Minister Gérard Longuet reacted by saying: "A unilateral declaration of independence which is not recognised by African states would not have any meaning for us." Foreign ministry spokesman Bernard Valero said the declaration was "null and void". He affirmed France's commitment to the "territorial integrity of Mali". On the other hand, Valero admitted that "the demands of the northern Tuareg population are old and for too long had not received adequate and necessary responses". France, however, also indicated it would offer military assistance to the ECOWAS force aimed at stabilising Mali and containing the rebels.
- Russia: In a statement the same day as the declaration, the presidential special envoy to Africa Mikhail Margelov rejected the formation of the state. "There are virtually no chances, this is undoubted, for [the] legitimization of a Tuareg state." "[The Sahelian countries, the ECOWAS, and the AU] do not need it. We stand unequivocally for the territorial integrity and restoration of the constitutional order in Mali."
- United States: Patrick Ventrell, a spokesman of the U.S. State Department stated: "We reject the MNLA's statement of independence and reiterate our call for the territorial integrity of Mali." The State Department also later expressed concern that the separation would "only exacerbate the grave problems challenging the Malian state".

==== Academia ====
Alessandra Giuffrida of the African Studies Department at the School of Oriental and African Studies said:

The MNLA is taking advantage of a new situation, i.e. the lack of a constitutional government in Bamako, which means the MNLA could claim independence of the Azawad, according to international law. This is a new fact which has never occurred before in the history of Tuareg secessionist rebellions. According to some international law experts, this actually gives the Tuareg some ground to fight legally for the independence of their state. [The international reactions reflect that] there is an interest in maintaining the status quo, an economic interest in the north of Mali after the discovery of mineral resources.

== See also ==
- Declaration of independence
