= Tuareg rebellion (2012) =

Early stage of the Mali War

2012 Tuareg rebellion
- Part of the Mali War, the Tuareg rebellions, and the Impact of the Arab Spring
- Map of areas captured by MNLA and Islamists
Date	16 January 2012 – 6 April 2012 (2 months and 3 weeks)
Location	Northern Mali
Status	MNLA/Ansar Dine victory: Malian president Amadou Toumani Touré is ousted by a coup d'état; MNLA and Ansar Dine take control of all Northern Mali territory; Conflict between the MNLA and Ansar Dine (the latter receiving support from AQIM and MOJWA).
Territorial changes	Independent state of Azawad declared by the MNLA and initially supported by Ansar Dine

Belligerents
Mali FLNA; Ganda Iso	Azawad; MNLA; AQIM; Ansar Dine; MOJWA

Commanders and leaders
(Mali) Amadou Toumani Touré (until March) (Mali) Sadio Gassama (until March) (Mali) El Hadj Ag Gamou (until March) (Mali) Amadou Sanogo (since March 2012); Mohamed Lamine Ould Sidatt (FLNA); Housseine Khoulam (FLNA)	(Azawad) Mahmoud Ag Aghaly (Azawad) Bilal Ag Acherif (Azawad) Moussa Ag Acharatoumane (Azawad) Mohamed Ag Najem Iyad Ag Ghali; Omar Ould Hamaha

Strength
7,000–7,800 regulars, 4,800 paramilitaries, 3,000 militia (overall military strength) ~500 (FLNA)	MNLA: 3,000 – 9,000 (MNLA claime) Ansar Dine: ~300

Casualties and losses
200+ killed or missing, 400 captured 1,000–1,600 defected Total: 1,000–1,500+ killed, captured or deserted	~165 killed (Malian sources)
- Displaced: ~100,000 refugees abroad 100,000+ internally displaced persons Total: ~250,000

The 2012 Tuareg rebellion was the early phase of the Mali War; from January to April 2012, a war was waged against the Malian government by rebels with the goal of attaining independence for the northern region of Mali, known as Azawad. It was led by the National Movement for the Liberation of Azawad (MNLA) and was part of a series of insurgencies by traditionally nomadic Tuaregs which date back at least to 1916. The MNLA was formed by former insurgents and a significant number of heavily armed Tuaregs who fought in the Libyan Civil War.

On 22 March, President Amadou Toumani Touré was ousted in a coup d'état over his handling of the crisis, a month before a presidential election was to have taken place. Mutineering soldiers, under the banner of the National Committee for the Restoration of Democracy and State, (CNRDR) suspended the constitution of Mali, although this move was reversed on 1 April.

The Islamist group Ansar Dine, too, began fighting the government in later stages of the conflict, claiming control of vast swathes of territory, albeit disputed by the MNLA. As a consequence of the instability following the coup, Northern Mali's three largest cities—Kidal, Gao and Timbuktu—were overrun by the rebels on three consecutive days. On 5 April, after the capture of Douentza, the MNLA said that it had accomplished its goals and called off its offensive. The following day, it proclaimed Azawad's independence from Mali.

After the end of hostilities with the Malian Army, however, Tuareg nationalists and Islamists struggled to reconcile their conflicting visions for the intended new state. On 27 June, Islamists from the Movement for Oneness and Jihad in West Africa (MOJWA) clashed with the MNLA in the Battle of Gao, wounding MNLA secretary-general Bilal Ag Acherif and taking control of the city. By 17 July, MOJWA and Ansar Dine had pushed the MNLA out of all the major cities.

On 14 February 2013 the MNLA renounced their claim of independence for Azawad and asked the Malian government to start negotiations on its future status.

== Background ==
For decades prior to the 2012 rebellion, Tuareg political leaders had asserted that the nomadic Tuareg people were marginalized and consequently impoverished in both Mali and Niger, and that mining projects had damaged important pastoral areas. Issues such as climate change and a rooted background of forced modernization onto the northern Nomadic areas of Mali have caused much tension between the Tuareg peoples and the Malian government. Tuareg separatist groups had staged previous unsuccessful rebellions in 1990 and in 2007. Many of the Tuaregs currently fighting in the rebellion have received training from Gaddafi's Islamic Legion during his tenure in Libya. Hence many of the combatants are experienced with a variety of warfare techniques that have posed major problems to the national governments of Mali and Niger.

The MNLA is an offshoot of a Tuareg political movement known as the National Movement for Azawad (MNA) prior to the 2012 insurgency. After the end of the Libyan Civil War, an influx of weaponry led to the arming of the Tuareg in their demand for independence for Azawad. Many of the returnees from Libya were said to have come back for financial reasons such as losing their savings, as well as due to the alleged racism of the NTC's fighters and militias. Another commentator described the US as a catalyst for the rebellion, citing the training of Tuareg rebels by the U.S. and the overthrow of Libya's government in 2011.

The strength of this uprising and the use of heavy weapons, which were not present in the previous conflicts, were said to have "surprised" Malian officials and observers. Such issues arise from an illicit weapons trade around the Sahel region that is linked to a variety of factors, including the funneling of weapons from Libya. Though dominated by Tuaregs, the MNLA claimed to represent other ethnic groups as well, and was reportedly joined by some Arab leaders. The MNLA's leader Bilal Ag Acherif said that the onus was in Mali to either give the Saharan peoples their self-determination or they would take it themselves.

Another Tuareg-dominated group, the Islamist Ansar Dine (Defenders of Faith), also fought against the government. However, unlike the MNLA it does not seek independence but rather the impositions of Sharia law across united Mali. The movement's leader Iyad Ag Ghali, who was part of the early 1990s rebellion, is believed to be linked to an offshoot of Al-Qaeda in the Islamic Maghreb (AQIM) that is led by his cousin Hamada Ag Hama.

Iyad Ag Ghali was also said to have been affiliated with Algeria's Département du Renseignement et de la Sécurité (DRS) since 2003. There were also reports of an Algerian military presence in the area on 20 December 2011. Though Mali said they were in coordination against AQIM, there were no reported attacks in the region at the time; the MNLA even complained that the Malian government had not done enough to fight AQIM. Locals believed that the presence was due to the MNLA's promise to root out AQIM which was involved in drug trafficking allegedly with the connivance of high-ranking officers and threatened to turn Mali into a narcostate.

== Course of the conflict ==
=== January 2012 ===
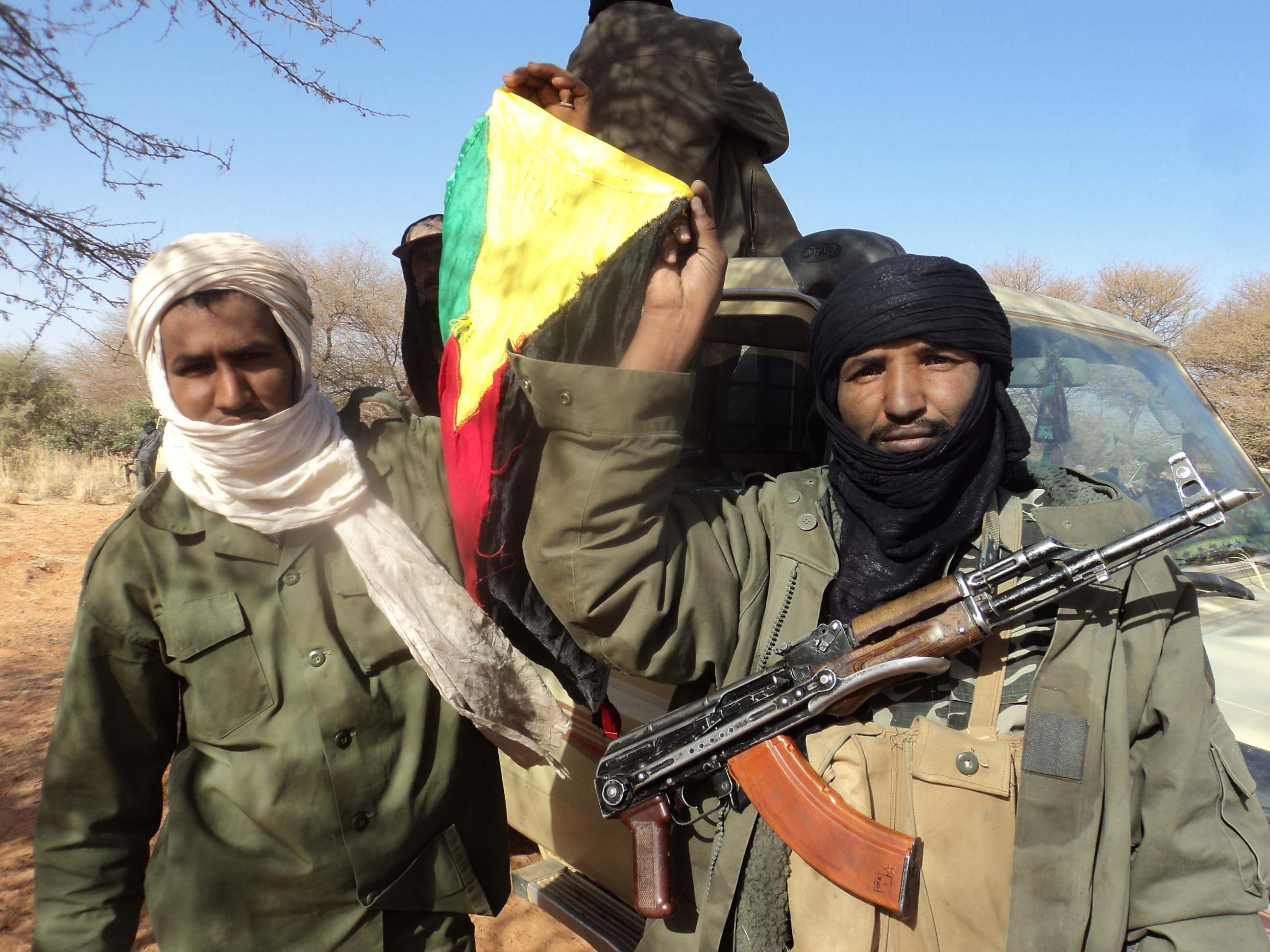
Azawad rebels in Mali, January 2012

According to Stratfor, the first attacks took place in Ménaka on 16 and 17 January, which left 2 Malian soldiers and 1 rebel dead. On 17 January attacks in Aguelhok and Tessalit were reported. The Mali government claimed to have regained control of all three towns the next day. On 21 January, a Malian convoy bringing army reinforcements and an arsenal of weapons to the garrison in recently liberated Aguelhok was ambushed near the village of In-Esmal, killing between 50 and 101 Malian soldiers including several captains. On 24 January the rebels retook Aguelhok after the Malian army ran out of ammunition. On 24 January, after the rebels captured Aguelhok the Islamists group AQIM summarily executed 97 Malian soldiers after they surrendered. The next day the Mali government once again recaptured the city.

On 26 January, rebels attacked and took control over the northern Mali towns of Andéramboukane and Léré after clashes with the military.

Stratfor also reported an attack on Niafunké on 31 January. The Agence France-Presse (AFP) reported that the rebels had captured Ménaka on 1 February.

On 13 February, the French radio station RFI reported statements by the Malian army that the MNLA had carried out executions of its soldiers on 24 January by slitting their throats or shooting them in the head. French Development Minister Henri de Raincourt mentioned that there had been about 60 deaths, while a Malian officer involved in burying the dead told the AFP that 97 soldiers had been killed. However, the evidence was unverified and partly denied as fabricated by the MNLA.

Mali launched air and land counter operations to take back seized territory, and President Touré then reorganized his senior commanders for the fight against the rebels.

=== February ===
In early February 2012, talks were held in Algiers between Malian Foreign Minister Soumeylou Boubeye Maiga and a Tuareg rebel group known as the 23 May 2006 Democratic Alliance for Change. The agreement called for a ceasefire and the opening of a dialogue. However, the MNLA rejected the agreement and said that they were not represented in these talks.

On 1 February, the MNLA took control of the city of Menaka when the Malian army operated what they called a tactical retreat. The violence in the north led to anti-rebellion protests which shut down Bamako, Mali's capital. Dozens of Malian soldiers were also killed in fighting in Aguelhok. Following the Bamako protests, the Interior minister took the place of the Defense minister. President Touré also called on the population to not attack any community after some Tuaregs' properties were attacked in the protests.

On 4 February, the rebels said that they were attacking the city of Kidal, while the Malian army said that their troops were firing heavy weapons to prevent the city from being attacked. As a result of the fighting, 3,500 civilians left the city to cross the border into Mauritania. Previously an estimated 10,000 civilians had fled to refugee camps in Niger after the fighting in Menaka and Andéramboukane. Official Malian sources reported that 20 Tuareg rebels have been killed by the army in the Timbuktu region, most of them being killed by helicopter gunships.

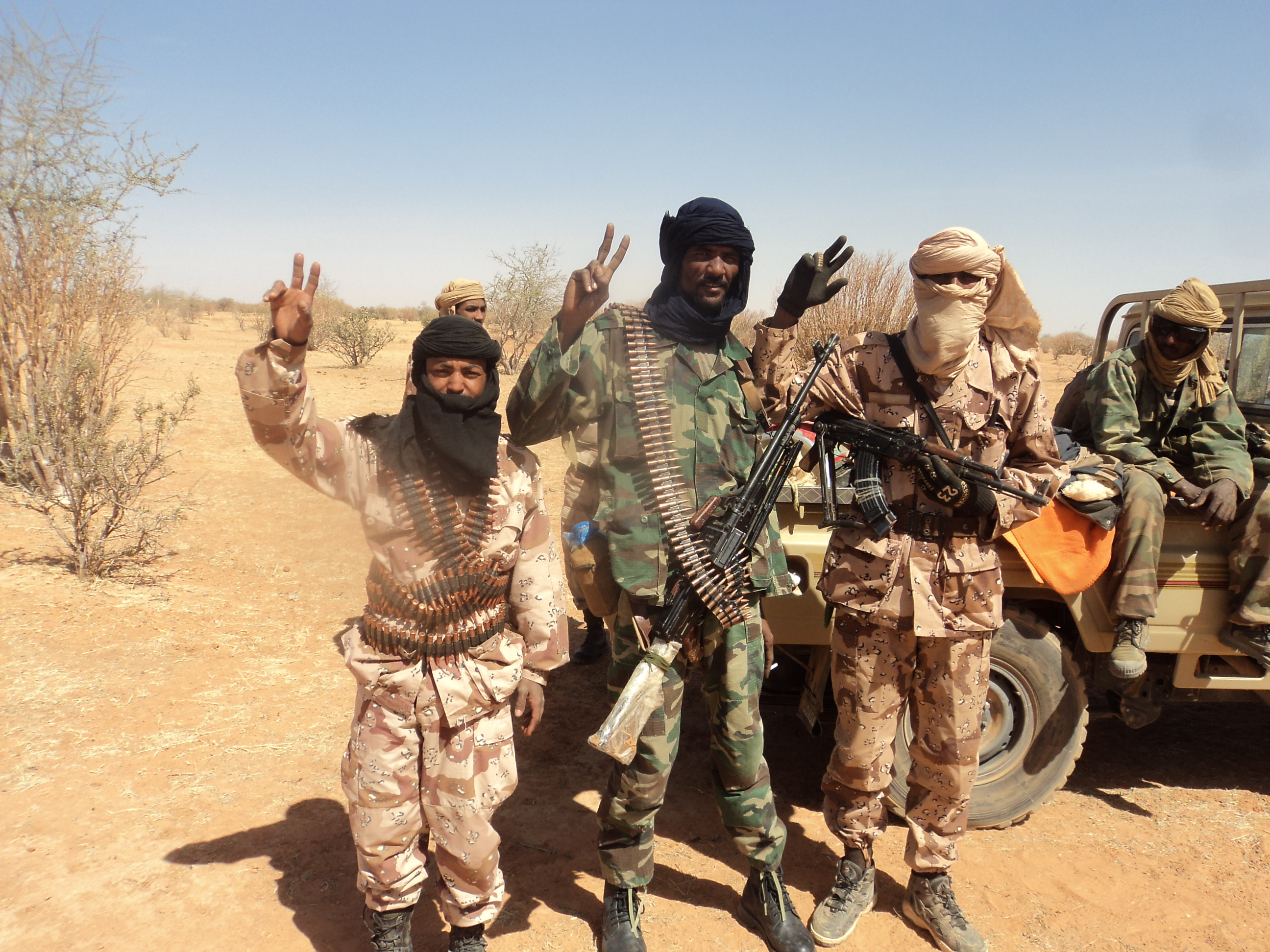
Tuareg rebels in 2012

On 8 February, the MNLA seized the Mali-Algeria border town of Tinzaouaten, forcing Malian soldiers to escape into Algeria. A rebel spokesman said that they were able to gain weapons and military vehicles found in the military camps of the city. The fight for the town killed one government soldier and one rebel. During the month, Niafunké was also captured and then lost again by the rebels.

On 23 February, Médecins Sans Frontières stated that a girl had been killed and ten other women and children injured when the Malian air force bombed a camp for IDPs in the north. The MNLA had repeatedly accused the Malian government of indiscriminate bombings by Malian attack helicopters piloted by foreign mercenaries.

=== March: until the coup d'état ===
On 4 March, a new round of fighting was reported near the formerly rebel-held town of Tessalit. The next day, three Malian army units gave up trying to lift the siege. The United States Air Force air-dropped supplies via a C-130 in support of the besieged Malian soldiers.

On 11 March, the MNLA re-took Tessalit and its airport after efforts by the government and its allies to re-supply the town failed, and the Malian military forces fled towards the border with Algeria. The MNLA announced that they had also captured several soldiers, as well as light and heavy weapons and armored vehicles. About 600 Tuareg fighters took part in the battle.

The rebels advanced to about 125 kilometers away from Timbuktu and their advance was unchecked when they entered without fighting in the towns of Diré and Goundam. A Malian military source said that as the cities were overrun the military planned to defend Niafunké. The French newspaper Libération also reported claims that the rebels controlled one third of Mali and that the Malian army was struggling to fight back. One of the three government helicopters manned by Ukrainian mercenaries had also broke down, while the two others were being kept to protect the south. Ansar Dine also claimed to have control of the Mali-Algeria border. It was reported that its leaders were planning a prisoner swap with the Malian government.

Ansar Dine’s military contribution was insignificant compared to that of the much larger MNLA. After the rebels entered the city, the MNLA would seize the military base, while the Islamist leader would enter the city, hoist his flag, and begin imposing Sharia law.

=== Coup d'état ===
On 21 March, Malian soldiers attacked defense minister Sadio Gassama, who was there to speak to them about the rebellion, at an army base near Bamako. The mutineers were dissatisfied with Touré's handling of the insurgency and the equipment they had received to fight the insurgents. Later that day, soldiers stormed the Presidential Palace, forcing Touré into hiding.

The next morning, Captain Amadou Sanogo, the chairman of the new National Committee for the Restoration of Democracy and State (CNRDR), made a television appearance in which he announced that the junta had suspended Mali's constitution and taken control of the nation. The CNRDR would serve as an interim regime until power could be returned to a new, democratically elected government.

The coup was "unanimously condemned" by the international community, including by the United Nations Security Council, the African Union, and the Economic Community of West African States (ECOWAS), which announced on 29 March that the CNRDR had 72 hours to relinquish control before landlocked Mali's borders would be closed by its neighbours, its assets would be frozen by the West African Economic and Monetary Union, and individuals in the CNRDR would get freezes on their assets and travel bans. ECOWAS and the African Union also suspended Mali. The U.S., the World Bank, and the African Development Bank suspended development aid funds in support of ECOWAS and the AU's reactions to the coup.

An agreement was mediated between the junta and ECOWAS negotiators on 6 April, in which both Sanogo and Touré would resign, sanctions would be lifted, the mutineers would be granted amnesty, and power would pass to National Assembly of Mali Speaker Dioncounda Traoré. Following Traoré's inauguration, he pledged to "wage a total and relentless war" on the Tuareg rebels unless they released their control of northern Malian cities.

=== Renewed offensives ===
As a result of the uncertainty following the coup, the rebels launched an offensive with the aim of capturing several towns and army camps abandoned by the Malian army. The MNLA took the town of Anefis without a fight, and the Malian Army reportedly abandoned their posts in several other northern towns as well. Though the offensive ostensibly included both the MNLA and Ansar Dine, according to Jeremy Keenan of the University of London's School of Oriental and African Studies, the latter group's contribution was slight: "What seems to happen is that when they move into a town, the MNLA take out the military base – not that there's much resistance – and Iyad [ag Aghaly] goes into town and puts up his flag and starts bossing everyone around about sharia law."

On 24 March, Amadou Sanogo, the leader of the National Committee for the Restoration of Democracy and State, announced his intention to seek peace talks with the MNLA. Negotiations reportedly took place in Niger. France's Henri de Raincourt later said that the MNLA were in talks with the government under the auspices of ECOWAS in Burkina Faso.

On 30 March, the rebels seized control of Kidal, the capital of the Kidal Region. Ansar Dine reportedly entered the town from the south after a day of heavy fighting. Responding to the loss, Sanogo called on Mali's neighbours to provide military aid to "save the civilian population and Mali's territorial integrity."

On the same day, the MNLA took control of the cities of Ansongo and Bourem in the Gao region, as the army said it was leaving its positions in both cities to support the defence of Gao, which was the headquarters of the Malian Army in the north. One administrator in Bourem was reportedly killed by the rebels. In the morning of 31 March, rebels entered Gao carrying their Azawad flag. The MOJWA also stated that it was part of the forces attacking and occupying Gao.

Though the Malian Army then used helicopters to respond to the attack, they abandoned their bases around Gao later in the day. The MNLA then took control of the city.

Both MNLA and Ansar Dine flags were reported around the city, leading to conflicting reports of which group was in control. The Associated Press reported accounts of a refugee that "signs of disunity" had begun to appear between the MNLA and Ansar Dine, including the removal of MNLA flags from Kidal. Of the city's two military camps, the MNLA took control of Camp 1, the Malian Army's former operational centre against the rebellion, while Ansar Dine took control of Camp 2.

A prison was reportedly opened, while public buildings were said to have been looted by civilians. The rebels were also alleged to have looted bank safes, while Ansar Dine had begun imposing Sharia. Shops in the city also closed. Gao MP Abdou Sidibe said that Gao's residents were not being allowed to leave the city.

Checkpoints were erected around Timbuktu as rebel forces encircled it with the MNLA saying that it sought to "dislodge Mali's remaining political and military administration" in the region. Malian soldiers with southern origins were reported to have started leaving Timbuktu, while Arab soldiers from the north were left to defend the city.

=== Capture of Timbuktu and Douentza ===
The next day, the rebels began attacking the outskirts of Timbuktu at dawn as reports indicated that government soldiers had deserted at least one of the bases. The attack occurred with the use of heavy arms and automatic weapons, which had been left by the Malian Army's deserters earlier. Al Jazeera reported the capture of Timbuktu the day an ECOWAS imposed 72-hour deadline to start returning to civilian rule was set to expire. The defence of the city was left mostly to local Arab militias as most of the Malian Army fled. The MNLA then took over Timbuktu without much fighting, celebrating its victory carrying the Azawad flag on pickup trucks around the city.

The MNLA then stated that it had succeeded in the "full liberation" of the Timbuktu region.

Kidal-based Colonel El Haji Ag Gamou of the Malian Army announced his defection to the MNLA with 500 of his troops. Ag Gamou and his men later fled to Niger, Ag Gamou stating that he had pretended to join the MNLA only to save his men. His regiment was disarmed by the Nigerien army and placed in a refugee camp, pushing the numbers of Malian soldiers who have sought refuge in Niger to more than 1,000.

On 6 April, it was reported that Douentza was also under the control of the MNLA, who announced that the city was last capture in the region they claimed. The speed of capturing the larger towns was read as a consequence of the instability in Bamako with the junta's hands bound between the rebels and the threat of economic sanctions by ECOWAS and others. With ECOWAS troops on stand-by for a first-ever intervention in a membership country, Sanogo said: "As of today we are committed to restore the 1992 constitution and all the institutions of the republic. However given the multi-dimensional crisis we face, we'll need a transition period to preserve the national unity. We will start talks with all political entities to put into place a transitional body that will oversee free and transparent elections in which we won't take part."

=== Declaration of independence and escalating tensions ===
After the fall of Douentza, amidst reports of tensions between secularists and Islamists in Timbuktu and Gao, the MNLA called for the international community to protect what they called Azawad. However, other African states and supranational bodies unanimously rejected the partition of Mali. The day before the UNSC had called for an end to hostilities. French Foreign Minister Alain Juppé said, "There will not be a military solution with the Tuaregs. There needs to be a political solution." Juppé referred to the MNLA as a credible interlocutor in the ongoing dialogue between Paris and the feuding factions in Mali, acknowledging it as distinct from Ansar Dine and Al Qaeda in the Islamic Maghreb, groups with which he ruled out negotiations.

On 6 April, stating that it had secured all of its desired territory, the MNLA declared independence from Mali. However, the declaration was rejected as invalid by the African Union and the European Union.

As of 8 April, the MNLA was holding 400 Malian soldiers captured during the conflict. The prisoners suffered from a lack of hygiene, and an MNLA commander said that neither the government of Bamako nor the humanitarian organizations cared about them.

On 15 May, Amnesty International released a report alleging that fighters with the MNLA and Ansar Dine were "running riot" in Mali's north, documenting instances of gang rape, extrajudicial executions, and the use of child soldiers by both Tuareg and Islamist groups.

== Human rights situation ==
On 4 April 2012, the United Nations High Commission for Refugees said that in addition to the roughly 200,000 displaced persons, up to 400 people a day were crossing the borders into Burkina Faso and Mauritania. The UNHCR's spokesperson Melissa Fleming said: "The north of the country is becoming more and more dangerous due to the proliferation of armed groups in the region. We are stepping up our assistance to Malian refugees across the Sahel region who face acute water and food shortages. We'd like to reiterate that UNHCR is committed to helping neighbouring countries and host communities which have been providing safety and shelter to the refugees despite these shortages and the difficult conditions."

The rebellion was described by BBC News as having adverse effects on Mali's impending food shortage, with more than 13 million Malians expected to be affected by drought. On 3 April, armed groups looted 2,354 tons of food from United Nations' World Food Programme's warehouses in Kidal, Gao and Timbuktu, causing the WFP to suspend its operations in northern Mali. Other targets of looting included hospitals, hotels, government offices, Oxfam offices and the offices and warehouses of other unnamed aid groups. The WFP also stated that 200,000 had so far fled the fighting, predicting that the number would rise. Ansar Dine were reported to have intervened against looters. The spokesman of Mali's junta Amadou Konare claimed that "women and girls have been kidnapped and raped by the new occupants who are laying down their own law." On 6 April, Amnesty International warned that Mali was "on the brink of a major humanitarian disaster".

Ansar Dine were also reported to have ransacked bars and establishments that served alcohol, while banning western music from being broadcast. Most hotels in the city were empty or closed, with the tourism industry in the doldrums. Similar reports of changing music on the radio to prayers chants was reported from Kidal, while in Gao, shops and churches were ransacked, while Ansar Dine were also reported to have put the head of a dead soldier on a spike at a military base they briefly held before the MNLA took it over.

=== Ethnic tensions ===
The conflict has strained the ethnic tolerance that Mali was once known for. The Tuaregs and Arabs who lived in Bamako and elsewhere in "South" Mali have been subjects of a rash of ethnic attacks by "black Malians" (as opposed to Mediterranean Arabs and racially mixed Tuaregs), despite many of them being hostile to Azawad separatism as well as the Islamists. In fact, many of these actually had only recently come to the "South", fleeing the violence in the North and ideological repression for not supporting Azawad separatism. By May, 60,000 people, mostly Tuaregs, had fled ethnic reprisals. One Tuareg interviewee, who had originally fled from the Northern town of Kidal to Bamako, and then to Mbera, said that "Some of them were saying the Tuareg people killed their relatives — and that now they must do the same to the Tuareg who are among them", and that the incident that prompted him to leave was watching policemen beat a Tuareg fellow policeman.

The Jamestown Foundation, a US-based think tank, challenged MNLA's statement that it represents all the ethnic groups of Azawad, stating that in practice, almost all of its members were Tuaregs, who saw in the rebellion a chance to establish a separate state for the Tuaregs of northern Mali, while other ethnic groups of the region—the Arabs/Moors as well as the various black groups (Fulani, Songhay, etc.)—were much less enthusiastic. By the late spring of 2012, they began forming their own, often ethnic-based, militias. Some Arabs/Moors opposed to the rebellion formed the National Liberation Front of Azawad, which held non-secessionist, non-Islamist views, and stated its intention to fight for "a return to peace and economic activity".

== Towns captured by rebels ==
Town	Date captured	Date lost	Date recaptured	Held by
Ménaka	16–17 January	18 January	1 February	MNLA
Aguelhok	17 January; 24 January	18 January; 25 January	?	?
Tessalit	17 January	18 January	11 March	MNLA
Andéramboukane	26 January			MNLA
Léré	26 January			MNLA
Tinzaouaten	8 February			MNLA
Niafunké	~February	February	?	?
Diré	~13 March (unsure if held)			?
Goundam	~13 March (unsure if held)			?
Anefis	23 March			MNLA
Kidal	30 March			Ansar Dine
Ansongo	30 March			Ansar Dine
Bourem	30 March			MNLA
Gao	31 March			MNLA/Ansar Dine/MOJWA
Timbuktu	1 April			MNLA/Ansar Dine
Ber	?			MNLA
Konna	10 January 2013			Ansar Dine.

== Reactions ==
=== States ===
ECOWAS warned the rebels and asked its member states to send logistical support to Mali, while also trying to negotiate a ceasefire. Mauritania denied working with Mali to quell the uprising; however, President Ould Abdel Aziz, along with Malian officials, claimed the MNLA worked with AQIM by citing the alleged massacre of soldiers. Algeria withdrew military advisors and suspended military aid to Mali at the end of January to increase pressure on the government as it also tried to mediate a resolution to the conflict.

On a 26 February visit to Bamako, French Foreign Minister Alain Juppé suggested the government of Mali negotiate with the MNLA; however, he was criticized for trying to legitimize a rebellion seen in the south as run by sectarian opportunists. After the coup and the advances by the rebels, the United States followed a warning that the region was becoming an Al Qaeda base with its support of ECOWAS' efforts as it was further worried by the rebel advances.

In early April, the AU said it had imposed targeted sanctions on the leaders of the rebel groups. The United Nations Security Council held an emergency session over the dual crisis on 4 April after France called for the meeting. Under-Secretary-General of the United Nations for political affairs B. Lynn Pascoe gave a brief to the UNSC, after which U.S. ambassador to the UN, Susan Rice said that an UN official had complained that the Malian government gave up ground to the rebels "without much of a fight." Juppé called for a collective response by the UNSC to the "Islamist threat" in the region.

=== Media ===
Amongst the media reactions to the uprising, Agence France-Presse was accused by Andy Morgan of Think Africa Press of uncritically accepting the government portrayal of the rebels as "armed bandits," "drug traffickers" and "Qaddafi mercenaries." The Los Angeles Times suggested that even without international recognition the gains by the rebels would be a de facto partitioning of Mali. The editorial board of The Washington Post called for NATO military intervention against the Tuareg. Social media amongst the Tuareg diaspora was reported to be euphoric at the imminent "liberation," while those in southern Mali were strongly against what they called "bandits" in the north who they said should be "killed". The Malian press was also quick to criticize the uprising. In late June, Reuters noted that in contrast to the Islamists who had "appropriated the uprising" from them, the Tuareg separatists were "regarded in the West as having some legitimate political grievances".

== See also ==
- Aftermath of the Libyan civil war
- List of modern conflicts in North Africa
- Libyan civil war (2011)
- Mali War
