= Battle of Aguelhok (2012) =

Battle in the Mali War

Coordinates: 19.4650°N 0.8550°E

- Part of the Tuareg rebellion (2012) and Mali War
- Battle of Aguelhok (2012) (Mali)
Date	17–25 January 2012 (1 week and 1 day)
Location	Aguelhok, Mali
Result	MNLA victory

Belligerents
Mali; Malian Army; 713th Nomad Company	(Azawad) MNLA; AQIM; Ansar Dine

Commanders and leaders
(Mali) Cpt. Sékou Traoré (executed)	(Azawad) Col. Ag Moussa Iyad Ag Ghaly; Abdelkrim al-Targui

Strength
200 soldiers	Unknown

Casualties and losses
153 soldiers killed	Dozens killed 40 vehicles destroyed (Malian Army claim)

The Battle of Aguelhok (also called the Aguelhok Massacre) occurred when rebels from the National Movement for the Liberation of Azawad (MNLA) and Islamists groups Ansar Dine and Al-Qaeda in the Islamic Maghreb attacked a Malian army garrison base in the town of Aguelhok, Kidal Region of Northern Mali on 17 January 2012, as part of the larger Tuareg rebellion to seize all government bases in the region.

The attack was led by Colonel Moussa Ag, a Malian army deserter to the MNLA. The military base was overrun on 25 January, after the Malian army garrison ran out of ammunition and surrendered.

== The battle ==
On January 18, the small town of Aguelhok was attacked by the rebels. The assault begins at 3.30 am, when the attackers cut the telephone network, while a group, hidden by the houses of the city progressed to the military camp without being seen. They found a favorable position on the roofs from where they could fire to the military camp. In addition, on the outskirts of the city, teachers and students of the Teacher Training Institute were taken prisoner, and they were used as human shields to protect themselves from possible air strikes. However, on the first day, the Malian army repelled the Tuareg and Islamist forces. According to the Malian Ministry of Defense, this first fight killed 35 attackers. The losses of the Malian army were one dead and seven wounded. Forces of Ansar Dine, were led by Abu Mohame, said Sheikh Aoussa, the second in command of the group. According to an intelligence officer in Mali, the attackers were commanded by Colonel deserter Ibah or M'Bam Ag Moussa, known as "Bamoussa". On January 20, a convoy of the Malian army that came to reinforce the Aguelhok garrison was repulsed during the Battle of In Emsal. After a few slight skirmishes on January 24, at five in the morning, the rebels launched a second assault. Short of ammunition, the Malian soldiers surrendered. But they were executed the same day. The next day, the barracks were bombed by the Malian airforce, and from Kidal a new Malian army group commanded by Colonel Ag Gamou headed to Aguelhok, supported by Mil Mi-24 helicopters. The rebels withdraw and abandoned the city which was taken without a fight by the Malian soldiers. Forty-one soldiers were found in mass graves after the battle.

== Executions ==
Malian military spokesmen Colonel Idriss Traoré later commented that 97 captured soldiers were killed. Later it became known that the 100 captured Malian soldiers were summarily executed by rebels using "al-Qaeda style" tactics. Nine soldiers spared during the massacre were later let free on a vow to never fight "Sharia Islam".

Prior to its formal investigation in Mali, the International Criminal Court stated that,

"Based on the information available, the Aguelhok incident appears grave enough to justify further action by the Court."

The Malian president Amadou Toumani Toure later commented during a conference on 15 March about the incident,

"The garrison had no more ammunition and it was impossible to transport reinforcements. The soldiers who fought valiantly were captured. When the MNLA left the scene we discovered a tragedy. Seventy of our young people were lined up on the floor. Blacks had their wrists tied behind his back. They were killed by bullets fired at close range in the head. Those who had white skin, Arabs and Tuaregs slaughtered and gutted. It is a war crime. I am surprised by the silence of international organizations on these atrocities. What does the International Criminal Court do? Nothing. A commission of inquiry was tasked to submit a dossier to the Malian justice. MNLA who claimed victory bears a heavy responsibility, but we know that the largest contingent of the group was composed primarily of people of AQIM. "

France and other world countries denounced the incident as "absolutely atrocious and unacceptable violence".

Toure later remarked in an interview with the French newspaper Le Figaro;

“les soldats qui se sont battus vaillamment ont été faits prisonniers”. Il poursuit “lorsque le MNLA a quitté les lieux nous avons découvert une tragédie. Les noirs avaient les poignets ligotés dans le dos. Ils ont été abattus par des balles tirées à bout portant dans la tête. Ceux qui avaient la peau blanche, les Arabes et les Touaregs, ont été égorgés et souvent éventrés. C’est un crime de guerre”

== Aftermath ==
On 1 February, violence in the north of the country led to anti-rebellion protests which shut down Bamako, Mali's capital. Following the Bamako protests, the interior minister took the place of the defense minister. President Touré also called on the population to not attack any community after some Tuaregs' properties were attacked in the protests.
