= Popular Liberation Front of Azawad =

The Popular Liberation Front of Azawad (in French: Front Populaire de Libération de l'Azawad) was one of several militant rebel groups active during the Tuareg Rebellion in northern Mali from 1990 to 1995.

In January 1991, the government of Mali met with two of the main rebel groups in Tamanrasset to negotiate a cease-fire. The FPLA, however, opposed the Tamanrasset Accords and continued their attacks. On March 26, 1991, the government of Mali was overthrown in a military coup and a multi-party democracy was established. In December 1991, FPLA joined the United Movements and Fronts of Azawad (MFUA), which unitedly signed the National Pact peace treaty. Further agreements between the rebel groups and the government were signed in 1992 and 1995, effectively ending the rebellion.

== See also ==
- Tuareg Rebellion (1990–1995)
