= Bilal Ag Acherif =

Tuareg military leader (born 1977)

Amghar Bilal Ag Acherif
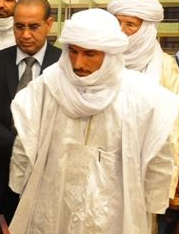
- Acherif in 2012

President of the Transitional Council of the State of Azawad
- In office 6 April 2012 – 12 July 2012
- Vice President: Mahamadou Djeri Maïga
- Preceded by: Position established
- Succeeded by: Position abolished

General Secretary of the MNLA
- In office October 2011 – November 2024
- Preceded by: Position established
- Succeeded by: Position abolished

Personal details
- Born: 1977 (age 48–49) Kidal Region, Mali

Bilal Ag Acherif (born 1977) is a Malian Tuareg military leader who is a senior leader of the Azawad Liberation Front (FLA) since 2024. He previously served as the secretary-general of the National Movement for the Liberation of Azawad (MNLA) from 2011 to 2024 when the MNLA merged into ALF.

Born in the Kidal Region of northern Mali, Acherif studied political science in Libya in the 1990s. He returned to Mali in 2010 and took part in activities against President Amadou Toumani Touré and founded the MNLA. He played a major role in the Tuareg rebellion, which overthrew Touré and started the Mali War. In April 2012, Acherif declared the independence of Azawad and briefly served as its president until July 2012 when the Malian Armed Forces recaptured many cities and state of Azawad collapsed while Acherif fled to an undisclosed location. In 2014, Bilal Ag Acherif took over the presidency of the Coordination of Azawad Movements (CMA). In November 2024, he became the leader of the ALF.

== Biography ==
=== Pre-presidency ===
He was born to a Tuareg family in the Kidal Region of Mali in 1977. He went to Libya in the 1990s to study political science, returning to Mali in 2010.

=== Interim presidency ===
On 6 April 2012, he posted a statement to its website in which he declared the independence of Azawad from Mali. On May 26, 2012 he made a pact with Ansar Dine, an Islamic organization, in which they would together form an Islamic state. Azawad was supported by Ansar Dine from 2012 to 2017. It was not recognized by any nation or entity.

On 26 June 2012, he was wounded in clashes between MNLA fighters and the Islamist Movement for Oneness and Jihad in West Africa during the northern Mali conflict. According to an MNLA spokesperson, he was taken to Burkina Faso for medical care.

=== Post-presidency ===
In the months after his presidency he met with Cyril Vainer in Paris to discuss the Mali War.

In 2014, Bilal Ag Acherif took over the presidency of the Coordination of Azawad Movements (CMA), until being succeeded by Alghabass Ag Intalla on December 16, 2016.

In November 2024, he merged his group into the Azawad Liberation Front.
