= Tuareg rebellion =

Tuareg rebellion may refer to various armed conflicts involving the Tuareg people of the northern parts of Mali and Niger and the western parts of Libya:

- Kaocen revolt (1916–1917)
- Tuareg rebellion (1962–1964)
- Tuareg rebellion (1990–1995)
- 2006 Tuareg rebellion
- Tuareg rebellion (2007–2009)
- Tuareg rebellion (2012)
- Tuareg involvement in the Mali War (2012–)
- Tuareg involvement in the Second Libyan Civil War (2014–2020)

== See also ==
- Ansar Dine
- Movement for Oneness and Jihad in West Africa
- Tuareg militias of Ghat
