= Azawad =

Tuareg name for a territory in northern Mali

Coordinates: 16°16′N 0°03′W

Independent State of Azawad: ⴰⵣⴰⵓⴰⴷ (Tamashek); دولة أزواد المستقلة (Arabic)
- 2012–2013
- Flag

- Azawad, as claimed by the MNLA, in green, with southern Mali in dark grey
- Status: Unrecognized state
- Capital: Timbuktu (proclaimed); Gao (provisional)
- Largest city: Gao
- Common languages: French; Fula; Hassaniya Arabic; Songhay; Tamasheq
- Demonyms: Azawadi; Azawadian
- President
  - 2012: Bilal Ag Acherif
- Vice President
  - 2012: Mahamadou Djeri Maïga
- Historical era: Northern Mali conflict
  - Declaration of independence: 6 April 2012
  - Battle of Gao and Fall of Timbuktu: 26–29 June 2012
  - Fall of Ansongo: 12 July 2012
  - Ouagadougou Agreements: 18 June 2013
Preceded by	Succeeded by
Mali	Mali

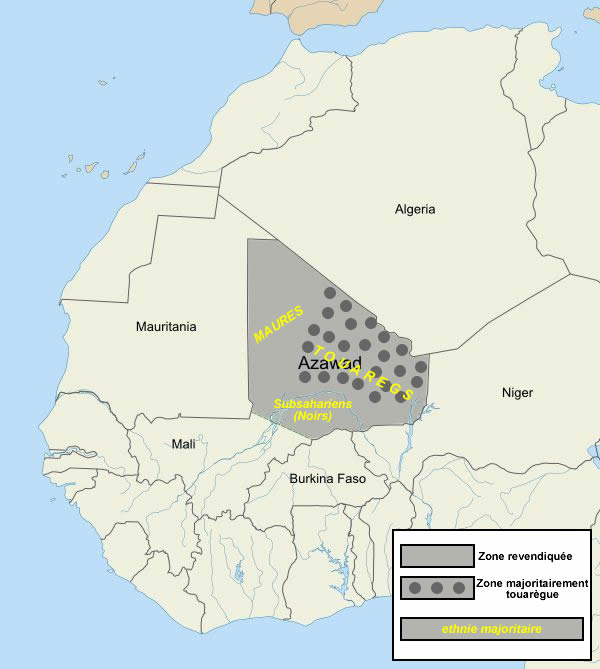
Map of Azawad, as claimed by the MNLA. Dark grey dots indicate regions with a Tuareg majority. The west is mainly inhabited by Maures, and the south by sub-Saharan peoples.

Azawad (Tuareg: ⴰⵣⴰⵓⴰⴷ; Arabic: أزواد), officially known as the Independent State of Azawad, was a short-lived unrecognised state lasting from 2012 to 2013. The National Movement for the Liberation of Azawad (MNLA) unilaterally declared independence in 2012, after a Tuareg rebellion drove the Malian Armed Forces away from the region.

Azawad, as claimed by the MNLA, comprised the Malian regions of Timbuktu (including present-day Taoudénit), Kidal, Gao (including present-day Ménaka), as well as a part of Mopti Region, encompassing about 60 percent of Mali's total land area. Gao is its largest city and served as the temporary capital, while Timbuktu is the second-largest city, and was intended to be the capital by the independence forces.

On 6 April 2012, in a statement posted to its website, the MNLA declared "irrevocably" the independence of Azawad from Mali. In Gao on the same day, Bilal Ag Acherif, the secretary-general of the MNLA, signed the Azawadian declaration of independence, which also declared the MNLA as the interim administrators of Azawad until a "national authority" could be formed. Acherif subsequently became "president of the transitional council". The proclamations were never recognised by any foreign entity, and the MNLA's claim to have de facto control of the Azawad region was disputed by both the Malian government and Islamist insurgent groups in the Sahara. At this time, a rift was developing with the Islamists. The Economic Community of West African States, which refused to recognise Azawad and called the declaration of its independence "null and void", warned it could send troops into the disputed region in support of the Malian claim.

Tuareg military leader Moussa Ag Acharatoumane, affiliated with the Movement for the Salvation of Azawad, claimed that jihadi groups, and the Ansar Dine in particular, had been in the region of Azawad for 10 years before the circumstances which led to the Azawadian declaration of independence. Locals had heard of their extremist views in respect to sharia then subsequently distanced themselves from the jihadis. Ag Acharatoumane further asserted that the death of Muammar Gaddafi destabilised the political landscape for Sahelians from Mali and Niger to such a degree that it was described as "disastrous". The Tuareg rebels allegedly went into a "survival mode" for five years after his death which were fraught with socio-political and socioeconomic crises. Disorganised and unaware of moderate militias, some joined jihadi groups but left when acquainted with better options; they aimed to join movements that were "good" in nature and organised for humanitarian causes for the betterment of Azawad. When asked about the speculated alliance between the MNLA and the Ansar Dine, Ag Acharatoumane said he "personally did not know of the alliance" and referred back to the distance Azawadian locals kept from them.

On 14 February 2013, the MNLA renounced its claim of independence for Azawad and asked the Malian government to start negotiations on its future status. The MNLA ended the ceasefire in September of the same year after government forces reportedly opened fire on unarmed protesters.

== Name ==
According to the Scottish explorer and scientist Robert Brown, Azawad is an Arabic corruption of the Berber word Azawagh, referring to a dry river basin that covers western Niger, northeastern Mali, and southern Algeria. The name translates to "land of transhumance".

On 6 April 2012, in a statement posted to its website, the MNLA declared the independence of Azawad from Mali. In this Azawad Declaration of Independence, the name Independent State of Azawad was used (French: État indépendant de l'Azawad, Arabic: دولة أزواد المستقلة, Dawlat Azawād al-Mustaqillah). On 26 May, the MNLA and its former co-belligerent Ansar Dine announced a pact in which they would merge to form an Islamist state; according to the media the new long name of Azawad was used in this pact. But this new name is not clear – sources list several variants of it: the Islamic Republic of Azawad (French: République islamique de l'Azawad), the Islamic State of Azawad (French: État islamique de l'Azawad), and the Republic of Azawad. Azawad authorities did not officially confirm any change of name. Later reports indicated the MNLA had decided to withdraw from the pact with Ansar Dine. In a new statement, dated on 9 June, the MNLA used the name State of Azawad (French: État de l'Azawad). The MNLA produced a list of the 28 members of the Transitional Council of the State of Azawad (French: Conseil de transition de l'État de l'Azawad, CTEA) serving as a provisional government with President Bilal Ag Acherif to manage the new State of Azawad.

== History ==
After European powers formalized the scramble for Africa in the Berlin Conference, the French assumed control of the land between the 14th meridian and Miltou, South-West Chad, bounded in the south by a line running from Say, Niger to Baroua. Although the Azawad region was French in name, the principle of effectivity required France to hold power in those areas assigned, e.g. by signing agreements with local chiefs, setting up a government, and making use of the area economically, before the claim would be definitive. On 15 December 1893, Timbuktu, by then long past its prime, was annexed by a small group of French soldiers, led by Lieutenant Gaston Boiteux. The region became part of French Sudan (Soudan Français), a colony of France. The colony was reorganised and the name changed several times during the French colonial period. In 1899 the French Sudan was subdivided and the Azawad became part of Upper Senegal and Middle Niger (Haut-Sénégal et Moyen Niger). In 1902 it was renamed as Senegambia and Niger (Sénégambie et Niger), and in 1904 this was changed again to Upper Senegal and Niger (Haut-Sénégal et Niger). This name was used until 1920 when it became French Sudan again.

=== Under Malian rule ===
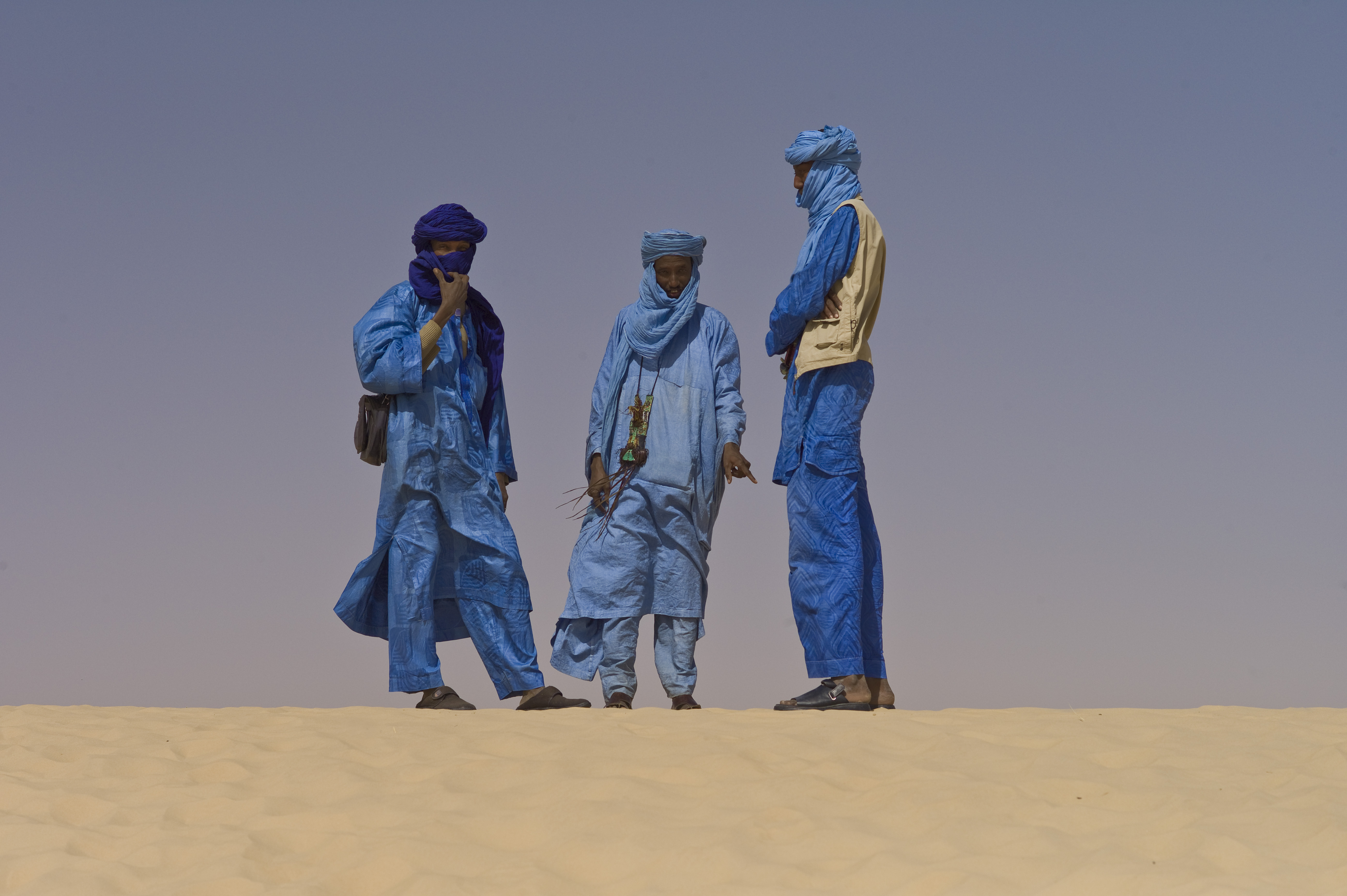
Tuaregs at the January 2012 Festival au Désert in Timbuktu, just before the MNLA launched the Tuareg rebellion later in the same month

French Sudan became the autonomous state of Mali within the French Community in 1958, and Mali became independent from France in 1960. Four major Tuareg rebellions took place against Malian rule: the First Tuareg Rebellion (1962–64), the rebellion of 1990–1995, the rebellion of 2007–2009, and a 2012 rebellion.

In the early twenty-first century, the region became notorious for banditry and drug smuggling. The area has been reported to contain great potential mineral wealth, including petroleum and uranium.

=== Independence War ===
On 17 January 2012, the MNLA announced the start of an insurrection in Northern Mali against central government, declaring that it "will continue so long as Bamako does not recognise this territory as a separate entity". After the first attack took place in the town of Ménaka, further fighting was reported in different parts of the north, including Aguelhok, Tessalit, Léré, and Niafunké. Contradictory reports on military gains and losses from Malian military, were strongly denied by the Malian government. On 24 January, the MNLA won control of the town of Aguelhok, killing around 160 Malian soldiers and capturing dozens of heavy weapons and military vehicles. In March 2012, the MNLA and Ansar Dine took control of the regional capitals of Kidal and Gao along with their military bases. On 1 April, Timbuktu was captured. After the seizure of Timbuktu on 1 April, the MNLA gained effective control of most of the territory they claim for an independent Azawad. In a statement released on the occasion, the MNLA invited all Tuaregs abroad to return home and join in constructing institutions in the new state.

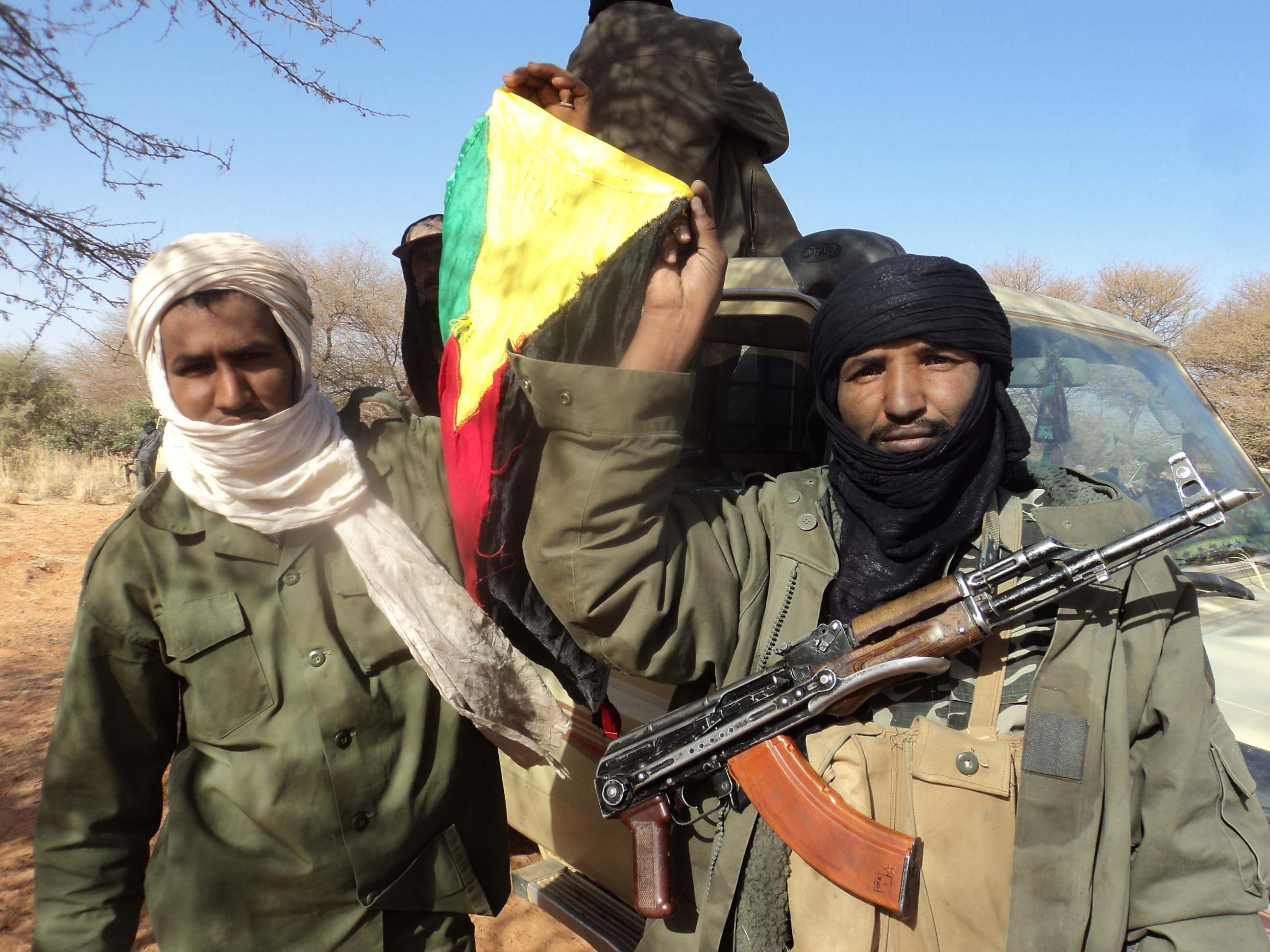
Tuareg separatist rebels in Mali, January 2012

=== Unilateral declaration of independence ===
The National Movement for the Liberation of Azawad (MNLA) declared Northern Mali an independent state that they named Azawad on 6 April 2012 and pledged to draft a constitution establishing it as a democracy. Their statement acknowledged the United Nations charter and said the new state would uphold its principles.

In an interview with France 24, an MNLA spokesman declared the independence of Azawad:

Mali is an anarchic state. Therefore, we have gathered a national liberation movement to put in an army capable of securing our land and an executive office capable of forming democratic institutions. We declare the independence of Azawad from this day on.

— Moussa Ag Assarid, MLNA spokesman, 6 April 2012

In the same interview, Assarid promised that they would respect the colonial frontiers that separate the region from its neighbours; he insisted that Azawad's declaration of independence had international legality.

No foreign entity recognised Azawad. The MNLA's declaration was immediately rejected by the African Union, who declared it "null and no value whatsoever". The French Foreign Ministry said it would not recognise the unilateral partition of Mali, but it called for negotiations between the two entities to address "the demands of the northern Tuareg population [which] are old and for too long had not received adequate and necessary responses". The United States also rejected the declaration of independence.

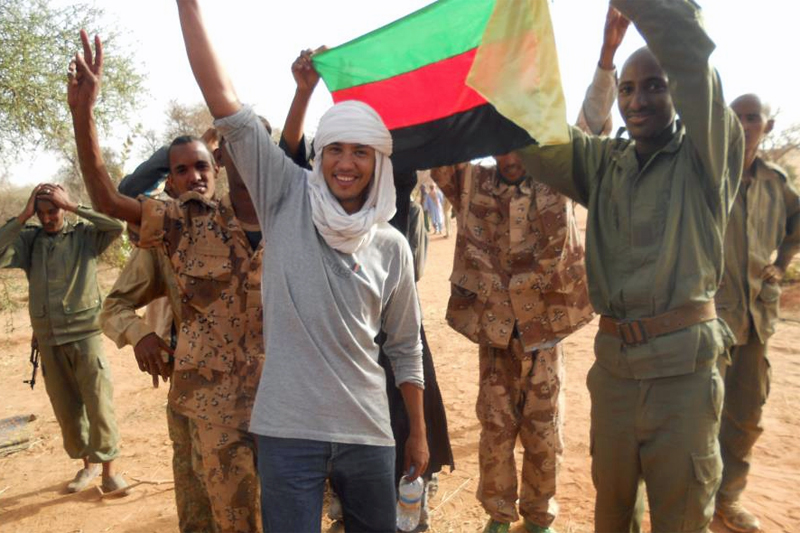
Azawad separatists, December 2012

The MNLA was estimated to have up to 3,000 soldiers. ECOWAS declared Azawad "null and void", and said that Mali is "one and [an] indivisible entity". ECOWAS said that it would use force, if necessary, to put down the rebellion. The French government indicated it could provide logistical support.

On 26 May, the MNLA and its former co-belligerent Ansar Dine announced a pact to merge to form an Islamist state. Later reports indicated the MNLA withdrew from the pact, distancing itself from Ansar Dine. MNLA and Ansar Dine continued to clash, culminating in the Battle of Gao and Timbuktu on 27 June, in which the Islamist groups Movement for Oneness and Jihad in West Africa and Ansar Dine took control of Gao, driving out the MNLA. The following day, Ansar Dine announced that it was in control of Timbuktu and Kidal, the three biggest cities of northern Mali. Ansar Dine continued its offensive against MNLA positions and overran all remaining MNLA held towns by 12 July with the fall of Ansongo.

In December 2012, the MNLA agreed on Mali's national unity and territorial integrity in talks with both the central government and Ansar Dine.

=== Peace deal ===
A peace deal was reached in June 2013 between the MNLA and the Malian government. It gave the military lease over Tuareg rebel-held land and provided Tuareg with greater autonomy which was requested after the MNLA revoked their Independence claim. This allowed the northern part of the country to participate in the Malian presidential elections the same month. The ceasefire didn't last long before Malian troops clashed with rebels in skirmishes.

=== 2017 ===
There was a referendum scheduled for 2017 on gaining autonomy and renaming the northern regions into "Azawad". However, Mali's President Ibrahim Boubacar Keita shelved the plans for the referendum on constitutional reforms that were met with opposition and ignited regular street protests.

== Geography ==
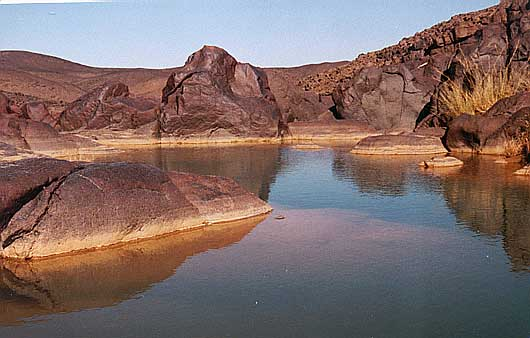
A guelta in Adrar des Ifoghas

Azawad has a desert or semi-desert climate. Reuters wrote about the terrain: "Much of the land is the Sahara Desert at its most inhospitable: rock, sand dunes and dust scored by shifting tracks." Some definitions of Azawad also include parts of northern Niger and southern Algeria, adjacent areas to the south and the north though in its declaration of independence, the MNLA did not advance territorial claims on those areas.

Traditionally, Azawad has referred to the sandplains north of Timbuktu. In geological terms, it is a mosaic of river, swamp, lake, and wind-borne deposits, while aeolian processes have proven the most imprinting.

About 6500 BC, Azawad was a 90,000-square kilometres marshy and lake basin. The area of today's Timbuktu was likely once flooded. In the deeper parts of Azawad, there were large lakes, partly recharged by rainfall, partly by exposed groundwater. Seasonal lakes and creeks were fed by overflow of the Niger River. The annual Niger flood was diffused throughout the Azawad by a network of palaeochannels spread out over an area of 180 by 130 kilometres. The most important of these paleochannels is the Wadi el-Ahmar, which is 1 200 metres wide at its southern end, at the Niger bend, and winds 70 to 100 kilometres northward. These long interdunal indentations that are framed by Pleistocene longitudinal dunes, characterise the present landscape.

== Politics ==
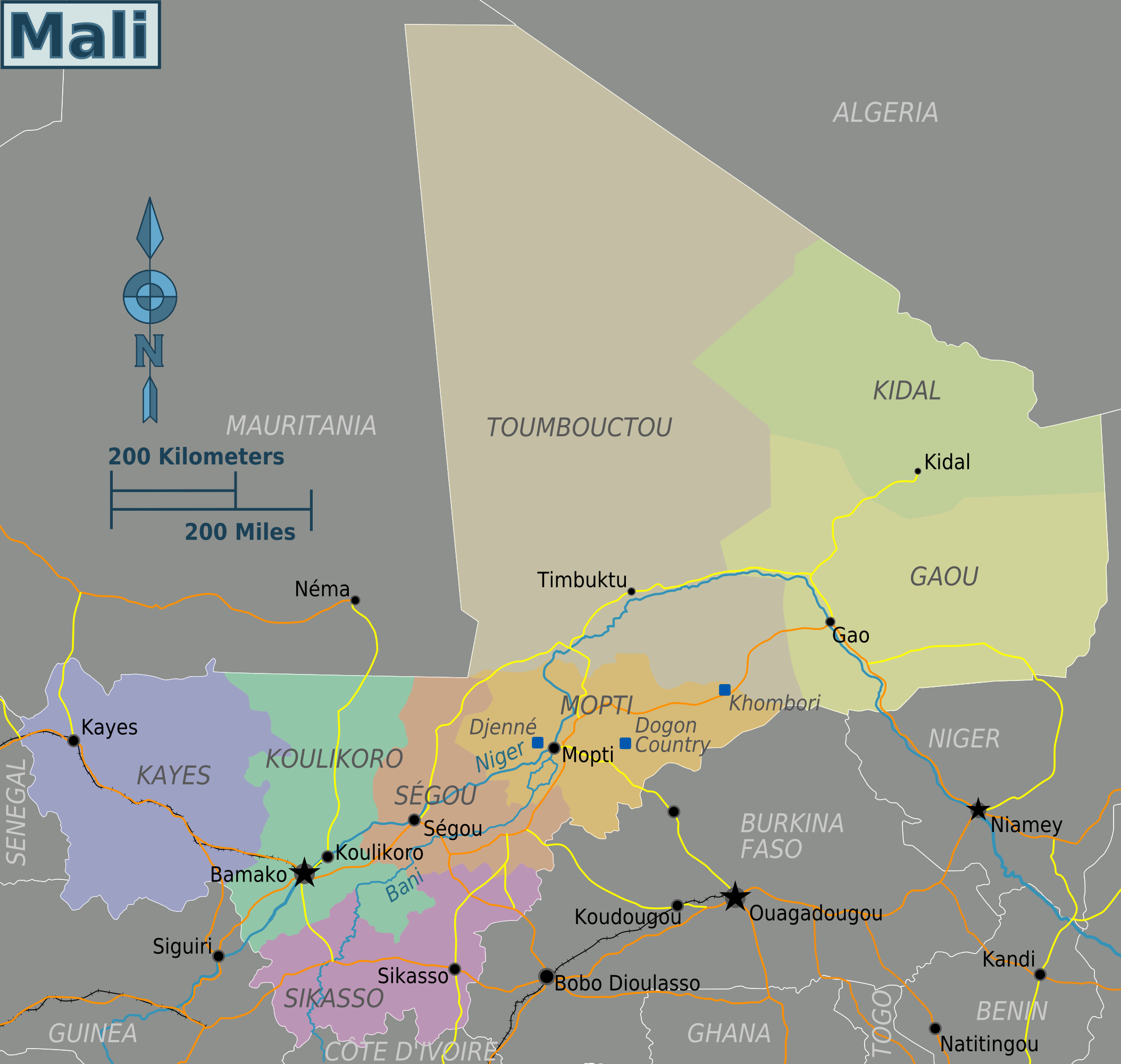
The MNLA declared that Azawad consisted of the regions of Gao, Kidal, and Timbuktu, as well as the north-east half of the Mopti Region.

The MNLA in its declaration of independence announced the first political institutions of the state of Azawad. It included:

- An executive committee, directed by Mahmoud Ag Aghaly.
- A revolutionary council, directed by Abdelkrim Ag Tahar.
- A consultative council, directed by Mahamed Ag Tahadou.
- The general staff of the Liberation Army, directed by Mohamed Ag Najem.

Although the MNLA claimed responsibility for managing the country "until the appointment of a national authority" in their declaration of independence, it has acknowledged the presence of rival armed groups in the region, including Islamist fighters under Ansar Dine, the Movement for Oneness and Jihad in West Africa, and Al Qaeda in the Islamic Maghreb (AQIM). The MNLA did not establish a formal government, though it pledged to draft a constitution establishing Azawad as a democracy. The main government building is called the Palace of Azawad by the MNLA. It is a heavily guarded building in central Gao that served as the office of the Gao Region's governor prior to the rebellion.

The military wing of Ansar Dine rejected the MNLA's declaration of independence hours after it was issued. Ansar Dine vowed to establish Islamic sharia law over all of Mali. At a conference, the Azawadis voiced their disapproval of radical Islamic groups, and asked all foreign fighters to disarm and leave the country.

According to a Chatham House Africa expert, Mali was not to be considered "definitively partitioned". The peoples who constitute a major share of the population of northern Mali, such as Songhai and Fulani, considered themselves to be Malian and had no interest in a separate Tuareg-dominated state. On the day of the declaration of independence, about 200 Malian northerners staged a rally in Bamako, declaring their rejection of the partition and their willingness to fight to drive out the rebels. A day later, 2,000 protesters joined a new rally against separatism.

According to Ramtane Lamamra, the African Union's peace and security commissioner, the African Union has discussed sending a military force to reunify Mali. He said that negotiations with terrorists had been ruled out, but negotiations with other armed factions were still open.

=== Administrative divisions ===
Azawad, as proclaimed by the MNLA, includes the regions of Gao, Timbuktu, Kidal, and the northeast half of Mopti; until 1991, when the new Kidal Region was created, it formed the northern portion of Gao Region. As such, it includes the three biggest cities of Timbuktu, Gao and Kidal.

== Demographics ==
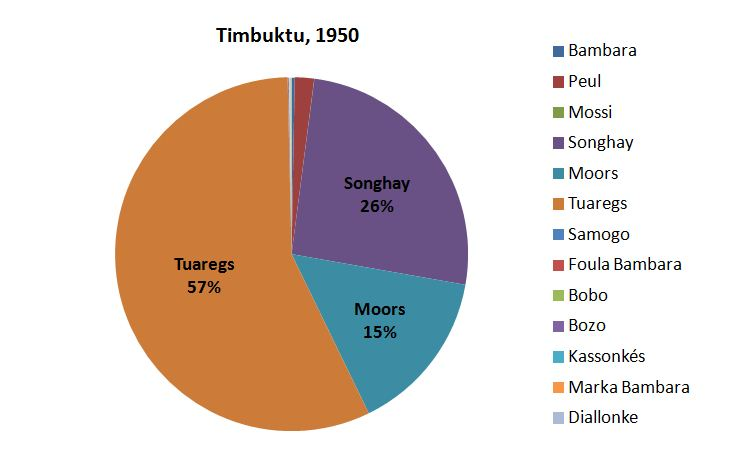
Timbuktu census in 1950

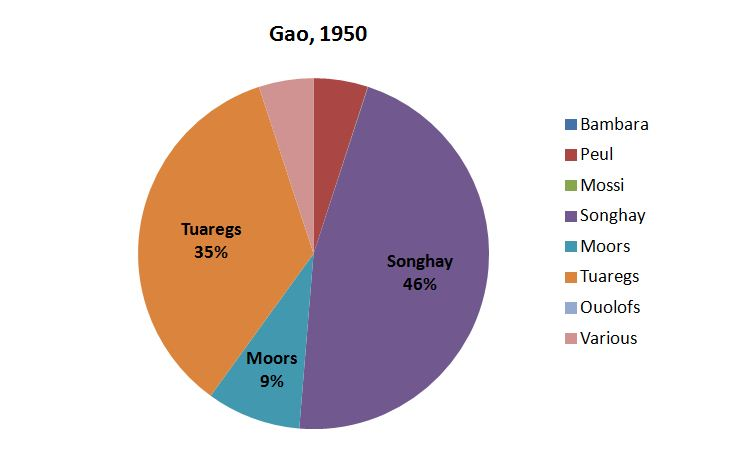
Gao (which includes Kidal) census in 1950

Timbuktu census in 2009

Gao census in 2009

Kidal census in 2009

Northern Mali has a population density of 1.5 people per square kilometre. The Malian regions claimed by Azawad are listed hereafter (apart from the portion of Mopti Region claimed and occupied by the MNLA). The population figures are from the 2009 census of Mali, taken before Azawadian independence was proclaimed. Since the start of the Tuareg rebellion in January 2012, an estimated 250,000 former inhabitants have fled the territory.

Region name	Area (km^{2})	Population
Gao	170,572	544,120
Kidal	151,430	67,638
Timbuktu	497,926	681,691

=== Ethnic groups ===
The area was traditionally inhabited by the settled Songhai, and the nomadic Tuareg, Arabs, and Fulas (Fula: Fulɓe; French: Peul). The ethnic composition of the regions in 1950 (at that time, Kidal Region was a part of Gao Region) and in 2009 is shown in the adjacent diagrams.

=== Languages ===
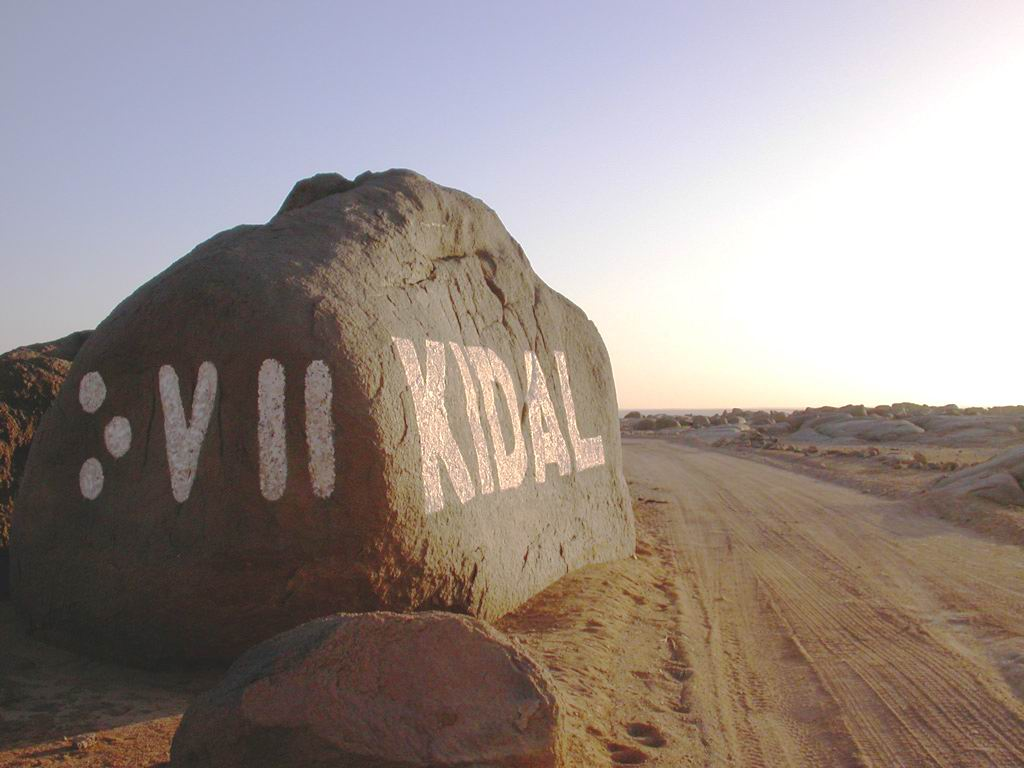
Bilingual traffic sign (left side in Tifinagh: "kdl")

The languages of Northern Mali include Hassaniya Arabic, Fulfulde and Songhay, Tamashek. French, though not spoken natively, is widely used as a lingua franca, as well as negotiations with the government of Mali and foreign affairs.

=== Religion ===
Most are Muslims, of the Sunni orientations. Most popular in the Tuareg movement and northern Mali as a whole is the Maliki branch of Sunnism, in which traditional opinions and analogical reasoning by later Muslim scholars are often used instead of a strict reliance on hadith as a basis for legal judgment.

Ansar Dine follows the Salafi branch of Sunni Islam. They strongly object to praying around the graves of Malikite 'holymen', and burned down an ancient Sufi shrine in Timbuktu, which had been listed as a UNESCO World Heritage Site.

Most of the 300 Christians who formerly lived in Timbuktu have fled to the South since the rebels captured the town on 2 April 2012.

=== Humanitarian situation ===
The people living in the central and northern Sahelian and Sahelo-Saharan areas of Mali are the country's poorest, according to an International Fund for Agricultural Development report. Most are pastoralists and farmers practicing subsistence agriculture on dry land with poor and increasingly degraded soils. The northern part of Mali suffers from a critical shortage of food and lack of health care. Starvation has prompted about 200,000 inhabitants to leave the region.

Refugees in the 92,000-person refugee camp at Mbera, Mauritania, described the Islamists as "intent on imposing an Islam of lash and gun on Malian Muslims." The Islamists in Timbuktu have destroyed about a half-dozen historic above-ground tombs of revered holy men, proclaiming the tombs contrary to Shariah. One refugee in the camp spoke of encountering Afghans, Pakistanis and Nigerians among the invading forces.

== See also ==
- Arab Islamic Front of Azawad
- Ansar Dine
- Arab Movement of Azawad
- Azawadian declaration of independence
- Jama'at Nasr al-Islam wal Muslimin
- Niger Movement for Justice
- Northern Mali conflict
- Popular Movement for the Liberation of Azawad
- Tuareg rebellion (1962–1964)
- Tuareg rebellion (1990–1995)
- Tuareg rebellion (2007–2009)
- Tuareg rebellion (2012)

== Bibliography ==
- Baldaro, E., & Raineri, L. (2020). "Azawad: A Parastate Between Nomads and Mujahidins?" Nationalities Papers, 48(1), 100–115.
- Dubois, Felix; White, Diana (trans.) (1896). Timbuctoo the mysterious. New York: Longmans..
- Fage, J. D. (1956). An Introduction to the History of West Africa. London: Cambridge University Press. p. 22.
- Hacquard, Augustin (1900), Monographie de Tombouctou, Paris: Société des études coloniales & maritimes. Also available from Gallica.
- Hunwick, J. O. (2000). "Timbuktu". Encyclopaedia of Islam. Volume X (2nd ed.). Leiden: Brill. pp. 508–510. ISBN 90-04-11211-1..
- Hunwick, John O. (2003). Timbuktu and the Songhay Empire: Al-Sadi's Tarikh al-Sudan down to 1613 and other contemporary documents. Leiden: Brill. ISBN 978-90-04-12822-4.. First published in 1999 as ISBN 90-04-11207-3.
- Imperato, Pascal James (1989). Mali: A Search for Direction. Boulder CO: Westview Press. ISBN 1-85521-049-5..
- Kaba, Lansine (1981). "Archers, Musketeers, and Mosquitoes: The Moroccan Invasion of the Sudan and the Songhay Resistance (1591–1612)". Journal of African History. 22 (4): 457–475. doi:10.1017/S0021853700019861. JSTOR 181298. PMID 11632225. S2CID 41500711..
- Kirkby, Coel; Murray, Christina (2010). "Elusive Autonomy in Sub-Saharan Africa". In Weller, Marc; Nobbs, Katherine (eds.). Asymmetric Autonomy and the Settlement of Ethnic Conflicts. Philadelphia: University of Pennsylvania Press. pp. 97–120. ISBN 978-0-8122-4230-0.
- McIntosh, Roderick J. (2008), "Before Timbuktu: cities of the Elder World" (PDF), The Meanings of Timbuktu, HSRC Press, pp. 31–43, archived from the original (PDF) on 27 September 2020
- Saad, Elias N. (1983). Social History of Timbuktu: The Role of Muslim Scholars and Notables 1400–1900. Cambridge University Press. ISBN 0-521-24603-2..
