= Ganda Iso =

Paramilitary group

- Leaders: Seydou Cissé; Amadou Diallo
- Dates active: 2009–present
- Active regions: Mali
- Size: 1,300 (July 2012)
- Wars: Tuareg rebellion (1990–1995); Mali War; Tuareg rebellion (2012)

Ganda Iso (or Ganda Izo, meaning "Sons of Land") is a paramilitary group that emerged in Northern Mali in the late 2000s and has been active during the Mali War, which began in January 2012.

== Formation ==
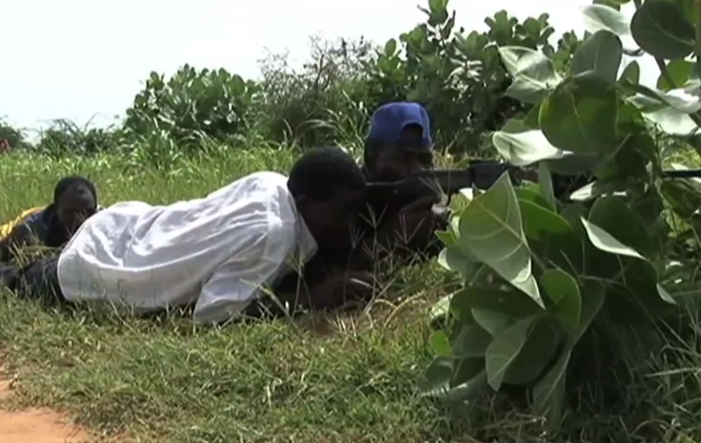
Ganda Koy militants training in Sevare, 2012.

The Ganda Koy movement was founded in May 1994, by Seydou Cissé, as a response to rising tensions between Tuaregs and sedentary black tribes of the Gao Region, in northern Mali. Ganda Koy fighters were recruited among Songhai, Bambara, Fulani, Bozo and Tuareg-Bella tribesmen.

Ganda Koy immediately rejected the “National Pact” for Peace signed in April 1992. The movement then embraced an anti-Tuareg ideology, in response to what it perceived as Tuareg oppression.

Ganda Koy later transformed into Ganda Iso, which is seen as its direct successor.

== Tuareg Conflict ==
In 1994, Ganda Koy actions amounted to 60-300 deaths.

In 2008, a Ganda Iso military leader, Sergeant Amadou Diallo, conducted a "broad daylight massacre" where four Tuareg civilians were killed. This resulted in a split between Diallo and the civilian leadership of the movement.

Amadou Diallo was reportedly killed in Ansongo, in a battle against MNLA rebels on 25 March 2012.

On 1 September 2012, the town of Douentza, in the Mopti Region, until then controlled by Ganda Iso, is taken without violence by the Movement for Oneness and Jihad in West Africa (MUJAO).
