= People's Movement for the Liberation of Azawad =

1990–1996 Tuareg militant group in north Mali

- Mouvement Populaire de Libération de l'Azawad
- Founder: Iyad Ag Ghaly
- Founded: 1988
- Dates active: 29 June 1990 – 26 March 1996

People's Movement for the Liberation of Azawad (in French: Mouvement Populaire de Libération de l'Azawad, MPLA) was a Tuareg militant rebel group in northern Mali. Initially based amongst exiles in Algeria and, especially, Libya, MPLA launched an armed campaign in June 1990. This fed into the disturbances already underway in Mali, and started a civil war. After the overthrow of the Malian government, and the introduction of electoral democracy, the rebellion gradually ceased.

On 6 January 1991 MPLA and FIAA signed the Tamanrasset Accords together with the government of Mali. The accord however failed to prevent further conflict. In December 1991 MPLA joined the United Movements and Fronts of Azawad (MFUA), which unitedly signed the National Pact peace treaty. Former MPLA fighters are believed to have been involved in the Kidal disturbances of 2006.

== See also ==
- Tuareg Rebellion (1990–1995)
