= Tuareg rebellion (1990–1995) =

Rebellion in Mali and Niger

1990–1995 Tuareg rebellion
- Part of Tuareg rebellions
Date	1990–1995 (5 years)
Location	Northern Mali and Niger
Result	1995 peace accords

Belligerents
Niger; Mali; Ganda Koy	Mali: Arab Islamic Front of Azawad (FIAA), Popular Movement for the Liberation of Azawad (MPLA), United Movements and Fronts of Azawad (MFUA). Niger: Front for the Liberation of Aïr and Azaouak (FLAA), Front for the Liberation of Tamoust, (FLT), CRA & ORA coalitions (1994–95)

Commanders and leaders
(Niger) Ali Saibou (Niger) Mahamane Ousmane (Mali) Moussa Traoré (Mali) Alpha Oumar Konaré; Seydou Cissé (Ganda Koy)	Mali: Iyad Ag Ghaly; Niger: Mano Dayak; Rhissa Ag Boula

Strength
	Mali: 7,000+ Niger:

Casualties and losses
- Over 2,500 killed in total

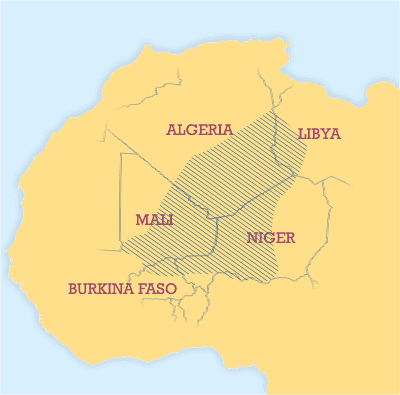
Areas where significant numbers of Tuaregs live

From 1990 to 1995, a rebellion by various Tuareg groups took place in Niger and Mali, with the aim of achieving autonomy or forming their own nation-state. The insurgency occurred in a period following the regional famine of the 1980s and subsequent refugee crisis, and a time of generalised political repression and crisis in both nations. The conflict is one in a series of Tuareg-based insurgencies in the colonial and post-colonial history of these nations. In Niger, it is also referred to as the Second or Third Tuareg Rebellion, a reference to the pre-independence rebellions of Ag Mohammed Wau Teguidda Kaocen of the Aïr Mountains in 1914 (Kaocen Revolt) and the rising of Firhoun of Ikazkazan in 1911, who reappeared in Mali in 1916. In fact, the nomadic Tuareg confederations have come into sporadic conflict with the sedentary communities of the region ever since they migrated from the Maghreb into the Sahel region between the 7th and 14th centuries CE. Some (but not all) Tuareg wanted an independent Tuareg nation to be formed when French colonialism ended. This, combined with dissatisfaction over the new governments, led some Tuareg in Northern Mali to rebel in 1963.

== Background ==
In 1962, two years after Mali 's independence , the first Tuareg rebellion , limited to the Kidal region, broke out to reject the authority of President Modibo Keïta . The Malian authorities fiercely repressed it and placed the northern region under military surveillance. They also banned French Red cross from visiting North.

Tuareg people form a distinct minority in all the Saharan countries they inhabit and a majority in many Saharan regions. In many cases, the Tuareg have been marginalised by governments based in the Sahel or on the Mediterranean coast. Desertification and droughts in 1972–74 and 84–85 killed livestock and forced the alteration of traditional migration routes, increasing conflict between neighboring groups. Aid from national governments was often unforthcoming, and many sided against the Tuareg–one notable exception being Libya. In both Mali and Niger, large numbers of Tuareg nomads fled to refugee camps in Algeria and Libya. There, militants who blamed their respective national governments for failing to aid communities in need began to co-mingle and form the future rebel groups.

Both Mali and Niger, unable to cope economically with famine, and plagued by weak, authoritarian governments, faced dissent in all communities. In Mali, President Moussa Traoré, a former military leader who had come to power in a 1968 military coup, was facing growing pressure over poverty, International Monetary Fund restrictions on government spending, drought, and 20 years of one-party rule. On 22 March 1991, he was overthrown in another military coup.

In Niger, president Ali Saïbou, the unelected military successor to 1974 coup leader General Seyni Kountché, was facing similar problems. On 9 February 1990, police suppression of a peaceful student march at Niamey's Kennedy Bridge killed at least three people. Ongoing student and labor protests began to target the government and army throughout the country.

=== Niger, 1985–1990 ===
In Niger's far north, drought, economic crisis, and the central government's political weakness came to a head in 1985. That year, a number of Tuareg in Libya formed a political opposition group called the Popular Front for the Liberation of Niger (FPLN). An armed attack by FPLN members in Tchin-Tabaradene sparked the closing of the borders with Libya and Algeria, and the resettlement of thousands of Tuareg and other nomads away from the area. As economic and political conditions worsened, grievances grew. When aid promised by Ali Saïbou's government to Tuareg returning from Algeria failed to materialise, some Tuareg attacked a police station in Tchin-Tabaradene in May 1990, leading to the death of 31, including 25 of the attackers. Initially the rebel's main demand was for the right for their children to learn Tamashek at school, but this soon escalated to a demand for autonomy. Later in May 1990, the Nigerien Military responded by arresting, torturing, and killing several hundred Tuareg civilians in Tchin-Tabaradene, Gharo and In-Gall. This became known as the Tchin-Tabaradene massacre. Tuareg outrage sparked the creation of two armed insurgent groups: the Front for the Liberation of Aïr and Azaouak and the Temoust Liberation Front.

== Mali ==
=== Mali Civil War, 1990–1996 ===
In Mali, the uprising began in 1990 when Tuareg separatists attacked government buildings around Gao in Mali. The Malian Army's reprisals led to a full-blown rebellion in which the absence of opportunities for Tuareg in the army was a major complaint. The conflict died down after Alpha Konaré formed a new government and made reparations in 1992. Also, Mali created a new self-governing region, the Kidal Region, and provided for greater Tuareg integration into Malian society.

In 1994, Tuareg, reputed to have been trained and armed by Libya, attacked Gao, which again led to major Malian Army reprisals and to the creation of the Ganda Koi Songhai militia to combat the Tuareg. Mali effectively fell into civil war.

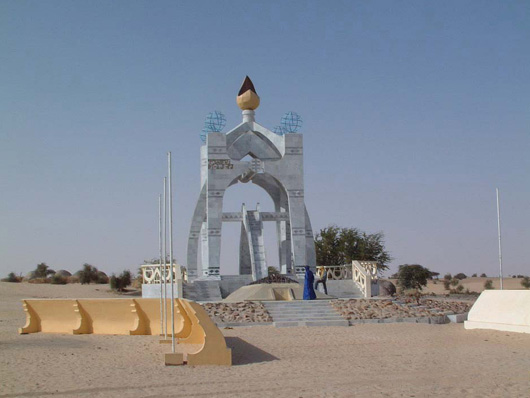
Monument commemorating the 1996 "La Flamme de la Paix" ceremony in Timbuktu.

In 1995, moderates on both sides negotiated a peace settlement.

Weapons were ceremonially burnt in 1996 in Timbuktu as a symbolic conclusion to the conflict. Aid has since been given to the Tuareg areas of the country and separatism has declined. A report prepared by a team of consultants was sent to the UN in January 1995. It stated that the major problem remained the proliferation of small arms in Mali, which constituted a significant threat to stability and national security. The weapons were collected between October 1995 and January 1996. Each combatant who returned a weapon received a disarmament and demobilization program, compensation, allowances based on concerns, social assistance, food, pocket money, medical treatment, vocational training, monthly salaries during training, and the possibility of employment in the Malian government and civil service. Mali received about 20 millions dollars from United States to support ex-rebels.

The situation, however, remained tense with fears that the conflict would be renewed.

=== 1996–2007 ===
Malian Tuareg insurgents have taken part in a long series of peace processes. The 1995 peace deals which ended the First Tuareg Rebellion promised the repatriation of Tuareg communities forced into resettlement camps in the south of the country and opportunities for Malian Tuaregs to join the central government in Bamako. Unlike the Niger ex-combatants who appeared successfully integrated into national life, small numbers of Malian Tuaregs remained restive, complaining of the Kidal region's poverty, some involved in cross-border smuggling and crime, while a splinter faction of the Tuareg ex-combatants rose in 2006. The Mali-based Tuareg group May 23, 2006 Democratic Alliance for Change (Mai 23, 2006 Alliance démocratique pour le changement - ADC), led a short, sporadic campaign in the north of Mali from May to July 2006, when they signed another peace deal with the Bamako government. After renewing the ceasefire, these forces apparently splintered further in 2007.

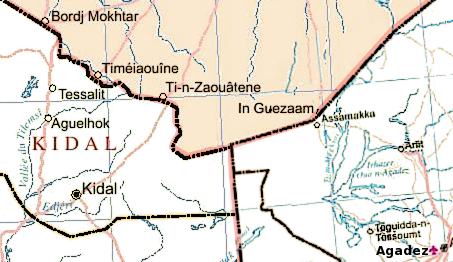
The Mali - Niger - Algeria border region.

Attacks in the extreme northeast of Mali began to grow in number and intensity in August 2007, as reports appeared that the ADC splinter group, led by former combatant Ibrahim Ag Bahanga claiming these attacks had formally confederated with the Niger-based MNJ. The MNJ has formally denied this, but witnesses of one kidnapping attack in Mali said the rebels had moved back towards the Niger border. Former Malian rebel leaders, notably the 1990s commander Iyad Ag Ghaly, denounced the 2007 violence and called on the Bahanga group to cease their attacks and offered to negotiate on behalf of the Bamako government. Regardless of the connection with the Second Tuareg Rebellion of 2007 in Niger, the small size of forces involved in the 2007 Malian violence, and the wide support for the 1995 and 2006 accords among Malian Tuareg leaders, paint a picture of a largely successful peace process.

== Niger ==
In the autumn of 1991, the Tuareg rebellion escalated in Niger. The FLAA declared the attacks on administrative centers as a reaction to the events of Tchin Tabaraden. Since 1993, the Nigerien government has been confronted with four rebel organisations: the FLAA (Front de Liberation de l'Air et de l'Azaouak), the FLT (Front de Liberation Tamoust), the ARLNN (Armée Revolutionaire de la Liberation du Nord Niger) and the FPLS (Front patriotique de libération du Sahara).

=== 1990 to 1995 peace accord ===
In Niger, sporadic fighting in the Aïr Mountains of the far north continued from 1990. The tourist center of Agadez, the uranium mining town of Arlit (largely exploited by the French multinational Areva), and the traditional Tuareg trade town of In-Gall were evacuated of foreigners and armed by the Nigerien Army. Attacks were few, the response was ineffective, but great economic damage was done, rendering the Agadez Department largely off-limits to outsiders.

The two main rebel groups in Niger agreed to a truce in 1994, just as war flared up again in Mali. The Niger-based groups formed two umbrella organisations called the Organisation of Armed Resistance (Organisation de Résistance Armée, ORA), and the Coordinated Armed resistance (Coordination de Résistance Armée, CRA), and continued a series of negotiations with the government, punctuated by fighting on both sides. The CRA signed an October 1994 accord, but by 1995 was in conflict with the government again. The ORA then negotiated an April 1995 Peace Accord, rejected by the CRA Mano Dayak, the CRA negotiator and leader of Tuareg rebels in the Tenere region died in a suspicious plane crash in 1995, on his way to meet government officials.

Finally, the government reached peace accords on 15 April 1995 with all Tuareg (and some Toubou) rebel groups, negotiated in Ouagadougou. These "Ouagadougou Accords" marked the end of most fighting, with the last armed group signing up in 1998. Since the late 1990s, the Tuareg have claimed they lacked attention and resources from the central government. The government agreed to absorb some former rebels into the military and, with French assistance, help others return to a productive civilian life. Controversy has continued to revolve around Tuareg leaders brought into government, with the arrest of the Minister of Tourism Rhissa ag Boula in 2004 and his July 2005 pardon, on suspicion of involvement in a political murder. Niger's Tuaregs continue to watch closely the development and economic activities of the government, especially in regards the Aïr Mountains' burgeoning tourist trade, and Arlit's recovering uranium industry.

=== An uneasy peace: 1995–2007 ===
In the early first decade of the 21st century, sporadic attacks continued to be claimed by Tuareg groups and the Toubou Revolutionary Armed Forces of the Sahara, but press accounts suggested these have little support in the larger community. Whatever the feelings of the broader Tuareg community in Niger, 2007 saw a complete break in relations between ex-combatants and the government. A unified force of ex-combatants began attacks against the government and mining interests in the north and repudiated the 1995 accords. This marks the beginning of the Second Tuareg Rebellion.

The Niger Movement for Justice (Mouvement des Nigériens pour la justice, MNJ) is apparently led by Aghaly ag Alambo, a former member of the Front de libération de l'Aïr et de l'Azawagh (FLAA), and Mohamed Acharif, a former captain in the Nigerien Armed Forces who defected to the rebels in May 2007.

Little information on the motivation or the make-up of the Niger-based rebels was publicly available by the summer of 2007 outside of statements by the MNJ and the Nigerien government. The government of Niger claimed these attacks were the work of small scale "bandits" and drug-trafficking gangs, and has also suggested "foreign interests" (or Areva, specifically) were funding the rebel forces. Three newspapers in Niger which speculated that Libya might be behind the rebel group were threatened with legal action by the Libyan government. On the other hand, the MNJ statements portray their movement as Niger-wide (as opposed to Tuareg nationalism) and limited to the demand for economic, political and environmental reforms.

Niger rebels say their government has failed to honor the 1995 peace deal, which ended the First Tuareg Rebellion and promised them a bigger share of the region's mineral wealth. Nigerien Tuareg leaders and some Non Government Organizations have claimed the violence of February 2007 was the culmination of widespread disaffection amongst Tuareg ex-combatants with the slow progress of promised benefits, lack of functioning democratic institutions, and a perceived special status given to foreign mining interests and southern political leaders.

== Rebel groups ==
=== Malian groups ===
Numerous rebel groups were active in Mali during the rebellion, including:

- Arab Islamic Front of Azawad (FIAA)
- Popular Movement for the Liberation of Azawad (MPLA or MPA)
- Revolutionary Liberation Army of Azawad (ARLA)
- Popular Liberation Front of Azawad (FPLA)
- National Liberation Front of Azawad (FNLA)
- The Air and Azawak Liberation Front
- The Autonomous Group of Timitrine
- The Autonomous Liberation Front of Azawad (FULA)
- The Patriotic Movement of Ganda Koye (MPGK)

Most of these groups united in 1991 to form the United Movements and Fronts of Azawad (MFUA).

=== Nigerien Tuareg groups ===
Rebel groups in Niger included:

- Front for the Liberation of Aïr and Azaouak (FLAA)
- Temoust Liberation Front (FLT), led by Mano Dayak

== See also ==
- Second Tuareg Rebellion
- Azawagh
