= Tuareg rebellion (1962–1964) =

Rebellion in Mali

Tuareg Rebellion (1962–1964)
- Part of Tuareg rebellions
Date	1962–1964 (2 years)
Location	Northern Mali
Result	Suppressed; Ceasefire

Belligerents
Mali	Tuareg tribal and clan groups

Commanders and leaders
Diby Silas Diarra	

Strength
7,000+	1,500 (maximum)

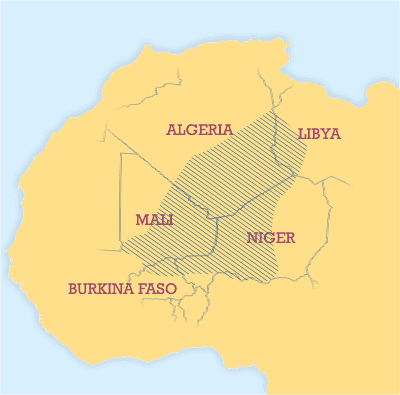
Areas where significant numbers of Tuaregs live

The Tuareg rebellion of 1962–1964, sometimes called the First Tuareg Rebellion or the Alfellaga, was an insurgency by populations of what is now northern Mali begun shortly after the nation achieved independence from France in 1960. This short revolt could only be suppressed with the entry into the conflict of Morocco and Algeria in 1963, which handed over the 35 leaders of the counter-rebellion, then imposed a military authority on the Tuareg regions.

Many in the sparsely populated and ethnically distinct north of Mali along with some in southern Algeria and northern Niger expected an independent Tuareg, Berber, and Arab nation to be formed by the Sahara desert regions when French Colonialism ended. This combined with dissatisfaction over the new government led some Tuareg in Northern Mali to rebel in 1963.

The first Tuareg attacks began in northern Mali in early 1962 with small, “hit and run” raids against government targets. The attacks escalated in size and destructiveness through 1963, resulting in very unsettled conditions in the Tuareg-populated north.

However, the Tuareg attacks did not reflect a unified leadership, a well-coordinated strategy or clear evidence of a coherent strategic vision. The insurgents generally depended on their camels for transportation and were equipped mainly with unsophisticated and rather old small arms, unlike the Malian armies who owned Soviet weapons, and the support of Algeria and Morocco. They also failed to mobilize the Tuareg community as a whole. While estimates of their numbers are highly speculative, it is unlikely that rebel combatants ever numbered more than about 1,500.

Still, the government reacted quickly and harshly. Mali's army, well-motivated and now well-equipped with new Soviet weapons, conducted vigorous counterinsurgency operations. By the end of 1964, the government's strongarm methods had crushed the rebellion. It then placed the Tuareg-populated northern regions under a repressive military administration. Many of Mali's Tuareg fled as refugees to neighboring countries. While the government had succeeded in ending the rebellion, its coercive measures alienated many Tuaregs who had not supported the insurgents. Atrocities and human rights abuses on both sides contributed to a climate of fear and distrust in the north. And while the government subsequently announced a number of programs to improve local infrastructure and economic opportunity, it lacked the resources to follow through on most of them. As a result, Tuareg grievances remained largely unaddressed, and a seething resentment continued in many Tuareg communities after 1964. Clearly, the problem of instability in the north had simply been deferred, not resolved.

== Suppression of rebellion ==
The situation changed after Mali's President Modibo Keita, in November 1963 - February 1964, enlisted the support of Algeria and Morocco in the creation of a common anti-Tuareg front. According to the agreement reached, Malian troops were given the opportunity, if necessary, to carry out raids to pursue rebels in Algerian territory. After this, the fate of the Ifulagen turned out to be dramatic.

The political successes of Malian diplomacy in the international arena also made it possible to deprive the rebels of their leadership. On their way to a meeting with Algerian President Ahmed Ben Bella , which was to take place in the Algerian city of Colomb-Béchar , the leaders of the uprising, Zeid ag-Atager and Ilyas ag-Ayyuba, were arrested. They were returned to Tessalit, and on November 1, 1963, they were flown to Kidal. In March 1964, Mohamed Ali ag-Atager was arrested in Morocco and deported to Mali. The rebels suffered an even greater loss after the arrest on March 9, 1964, again in Algeria, of their charismatic military leader Eledi ag-Ala. After brutal torture, he agreed to cooperate with the authorities.

The worst of the punitive actions was the so-called "Dibi oven", named after the commandant of the Kidal district, Diby Sillas Diarra , who invented it. A hole was dug in the sand, filled with burning coals, and then the bodies of the executed people were thrown in and covered with sand. This is how meat and bread are baked in the Sahara. It was all the more terrifying that " dibi " in the Bambara language means "roasted meat", and it was the ethnic Bambara who formed the basis of the Malian army. Victims for execution were chosen at random, they could be both Tuareg leaders and ordinary people. Among the famous people executed were, in particular, the marabout Sidi Mohamed Embakoua ag Oumayyata , the spiritual leader of the Iforas , Sheikh Sidi Haïballa ould Abidine of the Kunta Arab tribe , and the leader of the Dausagak tribe, Ayyuba ag - Mahomed Adargajuj.
