= 2006 Tuareg rebellion =

Rebellion in Mali

Date	May 23 - July 4, 2006
Location	Kidal Region and Menaka Region, Mali
Result	Algiers Accords (2006): ADC leaders launch the Tuareg rebellion (2007-2009) following the accords

Belligerents
Mali	May 23, 2006 Democratic Alliance for Change

Commanders and leaders
Amadou Toumani Toure; El Hadj Ag Gamou; Ould Meydou	Hassan Ag Fagaga; Iyad Ag Ghaly; Ibrahim Ag Bahanga; Ahmada Ag Bibi

Strength
Unknown	2,000

The Tuareg rebellion of 2006 was a short-lived rebellion by Tuareg notables demanding more autonomy for Kidal Region between May 23 and July 4, 2006. The rebellion began with mutinies by Tuareg officers integrated into the Malian army following the Tuareg rebellion of the 1990s, and mediation between the Malian government and the May 23, 2006 Democratic Alliance for Change (ADC) began immediately afterwards. The mediation culminated in the Algiers Accords of 2006, although the same Tuareg leaders during the 2006 rebellion went on to ally with Nigerien Tuareg rebels during the Tuareg rebellion of 2007 to 2009.

== Background ==
The Tuareg rebellion of the 1990s ended with the signing of a National Pact in 1996, with one of the provisions being the reintegration of Tuareg rebels into the Malian Army. In 2006, Kel Adagh Tuaregs of Kidal Region took issue with the promotion of El Hadj Ag Gamou, an Imghad Tuareg; considered by Kel Adagh to be a servile class. This promotion prompted members of the Ifergenoussen sub-clan of Kel Adagh to form the May 23, 2006 Democratic Alliance for Change, focused on gaining more autonomy for Kidal Region.

== Rebellion ==
The rebellion began on May 23, 2006, at the Malian army bases in Kidal and Menaka, with ADC-affiliated Tuareg officers mutinying and looting arms at their bases. The rebels then retreated to remote bases in the Adrar des Ifoghas mountains in northern Kidal Region. The ADC was led by Hassan Ag Fagaga, who had been passed over for promotion in favor of Gamou, and Ibrahim Ag Bahanga, Iyad Ag Ghaly, and Ahmada Ag Bibi joined the group shortly afterward. Ghaly took the reins of the rebellion early on and attracted many Ifergenoussen rebels, although the group was not entirely Ifergenoussen.

One of the leaders of the uprising, Hassan Ag Fagaga, demanded "special status" for the northern regions of Mali, which was traditionally called Azawad by local population.

Malian authorities quickly entered negotiations with the ADC immediately after the rebellion's start, and offered concessions very similar to those outlined in the National Pact and the Tamanrasset Accords. Kafougouna Koné, the Malian minister of Territorial Affairs, led the Malian delegation during the negotiations. Meanwhile, Malian forces sent reinforcements to Kidal and Menaka and formed two militias to secure territory; one was led by El Hadj Ag Gamou, and one was led by Tilemsi Arab Ould Meydou.

In June, negotiations shifted to Algerian mediation, as the ADC rejected mediation from Tuareg leaders from Kidal Region and Tuaregs from Libya. During the renewed negotiations, Algeria forced the ADC to drop their demands for autonomy, while forcing Malian officials to drop their demands of a ban on contacting Tuareg organizations in other countries. These negotiations culminated in the Algiers Accords of 2006 on July 4, 2006. Malian elites disliked the accords, and attempted to stall its implementation.

== Aftermath ==
The rebellion ended with the Algiers Accords, although Fagaga, Bahanga, Ghaly, and Bibi all helped lead the ADC in a renewed rebellion that began in 2007. From July to October 2006, the ADC and the jihadist Salafist Group for Preaching and Combat clashed multiple times across Mali, with Ghaly uniting various Tuareg groups against the GSPC.

== See also ==
- Tuareg rebellion (1962–1964)
- Tuareg rebellion (1990–1995)
- Tuareg rebellion (2007–2009)
- Mali War
