= Toulousimine ambush =

Part of the Tuareg rebellion

- Part of Tuareg rebellion (2007–2009)
Date	January 22, 2009
Location	Toulousimine, near Boghassa, Kidal Region, Mali
Result	Malian victory

Belligerents
Mali	ATNM

Commanders and leaders
El Hadj Ag Gamou; Ould Meydou; Baba Ahmed	Ibrahim Ag Bahanga

Casualties and losses
Unknown	10–20 killed 9–25 prisoners 15 injured

On January 22, 2009, Tuareg rebels of the Niger-Mali Tuareg Alliance ambushed Malian forces in Toulousimine, near Boghassa, Mali, but were pushed back by Malian forces.

== Background ==
In 2007, a rebellion broke out among Tuareg militants over the lack of implementation of a peace agreement that ended the Tuareg rebellion of 2006. In January 2009, Malian forces were in the middle of Operation Djugitugu, and had attacked and captured a base of the Tuareg rebel group Niger-Mali Tuareg Alliance. The Malian forces were commanded by Ould Meydou, a prominent Malian Arab commander, and former associates of ATNM commander Ibrahim Ag Bahanga.

== Battle ==
On January 20, 2009, Malian forces announced the capture of an ATNM base at Tinsalak, and that the surrounding area was under the control of Malian forces under the command of El Hadj Ag Gamou, Ould Meydou, Ag Cherif, Faisal, and Baba Ahmed. The capture of Tinsalak was carried out by regular Malian troops. However, two days after the capture of Tinsalak, Malian forces were ambushed by ATNM fighters in Toulousimine. The fighters were pushed back though, and retreated on four vehicles. Malian security sources stated twenty rebels were killed and twenty-five prisoners were taken, including fifteen injured. A source close to notable leaders in Kidal instead stated ten fighters were killed and nine were captured. Three vehicles were recovered by Malian forces and several others were burned.

== Aftermath ==
The failed ambush at Toulousimine was one of the last major attacks carried out by the ATNM during the Tuareg rebellion, and cemented the fracture between Ibrahim Ag Bahanga's faction of the ATNM and the remaining fighters of the May 23, 2006 Democratic Alliance for Change (ADC). Bahanga and a small group of fighters fled to Algeria shortly afterward, and other fighters surrendered to the Malian Army.
