= 2006 Kidal and Ménaka mutinies =

Officer mutiny against Malian Armed forces

2006 Kidal and Menaka mutinies
- Part of 2006 Tuareg rebellion
Date	May 23, 2006
Location	Kidal, Ménaka, and Tessalit, Mali
Result	ADC victory

Belligerents
Mali	ADC

Commanders and leaders
Unknown	Hassan Ag Fagaga; Ibrahim Ag Bahanga; Iyad Ag Ghaly; Ba Ag Moussa

Strength
Unknown	150: 75 in Kidal

Casualties and losses
2 killed	2 killed

On May 23, 2006, the May 23, 2006 Democratic Alliance for Change (ADC) simultaneously mutinied in the cities of Kidal and Ménaka, sparking the 2006 Tuareg rebellion. The mutinies were the first and only major action of the rebellion, which came to an end in the July 2006 Algiers Accords.

== Background ==
In the 1990's, Tuareg rebels fought the Malian government over alleged discrimination by southern Malians against Tuaregs from the north in a six-year long rebellion that ended in 1996 with Tuareg rebels being integrated into the Malian Armed Forces. One of the catalysts of the peace agreement during the 1990s was tensions between Ifoghas Tuaregs from northern Mali and Imghad Tuaregs, considered a sub-clan. These groups splintered and reformed often, and neither could explicitly defeat one another or the Malian Army. El Hadj Ag Gamou, an staunchly pro-Malian Imghad Tuareg who was defeated by Ifoghas Tuaregs in the 90s was promoted to the commander of the Malian garrison in Gao over Ifoghas leader Hassan Ag Fagaga. In response, Fagaga and other prominent Ifoghas like Iyad Ag Ghaly and Ibrahim Ag Bahanga created a group called the May 23, 2006 Democratic Alliance for Change (ADC) to desire more autonomy in Kidal Region and among Ifoghas Tuaregs.

== Battle ==
Under Fagaga's leadership, 150 Malian Tuareg officers mutinied from their posts in Kidal, Menaka, and Tessalit. The Tuareg officers subjugated pro-Malian colleagues starting around 5 in the morning, and quickly captured the camps at Kidal and Menaka. Seventy-five deserters took part in the attack at Kidal, and both Fagaga and Bahanga were present in the city. Fagaga stated later that two soldiers were killed each on the pro-government and ADC sides, and that Ghaly joined the insurgents later that day.

In Menaka, the town's commander Ba Ag Moussa looted his unit's weaponry and fled to the Adrar des Ifoghas mountains in northern Kidal Region to meet up with other ADC members. Other officers in Tessalit also stole weaponry and fled to the Adrar des Ifoghas. All three camps were deserted during the night between May 23 and 24, 2006.

== Aftermath ==
Following the attack, Fagaga called for a "special status" for Kidal Region, and Ghaly took the reins of the rebellion. Negotiations between the ADC and the Malian and Nigerien governments began immediately after the attack, and the Ifergenoussen sub-clan of Ifoghas Tuaregs (of whom Fagaga and Bahanga belonged to) were the heart of the new rebellion. The rebellion came to an end in July 2006 with the Algiers Accords of 2006, which promised to uphold the 1996 peace agreement and develop Kidal Region.
