= Gabriel Poudiougou =

Malian general

- Poudiougou in 2011

Chief of Staff of the Malian Armed Forces
- In office June 5, 2008 – March 28, 2012
- Succeeded by: Ibrahima Dahirou Démbélé

Personal details
- Born: January 1, 1955 (age 71) Dana, Koro Cercle, French Sudan (now Mali)

Military service
- Allegiance: Malian Armed Forces (1978-present)
- Branch/service: National Guard
- Rank: Major general

Gabriel Poudiougou is a Malian general who served as head of the integration committee for the Algiers Accords.

== Biography ==
Poudiougou was born in Dana, Koro Cercle, French Sudan (now Mali) on January 1, 1955. He graduated from the Koulikoro Combined Arms Military School as a second lieutenant in 1978. Between 1986 and 1988, he served as the civil district head of Tessalit as a captain. Stationed in Kidal Region, he fought for the Malian government against the Tuareg rebellions of Ibrahim Ag Bahanga in the 1990s and 2006. He received the Military Valor Cross for his actions in 1991. Poudiougou was trained in the USSR and France, and was commander of the National Guard between 1994 and 2001.

Poudiougou was appointed chief of staff of the Malian Armed Forces on June 5, 2008. He was a staunch supporter of President Amadou Toumani Touré, and was also promoted to brigadier general that same month. While Poudiougou was chief of staff, he reportedly embezzled one million FCFA from his operating budget in addition to an extra 15 million FCFA allocated for operations. Poudiougou actively fought against Bahanga in the Tuareg rebellion of 2007 to 2009, with help from the pro-government militias of El Hadj Ag Gamou and Ould Meydou. In October 2010, he was promoted to major general. Malian newspaper Le Pays said that Poudiougou was always willing to visit his men on the frontline when necessary.

During the 2012 Tuareg rebellion, Poudiougou moved his forces' headquarters to Gao after the First Battle of Ménaka to be closer to the fighting, but was recalled to Bamako on January 30. He went to the Kati camp when soldiers mutinied against their deployment to the north. However, the situation deteriorated and ended with the 2012 Malian coup d'état. After 2012, Poudiougou became the head of the integration commission for the Algiers Accords in 2015.
