= Battle of Abeïbara =

- Part of Tuareg rebellion (2007–2009)
Date	May 21, 2008
Location	Abeïbara, Kidal Region, Mali
Result	Malian victory

Belligerents
Mali	ATNM

Casualties and losses
15 killed, 6 injured (per Mali); 60 prisoners, 2 tanks destroyed (per ATNM)	1 killed, 2 injured (per ATNM); 17 killed, 25 injured (per Mali)

On May 21, 2008, Tuareg rebels from the Niger-Mali Tuareg Alliance attacked Malian forces in Abeïbara, Kidal Region, Mali, but were repulsed.

== Background ==
The Niger-Mali Tuareg Alliance (ATNM) led by Ibrahim Ag Bahanga began its rebellion in 2007 against the Malian government in tandem with other Tuareg rebels groups in the neighboring country of Niger. Negotiations between the ATNM, Mali, and Algeria had been ongoing since September 2007, but Algeria backed out of the negotiations in early 2008 following Libyan mediation. Around this time, Algeria had also been accused of abetting the ATNM in holding Malian hostages on Algerian soil.

== Battle ==
Around 4 or 5 in the morning on May 21, the town of Abeibara was attacked by the ATNM. Several hundred ATNM fighters transported by pick-ups surrounded the town and it's outlying National Guard posts, before opening fire on them from the nearby heights. Malian soldiers in the town responded with heavy weapons. Fighting lasted for ten hours into the afternoon, and the ATNM was eventually pushed back from the city.

The Malian Ministry of Defense announced the deaths of fifteen Malian soldiers and injuries of six others, along with the deaths of seventeen ATNM fighters and twenty-five injured. Security sources in Kidal stated that the death toll for the ATNM could be higher due to the severity of some of the injuries. A spokesperson for the ATNM stated that two Malian tabks were destroyed and sixty Malian soldiers were captured, and that one ATNM fighter was killed and two others lightly injured.

== Aftermath ==
The United Nations expressed concern and called for a peace process following the battle. The Algerian government also resumed negotiations with Mali and the ATNM following the battle. A number of civilians fled the town following the attacks as well.
