= 2008 Nampala attack =

Part of the Tuareg rebellion

Nampala attack
- Part of Tuareg rebellion (2007–2009)
Date	December 20, 2008
Location	Nampala, Mali
Result	ATNM victory

Belligerents
Mali	ATNM; MNJ (per Mali)

Commanders and leaders
Unknown	Ibrahim Ag Bahanga

Casualties and losses
9–20 killed 13 injured Several missing	11 killed (per Mali)
- Several civilians killed

On December 20, 2008, Tuareg rebels from the Niger-Mali Tuareg Alliance attacked Malian forces in Nampala, Mali.

== Background ==
Ibrahim Ag Bahanga, the leader of the Malian Tuareg rebel group Niger-Mali Tuareg Alliance (ATNM), had returned to Mali from exile in Libya just before December 2008. Bahanga's ATNM was one of the last Tuareg rebel groups active during the Tuareg rebellion, as his previous group May 23, 2006 Democratic Alliance for Change (ADC) had signed an Algerian-brokered peace agreement months prior. Beginning on December 18, 2008, Bahanga's ATNM started attacking Malian forces again.

== Battle ==
On December 20, ATNM fighters attacked the Malian garrison at Nampala after travelling around a thousand kilometers from their bases in Algeria. The ATNM convoy was spotted en route by American satellites, but Malian officials dismissed the warning. The assault began around 3 a.m., with ATNM using fifty men on around 15 to 16 pick-ups to conduct the attack. Malian security sources alleged that the Niger Movement for Justice (MNJ) was embedded with the ATNM. The initial attack was repelled by Malian forces, but rebels that had recently integrated into the Malian army mutinied and killed their company commander. The mutiny sowed panic between Malian troops, and the garrison was taken in a second ATNM attack. Malian reinforcements then arrived at Nampala.

== Aftermath ==
The Malian Ministry of Defense stated nine soldiers and eleven rebels were killed in the attack. Malian newspaper L'Essor put the toll at fifteen Malian soldiers killed and thirteen injured, with many more missing. Sources close to the ATNM alleged that twenty Malian soldiers were killed, and several civilians were killed in the attack as well.

The Nampala attack ended negotiations between rebel groups and the Malian government. Malian President Amadou Toumani Touré ordered colonels El Hadj Ag Gamou and Ould Meydou to begin Operation Djigutugu to destroy ATNM bases in and around northern Mali.
