= 2007 Tezerzaït attack =

2007 battle of the Taureg rebellion

- Part of Tuareg rebellion (2007–2009)
Date	June 22, 2007
Location	Tezirzaït, Niger
Result	MNJ victory
Territorial changes	MNJ gains control of the Tezerzaït base

Belligerents
Niger	Niger Movement for Justice

Strength
87	~100

Casualties and losses
15 killed 43 injured 72 POWs	Unknown

On June 22, 2007, the Niger Movement for Justice attacked Nigerien government positions in Tezirzaït, Niger. The battle was the first major incident in the 2007–2009 Tuareg rebellion.

== Background ==
The Niger Movement for Justice was formed in February 2007 by Tuaregs in the rural, northern areas of Niger in tandem with Malian Tuareg movements led by Ibrahim Ag Bahanga. The MNJ was created as a response to heavy French and Western mining in Tuareg lands, and MNJ leaders desired more uranium mining revenue be directed to the impoverished Tuareg-inhabited regions. The MNJ's first attack on February 8 was in the town of Iferouane, which solidified the group's existence.

== Attack ==
Prior to the attack, eighty-seven Nigerien soldiers were present at the base in Tezerzaït, which lies at the base of Mount Tamgak in the Aïr Mountains in northern Niger. The MNJ stated that the attack was a response to Nigerien President Mamadou Tandja's statements denying the existence of a Tuareg rebellion in the north. Around this time, three older Tuareg men had been kidnapped and murdered by Nigerien soldiers several weeks prior to the attack, prompting anger in Tuareg communities.

Fifteen Nigerien soldiers were killed in the attack, and seventy-two were taken hostage, forty-three of whom were injured. Around a hundred MNJ rebels and Tuareg fighters participated in the attack. A captured Nigerien officer then led MNJ fighters to the grave of the three old men immediately following the attack.

== Aftermath ==
Following the attack, the MNJ engaged in talks with the Red Cross in returning the injured Nigerien soldiers. The Nigerien government declared a state of emergency in August 2007 after MNJ attacks escalated in the region, especially around the Tchigozerine coal mine and uranium mining facilities owned by foreign companies. The MNJ also managed to control the Tezerzait base following the attack.
