= Battle of Tlemsess =

2009–2010 battle in Niger

- Part of Jihadist insurgency in Niger
Date	December 31, 2009 – January 1, 2010
Location	Tlemsess, Tahoua Region, Niger
Result	Indecisive

Belligerents
Niger	Unknown gunmen

Strength
Unknown	2 ATVs

Casualties and losses
7 killed	2–3 killed 1 arrested
- 1 civilian killed

Between December 31, 2009, and January 1, 2010, clashes broke out between Nigerien forces and unknown gunmen in Tlemsess, Tahoua Region, Niger.

== Background ==
Al-Qaeda in the Islamic Maghreb (AQIM) expanded southwards from Algeria into the Sahel in the early 2000's, killing and kidnapping tourists for ransom in Mali, Mauritania, and Niger. AQIM attacked Malian forces in al-Wasra, Mali in July 2009, killing twenty-eight people. The attack at Tlemsess took place at the same time as the Tuareg rebellion in Niger, with rebels from the Niger Movement for Justice (MNJ) present in the area, although they had laid down their weapons in October 2009. Four Saudi tourists were killed along the Niger-Mali border a week prior to the battle.

== Battle ==
Nigerien soldiers were attacked by unknown gunmen on two ATVs in the village of Tlemsess on December 31, 2009. In the initial attack, three soldiers and their civilian guide were killed, and the attackers retreated towards the Malian border. Nigerien reinforcements pursued the attackers as they fled, and one of the insurgents' vehicles broke down, sparking a shootout on the road. Four soldiers and two of the attackers were killed in the shootout, and one attacker was arrested. The clashes ended by January 1, and seven soldiers, one civilian, and three gunmen were killed. No group claimed responsibility for the attack, although AQIM and drug traffickers were suspected.
