= Baaziz =

Baaziz بعزيز
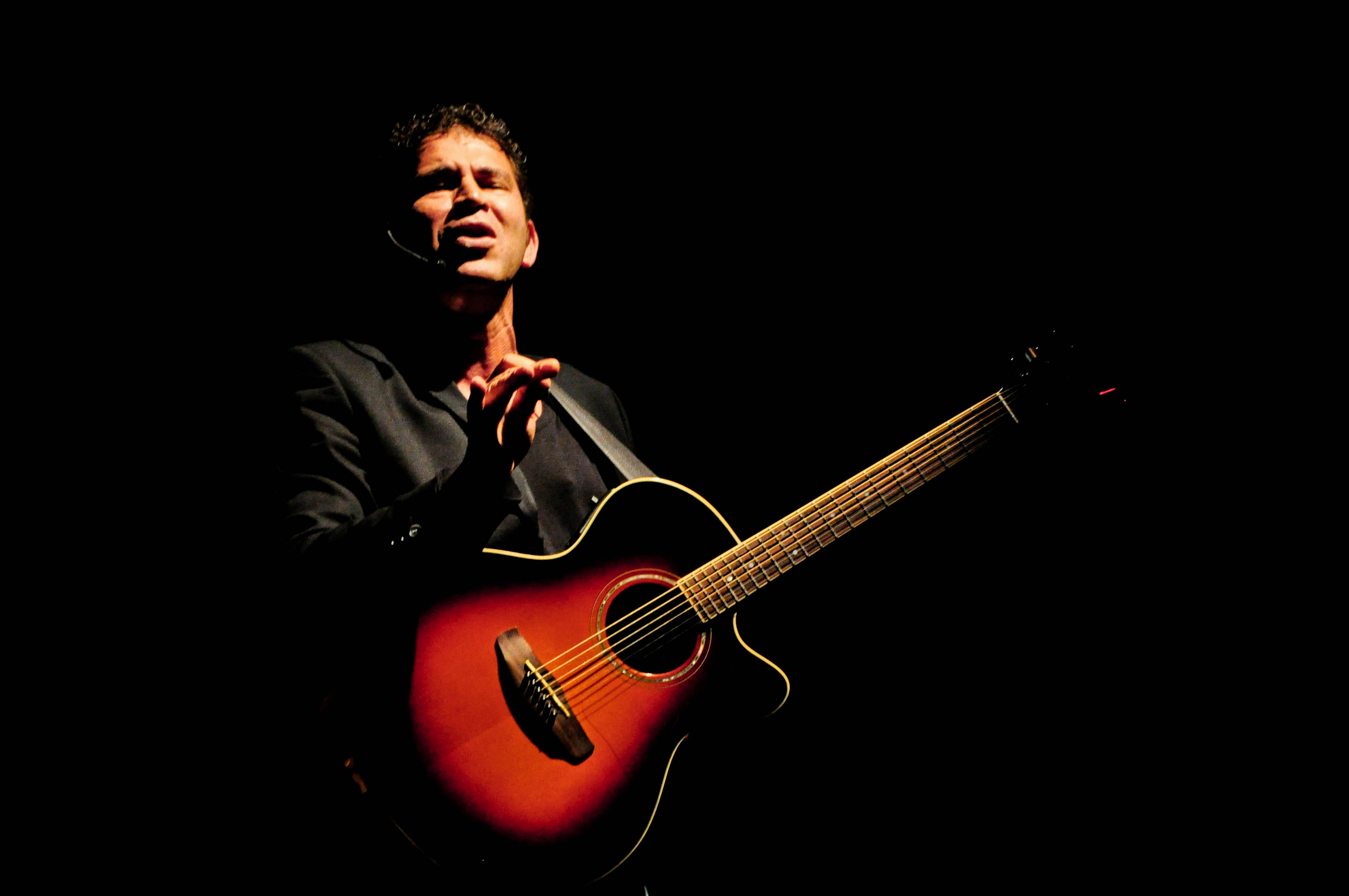

Background information
- Born: Abdelaziz Bekhti; 1963 (age 61–62); Cherchell, Algeria
- Occupations: Singer; songwriter; musician
- Instrument: Guitar
- Years active: 1989–present

Abdelaziz Bekhti (Arabic: عبد العزيز بختي; born 1963), known professionally as Baaziz (بعزيز), is an Algerian singer and songwriter.

== Life and music ==
Though resident in France, Baaziz is one of Algeria's most outspoken singer/songwriters. Baaziz first attracted attention with his debut 1989 single, "Ya Hasrah kikount Esseghir" (English: Once upon a time I was a kid), which he based on a song by the genial Rachid Ksentini. Throughout most of his career he was banned from airplay on Algerian radio and TV. However, his most successful tune, "Algeria My Love", led to special recognition from President Bouteflika. Acceptance by the Algerian government, however, was short-lived. His decision to perform a song denouncing Algeria's generals, "Waili Waili", on a live-broadcast television show despite warnings resulted in him being censured. Though a contemporary of musicians such as Cheb Hasni, Cheba Djanet, Khaled and Faudel, Baaziz is not a singer of Raï music.

== Political career ==
In 2008, Baaziz announced his intention to stand in the forthcoming Algerian presidential election. The candidacy did not, however, materialise and he announced that he would not be supporting any of the candidates.

== Discography ==
- Chaâbi Rock'n Bled (2005)
- Café de l'indépendance (2004)
- Dorénavant (1999)
- Coyotte
- Ybip-Emmou
- El-Rebelle
- The Best
