= Niger Rapid Intervention Company =

Special forces unit of the Nigerien Armed Forces

The Niger Rapid Intervention Company is a 130-man special forces unit trained by the United States Military to conduct counter-terrorist operations in 2003 to 2006 in Niger. The NRIC is a unit of the Nigerien Armed Forces, and is one of a number of small forces trained for African nations as part of the Pan Sahel Initiative (2002–2004) and Trans-Saharan Counterterrorism Initiative.

In August 2007, the Niger Movement for Justice, MNJ, a Tuareg based insurgent group, claimed defections from the army had increased their numbers to over 2,000 fighters. Some sources claim that defections included the entire Niger Rapid Intervention Company. Western journalists have also claimed that the NRIC was previously drafted into use as security for the French conglomerate Areva NC's uranium mines in Arlit, a city in northern Niger. Still other sources have claimed that it (and the rebel movement) had been created by the government itself in order to ratchet up tension in the region and thereby secure Western military aid. Subsequent communiques by the MNJ have claimed that their forces include a unit titled TIR (Troupes d'Intervention Rapide). These claims have never been independently verified.
