= Ba Ag Moussa =

Malian militant and jihadist (died 2020)

- Born: c. 1970s Tin-Essako, Mali
- Died: 10 November 2020 (aged 49–50); Essouk, Mali
- Military career
- Allegiance: Mali; Democratic Alliance for Change; National Movement for the Liberation of Azawad; Ansar Dine; Jama'at Nasr al-Islam wal Muslimin
- Rank: Colonel (Mali); Emir (Ansar Dine)
- Conflicts: Tuareg rebellion (1990–1995); Tuareg rebellion (2006); Mali War

Ba Ag Moussa (c. 1970s – 10 November 2020) was a Malian militant and jihadist.

== Biography ==
Moussa was born in Tin-Essako in the 1970s, in the Kidal Region. He was the son of a Bambara and a Tuareg. After having benefitted from military training in Libya, he aided the Malian Armed Forces in the Tuareg rebellion of the 1990s. He took up arms again during the Tuareg rebellion of 2006, rejoining the Malian Army following the 2006 Algiers Accords. He earned the rank of colonel and helped to combat insecurity in the Kidal Region.

In 2012, Moussa left the Malian Armed Forces to join the National Movement for the Liberation of Azawad. He spent a brief time with the Movement before joining Ansar Dine with support from his friend, Iyad Ag Ghaly. That year, he participated in the Battle of Menaka, the Battle of Aguelhok, and the Battle of Kidal. In 2017, Moussa joined Jama'at Nasr al-Islam wal Muslimin, taking the nickname "Abu Sharia".

After intervention by the French Armed Forces, Moussa stayed active in Nara and Kidal. He allegedly carried out attacks in Nara, Diabaly, and Niono.

On 17 March 2019, according to the Malian Army, Moussa led the attack on Dioura. However, these statements were denied by Jama'at Nasr al-Islam wal Muslimin. In 2020, the French Armed Forces declared Moussa was the leader of Jama'at Nasr al-Islam wal Muslimin. Journalist Wassim Nasr wrote that he was not the leader, but remained an important instructor within the group. In June 2020, he was suspected of directing the ambush of Bouka Weré.

== Death ==
On November 10, French intelligence services detected the presence of a pick-up in the Tadamakat area, in the Ménaka region of Mali. The French Army had been looking for several days for Ba ag Moussa, an important figure in JNIM. Ba Ag Moussa was determined to be in the pickup accompanied by 4 other armed jihadists. At the end of the day, around 6:00 p.m., a large-scale Operation is launched by the French special forces of Operation Sabre. Four helicopters, one drone, and fifteen men were engaged in the operation, which took place 7 km east of Tadamakat. After warning shots were fired on them, the jihadists exited the vehicle and were shot and killed immediately. Their bodies were buried on site.

On 13 November 2020, Florence Parly, Minister of the French Armed Forces, announced that Moussa had been killed three days prior in the Ménaka Region as part of Operation Barkhane.
