= Tezirzaït =

Tezirzaït (var. Tazerzait, Tezirzayt, Tezirzik) is a village in the Aïr Massif of northern Niger. Tezirzaït is the prime village of the Tezirzaït Valley, which forms the northern edge of the Tamgak Massif in the center-east Aïr Massif. The village is bordered on the north by the Temet massif, and runs out into the Tenere Desert and past the Chiriet massif on the east. It was twice the scene of heavy fighting during the Tuareg Rebellion. The village is the site of an oasis, a small Kel Owey Tuareg village, and nearby archeological sites, including rock carvings and neolithic graves.

== Conflict ==
On June 22, 2007, the Niger Movement for Justice (NMJ) attacked Nigerien government positions in Tezirzaït. The battle was the first major incident in the 2007–2009 Tuareg rebellion.

In February and March 2008, Nigerien forces went on the offensive against Tuareg rebels of the Niger Movement for Justice after rebel incursions into the Aïr Mountains subsided. On June 22, 2008, the MNJ attacked the Areva mining company on the outskirts of Arlit, kidnapping five people including four European nationals. The hostages were eventually released in Agadez on June 25.

The Nigerien army attacked an MNJ base in Tezirzaït on June 27, 2008. The base consisted of a well and the ruins of a nearby school, and was quickly taken by Nigerien forces with tanks, trucks, and helicopters. The Nigerien ministry of defense stated that seventeen MNJ rebels and three vehicles were destroyed, including MNJ vice-president Acharif Ag Mohamed El Moctar. The MNJ claimed that they had only lost three fighters, and that four injured fighters were taken prisoner. The MNJ claimed the deaths of twenty-six Nigerien soldiers, and the loss of a MiG helicopter. They also claimed that Moctar was initially captured alive with his leg torn to shreds, and that the Nigerien army executed him.

== Bibliography ==
- Jolijn Geels. Niger. Bradt UK/ Globe Pequot Press USA (2006) ISBN 978-1-84162-152-4
- Ezza Tours: Circuit traversee Air & Tenere
