= Battle of In Emsal =

Coordinates: 15.9167°N 2.4000°E

- Part of 2012 Northern Mali conflict
- Battle of In Emsal (Mali)
Date	20 January 2012
Location	South of Aguelhoc, Mali
Result	Rebel Victory

Belligerents
Mali	(Azawad) MNLA; AQIM; Ansar Dine

Commanders and leaders
(Mali) Mohamed Abderrahmane Ould Meydou	Cheikh Ag Aoussa (Azawad) Ibah Ag Moussa

Casualties and losses
10 killed (according to Mali); 50–101 killed 25–65 captured 1–5 BRDM-2 destroyed 40 vehicles trucks destroyed 26 vehicles captured (according to the MNLA)	2 wounded (according to the MNLA)

The battle of In Emsal took place during the Tuareg rebellion of 2012. On 20 January, a Malian military convoy that came to rescue the garrison of Aguelhoc was ambushed by rebels of MLNA, and terrorists of Ansar Dine and AQIM.

== The battle ==
Following the attack on the town of Aguelhoc by the MNLA, Ansar Dine, and AQIM rebels, a Malian military convoy commanded by Colonel Ould Meydou, leader of a group of Arab militiamen, departed Gao on January 19 heading to Aguelhok in the North. But too confident, he did not send scouts to search the region for rebels, and the next day, 15 kilometers south of Aguel'hoc, the Malian column attacked by MLNA-Islamist coalition. The battle took place in the Wadi of In Emsal (also called Imenzad or Imezzehene). The clash lasted all day, and the Malians finally forced to turn around, carrying several wounded with them not being able to reach their, destination.

== Casualties ==
According to an MNLA statement issued on 22 January by Communication Officer Bakay Ag Hamed Ahmed, the Malian losses were 50 dead, 25 prisoners, 26 vehicles captured, 40 vehicles destroyed, 1 tank, and 1 BRDM. The MNLA claimed that it had only two wounded i its ranks. Mossa Ag Attaher, another spokesman for the MNLA, responsible for media relations, gave a higher score on 21 January. According to him the Malian losses are 101 dead, 65 prisoners, 4 military trucks burned and 5 BRDM destroyed. The convoy consisted of 40 vehicles, including Toyota pick-ups equipped with machine guns, BRDMs and troop transport trucks. For its part, the Malian government recognized only a dozen deaths on its side during the battle.
