= Ibrahima Dahirou Dembélé =

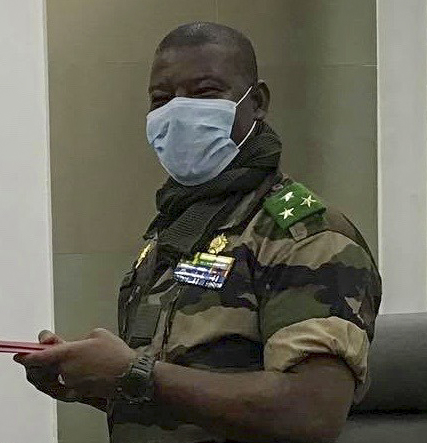
- Dembélé on April 14, 2020

Minister of Defense of Mali
- In office May 5, 2019 – August 18, 2020
- Preceded by: Tiémoko Sangaré
- Succeeded by: Sadio Camara

Chief of Staff of the Malian Armed Forces
- In office March 28, 2012 – November 9, 2013
- Preceded by: Gabriel Poudiougou
- Succeeded by: Mahamane Touré

Personal details
- Born: January 9, 1967 (age 59) Ségou, Mali
- Education: Kati Military Academy; Koulikoro Joint Military School

Military service
- Rank: General

Ibrahima Dahirou Dembélé is a Malian general who served as the Minister of Defense of Mali from May 5, 2019, to August 18, 2020.

== Biography ==
Dembélé was born on January 9, 1967, in Ségou, Mali. He graduated from the Kati Military Academy in 1981, and entered the Koulikoro Joint Military School in Koulikoro in 1998. Following his graduation from Koulikoro in 1991, he commanded several units in northern and central Mali. Dembélé became the Malian chief of staff on March 28, 2012, after the 2012 Malian coup d'état, although he was dismissed by newly elected president Ibrahim Boubacar Keïta in November 2013 and replaced by Mahamane Touré. Dembélé was accused of "passive complicity" over the killing of 21 paratroopers from the 33rd Parachute Commando Regiment, and was relieved from judicial control in January 2018. He was appointed on May 5, 2019, as Minister of Defense by the Boubou Cissé government.

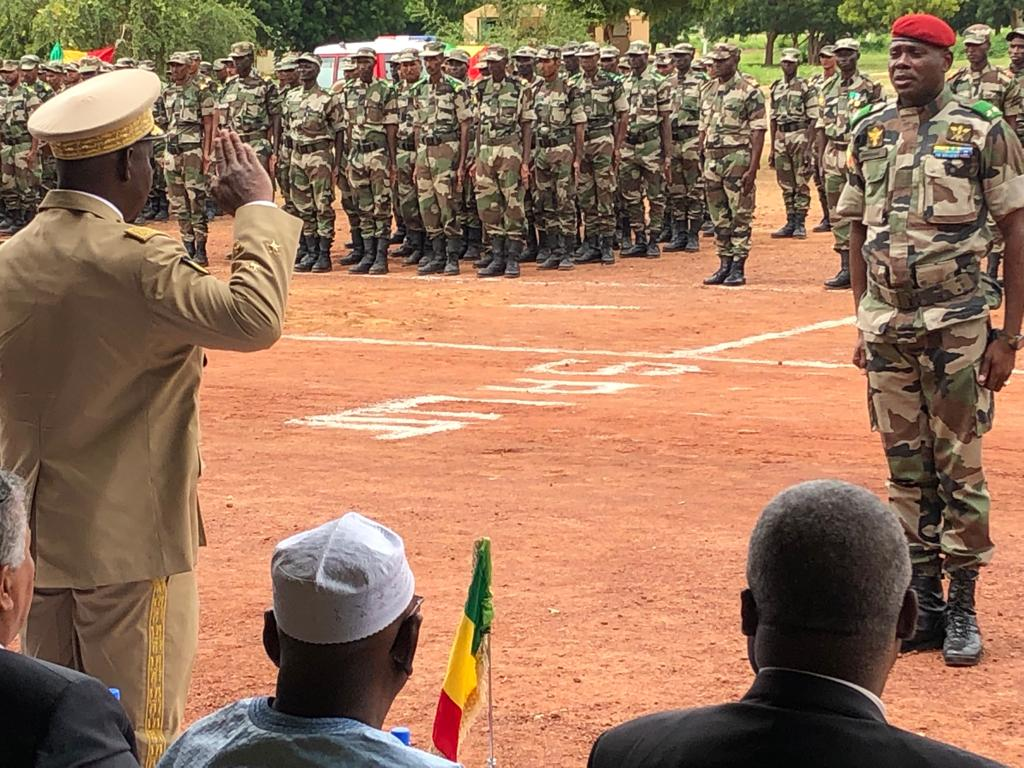
Malian generals Dembélé (left) and Keba Sangaré at the Bafo camp on September 8, 2019

Dembélé was arrested and sacked from his position during the 2020 Malian coup d'état.
