= La Mort de la gazelle =

- Directed by: Jérémie Reichenbach
- Screenplay by: Jérémie Reichenbach
- Produced by: Entre2prises
- Cinematography: Jérémie Reichenbach
- Edited by: David Jungman
- Release date: 2008
- Running time: 45 minutes
- Country: France

La Mort de la gazelle is a 2008 documentary film.

== Synopsis ==
Since the late 1980s, a sporadic guerrilla war has plagued northern Niger somewhere in the Sahara. In 2007, a group of armed men attacked an army barracks. They claimed to be from the Niger Movement for Justice (NMJ). Hundreds of men then joined the movement. Jérémie Reichenbach films some of these men, ready to fight in a very uncertain atmosphere, between war and peace. Under duress of an invisible enemy, isolated from the rest of the world, they wait for the fight.

== Awards ==
- Brive (France) 2009
