= Mahamane Touré =

Chief of Staff of the Malian Armed Forces from 2013 to 2016

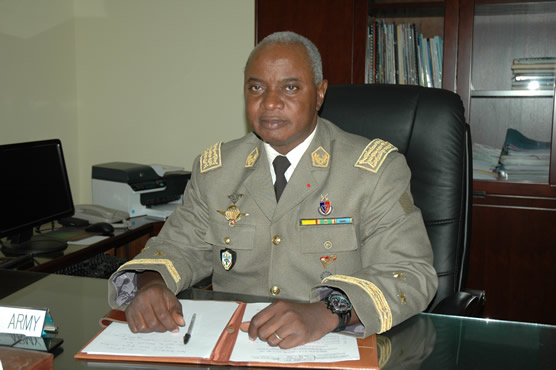
- Touré circa 2013

Chief of Staff of the Malian Armed Forces
- In office November 8, 2013 – June 29, 2016
- Preceded by: Ibrahima Dahirou Dembélé
- Succeeded by: Didier Dacko

Personal details
- Born: 1954 (age 70–71) Markala, French Sudan (now Markala, Mali)
- Occupation: Malian Ambassador to Niger (2018 - unknown)

Military service
- Battles/wars: Mali War: Second Battle of Kidal

Mahamane Touré is a Malian general who served as Malian Chief of Staff from 2013 to 2016, and afterwards became the Malian ambassador to Niger.

== Biography ==
Touré was born in 1954 near Markala, Mali. He joined the 33rd Parachute Commando Regiment in 1972, later becoming director general of Malian customs between 1994 and 1996. Touré then served in the Malian ministry of defense. From 2006 to 2012, he served as Commissioner of Political Affairs, Peace, and Security at ECOWAS. He was appointed brigadier general on October 1, 2010, and then became director of the Alioune Blondin Beye School of Peacekeeping form March 2012.

Touré became Malian Chief of Staff on November 8, 2013, but resigned after Malian forces were routed during the Second Battle of Kidal in May 2014. Ultimately, he remained in his position, retiring on June 29, 2016. He was replaced by Didier Dacko, and was sacked because of his refusal to sanction the actions of El Hadj Ag Gamou and atrocities committed by GATIA, Gamou's militia. Touré was named Malian ambassador to Niger on July 23, 2018.
