= Abeïbara Cercle =

Coordinates: 19°40′N 2°15′E

Abeïbara
- Cercle
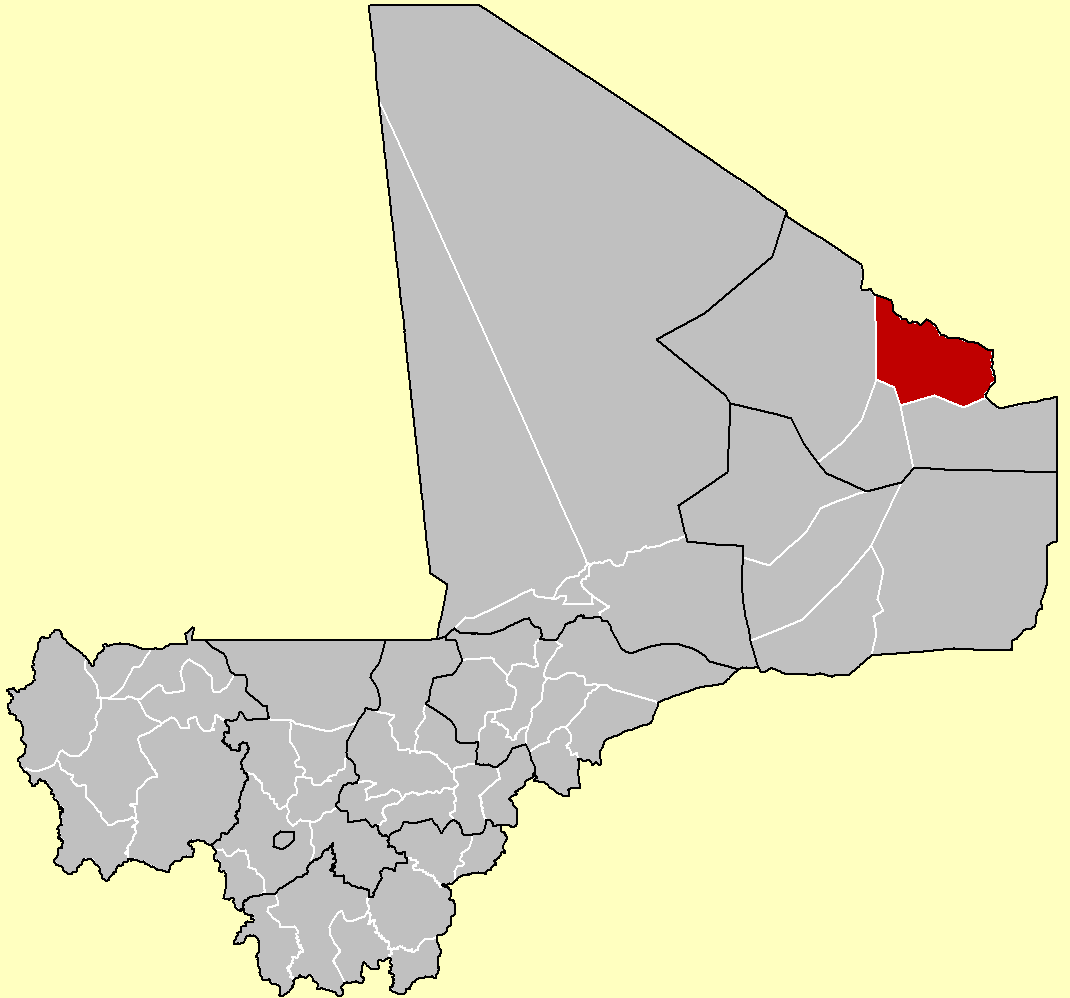
- Abeïbara Cercle in Mali
- Country: Mali
- Region: Kidal Region
- Capital: Abeïbara

Population (2009)
  - Total: 10,286
- Time zone: UTC+0 (GMT)

Abeïbara Cercle is an administrative subdivision of the Kidal Region of north-eastern Mali. The capital lies at the small town of Abeïbara. The Cercle is divided into Communes, and below this, quarters/villages. As of 2009 the cercle had a population of 10,286.

== Communes ==
The Abeïbara Cercle contains the following Rural Communes:

- Abeïbara
- Boghassa
- Tinzawatene
