= Revolutionary Armed Forces of the Sahara =

Revolutionary Armed Forces of the Sahara (French: Forces armées révolutionnaires du Sahara, FARS) is a Toubou militant group in Niger, presumably of separatist intentions, who kidnapped two Italian tourists in August 2006. Boubakar Mohamed Sogoma, ethnically Toubou, is a commander of FARS in 2008.

== See also ==
- Niger Movement for Justice (French: Mouvement des Nigériens pour la justice, MNJ)
- Azawagh
