= Danet =

Danet is a surname. Notable people with the surname include:

- Jean Danet (1924–2001), French actor, activist, and gay theorist
- Pierre Danet (1650–1709), French lexicographer
