= Hassan Ag Fagaga =

Malian soldier

- Born: 1959/1966; Kidal
- Died: December 22, 2023
- Allegiance: Libya (1980's); MPLA (1991); MPA (1991-1996); Mali (1996-2006); ADC (2006-2009); ATNM (2006-2009); Mali (2006); MNLA (2011-2023)
- Conflicts: Lebanese Civil War: Siege of Beirut; Tuareg rebellion (2006): Battle of Kidal (2006); Mali War: Battle of Anefis (2014); Battle of Tabankort (2014)

Hassan Ag Fagaga (b. around 1959 or 1966, in Kidal, Mali, d. 22 December 2023) was a Malian soldier and a Tuareg rebel.

== Biography ==
Hassan Ag Fagaga was an Ifoghas Tuareg from the Ifergoumissen tribe. He completed his military training in Libya and Syria, and participated in the Lebanese Civil War, fighting in the Siege of Beirut.

Fagaga participated in the Tuareg rebellion of 1990–1995, first fighting in the MPLA in 1991, then fighting in the Popular Movement for Azawad under Iyad Ag Ghaly. In 1996, after the peace agreements, he was instated into the Malian army with the rank of commander. He led the Tuareg rebellion of 2006 in March with Ghaly and Ibrahim Ag Bahanga. Fagaga launched a raid on Kidal and Ménaka on May 22 and 23, 2006.

During the Tuareg rebellion of 2006, Fagaga led another rebellion with Ghaly and Ibrahim Ag Bahanga. On May 23, 2006, he launched a raid against Kidal. Following the end of the 2006 rebellion, Fagaga rejoined the Malian army for a short time.

Fagaga joined the Tuareg rebellion of 2007–2009 as well, commanding the May 23, 2006 Democratic Alliance for Change (ADC) rebel group. He attacked Malian forces at Tinzaouaten in September 2007. That same month, Bahanga and Fagaga created the Niger-Mali Tuareg Alliance for Change, but it did not receive support in Niger. Later, the ADC's name was changed to ATNMC, but ADC was still used colloquially. During Algerian mediation in the rebellion in 2008, Fagaga fled to Libya. He also stated he would attack any al-Qaeda fighters within the Tuareg rebels, but admitted that some had infiltrated the rebellion. Fagaga launched an attack on Nampalari in 2008. Following a Malian offensive, Fagaga laid down his arms on January 4, 2009, along with 300 other ADC fighters.

In 2010, Fagaga attempted to revive the ATNMC as a regional anti-al-Qaeda fighting force, but did not succeed.

He also joined the Tuareg rebellion in 2012, fighting in the National Movement for the Liberation of Azawad. He left Kidal with his men in 2013, after the city fell under Malian government control.

Clashes broke out between the Platform coalition and a rebel coalition led by Fagaga consisting of the MNLA, High Council for the Unity of Azawad, and the anti-Bamako faction of the Arab Movement of Azawad in 2015. The rebels were defeated at the Battle of Anefis in 2014. In the Algiers Agreement of 2015, Fagaga was appointed head of the interim authorities in Kidal, which was put into effect in 2017. In 2016, Fagaga joined a delegation of Coordination of Azawad Movements (CMA) leaders in Bamako attempting to revive the Algiers agreements. Fagaga's brother Azbi was killed by French forces after launching an attack on a Malian refugee camp at the Malian-Nigerien border, killing 22 Nigerien soldiers.

In a May 2017 interview with Jeune Afrique, Fagaga claims to have not seen Ghaly since 2012, stating "Iyad says he fights for the application of sharia. It's a noble cause. On the other hand, I do not approve of his method of achieving this."

Hassan Ag Fagaga was killed on the morning of December 22, 2023, in Tin Zaouatine, by a drone strike by the Malian army. Four other fighters were killed during this strike. The Permanent Strategic Framework (CSP) announces his death on December 23.
