= Ould Meydou =

- Born: Mohamed Abderrahmane Ould Meydou; Gao, Mali
- Allegiance: Mali
- Rank: Division general
- Conflicts: Tuareg rebellion (2007-2009): Battle of Nampala (2008); Mali War: Battle of In Emsal; Battle of Tessalit
- Other work: Governor of Taoudénit Region (2017-present); Commissioner of the Malian Truth and Reconciliation Committee (2013-2017)

Mohamed Abderrahmane Ould Meydou, also known as Ould Meydou, is a Malian general who participated in the Tuareg rebellion of 2007 to 2009 and the Mali War. Meydou has also served as the governor of Taoudénit Region since 2017.

== Biography ==
Meydou was born in Gao, Mali, and derives from the Lemhar Arab community from the Tilemsi desert. He joined the Joint Military School in Koulikoro in 1996. Between 1997 and 1998, he served as the commander of the 3rd military region that included Kati. As a colonel during the Tuareg rebellion of 2007 to 2009, he fought in the battle of Nampala. Between 2008 and 2009, he served as the head of a militia consisting of Arabs and Tuaregs that fought against Ibrahim Ag Bahanga.

When the Tuareg rebellion broke out in 2012, Meydou was a colonel-major. He asked for the release of drug trafficker Mohamed Ould Awainat to help recruit fighters from Arab communities. He attempted to break the siege of the Aguelhok garrison, but fell into an ambush near In Emsal and was forced to retreat. He also attempted to help Malian forces at Tessalit, but failed.

From 2013 to 2017, Meydou served as a commissioner at the Malian Truth and Reconciliation Commission. On September 18, 2013, he was promoted to brigadier general by Ibrahim Boubacar Keïta. He escaped an assassination attempt from al-Mourabitoun in Bamako on January 26, 2015, but survived albeit injured. On June 7, 2017, Meydou was appointed to governor of the Taoudénit Region with a residence in Timbuktu. He was appointed major-general on September 20, 2018.

Protests erupted against Meydou's rule of Taoudenit in 2021, but were met with counter-protests in favor of his rule. Malian civil society groups denounced Meydou in the wake of the protests, stating that he gave jobs to family members and did not represent the civilian population. During the offensive by the Coordination of Azawad Movements against the Malian government in September 2023, Meydou called for dialogue as the only way forward between Mali and the CMA.
