= Algiers Accords (2006) =

Algiers Accords for the Restoration of Peace, Security, and Development in Kidal Region
- Signed: July 4, 2006
- Mediators: Algeria
- Signatories: Kafougouna Koné; Ahmada Ag Bibi; Abdelkrim Ghraieb
- Parties: Mali; May 23, 2006 Democratic Alliance for Change

The Algiers Accords for the Restoration of Peace, Security, and Development in Kidal Region were the peace agreements that laid out a roadmap to development of northern Mali and the end of the Tuareg rebellion of 2006. The accords allowed for a normalization of relations between Kidal Region, Ménaka Cercle, and the Malian government. The agreement was signed on July 4, 2006, and was signed between Malian government representatives and representatives of the May 23, 2006 Democratic Alliance for Change, under Algerian mediation.

== Criticism ==
Malian NGOs, under the Consultation and Support Council of NGOs of Mali (CCA-ONG) decried the agreement when it was first implemented. The CCA-ONG believed "there was a risk of erosion of state authority", and that "the Algiers accords constitute a means of moving the problem over time and not a lasting solution as stated in the preamble." The organization stated that the Algiers Accords would end up like the National Pact of 1992, signed between the Malian government and Unified Front of Azawad that failed to resolve the Tuareg rebellion of the 1990s.

Rally for Mali, the opposition at the time led by Ibrahim Boubacar Keïta, also rejected the agreement and claimed it disrespected national unity. The RPM appealed to the Constitutional Court that the text of the agreement did not follow the Malian constitution.

== Implementation and aftermath ==
The agreement did not work, and Tuareg fighters rebelled in 2007 leading to the Tuareg rebellion of 2007 to 2009. On November 5, 2009, the Malian National Assembly voted on a fund for the socio-economic and infrastructural development of Kidal region. This fund received 127 votes for, none against, and two abstentions. The fund also helped Gao Region and Tombouctou Region, for a cost of 700 billion CFA franc, and was one of the stipulations delineated in the Algiers Accords.
