= Boghassa =

- Commune and village
- Location in Mali
- Coordinates: 20°1′12″N 2°15′40″E
- Country: Mali
- Region: Kidal Region
- Cercle: Abeïbara Cercle

Area
  - Total: 11,000 km^{2} (4,200 sq mi)
- Elevation: 703 m (2,306 ft)

Population (2009 census)
  - Total: 3,401
  - Density: 0.31/km^{2} (0.80/sq mi)
- Time zone: UTC+0 (GMT)

Boghassa (var. Boughessa) is a Saharan-Malian village and commune in the Cercle of Abeïbara in the Kidal Region of north-eastern Mali near the border with Algeria. In the 2009 census the commune had a population of 3,401.
