= Bouteflika =

Bouteflika is a surname. Notable people with the surname include:

- Abdelaziz Bouteflika (1937–2021), Algerian politician
- Saïd Bouteflika (born 1958), Algerian politician and academic, Abdelaziz's brother
