= Niger-Mali Tuareg Alliance =

- Alliance Touareg Niger-Mali
- Leaders: Ibrahim Ag Bahanga; Hassan Ag Fagaga
- Dates active: July 2006 - 2009
- Split from: May 23, 2006 Democratic Alliance for Change
- Ideology: Tuareg nationalism
- Size: 100-1,000; 3,000 (per Bahanga)
- Wars: Tuareg rebellion (2007-2009)

The Niger-Mali Tuareg Alliance (French: Alliance Touareg Niger-Mali), abbreviated ATNM was a political and military organization between Malian Tuaregs of the Adrar des Ifoghas and Nigerien Tuaregs.

== History ==
The ATNM was founded between July 25 and 27, 2006 by Ibrahim Ag Bahanga following disagreements with the recently signed Algiers Accords, claiming they were not being implemented. The ATNM was a splinter group from the May 23, 2006 Democratic Alliance for Change (ADC), which Bahanga was a founder of. The first attack by the group was in Tinzaouaten on May 11, 2007, which left eight fighters dead and two Malian soldiers dead. A second attack in Tedjeret saw sixty Nigerien soldiers taken hostage by ATNM. Following this attack, Hassan Ag Fagaga joined the ATNM.

The group was alleged to have contacts with drug traffickers in Mali and Niger. While the Malian government alleged links between ATNM and Al-Qaeda in the Islamic Maghreb (AQIM), Bahanga denied any connection with AQIM. Fagaga and Bahanga's leadership and heavy losses among ATNM fighters caused the group to decline, and the group disarmed in 2009 when Libya offered monetary compensation to the fighters.

== See also ==
- May 23, 2006 Democratic Alliance for Change
