= Tuareg rebellion (2007–2009) =

Tuareg insurgency in Mali and Niger

2007–2009 Tuareg rebellion
- Part of the Tuareg rebellions and Operation Juniper Shield
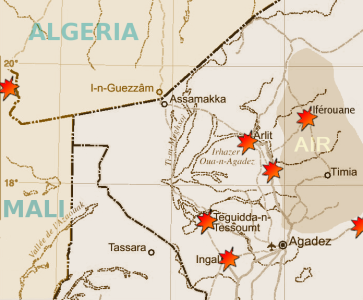
Date	6 February 2007 – 3 May 2009 (2 years, 2 months, 3 weeks and 6 days)
Location	Northern Niger and Northeast Mali
Result	Peace deals brokered by Mali in August 2008 and February 2009; Ceasefire and amnesty declared in Niger in May 2009; Integration of some rebels into the military

Belligerents
Niger; Mali	In Niger: Niger Movement for Justice; Front of Forces for Rectification (2008 split); Niger Patriotic Front (2009 split); In Mali: ADC; ATNM (2008 split)

Commanders and leaders
Mamadou Ousseini (Nigerien Army Chief of Staff)	In Niger: Aghaly ag Alambo; In Mali: Ibrahim Ag Bahanga; Hassan Ag Fagaga

Strength
4,000; Unknown	In Mali: 165–400+

Casualties and losses
Niger: ~70–159 killed 100+ captured Mali: ~60 killed	~200 killed
- Civilian casualties: At least 10 Malian and tens to hundreds of Nigerien civilians killed

The 2007–2009 Tuareg rebellion was an insurgency that began in February 2007 amongst elements of the Tuareg people living in the Sahara desert regions of northern Mali and Niger. It is one of a series of insurgencies by formerly nomadic Tuareg populations, which had last appeared in the mid-1990s, and date back at least to 1916. Populations dispersed to Algeria and Libya, as well as to the south of Niger and Mali in the 1990s returned only in the late 1990s. Former fighters were to be integrated into national militaries, but the process has been slow and caused increased resentment. Malian Tuaregs had conducted some raids in 2005–2006, which ended in a renewed peace agreement. Fighting in both nations was carried on largely in parallel, but not in concert. While fighting was mostly confined to guerrilla attacks and army counterattacks, large portions of the desert north of each nation were no-go zones for the military and civilians fled to regional capitals like Kidal, Mali and Agadez, Niger. Fighting was largely contained within Mali's Kidal Region and Niger's Agadez Region. Algeria helped negotiate an August 2008 Malian peace deal, which was broken by a rebel faction in December, crushed by the Malian military and wholesale defections of rebels to the government. Niger saw heavy fighting and disruption of uranium production in the mountainous north before a Libyan backed peace deal aided by a factional split among the rebels brought a negotiated ceasefire and amnesty in May 2009.

== Timeline ==
Attacks beginning in February 2007 by the Niger Movement for Justice (MNJ) targeted outposts of the Nigerien Armed Forces and foreign economic interests. The group said they were fighting for greater economic development and a share in the region's mineral wealth, an end to alleged pollution caused by and poverty surrounding the mining operations at Arlit. The area of Niger affected is home to some of the world's largest uranium deposits, and the French operated uranium mines of the desert town of Arlit account for a fifth of the world's uranium deposits and most of Niger's foreign exchange income.

In September 2007, fighting shifted to Mali, with a portion of the Tuareg groups which had come under a 2006 ceasefire returning to combat. A swift Malian military response, coupled with the diplomatic intervention of other Malian Tuaregs, led to a new, unofficial ceasefire in December 2007. In April 2008, with the help of Libya, a formal ceasefire was declared, though it was quickly followed by new, retributive attacks from both sides. Resumed diplomatic and military pressure, with the intervention of Algerian diplomacy, brought what appeared to be a final reintegration of the Malian rebel factions in July 2008, along much the same lines of the 2006 peace plan. After both Libyan and Algerian sponsored peace talks, Malian rebel leader Ibrahim Ag Bahanga relocated to Libya and the remaining Malian rebels and government concluded a settlement to the conflict. In December 2008, Ag Bahanga's faction of the ADC (Alliance Touareg Nord Mali pour le Changement, ATNMC) returned to conflict in a series of attacks and counterattacks in the far north. This splinter group, despite a series of daring raids deep into populated areas, were decisively defeated by the Malian Army during January 2009, supported by an increasing number of former rebels. In February 2009, elements surrounding Ag Bahanga again fled Mali for Libya, while both Libya and Algeria pledged support to end rebel attacks and support negotiations. ADC fighters negotiated a return to the disarmament agreed in 2008, and began being processed for integration into the Malian Armed Forces in camps near Kidal.

Both conflicts were brought under increased international attention following the kidnapping in late 2008 in Niger of two Canadian diplomats and four European tourists by groups associated with Al-Qaeda Organization in the Islamic Maghreb, who held their victims somewhere in northern Mali. Libya, Algeria, Mali, and Niger pledged in March 2009 to cooperate to secure the Saharan borders where Tuareg rebels and AQIM militants, as well as smugglers and criminal gangs, operated.

In Niger, fighting flared after a Ramadan truce in 2007, with land-mine attacks and incursions reaching areas in the south and center of the nation previously unaffected. The Nigerien government, rejecting any negotiations, pursued a crackdown on rebel forces and declared a state of emergency in the north which by December 2007 threatened to spark a humanitarian crisis. High-profile arrests of domestic and foreign media, the expulsion of European NGOs from the area, and the reported human rights practices of the Nigerien Armed Forces in the Agadez Region have led to criticism of the Nigerien government abroad, and continued fighting in the north. Despite government military victories in early 2008, and condemnation for a hostage seizure and land-mine attacks (for which the rebels deny responsibility), the MNJ appeared no closer to either defeat or overthrow of the Nigerien government as the rainy season approached in August 2008.

The return and then splintering away from the main rebel group of factional leaders from the 1990s conflict complicated the situation in 2008. One group joined the rebels, only to be expelled and sign a peace deal with the government of Niger. Another faction, which seemed to have been involved in the political front, appeared and quickly split in early 2008. Irregular fighting and raids occurred throughout late 2008, but these were mostly limited to the rebel strongholds in the Aïr Mountains. Suppression of domestic and international press access, as well as the expulsion of aid agencies from the Agadez Region by the government has meant that there was little independent confirmation of the situation in northern Niger throughout 2008.

The Nigerien rebels pursued a strategy of expanding the ethnic makeup of their forces, and attempted—with little success in the south—to broaden the insurgency into a social movement to replace the current government and provide the population with a share in Niger's growing mining sector. By the beginning of 2009, rebel attempts to impinge upon Nigerien uranium production had, according to mining officials, little effect. The effects on the population of the north has been pronounced, with the regional capitol of Agadez hosting thousands of refugees, economic activity outside the towns grinding to a halt, and the destruction of a burgeoning foreign tourist industry in the north of the country.

The 2009 peace in Mali was seen as a model for a February civil society conference in Niamey. In March 2009 a dramatic split of much of the MNJ leadership resulted in the former MNJ head fleeing to Libya, who aided delivering Nigerien Armed Forces prisoners home. The new Nigerien Patriotic Front (FPN), which contained much of the MNJ's fighters and leadership, called for a negotiated peace. They, along with an earlier splinter, entered into four-party talks with the Nigerien government under Libyan auspices from March to June 2009. All sides pledged an immediate ceasefire in May 2009, while pursuing talks for a permanent peace and an amnesty for all former rebels.

== Causes of conflict ==
=== Niger ===
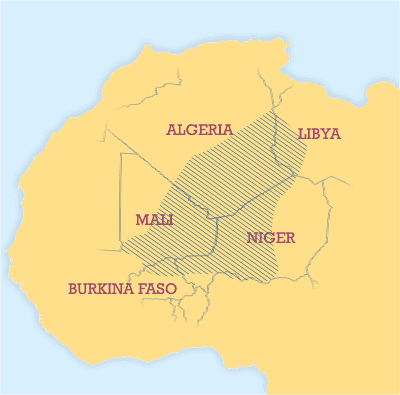
Areas where significant numbers of Tuaregs live

Niger rebels claimed that their government failed to honor a 1995 peace deal, which ended the 1990s Tuareg insurgency and promised them a bigger share of the region's mineral wealth. Nigerien Tuareg leaders and some Non Government Organisations have claimed the violence of February 2007 was the culmination of widespread disaffection amongst Tuareg ex-combatants with the slow progress of promised benefits, lack of functioning democratic institutions, and a perceived special status given to foreign mining interests and southern political leaders.

As part of an initiative started under a 1991 National Conference, the peace accords of 15 April 1995 with all Tuareg (and some Toubou) rebel groups were negotiated with Government of Niger in Ouagadougou, the final armed group signing up in 1998. The peace deal repatriating thousands of refugees and fighters, mostly from camps across the Libyan border. Large numbers of fighters were integrated into the Nigerien Armed Forces and, with French assistance, help others return to a productive civilian life. Controversy continued to revolve around Tuareg leaders brought into government, with the arrest of the Minister of Tourism Rhissa ag Boula in February 2004 and his March 2005 release after being held in jail for more than a year on suspicion of involvement in a political murder, while Mano Dayak, a Tuareg leader and negotiator who led the Tuareg rebellion in the Tenere region died in a suspicious plane crash in 1995. Niger's Tuaregs continued to watch the development and economic activities of the government closely, especially in regards the Aïr Mountains' burgeoning tourist trade, and Arlit's recovering uranium industry. By 2000, sporadic banditry and attacks, ascribed to disaffected ex-combatants, began in the north. In 2007, a unified force of ex-combatants repudiated the 1995 accords and declared the formation of the MNJ.

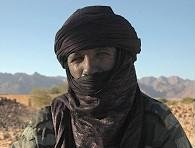
Nigerien Rebel President Aghaly Ag Alambo, giving an interview in the MNJ's Aïr Mountains base, January–February 2008.

The Niger Movement for Justice (French: Mouvement des Nigériens pour la justice, MNJ) was led by Aghaly ag Alambo, a former member of the Front de libération de l'Aïr et de l'Azawagh (FLAA), and Mohamed Acharif, a former captain in the Nigerien Armed Forces who defected to the rebels in May 2007.

Little evidence of the motivation or make up of the Niger-based rebels was public by the summer of 2007 aside from the statements released by the MNJ and the Nigerien government. The government of Niger claimed that these attacks were the work of small-scale "bandits" and drug-trafficking gangs, and also suggested "foreign interests" (or the French mining company Areva, specifically) were funding the rebel forces. Three newspapers in Niger which speculated that Libya might be behind the rebel group were threatened with legal action by the Libyan government. On the other hand, the MNJ statements portrayed their movement as Niger-wide (as opposed to Tuareg nationalism) and limited to the demand for economic, political and environmental reforms.

==== Tuareg demands in Niger ====
On 21 December 2007, Ahmed Akoli Akoli, then the political secretary of the MNJ, outlined the group's demands as decentralization and "ethnic balance", a greater share and transparency in the extraction of northern resources, with government and military in the north "recruited from the Tuareg population... and not an army consisting mainly of members of other ethnic clans who serve their own purposes, and who do not identify with the Tuareg people". This seemed to step back from the previous demands for the removal of the current government.

=== Mali ===
Agaly Alambo, from Iferouane in northern Niger, was apparently inspired by the Mali-based Tuareg group May 23, 2006 Democratic Alliance for Change (French: 23 May 2006; Alliance démocratique pour le changement, ADC), ex-combatants who led a short campaign in the north of Mali from May to July 2006, when they signed a peace deal with the Bamako government.

Malian Tuareg former insurgents took part in a long series of peace processes, splintering, and raids between formal peace in 1995 and 2006. The peace deals which ended the 1990s Tuareg insurgency in Mali created a new self-governing region, Kidal Region, and provided opportunities for Malian Tuaregs to join the central government in Bamako and the Malian Armed Forces. Unlike the Niger ex-combatants, who appeared successfully integrated into national the Nigerien Armed Forces, small numbers of Malian Tuaregs remained restive, complaining of the Kidal region's poverty. Some were involved in cross border smuggling, and crime was endemic in the region. A splinter faction of the Tuareg ex-combatants rose as the ADC in 2006. After agreeing to a ceasefire, these forces apparently splintered further in 2007.

Attacks in the extreme northeast of Mali began to grow in number and intensity in August 2007, as reports appeared that the ADC splinter group, led by former combatant Ibrahim Ag Bahanga claimed these attackers had formally confederated with the Niger-based MNJ. The MNJ formally denied this, but witnesses of one kidnapping attack in Mali said the rebels had moved back towards the Niger border. Former Malian rebel leaders, notably the 1990s commander Lyad Ag Ghaly, denounced the 2007 violence and called on the Bahanga group to cease their attacks and offered to negotiate on behalf of the Bamako government.

== Niger 2007 ==
=== February–July ===
After the February 2007 attack on a Nigerian Army detachment in the north of the country that killed 3 soldiers, sporadic attacks occurred around Iférouane, Arlit and Ingall. On 18 April, the MNJ was formally announced as having organised, and attacks picked up in June and July. Landmines on the road between Iférouane and Arlit cut off both towns and threatened the bring the lucrative uranium mining industry to a halt.

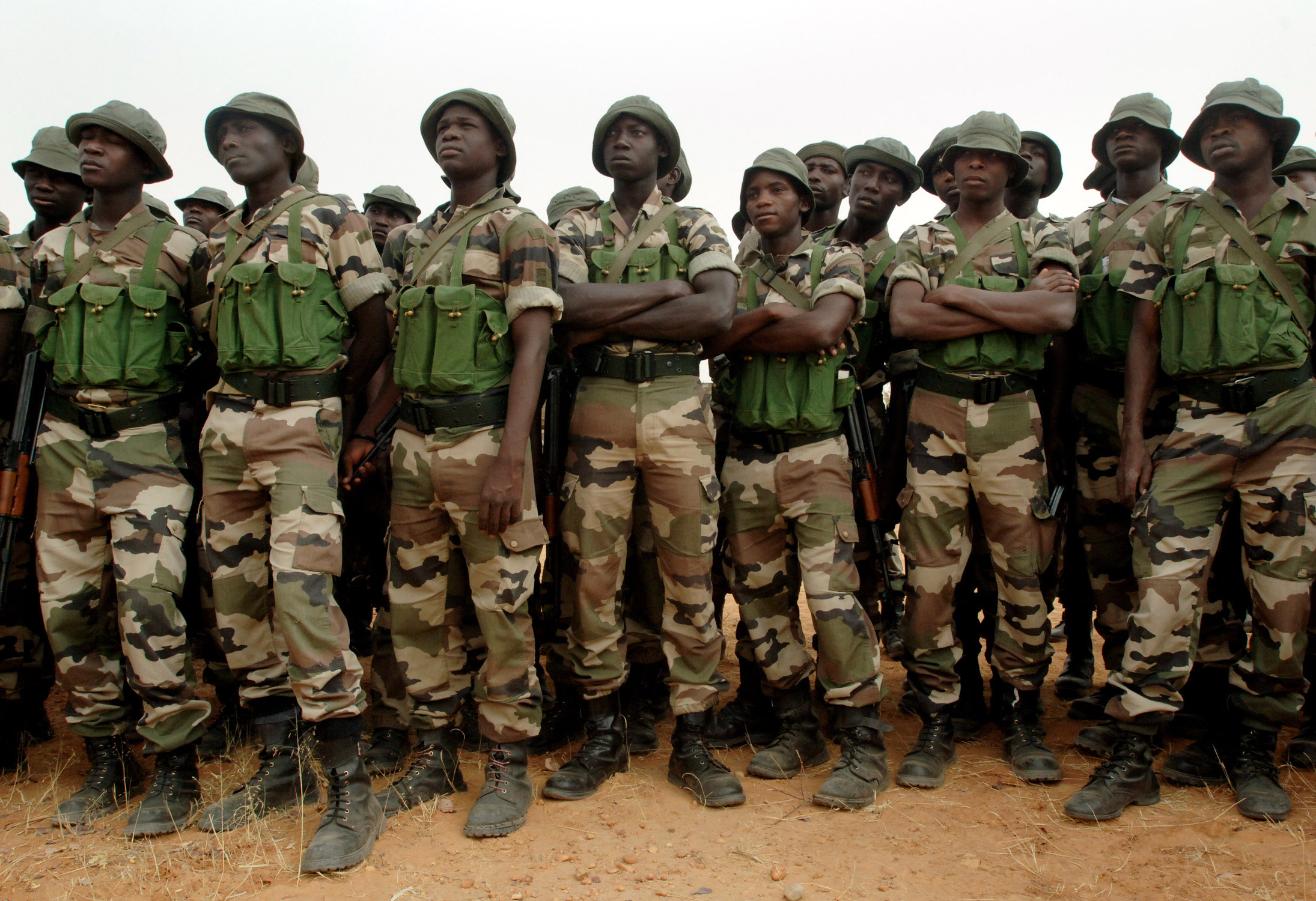
Nigerien soldiers from the 322nd Parachute Regiment, Maradi, Niger, April 2007.

Between 18 and 22 June, Niger experienced the most daring and deadliest attacks to that point in the conflict. MNJ rebels attacked the airport at Agadez, the second most important in the country and a center of Niger's tourism industry, though they did little damage. On 22 June rebels attacked an isolated army post at Tezirzaït, killing 15 soldiers and taking 70 hostages.

=== Uranium mines crises ===
The economy of northern Niger is largely dependent on tourism and uranium mining. While tourism was threatened by the insurgency, uranium mining, which accounts for 16 percent of Niger's GDP and 72 percent of national export proceeds, became of central importance in the conflict.

In October 2006, Tuareg leader Boutali Tchiwerin issued a statement condemning the ecological impact and lack of jobs from the Arlit-based mining industry. The MNJ has echoed these statements repeatedly, and attacked the power station for a mining facility near Arlit in April 2007. In June 2007, land mines were laid on the main route the uranium ore from Arlit takes to the ports of Benin. All of Arlit's ore is processed and transported by a French company Areva NC, a holding of the Areva group, itself a state owned operation of the French Commissariat à l'énergie atomique (CEA). The system of French nuclear power generation, as well as the French nuclear weapons program, is dependent on uranium mined at Arlit.

In June and July 2007, the head of Areva's Niger operations Dominique Pin and his security chief Gilles Denamur, a retired colonel in the French Army and former military attaché to the French embassy in Niger, came into the spotlight. Pin admitted that the April attacks had caused them to cease operations for a month, and his security chief said that landmines prevented ore shipments. The MNJ, on the other hand, claimed that the government had been laying Chinese-made landmines throughout the region.

Tensions between the French company and the government were longstanding. The government of Niger had concluded a deal with a Chinese state owned company China Nuclear International Uranium Corporation (SinoU) to begin mining at Teguida, in the midst of the Tuareg winter pasturing lands and the fall Cure Salee festival at Ingall. The government expected a greater share of the proceeds of these new mines than it has received from the Arlit operations dominated by the former colonial power. More than a dozen prospecting contracts have been offered to companies from Canada and Europe as well, and there are also worries amongst the French that the Arlit mines, nearing the end of their useful life, must soon be replaced by new concessions. Areva has begun work on a new mine outside Arlit, but even prior to this conflict, it was not expected to be operational for a number of years.

On 6 July 2007, an official from Sino-U was kidnapped by the rebels, but later released, and all work at Teguida stopped. Throughout July, the Niger government and Areva came into direct conflict, each accusing the other of supporting the rebels. The French state broadcaster RFI was ejected from the country for a month on 19 July 2007, and in short succession both Pin and Denamur were ordered to leave Niger. On 1 August, the Niamey government announced it would end all contracts with Areva, and bring in the Chinese to manage the existing operations. High level French diplomats flew to Niger and brokered a climb down, in which the Areva contracts would be extended in exchange for greater French aid to Niamey. The French paper Le Monde expressed doubts about this deal, calling it "Expensive uranium."

=== Growing violence ===
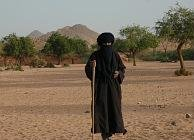
A Tuareg man walks through an abandoned village. The rebellion has scattered civilians deeper into the Aïr Mountains of Niger, or to the regional capital of Agadez. January 2008.

While the situation calmed diplomatically, the attacks by the MNJ escalated and ebbed unpredictably. Iférouane, on the western cusp of the Aïr Mountains, and a center of both Tuareg culture and tourist visits had up to 80 percent of its population moved south by the government in August. The MNJ and the government promised safe access to refugees and aid, and on 4 August, Libyan leader Muammar al-Gaddafi brokered the release of soldiers kidnapped by the MNJ, and the situation appeared to be calming.

Despite that hopeful sign, it appeared that the tourist center of Agadez (well to the southeast of Arlit) could be empty during the fall/winter 2007 tourist season.

On 30 August, the largest tourist air carrier running flights from Europe to Agadez announced it would suspend flights for the 2007 tourist season, and the MNJ released a communique saying the Tuareg Cure Salee festival, which draws increasing numbers of foreign tourists, should be canceled.

On 24 August 2007 Niger's president Mamadou Tandja declared a state of alert in the Agadez Region, giving the security forces extra powers to fight the insurgency. This marks only the third such declaration in the history of the Republic. It was unclear by late September whether the violence had lessened in northern Niger as a result of negotiations with the MNJ, or whether new violence was simply being effectively suppressed. Organisations such as the Committee to Protect Journalists reported the arrest without trial of over 100 northerners in the wake of the declaration, including those who tried to lead a peace march in Agadez. In July, the only daily paper in Agadez was shut down by the government for publishing news of the rebellion, and Bamako based journalists have been similarly threatened. Domestic human rights groups claim there has been an effort to keep foreign journalists from reporting on the crisis in Niger, and this could account for the seeming shift of rebel violence to Mali.

=== Military defections ===
By August 2007 the MNJ claimed defections from the army had increased their numbers to over 2000 fighters. Some sources claim that defections included the entire Niger Rapid Intervention Company, a special forces unit trained by the United States Military to conduct anti-terrorist operations in 2003–2006. There have also been reports that this same unit had been used to guard the mining operations in Arlit by the French mining conglomerate Areva NC, or that it (and the rebel movement) had been created by the government itself in order to ratchet up tension in the region and thereby secure Western military aid.

== Rebel offensives in Mali May 2007 – January 2008 ==
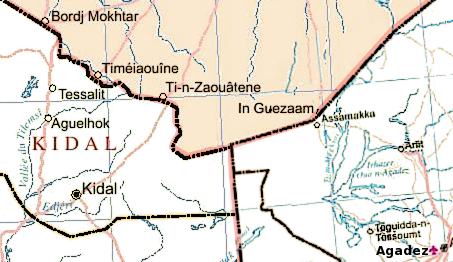
The Mali–Niger–Algeria border region.

=== Early unrest in 2006 ===
In March 2006, Malian army officer Hassan ag Fagaga, of Tuareg origins, defected from his post with a number of his men, also of Tuareg origins. On 17 May, an attack was launched on the Malian Army at Tin Zawaten, near the meeting of the Mali, Algerian, and Niger borders. On 22 May 2006, a number of former Tuareg rebel, including Hassan ag Fagaga and Ibrahim ag Bahanga intensified their campaign with the simultaneous seizing of arms and material from the military bases in Menaka and Kidal, after which the assailants took to the former rebel bases from the 1990s in the Tigharghar mountains of the Kidal region.

=== Upsurge of violence ===
Mali saw the more dramatic upsurge in August 2007, as a spate of attacks began in northeast Mali against members of the Malian military. The Niger-based MNJ said that it has formally allied splinter elements of Tuareg rebel group which has remained on ceasefire since reaching a settlement with the Malian government in July 2007.

On 28 August, Tuareg gunmen captured a military convoy 50 km from the town of Tinsawatene, near the border with Algeria.

Both the Malian government and the general populace appeared shocked by the level of violence in the north of Kidal, Ménaka and the Sahel region, as well as by the effectiveness of the rebel force, which the government claimed was led by Ibrahim ag Bahanga, a Malian Armed Forces officer of Tuareg origins who had deserted early in the summer of 2007. The government also claimed that rebel forces were involved in organized crime and drug smuggling.

Bahanga, a former rebel from the May 2006 and 1990 insurgencies, announced on 31 August that his group would negotiate with the government, and intermediaries from former Tuareg rebel groups headed by 1990s commander Iyad Ag Ghaly, as well as Libyan leader Muammar Gaddafi, offered to mediate. At the same time, former rebel commander—and father-in-law of Bahanga—Hama Ag Sidahmed announced the creation of a Niger-Mali Tuareg alliance (the Alliance-Touareg-Niger-Mali, ATNM), though this was denied by another group, claiming to represent the ARC.

On 13 September, a United States military aircraft was fired on by Tuareg rebels at Tin-Zaouatene, Mali, where the town remained surrounded by rebel forces for at least four days. A C-130 aircraft was air-dropping supplies to Malian troops when it was hit, but returned safely to base. United States officials did not say if they would continue to re-supply the Malian Army, but one official said the "occurrence was not regular". The same reports also alleged that several unnamed army posts in the far northeast were similarly surrounded. The international press reported that Tin-Zaouatene was being reinforced by the Malian army on 18 September, and that the rebels had withdrawn.

At the same time, a series of storms hit the Sahel region, running all the way to Ethiopia. These storms caused unusually severe flooding and damage and endangered those internally displaced by the conflict in Mali and Niger, as well as displaced persons fleeing other conflicts in Chad, Darfur and Ethiopia.

=== Seasonal constraints ===
Any military action in the Sahel region is constrained by the tropical rain cycles, with the May to September rainy season making communication and transport in the region south of the Sahara difficult at the best of times. Both the Malian and Niger conflicts peaked during the dry season on 2007–2008, beginning at the end of 2007 and ending in May 2008. Major conflict in Mali spiked in August and September 2007 as the rains ended and pastoralists moved their herds. Following the siege of Kidal, fighting remained sporadic in Mali after the beginning of 2008, but continued heavily in Niger. As the dry season began, unusual rains struck Mali and Niger with particular ferocity. As a result, the governments of the two nations began to take markedly different strategies for confronting the Tuareg rebellion.

=== March–July 2008 rebel offensive ===
In March 2008, Mali again saw an upsurge in attacks committed by fragments of former Tuareg combatant groups in the far-northeastern Kidal region. The Malian government, along with Tuareg leaders who had kept the 2006 ceasefire, pushed both a military and diplomatic strategy. In March, Muammar Gaddafi of Libya negotiated the release of Malian army prisoners held by the rebels, and sporadic talks were held with Libyan mediation. Malian armed forces remained in control of all the major settlements, but Malian rebels staged a series of raids, the largest taking place at the end of March. Rebel forces attacked a convoy near Abeibara in the east, killing 7 and capturing 20 soldiers and four military vehicles. On 4 April ceasefire and prisoner exchange was negotiated again through Libya, but each side accused the others of failing to end hostilities, and more sporadic attacks on Army positions occurred in May.

In early June, rebels killed 25 soldiers in an attack on a Kidal base, and in late June the Malian Army killed 20 rebels near the Algerian border, which the army claimed was home to a major rebel base. But just days later, President Amadou Toumani Touré announced that he remained open to negotiations with the Tuareg rebels, while at the same time agreeing to a joint-security deal with Algeria.

On 18 July, rebels overran a military post at Tessalit, taking 20 prisoners in addition to many supplies.

== August 2008 ceasefire ==
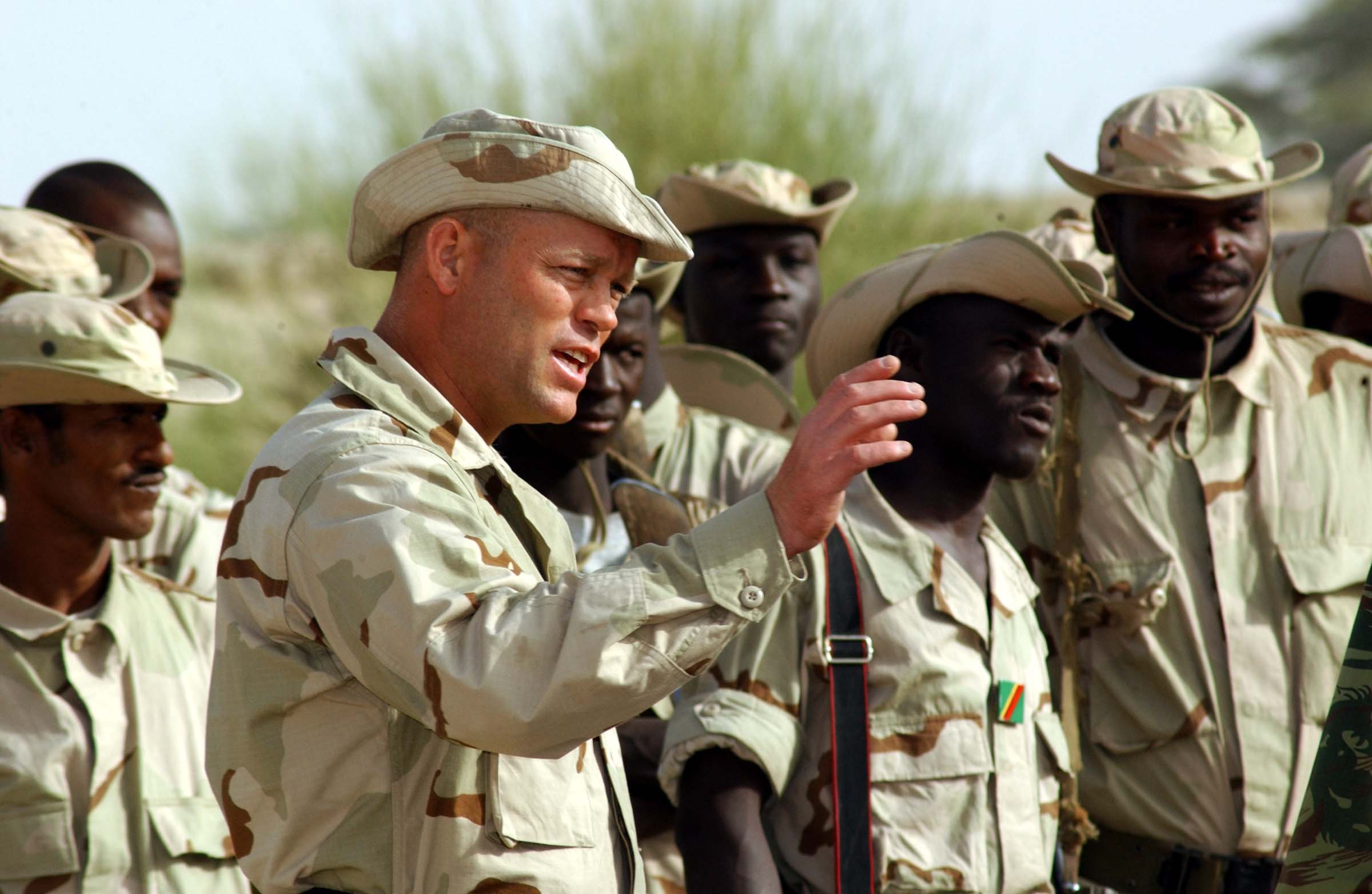
A United States 10th Special Forces Group soldier training Malian Armed Forces, 2004. The United States aided in the resupply of Malian forces during the siege of Kidal.

In Mali, where the government combined military reinforcement of northern towns with diplomatic efforts using Malian Tuareg intermediaries, attacks subsided. Mali, continuing to suffer from flooding in the south, as well as global hikes in food prices, turned to international support, especially from Algeria, and seemed eager to engage domestic Tuaregs who continued to honor the 2006 cease-fire. The high-profile support of former rebel leader Iyad Ag Ghaly as a mediator by the Malian government led many to believe that low-scale fighting with those Tuareg factions who had renounced the 2006 accords might end completely. The Malian government also called on neighboring Algeria to help negotiate peace, patrol the deserted border region, and resupply its northern military bases

On 18 July, just two days after rebels overran a military post, a peace deal was announced, revealing that Algeria had been hosting talks between the government of Mali and the leadership of the "Alliance démocratique du 23 mai".

The Algerian ambassador to Mali, Abdelkrim Ghrieb, had negotiated the deal, between Amada Ag Bibi (a Malian Tuareg Deputy in the Malian National Assembly) for the rebels and General Kafougouna Koné, Malian Minister of the Interior, for the Malian government. 92 prisoners held by the rebels would be released, amnesties were promised for rebels, and re-integration into the military along the lines of the 2006 deal was promised for Tuareg fighters. This agreement held throughout 2008, and by the end of the year the Malian conflict seemed resolved.

This was also a success for Algeria as a regional power, and rival of the Libyan government for influence in the Sahara. Throughout the process, the Malian government, as well as Tuareg leaders on both sides of the conflict, publicly pushed for a negotiated settlement, in contrast with the Nigerien conflict. Cherif Ouazani was quoted in Algeria as describing the talks as "Malians talking to Malians" While the last of the rebel-held prisoners were released in August, and the ceasefire held as of the end of that month, there continued to be speculation on the role played by presumed Mai 23 leader Ibrahim Ag Bahanga, who had not participated in the Algerian sponsored tripartite talks. Press speculation theorised a split in the already fractured movement, in which Toureg groups loyal to the Kel Adagh had fully participated in the eventual peace process, which seemed to have resolved the conflict since August 2008. Meanwhile, a smaller group around Ag Bahanga had been holding out for Libyan-sponsored mediation, and eventually abandoned the talks and sought refuge in Libya.

== Continued conflict in Niger: late 2007 to mid-2008 ==
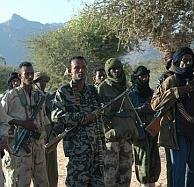
A group of Nigerien rebel fighters in northern Niger, January–February 2008. Some wear United States style desert camouflage distributed to Malian Armed forces.

=== Escalating violence and humanitarian crisis ===
In Niger, the government strategy was to continue military pressure on the MNJ, declaring them criminal gangs with whom they will have no negotiations. As the MNJ was apparently the larger and more organized of the two rebel forces, much of the northern regions of the country remained under emergency decrees.

=== Aid and press barred ===
Press and international aid agencies complained that they had been prevented from monitoring the situation or delivering aid as both sides in the fighting reported that the conflict was continuing to escalate. Humanitarian agencies in Niamey estimated in early December that there were around 11,000 people displaced by the fighting, in addition to the 9,000 Nigeriens who lost their homes in heavy flooding. Doctors Without Borders claimed that no aid was being delivered by the government in the north, while 2,500 to 4,000 displaced people were estimated to have come to Agadez from the mostly Tuareg town of Iferouane, with the entire civilian population apparently fleeing after the army and rebels started fighting in the area in mid-2007. Humanitarian sources were quoted saying that the army was operating with little control and adding to—rather than suppressing—banditry, drug-trafficking and lawlessness in the north.

=== Anti-terror law ===
In April 2008 the National Assembly of Niger passed a new anti-terror law giving broader powers of detention to the police and military. The law also strengthened penalties on a wide range offenses, including the manufacture or possession of explosive devices, hostage-taking, attacks on transport and unlawful possession of radioactive materials.

=== Mine attacks in south ===
The Nigerien government reported that the MNJ began mine attacks against civilians in the southern towns of Tahoua, Dosso and Maradi, areas previously far from the fighting. The MNJ denied targeting civilians, and made counter claims that government militia had continued indiscriminate attacks on Tuareg communities in the north. Western press sources claimed that the rebels were responsible for laying mines that hit Army vehicles, as well as a spike in mines laid in populated areas. On 9 January 2008, the first violence was reported in Niamey, the capital, some 1,000 miles (1,600 km) from the conflict zone. Abdou Mohamed Jeannot, the director of Niger's first independent radio station, Radio R & M (Radio and Music) was killed after driving over a landmine in Yantala, a suburb west of Niamey. Mahamane, who was also the vice president of the national press association, Maison de la Presse, was not reported to have been vocal on the conflict, but his radio station had been banned by the government in 1998, and rebroadcasts western news reports in Niger, where western reporters have been highly restricted by the government and Radio France was accused by the government (July 2007) of siding with the rebels. The neighborhood is also reported to house many Army officers (which might conceivably have made it a target for the rebels), and another mine was found some 200m from the blast site. The government blamed the MNJ. The government's press chief Ben Omar Mohammed called on the population to set up "vigilance brigades" to fight against "these new types of assassins". The MNJ denied the attack, and said it blamed "Niger army militias".

=== Continued clashes ===
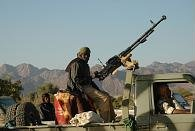
A Nigerien rebel fighter mans a gun in northern Niger, from the Niger Movement for Justice. January- February 2008.

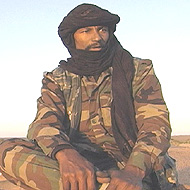
Rebel armed forces leader Amoumene Kalakouawa fought in the last Tuareg uprising during the 1990s. He says the state still neglects nomads despite a decade-old peace deal. April 2008 (VOA).

A 9 December clash in the Tiguidit escarpment area (south of In-Gall and east of Agadez) was reported by both sides as resulting in civilian casualties. The government reported that army forces fired on civilian vehicles who wandered into fighting with MNJ units who had been ambushed laying mines. The MNJ countered that government militias attacked a civilian convoy, killing a number of civilians, including two Libyan foreign workers.

On 21 January, both sides reported an attack by the MNJ on the town of Tanout, 150 km north of Zinder, in which seven were killed and 11 kidnapped. The rebels claimed they had captured several high-ranking officers of the FNIS (Nigerien Internal Security Forces – paramilitary police) and the Prefect of Tanout.

==== Ethnic expansion ====
At the beginning of January, MNJ rebels claimed they had been joined by ethnic Toubou rebel leaders and several Hausa army officers. While there was no independent confirmation of this, the Toubou Revolutionary Armed Forces of the Sahara (French: Forces armées révolutionnaires du Sahara, FARS) had risen against the government in the 1990s (see Tuareg Rebellion) in the far southeast of Niger. The MNJ claimed the former FARS commander Bocar Mohamed Sougouma, (alias Warabé) had ordered former rebels to rally to the MNJ-controlled Tamgak Plateau near Iferaouane.

By December 2007, fighting had begun to spiral out of control, ending the nascent tourist industry in the Aïr Mountains, and destabilising areas of Niger not directly involved in the insurgency of the 1990s.

=== Niger: international support ===
Despite the series of escalating attacks, the government of Niger offered a number of concessions to foreign (especially French) interests in January 2008. Two French journalists, arrested on charges of espionage and aiding the rebels on 17 December, were formally charged with threatening state security and released on bail 18 January, to face trial later. French press reports that Gabonese President Omar Bongo Ondimba intervened with President Mamadou Tandja on their behalf. It was also reported that President Bouteflika of Algeria had been in offering security guarantees to Niger. At the same time, the government of Niger renewed Uranium contracts with the French government controlled Areva, obtaining a 50% increase in payments to the Nigerien state. This comes at a time when security concerns have made the diminishing mines at Arlit impossible to operate, and construction of their new mine near Ingal—scheduled to be complete in 2010 yet still not begun—extremely unlikely.

=== Niger: February – June 2008 ===
Beginning in February and March 2008, mine attacks in the south ended, major rebel incursions out of Aïr and the desert regions subsided, and the Nigerien military went on the offensive, retaking a major rebel position in the far northwest. The rebels launched a daring raid into the Areva facilities in Arlit, seizing four French hostages. International human rights groups condemned the move, and the four were released to the Red Cross. While the Nigerien Armed Forces have staged attacks in the Aïr, there appeared to be a stalemate.

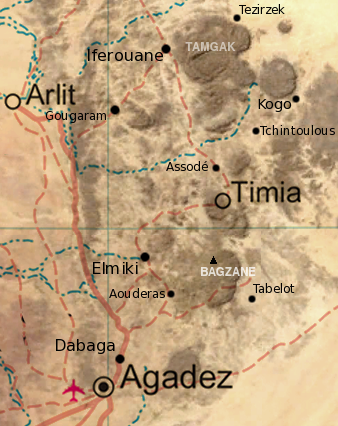
Map of the southern Aïr Mountains.

== Niger offensive of mid-2008 and renewed stalemate ==
Nigerien rebels have reported air attacks on their bases in the mountains, but major fighting calmed.

=== Areva kidnappings ===
On 22 June, the MNJ launched a raid on the outskirts of Arlit, capturing five people, including four European employees of the Areva uranium mining company. They were released to the Red Cross in Agadez on the 25th.

=== Army retakes Tezirzaït ===
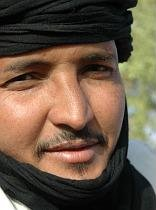
MNJ rebel Vice President Acharif Ag Mohamed El Moctar, killed in a Nigerien Army offensive at Tezirzaït, June 2008.

Also in late June, the military of Niger launched a major offensive at Tezirzaït to the north of the Tamgak plateau. There, at a desert army outpost which had been seized by the rebels in June 2007, a combined ground and air operation retook these positions and killed a number of MNJ fighters, including Rebel Vice President Acharif Ag Mohamed El Moctar. The MNJ claimed the fighting had produced heavy losses on the government side as well, saying that 26 soldiers had been killed, along with several vehicles, including a MIG helicopter, had been destroyed.

=== Stalemate ===
As Niger edged towards the 2008 rainy season, the MNJ rebels discounted reports that they had begun a ceasefire, but fighting was sporadic, occurring around the rebel strongholds of the Tamgak Plateau near Iferaouane. The Nigerien government and the MNJ issued dramatically different accounts, but neither side described fighting as either decisive, particularly long lasting, or outside the Aïr plateau.

=== State of emergency continues ===
On 20 August, the government of Niger renewed its state of emergency in the Agadez Region, in place for more than a year, which places great limits on public gatherings, press and personal speech, movement, while giving broad powers of detention and seizure to the government.

=== Reports of ceasefire discounted ===
On 19 August 2008, it was announced by the Nigerien television broadcast someone they claimed to be rebel leader Aghaly ag Alambo, announcing that the Tuareg would lay down arms in both Mali and Niger following a peace brokered by Libya. The MNJ later discounted this as a hoax. This was likely a film of Malian rebel leader Ibrahim Ag Bahanga discussing the April peace talks with the Malian government in Libya, hence the reference to Malian leadership and Colonel Muammar Gaddafi. The current peace deal in the Malian conflict took place in July under the auspices of Libya's regional rival Algeria. Aghaly ag Alambo released a statement saying that although they were willing to engage in peace negotiations, they would not lay down their arms unilaterally, and the Malian and Nigerien rebels cannot speak for one another.

=== Sougouma surrender ===
In late August, the Nigerien government reported that a faction of the MNJ led by Toubou rebel commander from the 1990s Bocar Mohamed Sougouma had surrendered near Gouré (Zinder Region). In the process, they report, an accidental explosion of landmines which were being handed into the government killed one and wounded two, including Zinder Region Governor Yahaya Yandaka. The MNJ claimed that Bocar Mohamed Sougouma, (alias Warabé) had joined the rebellion with a group of former Toubou rebels in January 2008, but that the MNJ had suspected him of being a government agent, and banished him in June 2008 from their bases on the Tamgak Plateau near Iferaouane. The MNJ denied from the beginning of 2008 the use of landmines, while the government charged the rebels with widespread attacks on civilians by indiscriminate use of landmines as far south as Niamey.

=== November fighting ===
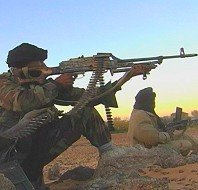
Rebels with the Movement of Nigeriens for Justice, published April 2008, likely taken January 2008 (Voice of America).

The heaviest fighting reported through the end of the year occurred in November. The MNJ claimed that they repulsed a concerted attempt by the FAN to establish a base near the town of Elmiki between 12 and 16 November. The rebels claimed to have killed 8 and wounded at least two dozen Nigerien soldiers, destroyed vehicles, and driven the FAN out of the area. The MNJ further claimed that the Nigerien government had arrested six civilians and destroyed civilian property in the mainly Tuareg village of Elmiki, which they called an attempt at ethnic cleansing. The MNJ further claimed seven men from the village had been arrested on 19 October and later found dead. They claimed in early December that the state of emergency in the north was used by the government to cover up attacks on civilians and clashes between MNJ and army troops.

The Nigerien government denied that any fighting or any attacks on civilians took place in Elmeki. The government did, however, confirm that an MNJ raid on a convoy between Elmiki and Dabaga killed four soldiers, and that a landmine attack in the desert between Agadez and Bilma occurred later; both incidents were blamed on continued activity of so-called criminal gangs involved in smuggling and intimidation. The MNJ, for their part, claimed at least two more attacks on army convoys during the month of November.

== 2009: Nigerien uranium industry unhindered ==
Despite the violence in the Aïr Massif, Areva NC and the Nigerien government were, by late 2008, unhindered in their exploitation of the Arlit uranium mines and in the transport of uranium by highway to ports in Benin. At the beginning of 2009, Niger and the French state mining company agreed on a deal to build the Imouraren mine near Arlit. At a projected output of five thousand tonnes of ore a year, it would be largest uranium mine in the world by 2012, as the SOMAIR and COMINAK mines were to be phased out. The deal would make Niger the second largest uranium producer in the world, and included plans to construct a civil nuclear power station for Niger. While Areva officials earlier in the year admitted that the security situation made it impossible to prospect at night, and that the fighting had frightened off prospecting for new sites, the operations of the mines were, by December, unaffected by the Tuareg rebellion. Despite the awarding of nearly 100 prospecting contracts to firms other than Areva in 2007, the high-profile Chinese and Canadian projects were not yet formalised as of 2009.

== Rhissa Ag Boula and the FFR splinter ==
In January 2008, Rhissa Ag Boula, the most prominent of the remaining leaders of the 1990s rebellion, reappeared in the press. In France, he was interviewed by le Nouvel Observateur as a spokesperson for the MNJ, stating that a "Battle of Uranium" was soon to be launched by the rebels against the Arlit-based French mining company Areva. The MNJ did not publish or respond to Ag Boula's statement, and he had not previously spoken for the group. No attack on the Areva installations was immediately forthcoming, and observers noted that while attacks took place in early 2007 and in June 2008, the MNJ had largely refrained from attacking both of the mining operations, as well as the economically critical transport of Uranium ore over the highways.

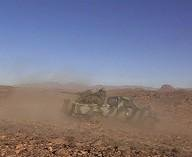
MNJ rebels shown in desert combat by a press photographer, near Aïr Mountains in January 2008.

Ag Boula had been one of two prominent Rebel leaders (along with Mano Dayak) brought into the Nigerien government after the end of the 1990s rebellion. In the 1990s, he had coordinated a dozen rebel factions in the FLAA (Front de Libération de l'Azawak et de l'Aïr) and then signed the peace deal with the Niamey authorities on their behalf. Afterwards, he headed his own political party, the UDPS (Union pour la démocratie et le progrès social) Ag Boula was appointed in December 1997 as Minister of Tourism and Artisanal Affairs until he was charged with ordering the death of a political rival in 2004, a charge he claimed was a political fabrication. Released after 13 months in prison without charge, Ag Boula largely disappeared from public life, but remained one of the most well-known Tuareg figures in Niger. After his public support for the MNJ came out, it was speculated by African journalists that Ag Boula represented a faction close to the Libyan government.

On 30 May, Ag Boula released a statement which claimed that a faction of MNJ fighters had broken from the movement. This group, the Front des Forces de redressement, created an official website, but fewer than half a dozen press releases were released over the next six months, and no attacks or operations by this new group were reported. The aging Mohamed Awtchiki Kriska, a former spokesperson for the 1990s Coordination de la résistance armée (CRA) rebel front, was announced as the president of the new group, and Ag Boula was named as "Commissioner of War". Kriska had only joined the MNJ in November 2007. One writer on Tuareg affairs speculated that the group, because of the familial ties of its leaders, might have close relationships with Libyan Tuaregs. One journalist speculated that Ag Boula's faction might be in Libya of along the Malian border, postulating a close relationship with Ibrahim Ag Bahanga's faction of the Malian rebels, who, after walking out on peace talks with the Malian government, relocated to Libya.

The MNJ did not publicly comment on the creation of this faction, but they did announce the removal of two members of its European support network: Chehna Ag Hamate and Kaocen Seydou Maïga. Other former rebel leaders from the 1990s condemned Ag Boula's statements.

In April 2008, the government of Niger requested that Ag Boula be extradited by the French government; however, by this time, he was no longer in France. The Nigerien courts convicted him of planning the murder of a ruling party activist, for which he had been arrested in 2004, but released without charge in 2005. His supporters believed at the time that the 2004 arrest was planned to induce a rebellion among Ag Boula's supporters. Ag Boula's brother subsequently led a 2005 raid on a Nigerien military patrol which killed ten. The conviction took place in absentia in a trial on 12–13 July 2008.

Ag Boula released a statement condemning the verdict, but disappeared from press reports soon thereafter. Reporters at the time speculated he was either in Europe or Libya.

On Sunday 14 December 2008, a Canadian UN official was kidnapped while traveling on a highway just 40 km north of Niamey, well away from any previous rebel attacks. The MNJ denied involvement, but a statement attributed to Ag Boula took responsibility for the kidnapping in the name of the FFR. Mohamed Awtchiki Kriska, on the other hand, denied that the FFR was responsible. Previous kidnappings acknowledged by the MNJ in the conflict—those of a Chinese mining executive in 2007, a Nigerien parliamentarian and Red Cross head, a Nigerien Prefect, and four Areva officials, all in 2008—were all quickly resolved.

== Impact on Nigerien press freedom ==
A consequence of the conflict in Niger was a series of arrests of domestic journalists, and expulsions or closings of foreign press and aid groups. The state of emergency in the Agadez Region, re-authorised every six months since November 2007, has barred foreign press or aid from the area. In mid-2008, the French charity Doctors without borders (MSF) was forced to close a childhood malnutrition treatment program in Maradi Region which had been operating since 2005. MSF was subsequently ejected from the country by the Nigerien government. The rebroadcasting of foreign radio broadcasts in Niger has been interupped several times since mid-2007 by government order. Nigerien journalists say they are often pressured by local authorities. The north, under a state of emergency, has become off-limits to both domestic and foreign press, and the independent Radio Agadez in the north has been closed by the government.

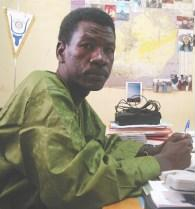
Nigerien journalist Moussa Kaka was arrested and held for over a year by the government for interviewing MNJ leaders.

Since mid-2007, there have been a number of arrests of foreign and local journalists. Two local journalists were imprisoned in 2007 under charge of aiding the Tuareg insurgency in the north, and several radio stations have been closed. The journalist Moussa Kaka was held over a year on charges stemming from a radio interview of Rebel leaders, before being provisionally released. Kaka has been at the center of a campaign in France and elsewhere demanding his freedom, spearheaded by Radio France International and its CEO Alain de Pouzilhac, Reporters Without Borders (both organisations for which Kaka is Niger Correspondent) and Amnesty International, as well as Nigerien press groups including The Nigerien National Union of Press Workers (SYNATIC) and Le Republicain newspaper. Despite his release, several journalists remain jailed for alleged contact with the rebels, and at least three radio stations (Nigeriens main source of news) have been closed by the authorities.

While Kaka received the longest imprisonment for a journalist since the beginning of the rebellion, several other cases have come to the attention of the international media. French journalists Thomas Dandois and Pierre Creisson were detained in Agadez for a month in 2007 by Nigerien military forces before being released. The editor of Niamey's L'Evénement weekly was arrested on 30 July 2008 and charged with "divulging a defence secret" after reporting that an army officer had been linked to an arms cache that was discovered in the capital. The government press regulation body, the High Council for Communication (CSC), closed Niamey-based TV and radio station Dounia TV for one month in August 2008, and closed Sahara FM, the main radio station in Agadez, for an indefinite period on 22 April 2008 for broadcasting interviews with people who had claimed they were the victims of abuses by government troops. In June 2007, Agadez weekly Aïr-Info was closed by the government for three months, while at the same time sending formal warnings to three other newspapers (Libération, L'Opinion and L'Evènement) for reporting on the conflict in the north, which the government said were "trying to justify criminal activity and violence". Aïr-Info editor Ibrahim Manzo Diallo, after attempting to open a new weekly paper, was arrested and released. One of his reporters was also arrested in Ingal in October, and Diallo was again arrested in October while trying to board a flight to Europe aon charges of "membership of a criminal gang". Diallo was released pending trial in February 2008.

== Mali December 2008: Ag Bahanga's return ==
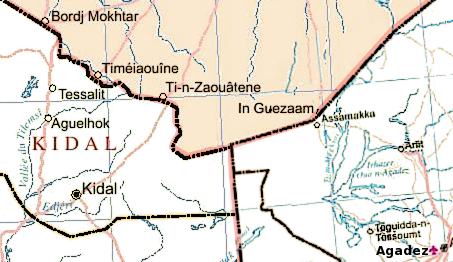
The Mali–Niger–Algeria border region.

Sometime before the beginning of December 2008, Ibrahim Ag Bahanga returned from his self-imposed exile in Libya. Ag Bahanga is the former leader of the 23 Mai (l'Alliance Démocratique du 23 mai pour le Changement, ADC) group and current leader of the last remaining faction of the group which had not signed the Algerian brokered peace agreement: The Alliance Touaregue Nord Mali Pour Le Changement (ATNMC) This faction took credit in communiqués for a series of attacks in northern Mali beginning on 18 December.

=== Nampala attack ===
On 20 December, rebels attacked a desert garrison post at Nampala 500 km (310 mi) north of Bamako near the Mauritanian border. Between 11 and 20 Malian Armed Forces soldiers were killed along with an unknown number of rebels in the bloodiest fighting since June 2007. The attack was prefaced by the killing of an aide to a pro-government Tuareg leader in Gao in a grenade attack on the politician's home on 18 December.

The ATNMC released communiqués claiming that their patrols had destroyed two Army vehicles far south into the populated regions of Mali, on the Kati–Diéma–Nioro road and the Ségou to Tombouctou road on 24 and 25 December. There was no government confirmation of these attacks.

The attack on Nampala pushed the fighting far to the south. The President of Mali, Amadou Toumani Touré, vowed harsh action in a speech at Kayes: "Enough is enough. We cannot continue to suffer, we cannot keep counting our dead... We cannot keep searching for peace... They are firing on anything that moves. They are firing on soldiers, they're firing on civilians, what does all this mean?" He claimed that while Nampala had no strategic importance, it was "close to the different routes and paths that take drugs across the Sahara-Sahel strip". This was a reiteration of the government contention that elements of the rebels were motivated not by political motives, but by their supposed involvement in the lucrative Saharan smuggling trade.

In this same period, a group of foreign tourists were seized in southeastern Mali by unknown captors. Ag Bahanga denied any involvement. He had previously claimed Islamist GSPC militants were active "north of Timbuktu", and that his forces were "in a state of war" with the GSPC. Some Malian sources initially blamed the kidnapping on Ag Bahanga's forces.

== Mali 2009: offensive and peace deal ==
=== Army assault in north ===
The Malian army quickly responded in January 2009 with an attack on a rebel camp just west of Aguelhoc (In the Adrar des Ifoghas, Kidal Region) in which it said it killed 20 fighters and took 8 prisoners, one of whom later died. El Khabar of Algeria reported that the initial assaults by the Malian Army in January were led by former ADC fighters and commanded by a former associate of Ag Bahanga's Colonel Mohamed Oueld Midou. Other Malian press reports claimed that the Malian forces were led by Arab militias recruited by the government. One editorial in Le Republican (Bamako) argued that this, along with the growing resurgence of former Ghanda Koy militia activities in Gao risked adding a greater ethnic dimension to the conflict.

On 22 January, the Malian armed forces claimed to have destroyed Ag Bahanga's main base at Tinsalak (near Tigharghar and to the east of Tessalit), killing 31 and capturing 8. The attack, unlike the previous assault, was reported to have been carried out by regular units of the armed forces. Special forces units of the Malian military (Echelon tactique inter-arme, ETIA) were led by Kidal Region military commander, Colonel El Hadji Gamou, but also drafting in Col Sidi Ahmed Kounta, commanding the ETIA Léré, Commandant Barek from ETIA Gao and Colonel Takini head of the ETIA Kidal coordinated a series of attacks on suspected rebel positions in Kidal Region through 5 February.

Facing these setbacks, the ATNM made a series of concessions to the government. On 25 January they released the final three Malian soldiers they had held, and requested the government release seven ATNM fighters. On 2 February, Amed Ag Oussouf—reputedly Ibrahim Ag Bahanga's lieutenant—called on the government to accept Algerian mediation and an immediate cease fire. The group had previously rejected an Algerian peace deal accepted by the remainder of the ADC, and on 25 January, Ag Bahanga had told an Algerian paper that their only alternative was armed conflict. The Malian Armed Forces stated on that same day that they would not engage in talks with Ag Bahanga's fighters, describing them as "bandits". Malian forces set up a forward base in the Kidal Region and say they have killed 31 ATNM fighters since 22 January.

On 6 February, the Malian Armed Forces claimed they had taken the last of the ATNMC positions, while Ag Bahanga and an unknown number of fighters had crossed the border into Algeria.

=== Malian faction split ===
January 2009 also appeared to also have marked the final break between Ag Bahanga's faction and the remainder of the ADC. According to the 2006 and 2008 Algiers Accords, the ADC elements on cease fire were headquartered in Kidal, both the political leadership, and the former fighters integrated in their own units of the Malian Armed forces.

Outside observers noted the weakness of Bahanga's position, with his surprise return to fighting in December resulting in political isolation from both the ADC and foreign mediators, military defeat at the hands of the army, and a string of defections which left his forces even weaker.

In mid January, the former Ag Bahanga faction military commander, Lt. Col. Hassane Fagaga, returned to ceasefire and cantonment near Kidal. According to the Malian military, Fagaga came into cantonment with 400 ADC fighters. On 26 January, Fagaga and the remained of the cease-fire ADC announced that they would transfer their headquarters and bases south of Kidal. With all other ADC forces remaining on ceasefire, it was unclear how many fighters chose to remain with Ag Bahanga and his ATNMC faction, especially as the faction itself claimed in late 2007 to have no more than 165 men under arms. On 6 February, the Malian Armed Forces claimed they had taken the last of the ATNMC positions, while Ag Bahanga and an unknown number of fighters had crossed the border into Algeria.

=== Rebels dispose arms ===
On 5 February, the Malian Armed forces concluded negotiations for 180 of the ADC fighters, all former Malian Armed Forces deserters, to re-enter the cantonment area at Camp Kidal. These fighters maintained control of their arms. The government, rebels and Algerian interlocutors held off on a final agreement that would bring the remaining 220 or more rebels into cantonment. The tripartite Groupe Technique de Sécurité, set up under the 2008 accord, would negotiate the movement of rebel forces into disarmament, possible reintegration into security services, and final cantonment at a base near Agharous, 50 km (31 mi) south of Kidal.

Former ADC fighters continued to move in cantonment areas, be processed by the military, and dispose their arms in stages through early June 2009.

== Niger: 2009 peace talks ==
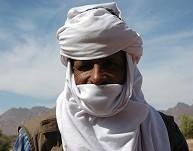
Vice Mayor of Iferouane Niger, Mohamed Houma. His town was largely abandoned by civilians from mid-2007 to 2009.

=== Malian model ===
Movement towards peace in Niger, which seemed unlikely at the beginning of 2009, progressed rapidly following the Malian peace deal. The taking of hostages by the AQIM in Niger, especially Canadian diplomat Robert Fowler, brought intense international interest in the security situation in Niger. Beginning in February 2009, there was intensive involvement with the Nigerien government and the rebel groups by the UN, Canada, and later by Algeria and Mali, and finally Libya. Canadian and other sources floated rumors of Tuareg rebel and even Nigerien government involvement in the kidnappings, which all sides united to deny. Malian and Algerian government mediators, as well as informal groups representing Tuareg interests and the Nigerien government met at a Malian organised conference in Niamey on 25 and 26 February. Press in Bamako and Niamey began to talk of the "Malian Approach" to peace.

=== MNJ split ===
On 2 March, as series of dramatic events occurred on the side of the Nigerien rebels. A group of most of the named MNJ leadership and their European based supporters announced they had broken from the MNJ. The Nigerien Patriotic Front (French: Front Patriotique Nigérien, FPN) announced that MNJ leader Aghali Alambo had fled from the MNJ encampment with all but one of the remaining FAN prisoners. The remainder of the MNJ leadership announced that they were forming the FPN, and announced in their first statement their desire for direct peace talks with the government and a ceasefire. The FPN announced leadership consisted of much of the MNJ, with former Agadez NGO head and rebel Aklou Sidi Sidi as president, former Nigerien military officer and MNJ military commander Kindo Zada announcing his support from a previously unannounced exile in N'Djamena, and former MNJ spokesman Boutali Tchiwerin as the spokesman of the new organisation. The 2008 MNJ splinter, the FPR (Front of Forces for Rectification) headed by Rhissa Ag Boula and Mohamed Aoutchiki Kriska, later announced they would join with the new FPN peace initiative. Agli Alambo for his part announced from Libya that the MNJ were seeking immediate peace talks under Libyan auspices, and would repatriate their prisoners to Niamey.

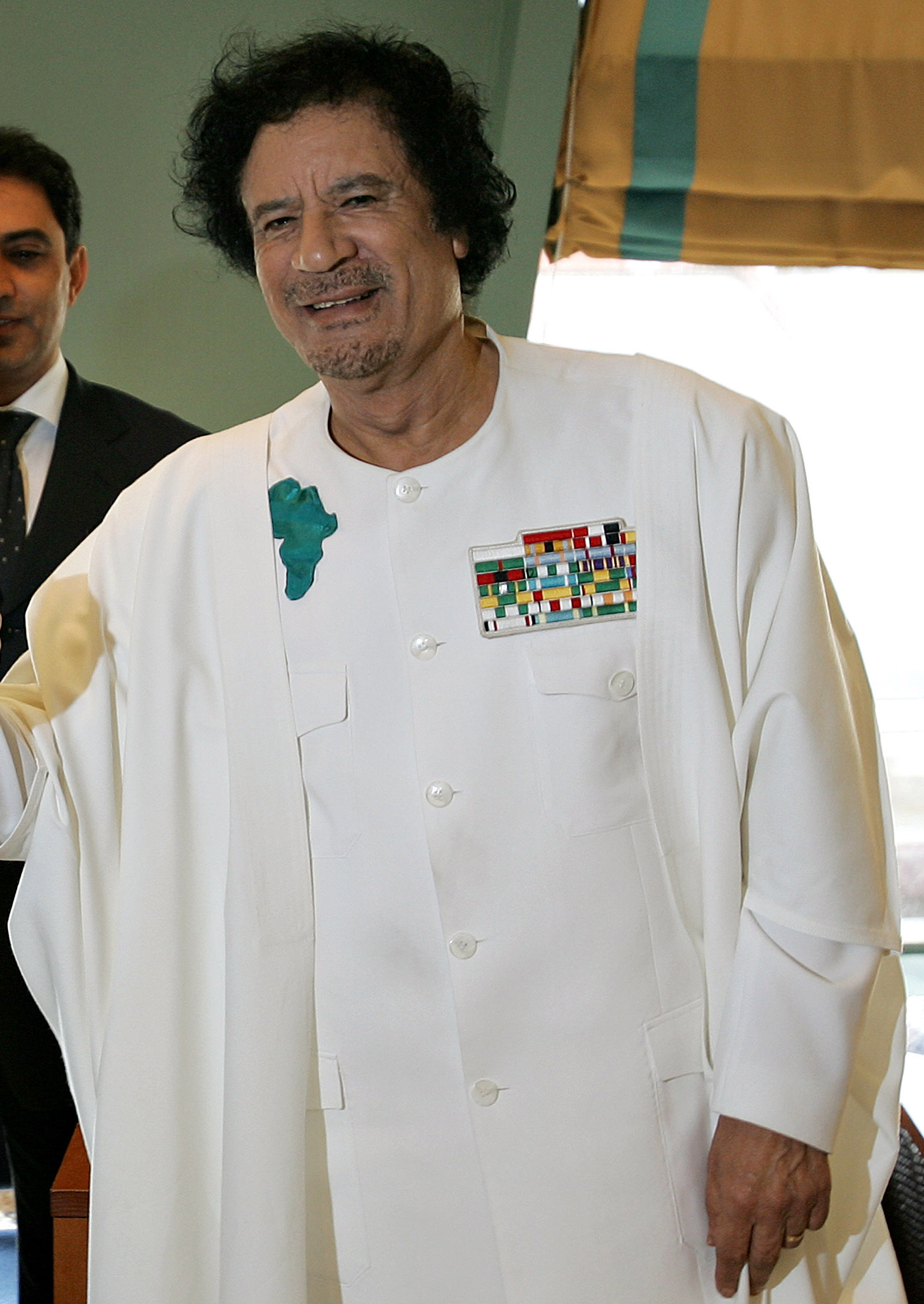
Libyan leader Muammar al-Gaddafi made several personal interventions in both the Malian and Nigerien conflicts, providing refuge for Malian rebels in 2008 and 2009, and serving as an emissary during the 2009 Niger ceasefire talks.

Muammar al-Gaddafi accompanied six former prisoners to Niamey, where they were repatriated to the Nigerien government on 13 March. On 15 March Gaddafi called on all rebel groups in Niger to lay down arms, and pledged his help to prevent smuggling and lawlessness in the area. On 26 March, the FPN announced it would accept Libyan mediation with the Nigerien government, in order to seek a "lasting peace".

=== Peace talks ===
On 3 April, a Nigerien delegation headed by the Nigerien Minister of the Interior Albadé Abouba arrived in Tripoli to begin joint meetings with the FPN and MNJ at Sirte. In a statement after the meetings, the FPN congratulated "His excellency Tanja Mamadou" for sending "a strong signal in the direction af a return to peace" On 15 April, the Nigerien government released a positive statement, saying that negotiations gave the government a chance to assure the rebels of their desire for peace. Meetings were headed by the Libyan mediators, Albadé Abouba for Niger, Aghali Alambo for the MNJ, Mohamed Aoutchiki Kriska (FFR), and Aklou Sidi Sidi, president of the FPN. The FPN leadership continued to release positive statements, but they, like the Nigerien government, accused the remaining MNJ leadership of dragging their feet over the remaining FAN prisoner, an army officer captured in 2007 and accused by the rebels of war crimes.

=== Civilian opening ===
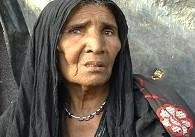
Fatimana Imola, a Tuareg woman in Northern Niger is interviewed by Voice of America journalists. She says army officers killed and dismembered her younger brother, Imola Kalakouawa when they suspected him of planting a mine in June 2007.

In Agadez Region, several events signaled a return to peace. On 28 April the United Nations World Food Programme announced it would begin aiding the repatriation of 20,000 people internally displaced since 2007. The towns of Iférouane, Gougaram, Danet, Dabaga and Tchirozérine would receive food and resettlement centres to ease the transition. Despite this, the government in Niamey announced on 23 May that it had renewed the "state of emergency" in the entire Agadez Region for another three months, allowing preventive detention and banning public gatherings.

=== May meetings ===
On 3 May President Tandja made his first visit to Agadez in over two years. He joined the Areva CEO Anne Lauvergeon and French Minister of Overseas Cooperation Alain Joyandet in placing the first stone in the new Imouraren mine. Imouraren, scheduled to open in 2012, will replace Areva's current Arlit Uranium mine, and as planned will be the largest Uranium mine in the world. Tandja drove through the streets of Agadez, met with local leaders, and for the first time, met with representatives of the rebel groups. The President broadcast as statement saying "We have asked them to put down their weapons and come build the country with us. We forgive them because we want peace in Niger", promising for the first time amnesty for rebels who disarmed. Prior to the meeting, the MNJ released the last FAN prisoner it had held, an Army captain taken in July 2007, whom rebels had previously accused of killing civilians. Rebels and government continued negotiations, now reportedly on the practical process of turning in weapons. While all sides released positive statements, an FFR spokesman warned "The process of turning in weapons will be a rather long one." The MNJ briefly announced it would not agree to any disarmament until several of its political demands had been met, but later backed away from this statement. Four party talks between the Nigerien minister of the Interior and the leadership of the Niger Movement for Justice (MNJ) Front of Forces for Rectification (FFR) and Niger Patriotic Front (FPN) continued through May and into June, hosted by Libya.

=== Disposing of arms ===
On 15 June 2009, the Nigerien government announced a plan for cantonment and disarming agreed in Libya with the coalition of FFR and FPN groups (called the Front of National Liberation or FLN) had begun, with the first of 1200 expected FLN fighters arriving at a cantonment center 45 km outside Agadez. Their announced plan was to gather fighters there, and begin turning in arms within two weeks. In a 4 June 2009 interview, the President of the FPN said that their group had 2403 men under arms. FFR had not announced the number of their forces, and it is unknown what the MNJ force strength was after the FPN splintered from them.

== Al-Qaeda in the Islamic Maghreb ==
The larger Tuareg conflicts were brought under increased international attention following the kidnapping in late 2008 in Niger of two Canadian diplomats and four European tourists by groups associated with Al-Qaeda Organization in the Islamic Maghreb, who held their victims somewhere in northern Mali. Late April 2009 saw the release in northern Mali of the Western hostages taken by the AQIM, including the Canadian diplomat to Niger Robert Fowler. The governments of Niger and Mali, as well as Tuareg rebel groups, had come under unusual international pressure over the taking of these seven hostages under mysterious circumstances, even prior to the acknowledged involvement of the AQIM. The original two abduction incidents (two Canadian diplomats, their driver, and four European tourists seized weeks later) were blamed by Niger on rebels, and by the MNJ on the Niger government. Western news sources quoted a variety of observers who believed the hostages were taken by Tuareg smugglers, perhaps associated with rebel groups, who then sold them to the AQIM. Two of the four European tourists were later released. One of the two remaining, British tourist Edwin Dyer, was killed by his captors in June 2009. In May 2009 Malian President Amadou Toumani Toure agreed, after talks between Mali's defence minister and Algerian President Abdelaziz Bouteflika, to a military cooperative agreement to secure the Saharan borders where Tuareg rebels, AQIM militants, as well as smugglers and criminal gangs, operated. Discussions with the governments of Niger and Mauritania were proposed. Under the agreement, states would receive arms from Algeria and engage in joint operations against AQIM and other threats.

== See also ==
- Tuareg people
- List of wars: 2003–2019
- Azawagh
- Insurgency in the Maghreb (2002–present)
- Operation Enduring Freedom – Trans Sahara
