= Ibrahim Ag Bahanga =

- Born: ~1970; Tin-Essako, Mali
- Died: August 26, 2011 Tamesna Desert, Mali
- Cause of death: Car accident
- Buried: In-Agharous, Tin-Essako Cercle, Mali
- Allegiance: (Libya) Islamic Legion (1980s); MPLA (1990-1991); MPA (1991-1996); Mali (1996-2001); ADC (2006); ATNMC (2007-2011); ATNM (2007-2011)
- Rank: Corporal (Malian Army)
- Known for: Co-founder of the ADC, last rebel of the Tuareg rebellion of 2007 to 2009
- Conflicts: Tuareg rebellion (1990-1996); Tuareg rebellion (2006); Tuareg rebellion (2007-2009): Tinzaouaten attack; Battle of Abeïbara; Battle of Nampala (2008); Battle of Toulousimine

Ibrahim Ag Bahanga was a Tuareg rebel who fought in several Tuareg rebellions between 1990 and 2011. He was one of the founders of the May 23, 2006 Democratic Alliance for Change, and became the sole leader of the Tuareg rebellion in 2009 after the rest of the ADC signed peace agreements.

== Biography ==
Bahanga was born in Tin-Essako, Mali around 1970. He grew up in Tinzaouaten, on the Malian-Algerian border. In the 1980's, Bahanga underwent military training with many other Tuaregs in Libya's Islamic Legion. When he returned to Mali, he participated in the Tuareg rebellion of 1990-1996, fighting in the People's Movement for the Liberation of Azawad (MPLA) which later changed to the Popular Movement of Azawad. Following the end of the war, Bahanga was promoted to corporal in the Malian Army. He deserted immediately afterward.

In December 2001, Bahanga took ten Malian soldiers hostage to have his village of Tin Essako established as a commune. His demands were accepted, but in return Bahanga was barred from the Malian Army. He took part in negotiations between the GSPC and the Malian and Algerian governments following the kidnapping of thirty-two Western tourists in the Algerian desert.

Bahanga participated in the attacks on Malian bases in Kidal and Ménaka on May 23, 2006, alongside Hassan Ag Fagaga, Iyad Ag Ghaly, and Ahmada Ag Bibi. He then co-founded the May 23, 2006 Democratic Alliance for Change (ADC) with Fagaga, Ghaly, and Bibi. The Tuareg rebellion of 2006 was swiftly quelled with the Algiers Accords. Following the rebellion, he then became a member of the High Council for Communities along with Ghaly.

On May 11, 2007, Bahanga took part in the Tinzaouaten attack alongside Nigerien rebels. He was injured in the attack, and transported to Tamanrasset, Algeria for his injuries. He founded the Northern Mali Tuareg Alliance for Change in 2007, and fought against the Malian Army in the Tuareg rebellion of 2007 to 2009. On August 26 and 27, 2007, he captured around forty Malian soldiers. He attacked a Malian outpost in Abeïbara in May 2008, and later attacked the Malian garrison at Nampala. His main base in Tinsalak was destroyed by the Malian Army in 2009, and he was pushed out of Mali at the Battle of Toulousimine.

Bahanga was part of a minority group within the ADC that refused to reintegrate the Algiers Accords in 2009. In response, the Malian Army destroyed Bahanga's bases, and Bahanga sought refuge in Libya in February 2009. After two years of exile in Libya, Bahanga returned to northern Mali in January 2011. He returned with former comrades from the Islamic Legion and veterans of the 1990 rebellion, some of whom were officers in the Libyan Army such as Mohamed Ag Najem.

Bahanga died on August 26, 2011 when his car flipped over in the Tamesna desert near the village of Intadjedite on his way to Libya. His body was buried in In-Agharous, near Tin-Essako.
