= Niger Movement for Justice =

Mouvement des Nigériens pour la justice
- Leaders: Aghali Alambo, President; Amoumoune Kalakouwa, Military Chief MNJ; Capt. Asharif Mohamed-Almoctar, 1st VP MNJ; Bataillon Chief Kindo Zada, 2nd VP MNJ; Ghissa Feltou, Political Coordinator: MNJ Europe
- Dates active: 2007–present
- Groups: Tuareg: Kel Ayr, others
- Headquarters: Aïr Massif, Niger
- Active regions: Northern Niger
- Wars: Tuareg rebellion (2007–2009)

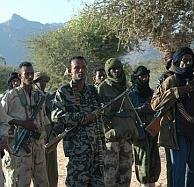
A group of Nigerien rebel fighters in northern Niger, from the Niger Movement for Justice. February 2008.

The Nigerien's Movement for Justice (French: Mouvement des Nigériens pour la justice, MNJ) is a largely ethnic Tuareg militant group based in northern Niger. However the group also includes other nomadic ethnicities within this area, such as the Toubou and the Fulani. These groups have been battling the Niger government since 2007.

The MNJ wants a greater share of the revenues from northern Niger's uranium wealth to be invested in the region. Niger is one of the top five uranium producers in the world. It is also one of the bottom five poorest countries on earth. The MNJ also want a restriction of the area that will be affected by the expansion of the uranium mines, to protect the space they need to raise their animals.

== Events ==
MNJ has claimed a series of attacks on the Nigerien Military and foreign economic interests since February 2007. The organization has taken responsibility for attacks which have killed 45 people and seized several Nigerien soldiers. In 2008, the MNJ claimed to have some 3,500 fighters, many of them defectors from the Nigerien military.

In June 2007, the MNJ attacked northern Niger's main airport at Agadez and overran an army outpost in the Aïr Mountains taking over 70 Nigerien soldiers prisoner.

On 6 July 2007, the MNJ kidnapped a Chinese nuclear engineer working for China Nuclear Engineering and Construction Corps, holding him for about 10 days until releasing him to the Red Cross. The company had been prospecting for uranium for some time in Teguidan Tessoumt in cooperation with the Niger government, and MNJ wanted them to cease their operations.

On 22 June 2008, the MNJ kidnapped four employees of Areva, the French state nuclear corporation which has been exploiting northern Niger's uranium for over forty years. The French nationals were released to the Red Cross three days later.

== Leaders ==
The MNJ is led by Aghaly ag Alambo, a former member of the Front de libération de l'Aïr et de l'Azawagh (FLAA), and Mohamed Acharif, a former captain in the Nigerien Armed Forces who defected to the rebels in May 2007.

Aghaly Alambo, from Iferouane in northern Niger, was apparently inspired by the Mali based Tuareg group May 23, 2006 Democratic Alliance for Change (Mai 23, 2006 Alliance démocratique pour le changement - ADC), ex-combatants who led a short campaign in the north of Mali from May to July 2006, when they signed a peace deal with the Bamako government. In late March 2008, the ADC restarted its armed uprising against the Mali government.

== See also ==
- Tuareg rebellion (2007–2009)
- Azawagh
- Revolutionary Armed Forces of the Sahara (FARS)
- La Mort de la gazelle
