= Kafougouna Koné =

Malian politician, diplomat and military officer

Minister of Territorial Administration and Local Authorities
- In office 16 October 2002 – 22 March 2012

Minister of Defense of Mali
- In office 1991–1992

Personal details
- Born: 1944 Fourou, French Sudan, French West Africa
- Died: 10 March 2017 (aged 73) Bamako, Mali

Kafougouna Koné (1944 – 10 March 2017) was a Malian politician, diplomat and military officer. He served as Minister of Defense from 1991 to 1992 during the country's transition to democracy.

During the Agacher Strip War of December 1985, Koné commanded a Groupement Opérationnels Tactiques during the Malian offensive against Burkina Faso.

Kafougouna Koné was serving as the Chief of Staff of the Army at the time of the 1991 Malian coup d'état which overthrew the dictatorship of President Moussa Traoré. In the aftermath of the coup, Koné was appointed Minister of Defense from 1991 to 1992 during Mali's transition to democracy.

In 1992, Koné was appointed as Mali's ambassador to China. He returned to Mali following the end of his diplomatic posting and was appointed chief electoral office in 2001.

On 16 October 2002 Koné was appointed Minister of Territorial Administration and Local Authorities within the government of Prime Minister Ahmed Mohamed ag Hamani. Koné retained the post of Minister of Territorial Administration and Local Authorities during the successor governments of Prime Ministers Ousmane Issoufi Maïga (2004–2007), Modibo Sidibé (2007–2009, 2009–2011), and Cissé Mariam Kaïdama Sidibé (2011–2012).

Kafougouna Koné died in Bamako on 10 March 2017, at the age of 73. He was buried in Niamakoro cemetery with full military honors. Dignitaries in attendance at his funeral included President Ibrahim Boubacar Keïta and former President Dioncounda Traoré, as well as former prime ministers, military officials, government ministers and traditional rulers of the Bamako region.

== Honors ==
Koné was the recipient of the Cross for Military Valour of Mali and an Officier de l'Ordre national et Commandeur de l'Ordre national du Mali. In 2006, he was elevated to the Grand Officier de l'Ordre national of Mali.
