= May 23, 2006 Democratic Alliance for Change =

Malian rebel group

The May 23, 2006 Democratic Alliance for Change (French: Alliance Démocratique du 23 mai pour le Changement; abbreviated ADC) is a Malian Tuareg rebel group, formed in 2006 by ex-combatants from the 1990s Tuareg insurgency in Mali. In 2007, splinters of the organisation returned to combat in northern Mali, launching the Malian element of the 2007 Tuareg insurgency. Led by Ibrahim Ag Bahanga, this ADC faction continued to operate under that name, despite most elements remaining under ceasefire. In July 2008, most of these elements, along with much of the splinter following Ag Bahanga reached another accord with the Malian government in Algiers. Ag Bahanga and a faction of that group rejected the accord and fled to Libya. At the end of 2008, this faction returned to fighting, operating under the name Alliance Touaregue Nord Mali Pour Le Changement (ATNMC). The government of Mali has contended since 2007 that the Ag Bahanga faction of the ADC is a "band of marginals" who were "isolated from the heart of the Tuareg community", primarily motivated by lucrative Trans-Saharan smuggling operations operating from Ag Bahanga's home town of Tin-Zaouatene. Ag Bahanga and the other leaders of his faction contend that the government of Mali oppresses the Tuareg population of the north, and has repeatedly failed to live up to its agreements with the ADC and other groups. Outside observers have also speculated that internal rivalries between Tuareg from the Kel Adagh (around Kidal) and the Ouilliminden confederations have frustrated peace attempts.

== May–June 2006 rising ==
On 23 May 2006, it launched attacks on the towns of Ménaka and Kidal in northeastern Mali, claiming that the agreements ending the previous conflict in 1995 had not been met by the government of Mali. Its leadership was drawn from the then defunct Mouvement Populaire de l'Azawad which was formally disbanded in 1996. The Secretary General was former MPA founder Iyad Ag Ghali, although operations were directed by Ibrahim Ag Bahanga, who himself had fought with the MPA. The group was based in the Adrar des Ifoghas mountains, and launched attacks near the city of Kidal and south into the Gao Region.

In July 2006, the ADC signed a peace agreement with the Malian government much along the lines of the previous agreement. Negotiated with the help of the Algerian government, the "Algiers Accord" stipulated fighters would be integrated into the Malian army, that Tuareg units would patrol Tuareg areas in the north, and that greater development projects would be pursued in the Tuareg majority Kidal Region.

== In 2007 Tuareg insurgency ==
In August 2007 the group reappeared under the military command of a former rebel who had been integrated into the Malian Armed Forces in 1996 and 2006, Lt. Col. Hassan Ag Fagaga. Ibrahim Ag Bahanga was the overall commander of this new ADC faction, while former MPA rebel (and Ag Bahanga's father in law) Hama Ag Sidahmed was spokesperson. In October of that year the group claimed to have 165 men under arms. The group used the ADC name, but former leaders Iyad Ag Ghali and Ahmada Ag Bibi denounced its attacks, and only some elements of the former ADC participated in attacks. The Ag Bahanga led rebels announced on August 31 that they would negotiate with the government, and intermediaries from former Tuareg rebels headed by Iyad Ag Ghaly, as well as Libyan leader Muammar al-Gaddafi, offered to mediate. At the same time, Hama Ag Sidahmed, speaking for the same group announced the creation of a Niger-Mali Tuareg alliance (the Alliance-Touareg-Niger-Mali pour le Changement, ATNMC), though this was denied by another group, claiming to represent the ADC. Perhaps as importantly, the Nigerien rebels of the MNJ denied any confederation.

The Malian government claimed that Ag Bahanga been given an officers commission in a Tuareg unit of the Malian army after the 2006 rising, but had deserted early in the summer of 2007, and claimed that his rebel forces are involved in organized crime and drug smuggling. Public and government in Mali appeared shocked by the level of violence in the north of Kidal, Ménaka and the Sahel region, as well as by the effectiveness of the rebel force, and nationalist feeling ran high against the Ag Bahanga in particular among much of the Malian press and public.

From 9 to 18 September 2007, Ag Bahanga's forces besieged the northern town of Tin-Zaouatene, withdrawing after reinforcements arrived. As fighting subsided between late 2007 an early 2008, the Ag Bahanga faction of the ADC ceased to issue communiques under the ADC name, and in May 2008 began to release them under the name Alliance Touareg Nord Mali pour le Changement (ATNMC), notably dropping the "Niger" from the previous name, but keeping the acronym.

=== 2007 negotiations ===
Iyad Ag Ghaly, acting as a mediator for the Malian government began peace negotiations with the ADC factions, assuring that those on cease fire remained so, and attempting to bring Ag Bahanga to a deal. Negotiations first took place with the help of the Libyan government, but also with Algeria, a regional rival of the Libyans, and home to a substantial Tuareg population. In March, Muammar Gaddafi of Libya negotiated the release of Malian army prisoners held by the rebels, and sporadic talks were held with Libyan mediation. Malian armed forces remained in control of all the major settlements, but Malian rebels staged a series of raids, the largest taking place at the end of March. Rebel forces attacked a convoy near Abeibara in the east, killing 7 and capturing 20 soldiers and four military vehicles. A 4 April ceasefire and prisoner exchange was negotiated again through Libya, but each side accused the others of failing to end hostilities, and more sporadic attacks on Army positions occurred in May.

In early June, rebels killed 25 soldiers in an attack on a Kidal base, and in late June the Malian Army killed 20 rebels near the Algerian border, which the Army said was a major rebel base. But just days later, President Amadou Toumani Toure said he remained open to negotiations with the Tuareg rebels, while at the same time agreeing joint security with Algeria.

At Tessalit on 18 July rebels overran a military post, taking 20 prisoners as well as supplies. Two days later a peace deal was announced, revealing that Algeria had been hosting talks between the government of Mali and the leadership of the "Alliance démocratique du 23 mai".

The Algerian ambassador to Mali, Abdelkrim Ghrieb, had negotiated the deal, between Amada Ag Bibi (now a Deputy in the Malian National Assembly) for the rebels and General Kafougouna Koné, Malian Minister of the Interior, for the Malian government. 92 prisoners held by the rebels would be released, amnesties were promised for rebels, and re-integration into the military (along the lines of the 2006 deal) were promised for Tuareg fighters. This agreement held throughout 2008, and by the end of the year the Malian conflict was seen as resolved.

This was also a success for Algeria as a regional power, and rival of the Libyan government for influence in the Sahara. Throughout the process, the Malian government, as well as Tuareg leaders on both sides of the conflict public ally pushed for a negotiated settlement, in contrast with the Nigerien conflict. Cherif Ouazani was quoted in Algeria as describing the talks as "Malians talking to Malians" While the last of the rebel held prisoners were released in August, and the ceasefire held as of the end of that month, there continued to be speculation on the role played by presumed Mai 23 leader Ibrahim Ag Bahanga, who has not participated in the Algerian sponsored tripartite talks. Press speculation has posed a split in the already fractured movement, in which Touareg groups loyal to the Kel Adagh fully participated in the eventual peace process, which seemed to have resolved the conflict since August 2008. Meanwhile, a smaller group around Ag Bahanga had been holding out for Libyan sponsored mediation, and eventually abandoned the talks and sought refuge in Libya.

=== Mali December 2008: Ag Bahanga's return ===
Sometime before the beginning of December 2008, Ibrahim Ag Bahanga returned from his self-imposed exile in Libya: he and the Alliance Touaregue Nord Mali Pour Le Changement (ATNMC) faction took credit in communiques for a series of attacks in northern Mali beginning on 18 December. They attacked a desert garrison post at Nampala 500 km north of Bamako near the Mauritanian border. Between 11 and 20 Malian Armed Forces soldiers were killed and an unknown number of rebels. This made it the bloodiest fighting since June 2007. The attack was prefaced by the killing of an aide to a pro-government Tuareg leader in Gao on the 18th, in a grenade attack on the politician's home.

The ATNMC released communiques claiming their patrols had, on 24 and 25 December destroyed two Army vehicles far south into the populated regions of Mali, on the Kati–Diéma–Nioro road and the Ségou to Tombouctou road. There was no government confirmation of these attacks.

Regardless, the attack on Nampala pushed the fighting far to the south. The President of Mali, Amadou Toumani Toure vowed harsh action in a speech at Kayes: "Enough is enough. We cannot continue to suffer, we cannot keep counting our dead... We cannot keep searching for peace... They are firing on anything that moves. They are firing on soldiers, they're firing on civilians, what does all this mean?" He claimed that while Nampala had no strategic importance, it was "close to the different routes and paths that take drugs across the Sahara-Sahel strip". This was a reiteration of the government contention that elements of the rebels were motivated not by political motives, but were involved in the lucrative Saharan smuggling trade, and that the rebel's desire to have the town of Tin-Zaouatene evacuated of troops was cover for their smuggling operations.

=== The ADC and the ATNMC ===
The Malian army quickly responded with an attack on a rebel camp just west of Aguelhoc (In the Adrar des Ifoghas, Kidal Region) in which it said it killed 20 fighters and took 8 prisoners. Malian press reports claimed that the Malian forces were led by Arab militias recruited by the government. One editorial in Le Republican (Bamako) argued that this, along with the growing resurgence of former Ghanda Koy militia activities in Gao risked adding a greater ethnic dimension to the conflict.

On 22 January, the Malian armed forces claimed to have destroyed Ag Bahanga's main base at Tinsalak (in the Tigharghar hills to the east of Tessalit), killing 31 and capturing 8. The attack, unlike the previous assault, was reported to have been carried out by regular units of the armed forces. In mid December, Ag Bahanga gave an interview to the Algerian El-Watan newspaper claiming that war was now his only option in dealing with the government. On 24 January though May 23, ADC Group rebels released the last three Malian military hostages they were holding in the Kidal area. In this same period, a group of foreign tourists were seized in southeastern Mali by unknown captors. Ag Bahanga denied any involvement. In a previous interview with the Algerian media, Ag Bahanga claimed Islamist GSPC militants were active "north of Timbuktu" (to the west of his area of operation), and that his forces were "in a state of war" with the GSPC. Some Malian sources initially blamed the kidnapping on Ag Bahanga's forces.

January 2009 also appeared to also have marked the final break between Ag Bahanga's faction and the remainder of the ADC. According to the 2006 and 2008 Algiers Accords, the ADC elements on cease fire were headquartered in Kidal, both the political leadership, and the former fighters integrated in their own units of the Malian Armed forces. In mid January, the former Ag Bahanga faction military commander, Lt. Col. Hassane Fagaga, returned to ceasefire and cantonment near Kidal. According to the Malian military, Fagaga came into cantonment with 400 ADC fighters. On 26 January, Fagaga and the remained of the cease-fire ADC announced that they would transfer their headquarters and bases south of Kidal. On 5 February, the Malian Armed forces concluded negotiations for 180 of the ADC fighters, all former Malian Armed Forces deserters, to re-enter the cantonment area at Camp Kidal. These fighters maintained control of their arms. The government, rebels and Algerian interlocutors held off on a final agreement that would bring the remaining 220 or more rebels into cantonment. The tripartite Groupe Technique de Sécurité, set up under the 2008 accord, would negotiate the movement of rebel forces into disarmament, possible reintegration into security services, and final cantonment at a base near Agharous, 50 km south of Kidal.

If all these ADC forces remain on ceasefire, it is unclear how many fighters remain with Ag Bahanga and his ATNMC faction, especially as the faction itself claimed in late 2007 to have no more than 165 men under arms. On 6 February, the Malian Armed Forces claimed they had taken the last of the ATNMC positions, while Ag Bahanga and an unknown number of fighters had crossed the border into Algeria.
