= Abeïbara =

Commune and village in Mali

- Commune and village
- Location in Mali
- Coordinates: 19°21′00″N 1°50′42″E
- Country: Mali
- Region: Kidal Region
- Cercle: Abeïbara Cercle

Area
  - Total: 8,320 km^{2} (3,210 sq mi)

Population (2009 census)
  - Total: 4,585
  - Density: 0.551/km^{2} (1.43/sq mi)
- Time zone: UTC+1 (WAT)

Abeïbara is a small Saharan village and rural commune in the Abeïbara Cercle of the Kidal Region of north-eastern Mali. The commune has an area of approximately 8,320 square kilometers and contains 11 settlements. In the 2009 census it had a population of 4,585.

== Notable people ==
Famous people include Iyad Ag Ghaly, a Tuareg militant.
