= Assamakka =

- Location in Niger
- Coordinates: 19°20′4″N 5°46′19″E
- Country: Niger
- Region: Agadez Region
- Department: Tchirozerine
- Elevation: 451 m (1,480 ft)

Population (2001)
  - Total: 365
- Time zone: UTC+1 (West Africa Time)
  - Summer (DST): UTC+1 (West Africa Time)

Assamakka is a small desert town in northern Niger at the main border crossing with Algeria. It is the only official crossing point between the two nations. Assamakka shares the border with the larger town of In Guezzam 10 km on the Algerian side. A main road extends north in Algeria to Tamanrasset, 400 km away. Assamakka is connected to the town of Arlit, 200 km to the south by a road which remains in largely a sand "Piste". From Arlit, the "Uranium Highway", a tarred road built in the 1970s for mining trucks, travels south to Agadez and Niamey.

== Border regulation ==
While the military on either side of the border have frequently closed this border post to traffic due to Tuareg insurgencies of the 1990s and 2000s, the border area in this region has no effective controls or even marking. Easily transported border wall material is stored near the border crossing on the Niger side, ready to deploy.

== Geography ==
The area around Assamakka is flat and absolutely desert: the rocky plains of the Toussasset region begin just to the east, and are punctuated by Ergs, or "dune seas". To the south the Azawagh region is characterised by dry plains and ancient dry river valleys arcing to the southwest from the Aïr Mountains.

Assamakka has a hot desert climate (Köppen climate classification BWh) with extreme heat and a great lack of rainfall. From late April to late October, the mercury rises almost every day above 40 °C in the shade; in June, the average high temperature even exceeds 45 °C in the shade. All year long, days are very hot and sunny. The cloud cover and precipitation are absent except during the short irregular "rainy" season in July and August, then the weather clears up again.

== Population ==
The town itself has long been a Tuareg encampment at a strategic desert well. What small population which is found here are nomadic or semi nomadic Tuareg, many of whom engage in cross border trade with Tuareg communities to the north and south, or pass through this area around the brief rainy season of the Azawagh plains to the far southwest.

The area is dominated by Tuareg tribal populations, as well as nomadic minorities, including Hassaniyya-speaking Moors (also called Azawagh Arabs, not to be confused with Niger's Diffa Arabs) in the northwest border regions of Niger. The Azawagh area is the centre for the Iwellemeden Kel Denneg federation.

The town itself has grown as a transit point for migrants from sub-Saharan Africa to the Maghreb. Trucks from the south drop off migrants here, who must then arrange trips over the border. Consequently, the small population is ethnically diverse and fluctuates. Illegal migrants deported south from Algeria are also returned here, sometimes in large numbers.

== Tuareg insurgency ==
Several disputed killings of rebels and civilians are alleged to have taken place in the Assamakka area during the 2007 Tuareg Insurgency against the Nigerian government.
