= Ayinke Saka =

Nigerian medical doctor, public administrator, and social development advocate

Commissioner for Women Affairs and Social Development, Kwara State

Personal details
- Citizenship: Nigerian
- Occupation: Medical doctor, public servant, politician
- Known for: Women affairs advocacy, healthcare initiatives, gender-based violence awareness

Ayinke Saka is a Nigerian medical doctor, public administrator, and social development advocate. She served as the Commissioner for Women Affairs and Social Development in Kwara State, in Nigeria, where she was involved in gender-focused policy implementation, healthcare outreach programmes, and social welfare initiatives.

== Career ==
=== Commissioner for Women Affairs and Social Development ===
Ayinke Saka served as Commissioner for Women Affairs and Social Development in Kwara State, where she was responsible for policies and programmes aimed at improving the welfare of women, children, and vulnerable groups.

She publicly raised concerns over increasing cases of sexual and gender-based violence, particularly rape cases in Kwara State, describing the situation as alarming and calling for stronger preventive and enforcement measures.

=== Health and social development initiatives ===
During her tenure, she supported and participated in health outreach programmes focused on improving access to healthcare services for women, including free cancer screening initiatives for early detection of breast and cervical cancer.

These initiatives were implemented in collaboration with government agencies and non-governmental organisations to improve healthcare awareness and early diagnosis among women in Kwara State.

=== Public service and governance ===
Ayinke was also involved in broader social intervention programmes and government led welfare initiatives in Kwara State, particularly those targeting vulnerable populations and community development.

Her work has been referenced in media reports relating to governance, development, and social policy implementation in Ilorin and across Kwara State.

== Public advocacy ==
Ayinke Saka is known for her advocacy on women's rights, healthcare awareness, and social welfare issues. Her engagements have focused on addressing gender based violence and improving access to healthcare services for women and vulnerable groups in society.

== Public image ==
She is regarded as a public service figure in Kwara State whose work has been highlighted in local media in relation to women affairs, healthcare outreach, and social development programmes.

Her public image is largely associated with gender-focused policy advocacy and community health interventions.

== See also ==
- Kwara State Government
- Women in Nigerian politics
- Gender-based violence in Nigeria
- Healthcare in Nigeria
