= Azawagh =

Dry basin that once carried a northern tributary of the Niger River

Coordinates: 18°18′N 5°18′E

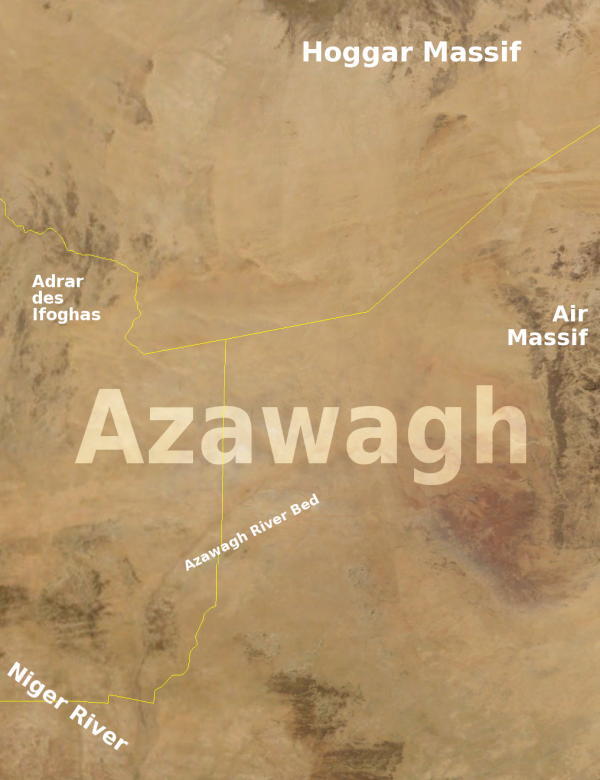
The Azawagh Basin and surrounding geographical features, as seen from space. The yellow lines indicate international borders

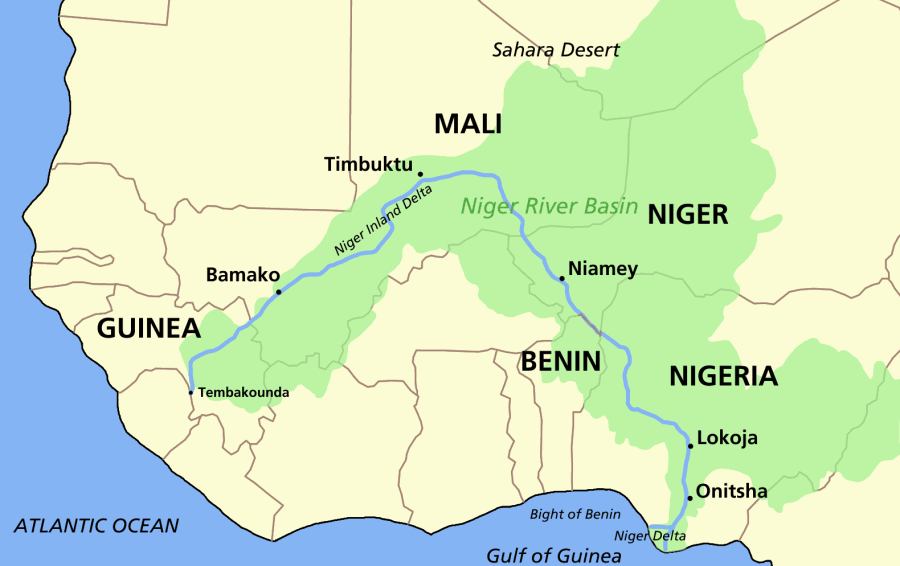
The Azawagh forms the northeastern sections of the Niger River Basin, although today the Azawagh River is long dry, and the area is fed by seasonal underground rivers at best

The Azawagh (alias Azaouagh or Azawak) is a dry basin covering what is today the northwestern Niger, as well as parts of northeastern Mali and southern Algeria. The Azawagh is mainly made up of Sahelian and Saharan flatlands and has a population that is predominantly Tuareg, with some Arabic-speaking and Wodaabe minorities and a recent influx of Hausa and Zarma.

== Name ==
The Tuareg word azawaɣ means "savannah". Azawad, a term used for the portion of northern Mali claimed by the Tuareg rebel movement National Movement for the Liberation of Azawad, is believed to be an Arabic corruption of "Azawagh".

== Geography ==
The Azawagh refers to the dry structural basin, which once carried a northern tributary of the Niger River, the Azawagh river, known as Dallol Bosso further south. The river, which ran some 1,600 kilometres (990 mi) in prehistoric times, dried up after the Neolithic Subpluvial and created a basin of some 420,000 square kilometres (160,000 mi^{2}). Its valley, which geologists call the Iullemmeden Basin, is bordered by the Hoggar Mountains and their foothills in the north, the Aïr Mountains in the east, and the Adrar des Ifoghas in the west. The bedrock of the region is Cretaceous/Paleocene limestone and clay, which was cut by erosion and covered by aeolian sand in the Upper Pleistocene.

In ecological terms, the Azawagh basin is divided into, from north to south, a Saharian, a Sahelian and a northern Sudanese (referring to the geographic region) zone.

In Niger, Azawagh generally includes the towns of Abalagh (Abalak), In Tibaraden (Tchin-Tabaraden), Tiliya, In Gal and Tabalaq, a village where the sole lake of the region is located.

== History ==
Human occupation of the Azawagh has been dated back to 4500 BCE, with evidence of cattle-raising beginning 3200 BCE. From this period until roughly 1500 BCE, the region also supported large fauna, including waterbuck, hippopotami, and elephants.

Evidence of copper-working has been found at Tekebrine dating to 1600 BCE. At around this time, climatic conditions worsened, and the Sudanese peoples of the region were replaced by Berbers who constructed tumuli.

Islam reached the Western Aïr Mountains via southwest Libya in the eighth century. The region was invaded and colonized by the French in the early twentieth century. Following the independence movements of Algeria, Mali, and the Niger, and the corresponding departure of the French, the region became divided between these three nations.

During the 1970s and 1980s, a series of droughts forced increasing numbers of the region's nomadic population into villages and towns. The droughts also sparked a rebellion by the region's Tuareg population, with groups such as Front for the Liberation of Aïr and Azaouak and the Front for the Liberation of Tamoust rebelling against the Nigerien government, while the Arab Islamic Front of Azawad, Popular Movement for the Liberation of Azawad, Revolutionary Liberation Army of Azawad, and the Popular Liberation Front of Azawad opposed the government of Mali.

== Population ==
Despite being the size of Austria, the Nigerien portion of the Azawagh had a population of only 85,000 as of 2003.

The area is dominated by the Kel Tamashek peoples, as well as some nomadic Arab-ancestry tribes including Hassaniyya-speakers (also called Azawagh Arabs, not to be confused with Niger's Diffa Arabs). The Azawagh is the center for the Iwellemeden Kel Denneg Federation.

The region also has a nomadic population of Wodaabe Fulani and a substantial minority of Bouzou, formerly a Tuareg slave caste. In recent years, a number of Hausa and Zarma have settled in the region, primarily as government officials and traders.

== See also ==
- Niger Basin Authority
- Sahara pump theory
- Neolithic Subpluvial
- Prehistoric Central North Africa
- Azawagh Arabs
