= Abdou Tchousso =

Nigerien politician

Minister of Justice of Niger
- In office 27 March 1992 – 22 April 1993

Personal details
- Occupation: Magistrate, Politician

Abdou Tchousso is a Nigerien magistrate and politician who served as Minister of Justice (Keeper of the Seals) in the transition government as part of the First Transition of the Third Republic, from 27 March 1992 to 22 April 1993.

== Career ==
Before his term as minister, Tchousso served as a magistrate, rising through Niger’s judicial ranks. His appointment as Justice Minister occurred during a transitional period after the long-standing Second Republic, and he oversaw aspects of the justice system during a pivotal moment in the country's political evolution.

== Judicial proceedings ==
In a notable 2006 Supreme Court decision, Tchousso was named in a judicial ruling (No. 06‑222) involving allegations of forgery of public documents and fraud. The Chamber ordered a formal investigation and granted him provisional release, indicating the court’s exercise of jurisdiction over judicial misconduct matters involving magistrates.
