= Food insecurity in Niger =

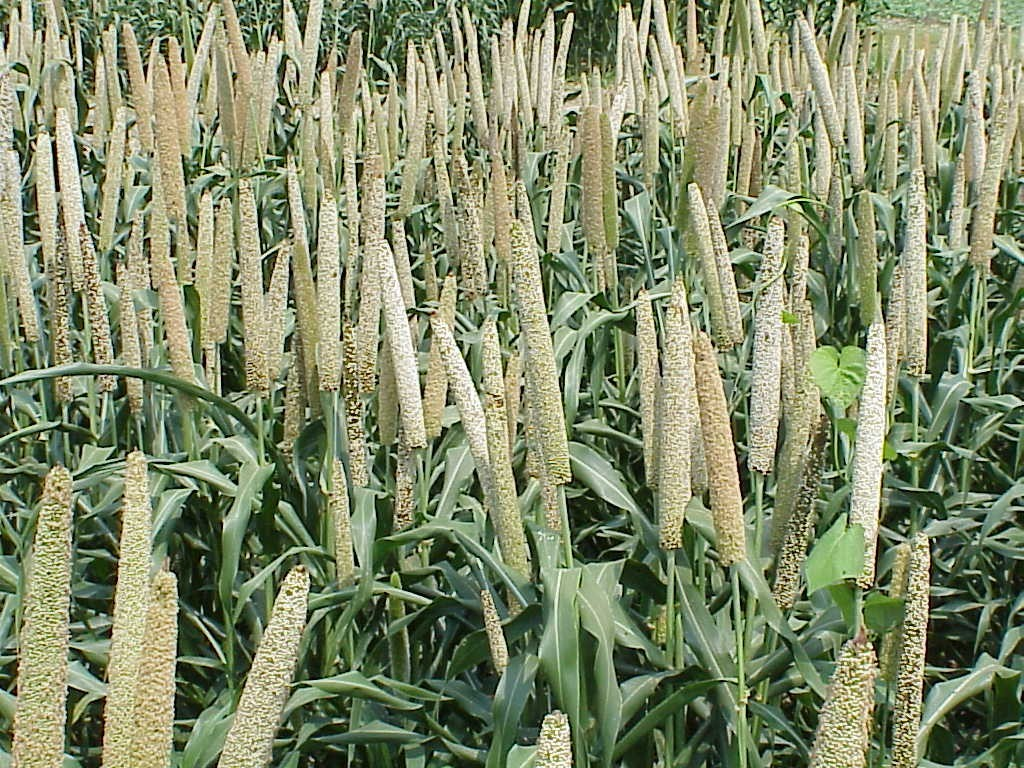
Millet agriculture

Food insecurity in Niger is a growing concern, with more than 1.5 million people affected in the year 2017.

== Contributing factors ==
Some of the largest contributing factors to the low level of food security throughout Niger include high priced essential food, susceptible crops, drought and soil infertility. The United Nations estimates that 3.4 million Nigeriens are suffering from food insecurity with around half the population of children under the age of five being classified as chronically malnourished. Large contributing factors to this problem are inadequate agricultural production and the limited financial resources that the government of Niger has. Areas of the country such as Zinder, Maradi, Tillabéri, Tahoua, and Dosso are categorized as "high risk" livelihood zones; these regions all have experienced unpredictable rain and less access to food. These are also some of the areas where food insecurity is the most prevalent due to the vulnerable state of the agro-pastoral regions.

In 2017 Niger received a 29 on the Global Food Security Index; placing them in 110 out 113 countries. Despite foreign intervention, poor households in Niger are desperate to maintain their current food consumption levels; resorting to migration, borrowing and sale of livestock. This presents additional problems for these families; current exchange rates discourage selling of livestock from Niger to Nigeria which represents the main target market.

In addition to unfavorable markets, Niger is susceptible to food shortages due to climate changes. During seasons of poor rainfall, it is estimated that nearly 30 percent of the population are unable to meet their food needs. In 2012 it was estimated that a population of around 1.3 million people were in need of immediate assistance due to food insecurity as a direct result of unpredictable rain and sub-par agricultural yield. The UN has identified 1.4 million people in need of food and 1.7 million people who need nutrition support countrywide. Poor rainfall has also affected the amount of land dedicated to grow staple agriculture such as millet; which have decline from 25 percent to 12 percent of the country since the 1960s. Niger struggles to produce and supply food during unfavorable climate conditions which contributes to the population in Niger who suffer from food insecurity. In addition to dwindling land resources, food prices are also rising rapidly; the price of staple grains doubled in 2011, leaving many families in Niger unable to afford them. It is predicted that by the beginning of 2019 many susceptible populations throughout the Diffa region will experience Stressed and Crisis levels of food insecurity based on the criteria outlined in the IPC. Some of the food that Nigeriens do have access to is of lower quality. With diets poor in necessary nutrients, illnesses and diseases become more prevalent. Around 73 percent of children under five, as well as, 46 percent of women who are of childbearing age are anemic due to diets low in vitamins and essential minerals.

According to the Demographic and Health Survey the leading causes of child mortality rates are malaria at 27 percent, cough and cold at 19 percent, pneumonia at 11 percent and diarrhea at 10 percent. There is an inversely proportional correlated trend of food intake with diseases such as malaria, hepatitis, cholera and measles due to weakened immune systems associated with inadequate food intake. Another notable factor is the actual composition of Niger population. A substantial amount of the entire population is under the age of 15. Niger's high fertility rates are a result of unbridled population growth, which increases the difficulty of developing the country.

== Security threats ==
The inconsistent rainfall and low access to quality meals that has affected Niger within recent years is not the only contributing factor to the rate of food insecurity. Political conflict and border security also pose a significant threat to food security. Violence such as the Boko Haram crisis, displaced thousands of Nigeriens near the Lake Chad Basin while at the same time Niger is exposed to an influx of refugees from Mali and Nigeria. Resulting in a larger population competing for dwindling resources such as food and arable land. The World Food Programme estimates that in 2017 half the population in the Diffa region is in need of humanitarian assistance with about 308,000 people who are considered food insecure. Political conflicts and violence in Northern Nigeria has also made its way into Niger; adding to the food insecurity problems as well as endangering local communities. These conflicts disrupted activities essential for livelihood, agriculture and trade throughout southern regions in Niger.

In areas where violence is especially prevalent such as the northern area of Nigeria there are a few reports of humanitarian aid workers being executed. These incidents can often complicate future aid programs for these target areas. As a result of the violence, more than half a million children near and throughout the Lake Chad Basin area suffer from food insecurity and are considered malnourished. Households in the Tillaberi and Diffa regions typically have lower access to food compared to the rest of the country.

== Humanitarian assistance ==
With the support of various foreign institutions such as the World Bank, there are plans addressing the growing concern, including a $20 monthly payment plan to women in high risk homes that will allow them to buy more food and improve their food security. These interventions are more long term; as very short-term solutions do not appear to solve any problems beyond the length of time that they are implemented. The World Bank is not alone in their attempts to alleviate food insecurity in Niger; there is also the work being done by the World Food Programme.

One of the strategies pursued by the World Food Programme is community-based asset aid. This encourages the production of land rehabilitation, specifically in regions that are extremely sensitive to climate conditions. Members of the Mercy Corps organization were deployed at places prone to food insecurity in Niger in order to monitor food levels and malnutrition to reduce response time in the event of an emergency. The USAID's Food for Peace office has contributed roughly $203.7 million between 2016 through 2018. Other tactics being deployed in Niger involve the creation of short-term jobs, maintaining the health of local livestock and working with the general population to build more climate resistant communities.

The UN 2018 Humanitarian Response Plan for Niger calls for $338 million; with a majority of that money targeted towards helping to provide food security and nutrition assistance across the country. To reduce the levels of malnourishment observed, children considered malnourished are often treated with iron, folic acid and vitamin A systematically. The World Food Programme states that in 2015 humanitarian assistance provided 200,000 children with school meals across 1,250 schools.

== See also ==
- Poverty in Niger
