= Women in Niger =

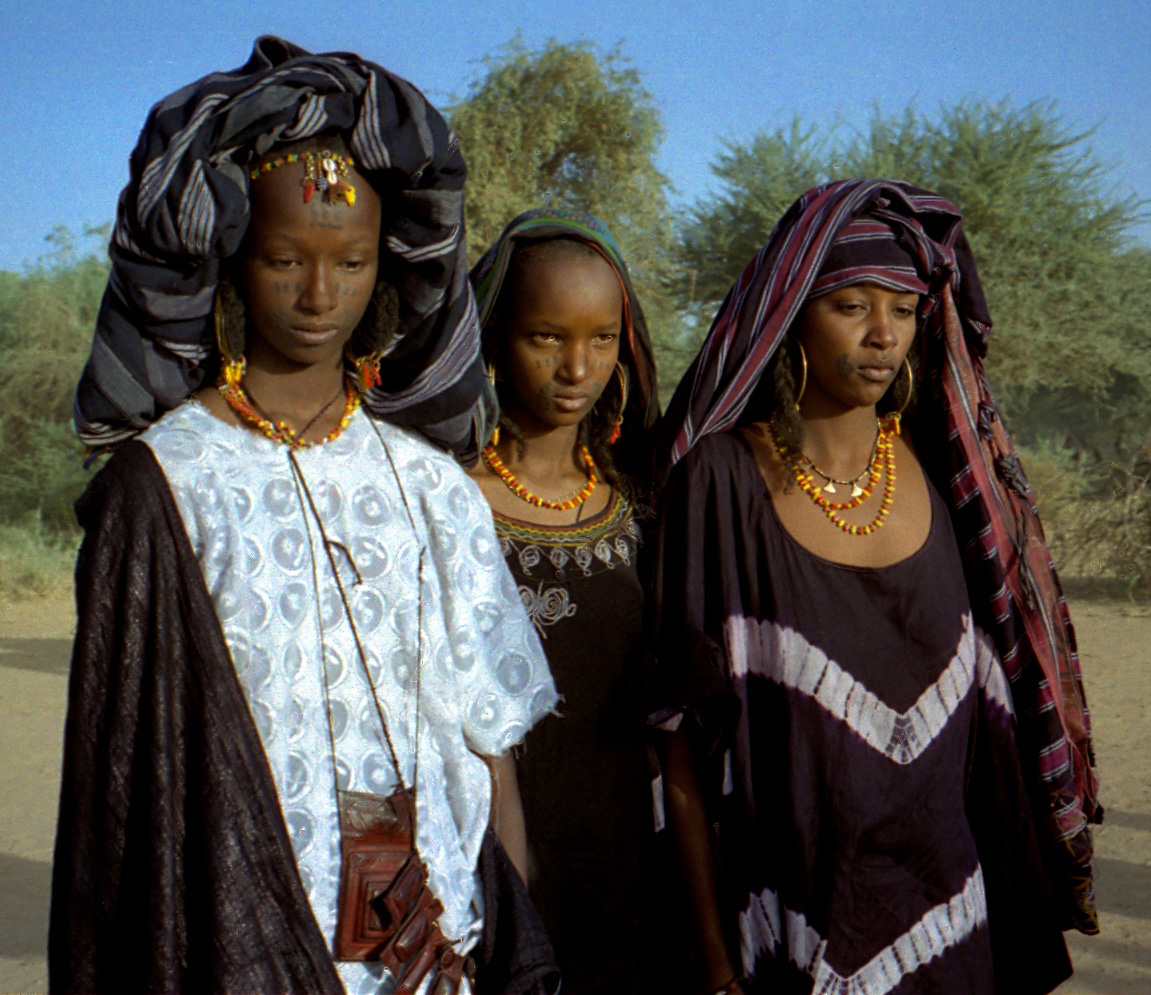
- Three young Wodaabe women in Niger photographed in 1920.

General statistics
- Maternal mortality (per 100,000): 590 (2010)
- Women in parliament: 15% (2017)
- Women over 25 with secondary education: 2.5% (2012)
- Women in labour force: 69% (2017)

Gender Inequality Index
- Value: 0.611 (2021)
- Rank: 153rd out of 191

Global Gender Gap Index
- Value: 0.635 (2022)
- Rank: 128th out of 146

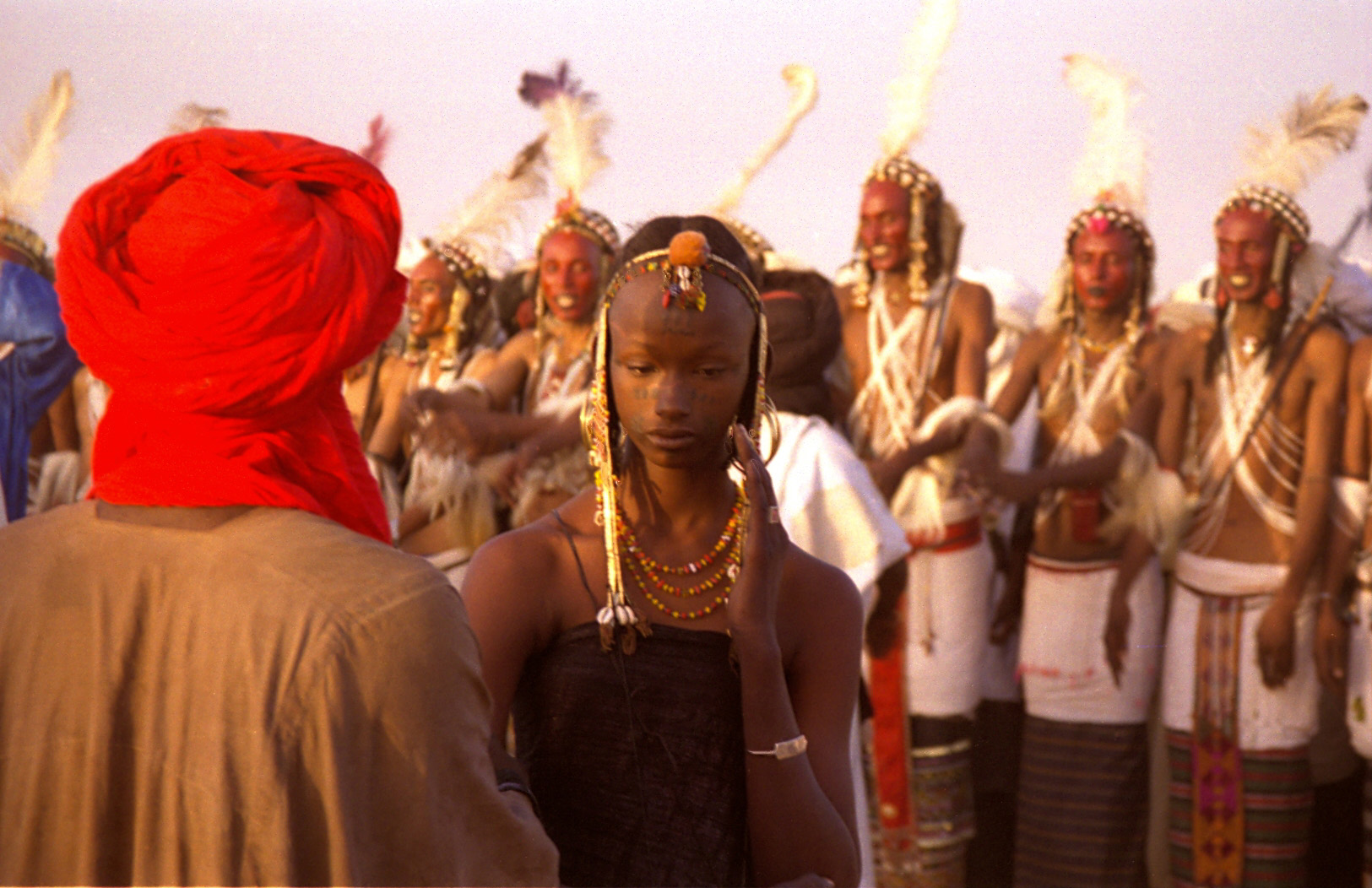
A young Fulani Wodaabe maiden judges male contestants in a Gerewol festival, a competitive courtship ritual that takes place annually in Wodaabe communities in Niger.

Women in Niger are women that are from or live in the West African country of Niger. These women belong to a population in which 98% are practitioners of Islam. Laws adopted by the government of Niger to protect the rights of Nigerien women are most often based on Muslim beliefs.

Nigerien women, not to be confused with Nigerian women, fall into a variety of ethnic groups. Among the largest ethnic groups are the Hausa women, the Fulani women, the Zarma–Songhai women, and the Tuareg women. Hausa women of Niger can be identified by their dressing codes in which they wear wrappers called abaya made from colorful cloth with a matching blouse, head tie and shawl.

Traditional practices are still common in Niger. Family life for young women can be a definite challenge in the primarily Islamic nation. Some of these practices have detrimental effects on the country's well-being, such as the continuation of poverty and illiteracy.

A public holiday in Niger known as the National Day of Nigerien Women (Journée nationale de la femme nigérienne), held annually on 13 May, commemorates a 1992 march by women in Niamey during the National Conference period demanding greater involvement of women in national institutions. It is a holiday that became a "National Commemoration" on 25 November 1992.

== Cultural background ==
Niger is a country in West Africa. It became independent from France in 1960, and was ruled by a single-party and military rule until 1991. Most of the country has a hot, dry, desert climate. It has almost 20 million inhabitants. The ethnic groups are: Hausa 53.1%, Zarma/Songhai 21.2%, Tuareg 11%, Fulani (Peul) 6.5%, Kanuri 5.9%, Gurma 0.8%, Arab 0.4%, Tubu 0.4%, other/unavailable 0.9%. It is mostly a rural society, and almost all the population practices Islam.

== Fertility and family life ==
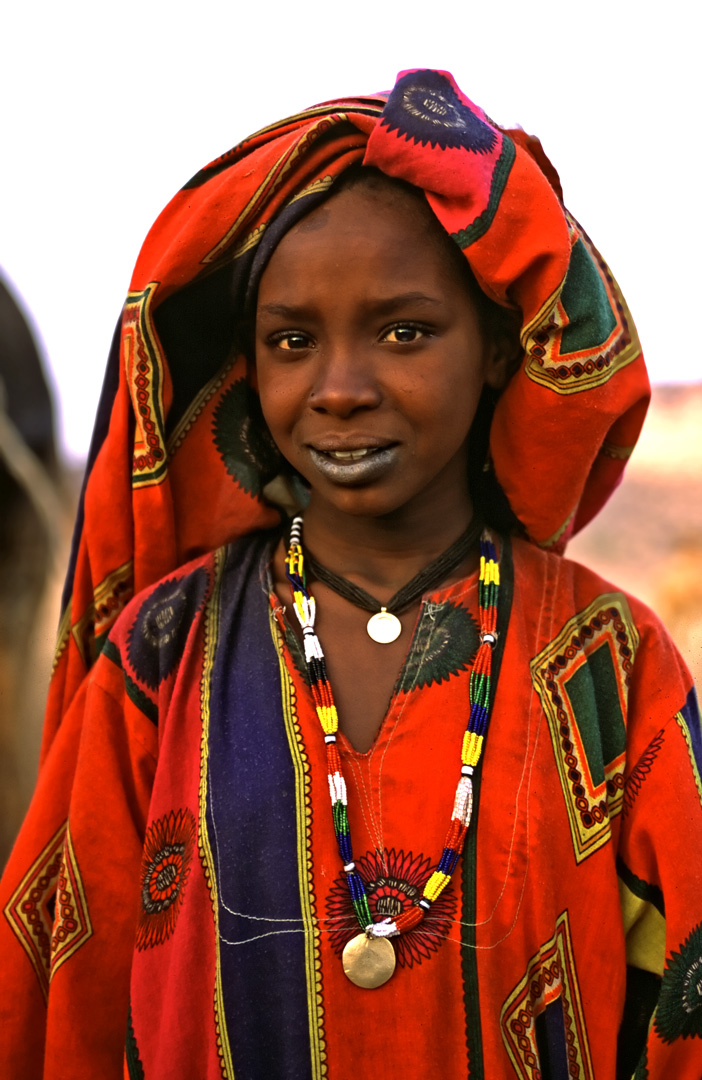
Niger has the highest total fertility rate in the world.

Motherhood in Niger has many complications. Due to economic factors, healthcare inadequacy, and traditional practices, women are at a crucial disadvantage by the time they have their first child.

Child marriage is a common practice in Niger. Around 75% of Nigerien girls are married by their 18th birthday. Although sometimes with the complicity of their family, young girls are often sold into child marriages or sex work. The practice of wahaya allows for slave traders to exploit girls as young as 9, selling them either as domestic servants or commercial sex workers. Human trafficking is common in Niger, as it is a source, point of transit, and a final destination for victims of trafficking both within and outside the country's borders. Young women, sold into their unions, are then at the will of the master in the traditional master-slave cycle that wahaya fuels.

Niger has the highest total fertility rate in the world (almost 7 children/woman), coupled with an extremely high adolescent birth rate. The national median age at first child for women in Niger is 18.1 years old, falling second only to neighboring Chad.

With child marriage, high adolescent birth rates, and a high fertility rate comes high maternal mortality. With a maternal mortality ratio of 555 per 100,000 births, Nigerien mothers must overcome preexisting complications to ensure both lives come out successfully. A lack of quality medical care, adequate health care professionals, and economic well-being all contribute to Niger's very high maternal mortality ratio. Young women are also at a higher risk for complications during child birth. The vast majority of women who give birth at a young age and endure complications during child birth are married women.

== Child brides ==
Child marriage is a common practice in Niger, among the countries with the highest child marriage rates in the world. Around 75% of Nigerien girls are married by their 18th birthday, and 28% are married before their 15th birthday. Although child marriage is common throughout all of Niger, it is particularly common in south Niger. In Niger, a marriage is legally binding when a girl, the bride, is of 15 years of age or older, and a boy, the groom, is of 18 years of age or older. However, this law is not always followed. Many marriages are off the record, without the presence of a Nigerien civil authority and proper documentation. Some girls as young as 9 years old are married, sometimes without the consent of the girl being married.

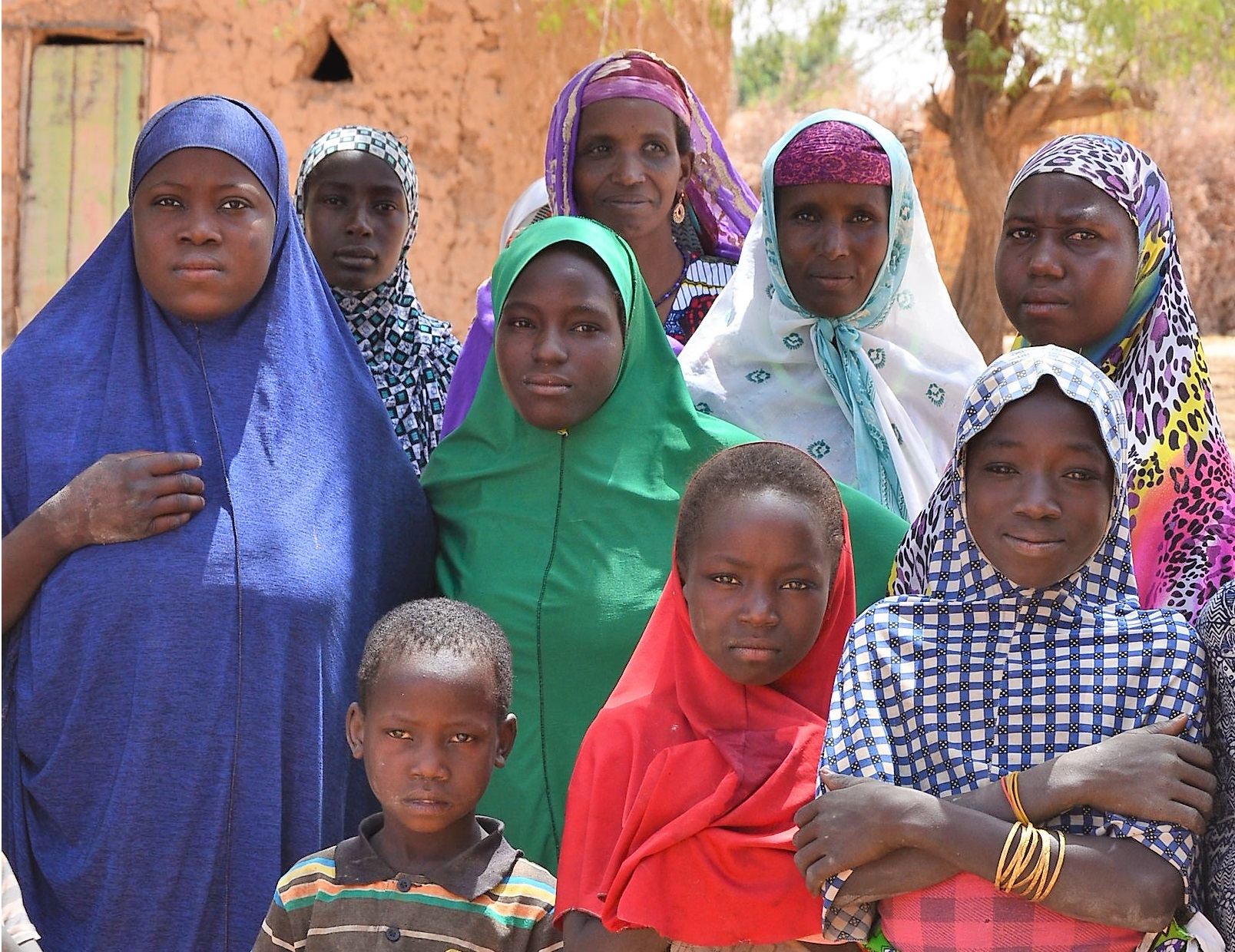
Child Brides are more present in Niger than in any other country on the globe.

Families who struggle financially are often the first to marry their daughter(s) off for the bride price that comes along with marriage in Niger. Families who agree to give their daughters hand in marriage receive some form of payment from the groom or the groom's family, and they are also lifted of the financial responsibility of their daughter. Many families report that if a wealthy man offers a large sum of money for their daughter's hand in marriage, they have no choice but to allow the marriage due to their financial struggles, regardless of their daughter's age. Daughters are taught that marriage is not about love or about liking their spouse, but about gaining financial stability. Early marriages do, however, increase adolescent pregnancy, increasing Niger's population and in turn, increasing poverty rates.

Married women have little access to any form of education. Married women claim to regret not having the opportunity to attend school. Unmarried women report that they feel as though their plans of gaining an education or job would be hindered by marriage. These women also report that they feel as though marriage is a way to gain protection and security, but that without their husbands, they would be left with nothing. Thus, many women would like to receive an education before being married which is not possible, as reported, for women who are married at an early age.

The government in Niger has recognized the problems and struggles the country faces in regards to unreported child marriages as well as the abuse and discrimination of women. There have been several laws and acts passed that are meant to help with these issues in Niger such as the civil rights code, the penal code, the Convention on the Right of the Child (1999), the National Policy on Gender (2008), and the Convention of Elimination of All Forms of Discrimination against Women (1999). Still, there is little to no change in the customs of child marriage and gender-based discrimination in Niger. Other organizations have formed in hopes to end child marriage in Niger, such as Plan International Niger (PIN).

== Women's rights ==
Niger's overall literacy rate is one of the lowest in the world, with a national average of 19.1% with women's literacy at 11%. Education, although accessible, is not common for young women. Less than a quarter of women, of all ages, were enrolled in the education system.

Gender based violence is also omnipresent in Niger. There is very little judicial assistance when it comes to the prosecution of the abusers. It has been reported that some women in Niger find it normal to be victims of domestic violence. Traditional practices often prevail as society has deemed women inferior and therefore customary to leave the abused without justice. Violence against Nigerien women has been legitimized by generations of this culture and hardly any legal regulations to change its course. Provisions have been taken to reduce the prevalence of violence, but they have fallen short of causing a noticeable change.

== See also ==
- Polygamy in Niger
- Human trafficking in Niger
- Women in Africa
