= Guérewol =

Annual ritual courtship competition among the Wodaabe Fula people of Niger

Video of a Guérewol performance.

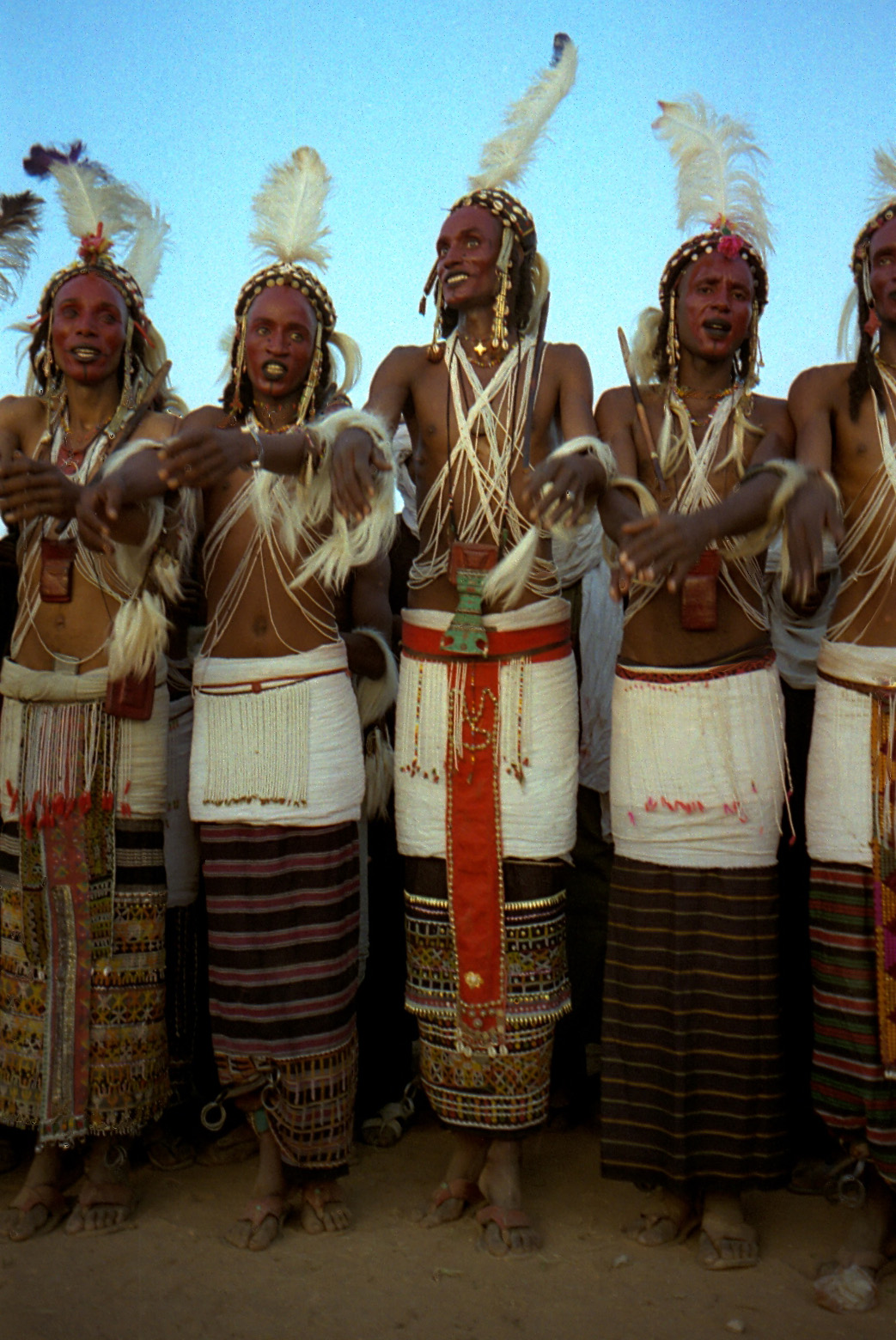
Participants in the Guérewol perform the Guérewol dance. The eventual winner was the tall young man in the middle. Photographed 1997 in Niger.

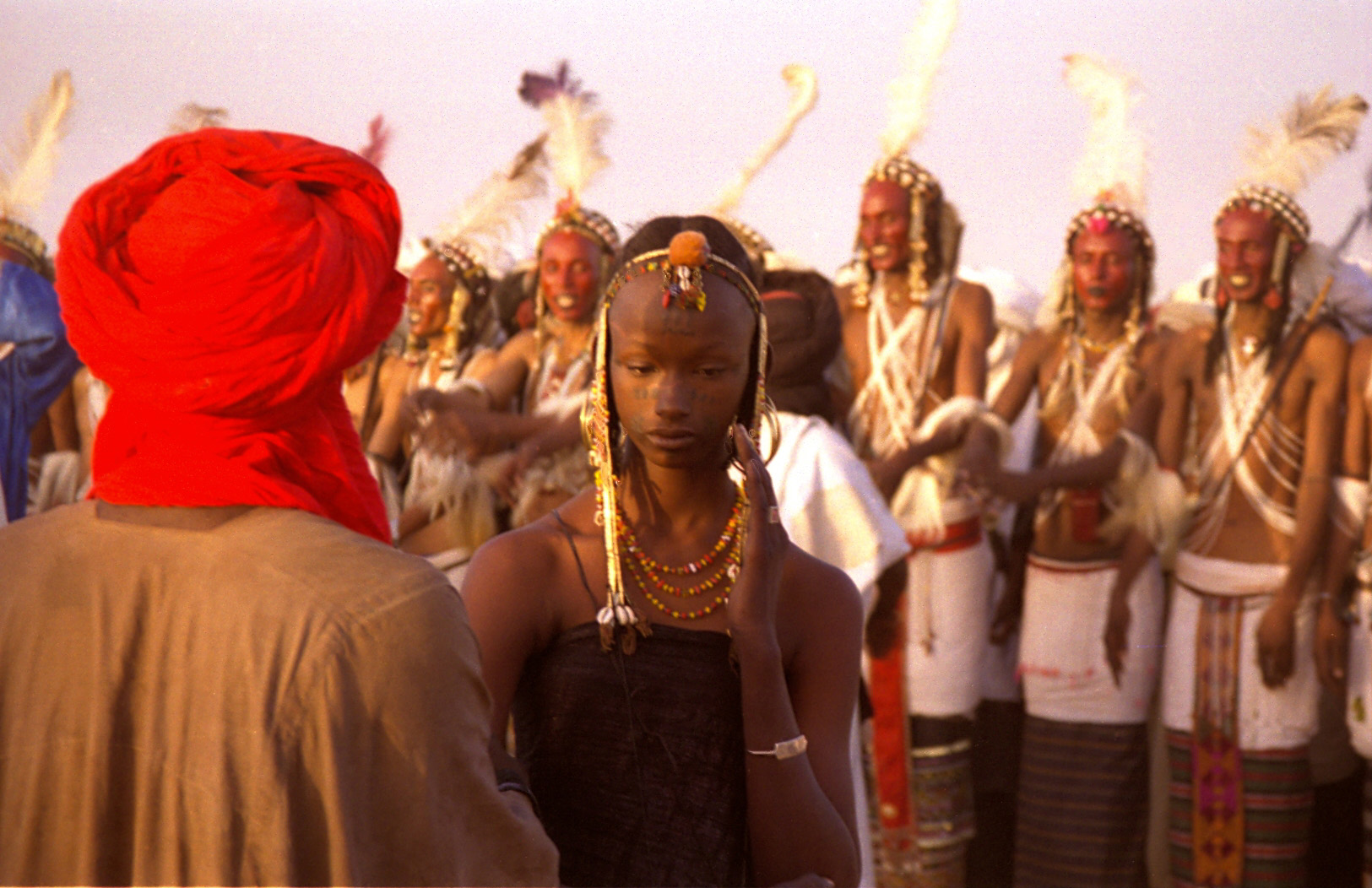
A young maiden judges men competing in a Guérewol in 1997.

The Guérewol (var. Guerewol, Gerewol) is an annual courtship ritual competition among the Wodaabe Fula people of Niger. Young men dressed in elaborate ornamentation and made up in traditional face painting gather in lines to dance and sing, vying for the attentions of marriageable young women. The Guérewol occurs each year as the traditionally nomadic Wodaabe cattle herders gather at the southern edge of the Sahara before dispersing south on their dry season pastures.

The most famous gathering point is In-Gall in northwest Niger, where a large festival, market and series of clan meetings take place for both the Wodaabe and the pastoral Tuareg people. The actual dance event is called the Yaake, while other less famous elements—bartering over dowry, competitions or camel races among suitors—make up the week-long Guérewol. The Guérewol is found wherever Wodaabe gather: from Niamey, to other places the Wodaabe travel in their transhumance cycle, as far afield as northern Cameroon and Nigeria.

== Annual gathering ==
At the end of the rainy season in September, the Wodaabe travel to In-Gall to gather salt and participate at the Cure Salée festival, a meeting of several nomadic groups. Here the young Wodaabe men, with elaborate make-up, feathers and other adornments, perform dances and songs to impress women. The male beauty ideal of the Wodaabe stresses tallness, white eyes and teeth; the men will often roll their eyes and show their teeth to emphasize these characteristics. The Wodaabe clans will then join for their week-long Guérewol celebration, a contest where the young men's beauty is judged by young women.

== Music and dance ==
The music and line dancing is typical of Fula traditions, which have largely disappeared among the vast diaspora of Fula people, many of whom are educated, Muslim, urbanites. This is characterized by group singing, accompanied by clapping, stomping and bells. The Wodaabe Guérewol festival is one of the more famous examples of this style of repeating, hypnotic, and percussive choral traditions, accompanied by swaying line dancing, where the men interlink arms and rise and fall on their toes.

The Guérewol competitions involve the ornamented young men dancing the Yaake in a line, facing a young marriageable woman, sometimes repeatedly over a seven-day period, and for hours on end in the desert sun. Suitors come to the encampment of the woman to prove their interest, stamina, and attractiveness. The participants often drink a fermented bark concoction to enable them to dance for long periods, which reputedly has a hallucinogenic effect.

== Tourism ==
The Guérewol ritual has become a foreign tourist attraction since western films, and magazines such as National Geographic have prominently featured images of the stylized performance.

== See also ==
- Herdsmen of the Sun, 1989 documentary film by Werner Herzog.
