= Cure Salee =

The Cure Salée (French: "Salt Cure"), or "Festival of the Nomads", is a yearly gathering of the Tuareg and Wodaabe peoples in the northern Niger town of In-Gall. The ceremony marks the end of the rainy season, and usually occurs in the last two weeks of September. The government of Niger began sponsoring the festival in the 1990s, fixing its date for each year (in 2006: September 11), its duration (three days), and bringing in dignitaries, performers, and tourists.

== Traditions ==
The end of the rainy season is an especially important event in the lives of Saharan pastoralists. Tuareg clans gather at the salt flats and pools near In-Gall to refresh their cattle and goat herds, and to prepare for the trip further south so they can survive the dry season. The Cure Salée is also believed to benefit the local people, and medicinal cures are a major part of the festival.

For Tuareg and Wodaabe peoples, Cure Salée marks the time of traditional courtship and marriage. The most famous images of the festival are Wodaabe tradition of Gerewol, in which young men vie for the attention of women seeking husbands. Organized dances and tests of skill culminate in men donning traditional costume, headdress, and elaborate makeup.

Amongst the Tuareg peoples, women seek for the attention of marriageable men, while men of all ages show off their skills as riders, artists, dancers, musicians and craftsmen. A great parade of Tuareg camel riders opens the festival, which continues with races, songs, dances, and storytelling. While the official festival is limited to three days, the festivities can last for weeks while nomadic groups remain in the area.

== Changes ==
While the Cure Salée has been taking place for several hundred years, independence from France in 1960 brought the involvement of the central government from Niamey, and the attempt to formalise it as a national festival and tourist attraction. Between 1990 and 1995, the ongoing Tuareg Rebellion meant that no official Cure Salee was held. In September 2000, a "Flamme du Paix" ceremonial 'Burning of Weapons' by the rebel and government forces in Agadez forced the first Cure Salée following the final peace deals to be hastily rescheduled.

On September 17, 2001, a much publicized Tuareg memorial was held for the victims of the 9/11 attacks in the United States.

In recent years, the Niger government has tried to promote the Cure Salée, creating a tourist festival (sponsored by large international corporations like Coca-Cola) for western visitors, and using the cross-ethnic traditions of the Cure Salée to foster "a celebration of social cohesion in Niger".

The [UN Joint Programme on HIV/AIDS], UNICEF, and the Niger government have begun using Cure Salée to provide aid in stemming HIV infection, and as well as malaria, guinea worm, malnutrition and encourage the use of vaccines to control preventable diseases. Vaccines and treatment of livestock, many bound for more heavily populated southern Niger, have also been mandated by the government. The 2004-2006 drought and famine in much of Niger has also focused attention on food aid at the Cure Salée.
