= Herdsmen of the Sun =

- Directed by: Werner Herzog
- Produced by: Patrick Sandrin
- Narrated by: Werner Herzog
- Cinematography: Jörg Schmidt-Reitwein
- Edited by: Maximiliane Mainka
- Release date: 1989
- Running time: 52 minutes
- Country: West Germany
- Languages: German; English; Fula

Herdsmen of the Sun (German: Wodaabe – Die Hirten der Sonne) is a 1989 documentary film by Werner Herzog. The film explores the social rituals and cultural celebrations of the Saharan nomadic Wodaabe tribe. Particular focus is given to the Gerewol celebration, which features an elaborate male beauty contest to win wives.

Although the film may be considered to be ethnographic, Herzog commented that: "[My films] are anthropological only in as much as they try to explore the human condition at this particular time on this planet. I do not make films using images only of clouds and trees, I work with human beings because the way they function in different cultural groups interests me. If that makes me an anthropologist then so be it."
