= Azawagh Arabs =

Nomadic Arab ethnic group in Niger, Mali, and Algeria

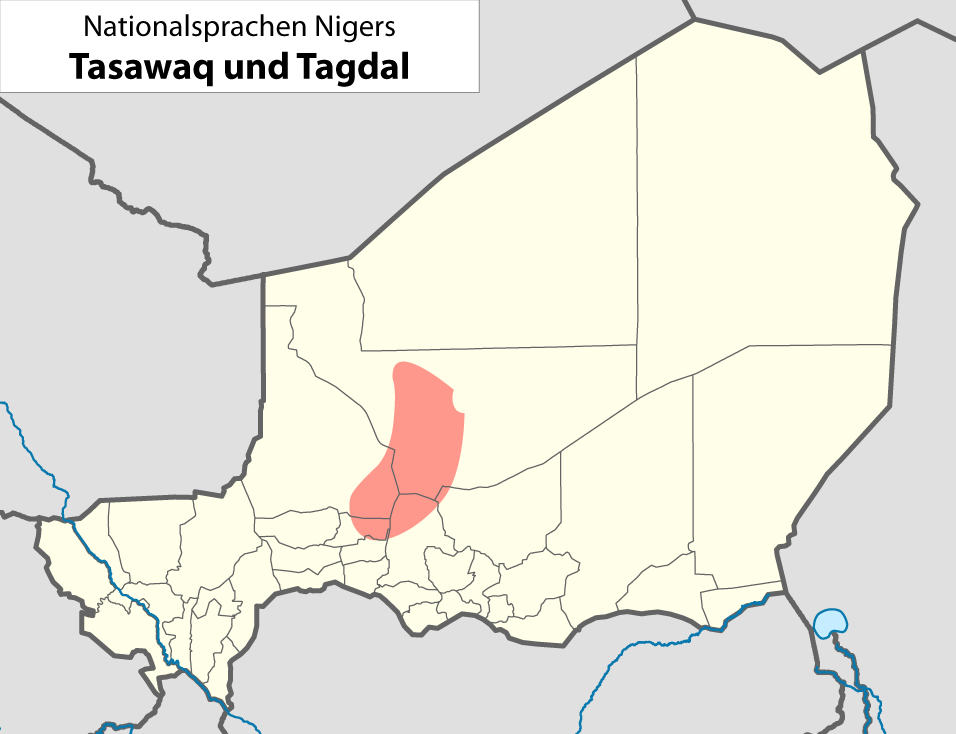

Total population
- 300,000

Regions with significant populations
- Algeria: at least 250,000; Mali: at least 40,000; Niger: at least 10,000

Languages
- Hassaniya Arabic

Religion
- Sunni Islam

Related ethnic groups
- Arabs (Bedouin groups)

The Azawagh Arabs (Arabic: عرب أزواغ) (also known as nomadic Moors) are nomadic ethnic Arab-ancestry tribes who are settling mainly in the area of Azawagh which is a dry basin covering what is today northwestern Niger, as well as parts of northeastern Mali and southern Algeria.

Azawagh Arabs are named after the Azawagh region of the Sahara and speak Hassaniya Arabic which is one of the regional varieties of Arabic.

== See also ==
- Azawagh
- Moors
- Baggara
- Diffa Arabs
