= Demographics of Niger =

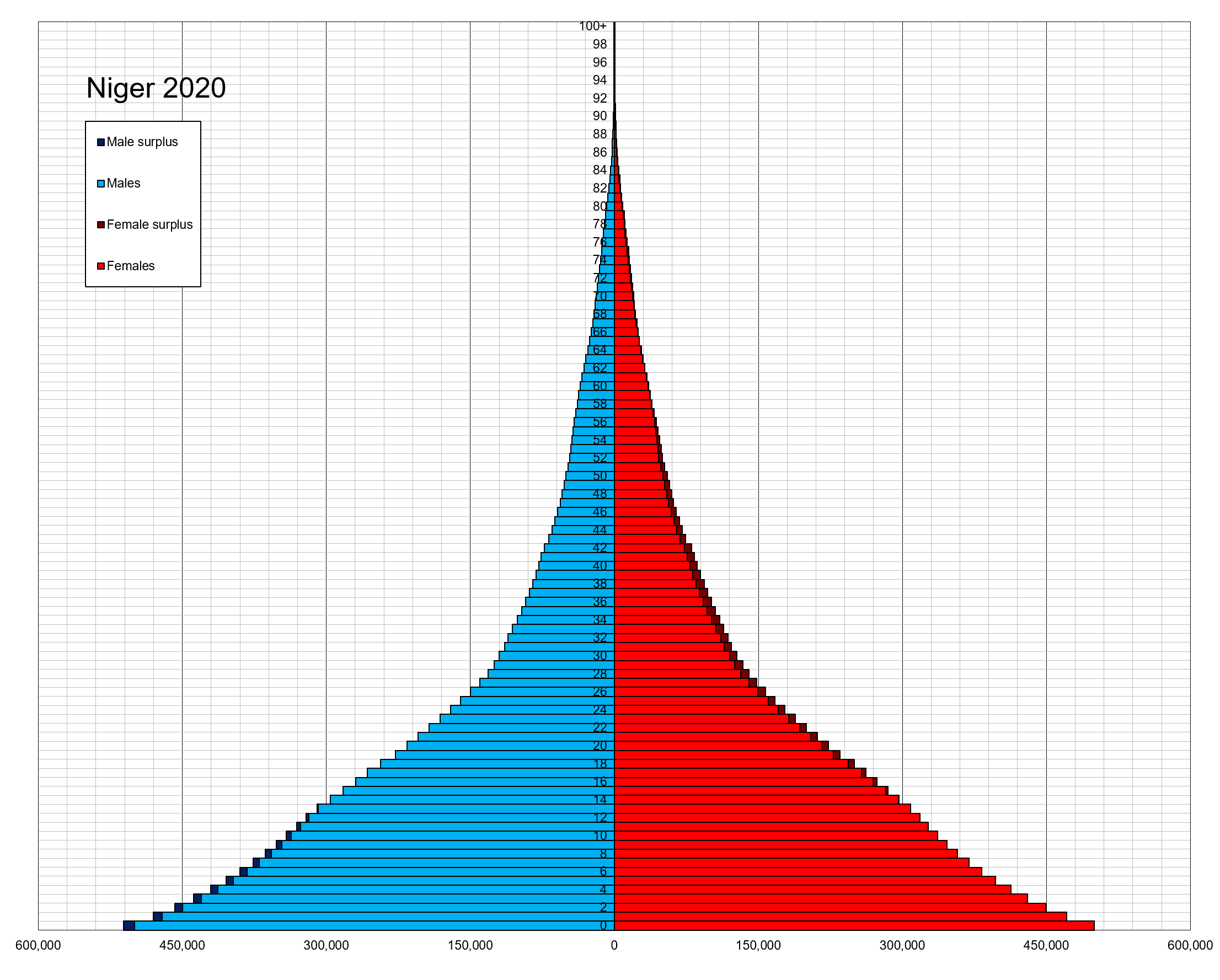
- Population pyramid of Niger in 2020
- Population: 24,484,587 (2022 est.)
- Growth rate: 3.66% (2022 est.)
- Birth rate: 40.8 births/1,000 population (2025 est.)
- Death rate: 8.6 deaths/1,000 population (2025 est.)
- Life expectancy: 60.09 years
  - male: 58.55 years
  - female: 61.68 years
- Fertility rate: 5.79 children born/woman (2025 est.)
- Infant mortality: 66.81 deaths/1,000 live births
- Net migration rate: -0.64 migrant(s)/1,000 population (2022 est.)

Age structure
- 0–14 years: 50.58%
- 15–64 years: 46.74%
- 65 and over: 2.68%

Nationality
- Nationality: Nigerien

Language
- Official: Hausa
- Spoken: Languages of Niger, French (working language)

The demographic features of Nigeriens, the people of Niger, consist of population density, ethnicity, education level, health of the populace, economic status, religious affiliations, and other aspects of the population.

The Hausa people constitute the largest ethnic group in Niger, accounting for over 56% of the country's population. The second-largest ethnic group are the Zarma-Songhai (also spelled Djerma-Songhai), who also are found in parts of Mali. Both groups are sedentary farmers who live in the arable, southern tier. The Kanouri (including Beri Beri, Manga) make up the majority of sedentary population in the far southeast of the nation. The remainder of the Nigerien people are nomadic or seminomadic livestock-raising peoples—Tuareg, Fulani, Toubou and Diffa Arabs. With rapidly growing populations and the consequent competition for meager natural resources, lifestyles of these two types of peoples have come increasingly into conflict in Niger in recent years.

Niger's high infant mortality rate is comparable to levels recorded in neighboring countries. However, the child mortality rate (deaths among children between the ages of 1 and 4) is exceptionally high (274 per 1,000) due to generally poor health conditions and inadequate nutrition for most of the country's children. Niger's very high total fertility rate (6.89 children born per woman, which is the highest in the world), nonetheless, means that nearly half (49%) of the Nigerien population is under age 15. School attendance is low (34%), including 38% of males and 27% of females. Additional education occurs through Koranic schools.

== Population ==
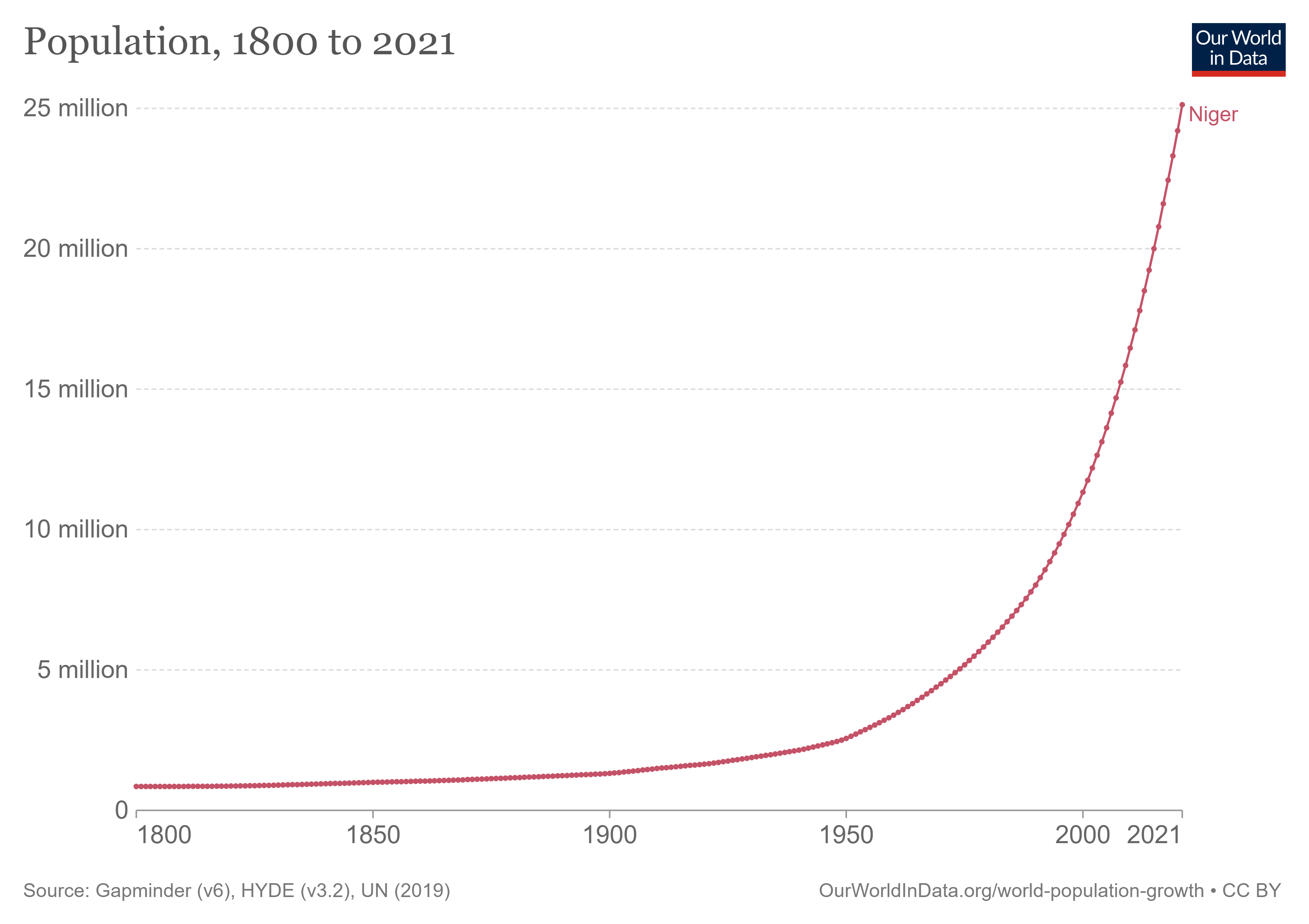
Demographics of Niger, Data of Our World in Data, year 2022; Number of inhabitants in millions.

Year	Population (persons)	%+
1960	3,240,000	—
1970	4,210,000	29.9%
1980	5,578,000	32.5%
1990	7,754,610	39.0%
2000	10,492,569	35.3%
2010	15,203,822	44.9%
2020	22,750,000	49.6%

Source: Institut National de la Statistique - Niger

=== Census results ===
Historical population
Year	Pop.	±%
1	100,000	—
1500	1,000,000	+900.0%
1900	1,700,000	+70.0%
1977	5,102,990	+200.2%
1988	7,251,626	+42.1%
2001	11,060,291	+52.5%
2012	17,138,707	+55.0%

=== UN estimates ===
Estimated population, fertility rate and net reproduction rate by year according to United Nations estimates

According to the 2022 revision of the World Population Prospects the total population was 25,252,722 in 2021, compared to only 2 462 000 in 1950. The proportion of children and teenagers below the age of 15 in 2010 was 49%, 48.8% was between 15 and 65 years of age, while only 2.2% was 65 years or older.

	Total population	Population aged 0–14 (%)	Population aged 15–64 (%)	Population aged 65+ (%)
1950	2 462 000	49.5	49.6	0.9
1955	2 834 000	48.1	51.1	0.8
1960	3 250 000	47.1	51.8	1.1
1965	3 766 000	46.9	51.7	1.3
1970	4 373 000	47.7	50.8	1.5
1975	5 071 000	48.1	50.3	1.6
1980	5 871 000	48.0	50.3	1.7
1985	6 744 000	48.2	49.9	1.9
1990	7 788 000	48.3	49.7	2.0
1995	9 179 000	48.3	49.6	2.1
2000	10 922 000	48.5	49.4	2.1
2005	12 994 000	48.9	49.0	2.1
2010	15 512 000	49.0	48.8	2.2

Population Estimates by Sex and Age Group (01.VII.2017):

Age group	Male	Female	Total	%
Total	10 296 315	10 354 759	20 651 074	100
0–4	2 079 319	2 032 648	4 111 966	19.91
5–9	1 845 949	1 754 522	3 600 471	17.43
10–14	1 503 877	1 449 930	2 953 806	14.30
15–19	1 073 645	1 060 174	2 133 819	10.33
20–24	820 282	878 703	1 698 985	8.23
25–29	619 222	676 218	1 295 439	6.27
30–34	510 322	538 449	1 048 771	5.08
35–39	420 240	455 969	876 209	4.24
40–44	339 682	369 270	708 952	3.43
45–49	274 985	286 234	561 219	2.72
50–54	230 659	244 922	475 582	2.30
55–59	181 127	185 004	366 130	1.77
60–64	134 934	140 036	274 970	1.33
65-69	96 579	100 335	196 914	0.95
70-74	70 314	76 325	146 638	0.71
75-79	48 176	51 958	100 134	0.48
80+	47 003	54 062	101 065	0.49
Age group	Male	Female	Total	Percent
0–14	5 429 145	5 237 100	10 666 245	51.65
15–64	4 605 098	4 834 979	9 440 077	45.71
65+	262 072	282 680	544 752	2.64

View source data.
View source data.
View source data.
View source data.

== Vital statistics ==
Registration of vital events in Niger is incomplete. The website Our World in Data prepared the following estimates based on statistics from the Population Department of the United Nations.

	Mid-year population	Live births	Deaths	Natural change	Crude birth rate (per 1000)	Crude death rate (per 1000)	Natural change (per 1000)	Total fertility rate (TFR)	Infant mortality (per 1000 live births)	Life expectancy (in years)
1950	2,569,000	153,000	68,000	84,000	59.4	26.6	32.8	7.56	130.2	36.25
1951	2,660,000	158,000	72,000	86,000	59.3	27.0	32.3	7.56	130.3	36.21
1952	2,750,000	163,000	75,000	88,000	59.2	27.4	31.8	7.56	130.4	36.17
1953	2,839,000	168,000	78,000	89,000	59.0	27.6	31.4	7.55	130.5	36.13
1954	2,928,000	172,000	81,000	92,000	58.9	27.6	31.2	7.55	130.5	36.19
1955	3,019,000	177,000	84,000	94,000	58.7	27.7	31.1	7.55	130.5	36.22
1956	3,110,000	182,000	86,000	96,000	58.5	27.6	30.9	7.54	130.4	36.30
1957	3,203,000	187,000	88,000	99,000	58.4	27.6	30.8	7.54	130.4	36.33
1958	3,298,000	193,000	91,000	101,000	58.3	27.6	30.7	7.54	130.3	36.35
1959	3,396,000	198,000	94,000	104,000	58.2	27.6	30.6	7.53	130.2	36.35
1960	3,497,000	203,000	96,000	107,000	58.1	27.6	30.6	7.53	130.1	36.40
1961	3,603,000	209,000	99,000	110,000	57.9	27.4	30.5	7.51	130.0	36.56
1962	3,711,000	214,000	102,000	113,000	57.7	27.4	30.3	7.50	129.9	36.64
1963	3,823,000	220,000	104,000	115,000	57.5	27.3	30.2	7.49	129.9	36.74
1964	3,937,000	225,000	107,000	118,000	57.2	27.3	29.9	7.48	129.9	36.74
1965	4,054,000	230,000	110,000	120,000	56.8	27.2	29.5	7.47	129.9	36.75
1966	4,173,000	236,000	113,000	123,000	56.6	27.2	29.4	7.48	130.0	36.81
1967	4,294,000	242,000	117,000	125,000	56.3	27.1	29.2	7.49	130.0	36.83
1968	4,418,000	247,000	121,000	127,000	56.0	27.4	28.6	7.50	131.4	36.61
1969	4,543,000	254,000	126,000	128,000	55.8	27.6	28.2	7.51	132.7	36.35
1970	4,670,000	260,000	130,000	130,000	55.7	27.9	27.8	7.51	134.2	36.06
1971	4,797,000	267,000	138,000	129,000	55.7	28.7	27.0	7.52	136.8	35.29
1972	4,926,000	274,000	140,000	134,000	55.6	28.4	27.2	7.52	136.7	35.63
1973	5,059,000	281,000	144,000	138,000	55.6	28.4	27.2	7.53	137.6	35.70
1974	5,197,000	289,000	146,000	143,000	55.6	28.2	27.5	7.54	138.0	36.00
1975	5,339,000	297,000	148,000	149,000	55.7	27.7	28.0	7.54	137.6	36.59
1976	5,489,000	306,000	150,000	155,000	55.6	27.3	28.3	7.56	136.7	36.98
1977	5,645,000	315,000	151,000	163,000	55.7	26.8	28.9	7.60	135.4	37.64
1978	5,810,000	327,000	152,000	175,000	56.2	26.2	30.1	7.66	133.8	38.45
1979	5,987,000	340,000	154,000	186,000	56.7	25.7	31.0	7.72	132.5	39.20
1980	6,173,000	353,000	157,000	195,000	57.1	25.4	31.6	7.78	131.6	39.68
1981	6,366,000	365,000	161,000	204,000	57.3	25.2	32.0	7.82	131.4	40.17
1982	6,564,000	375,000	166,000	209,000	57.1	25.3	31.8	7.86	132.0	40.30
1983	6,767,000	385,000	172,000	214,000	56.9	25.4	31.5	7.90	133.2	40.36
1984	6,974,000	399,000	179,000	219,000	57.1	25.7	31.4	7.92	134.8	40.06
1985	7,188,000	409,000	186,000	224,000	56.9	25.8	31.1	7.93	136.1	40.03
1986	7,408,000	418,000	191,000	227,000	56.4	25.8	30.6	7.90	137.0	40.13
1987	7,637,000	429,000	195,000	235,000	56.2	25.5	30.7	7.87	137.3	40.43
1988	7,872,000	438,000	198,000	240,000	55.6	25.1	30.5	7.84	136.9	40.79
1989	8,116,000	448,000	200,000	248,000	55.2	24.7	30.6	7.82	135.8	41.22
1990	8,371,000	462,000	202,000	260,000	55.2	24.1	31.1	7.81	134.2	41.85
1991	8,635,000	473,000	204,000	269,000	54.8	23.7	31.1	7.80	132.1	42.22
1992	8,908,000	486,000	205,000	281,000	54.5	23.0	31.5	7.80	129.2	42.95
1993	9,193,000	499,000	204,000	295,000	54.3	22.2	32.0	7.79	125.8	43.82
1994	9,493,000	512,000	203,000	309,000	54.0	21.4	32.5	7.79	121.9	44.71
1995	9,814,000	531,000	201,000	329,000	54.1	20.5	33.5	7.78	117.5	45.77
1996	10,150,000	548,000	201,000	347,000	53.9	19.8	34.2	7.76	113.2	46.68
1997	10,494,000	564,000	200,000	363,000	53.7	19.1	34.6	7.76	109.2	47.51
1998	10,855,000	580,000	201,000	379,000	53.4	18.5	34.9	7.76	105.7	48.19
1999	11,231,000	595,000	202,000	393,000	53.0	18.0	35.0	7.75	102.4	48.74
2000	11,623,000	612,000	203,000	410,000	52.7	17.4	35.2	7.73	99.2	49.32
2001	12,031,000	629,000	204,000	425,000	52.2	16.9	35.3	7.70	95.9	49.84
2002	12,457,000	646,000	203,000	443,000	51.8	16.3	35.6	7.67	92.2	50.56
2003	12,901,000	664,000	201,000	464,000	51.5	15.5	35.9	7.65	88.2	51.43
2004	13,367,000	683,000	196,000	487,000	51.1	14.7	36.4	7.63	84.0	52.59
2005	13,855,000	702,000	193,000	509,000	50.6	13.9	36.7	7.62	80.0	53.59
2006	14,365,000	720,000	189,000	531,000	50.1	13.2	36.9	7.58	76.0	54.60
2007	14,898,000	741,000	186,000	555,000	49.7	12.5	37.2	7.56	72.2	55.55
2008	15,455,000	762,000	183,000	580,000	49.3	11.8	37.5	7.54	68.5	56.51
2009	16,038,000	784,000	180,000	605,000	48.9	11.2	37.7	7.51	65.0	57.40
2010	16,648,000	808,000	176,000	632,000	48.5	10.6	37.9	7.49	61.8	58.37
2011	17,283,000	830,000	175,000	654,000	48.0	10.1	37.8	7.45	58.8	58.99
2012	17,954,000	851,000	174,000	676,000	47.4	9.7	37.7	7.40	56.3	59.65
2013	18,653,000	879,000	174,000	705,000	47.1	9.3	37.8	7.34	54.1	60.24
2014	19,372,000	906,000	175,000	731,000	46.8	9.0	37.7	7.28	52.1	60.79
2015	20,128,000	937,000	177,000	760,000	46.6	8.8	37.8	7.21	50.4	61.08
2016	20,922,000	973,000	178,000	795,000	46.5	8.5	38.0	7.14	48.7	61.63
2017	21,738,000	1,008,000	179,000	829,000	46.4	8.2	38.1	7.08	47.3	62.16
2018	22,577,000	1,042,000	182,000	860,000	46.1	8.1	38.1	7.02	45.9	62.45
2019	23,443,000	1,076,000	184,000	892,000	45.9	7.8	38.0	6.96	44.5	62.90
2020	23,781,000	1,010,000	226,000	784,000	42.6	9.5	33.1	6.37	66.5	59.9
2021	24,502,000	1,027,000	234,000	793,000	41.9	9.6	32.4	6.20	65.9	59.5
2022	25,312,000	1,062,000	232,000	830,000	42.0	9.2	32.8	6.14	65.3	60.4
2023	26,160,000	1,096,000	232,000	864,000	41.9	8.9	33.0	6.06	64.6	61.2
2024					41.4	8.7	32.7	5.94		
2025					40.8	8.6	32.2	5.79		

=== Demographic and Health Surveys ===
Total fertility rate (TFR; Wanted Fertility Rate) and crude birth rate (CBR):

Year	Total		Urban		Rural	
Year	CBR	TFR	CBR	TFR	CBR	TFR
1988		7.51				
1992		7.37 (7,1)		6.71 (6,3)		7.52 (7,3)
1998	52.8	7.5 (7,2)	44.0	5.9 (5,6)	55.0	7.9 (7,7)
2006	46.1	7.1 (6,9)	40.7	6.0 (5,6)	47.1	7.4 (7,2)
2012	46.6	7.6 (6,8)	39.0	5.6 (4,7)	48.1	8.1 (7,3)

Fertility data as of 2012 (DHS Program):

Region	Total fertility rate	Percentage of women age 15-49 currently pregnant	Mean number of children ever born to women age 40-49
Agadez	5.7	9.2	7.1
Diffa	6.4	11.0	6.3
Dosso	7.5	11.7	7.7
Maradi	8.4	16.4	9.0
Tahoua	7.3	13.0	7.5
Tillabéri	7.9	15.6	7.8
Zinder	8.5	17.3	8.6
Niamey	5.3	9.6	5.9

== Ethnic groups ==
Ethnic map of Niger: Hausa Zarma-Songhai Tuareg Fulani Kanuri Toubou Arab Gurma

Population of Niger according to ethnic group in 1988 and 2001 censuses
Ethnic group	census 1988		census 2001	
Ethnic group	#	%	#	%
Hausa	3,770,927	53.0%	6,069,731	55.4%
Zarma-Songhai	1,511,341	21.2%	2,300,874	21.0%
Tuareg	739,202	10.4%	1,016,883	9.3%
Fulani	694,428	9.8%	935,517	8.5%
Kanuri	316,471	4.4%	513,116	4.7%
Gurma	19,714	0.3%	39,797	0.4%
Toubou	31,403	0.4%	42,172	0.4%
Arab	24,178	0.3%	40,085	0.4%
Other	12,265	0.2%	5,951	0.1%
Total	7,119,929		10,964,126	

== Core health indicators ==
World Health Organization 2007 statistics: Core Health Indicators for Niger
Indicator		Value	(year)
Life expectancy at birth (years)	males	61.05	(2015)
Life expectancy at birth (years)	females	62.9	(2015)
Healthy life expectancy (HALE) at birth (years)	males	36.0	(2002)
Healthy life expectancy (HALE) at birth (years)	females	35.0	(2002)
Probability of dying (per 1 000 population) between 15 and 60 years (adult mortality rate)	males	502	(2005)
Probability of dying (per 1 000 population) between 15 and 60 years (adult mortality rate)	females	478	(2005)
Total expenditure on health as percentage of gross domestic product		4.2	(2004)
Per capita total expenditure on health at international dollar rate		25.9	(2004)
Population (in thousands) total		13957	(2005)

== Religion ==
- Islam: 99.3%,
- Christianity: 0.3%,
- Animism: 0.2%
- None: 0.1% (2012 est.)

== Languages ==
- Hausa (official)
- Zarma (Djerma)
- French (former official)

== See also ==
- Seasonal migration in Niger
- Women in Niger
- LGBT rights in Niger
