= Poverty in Niger =

Poverty in Niger is widespread and enduring in one of the world's most impoverished countries. In 2015, the United Nations (UN) Human Development Index ranked Niger as the second least-developed of 188 countries. Additionally, in 2015 the Global Finance Magazine ranked Niger 7th among the twenty-three poorest countries in the world. Two out of three residents live below the poverty line and more than 40 percent of the population earn less than $1 a day. Civil war, terror, illness, disease, poverty and hunger plague Niger. Hunger is one of the most significant problems the population faces daily. With a national population of 19,899,120, 45.7% of this population live below the poverty line.

== Poverty by Region ==
Percent of population living on less than $2.15, $3.65 and $6.85 a day, international dollars (2017 PPP) as per the World Bank.

Percent of population living on less than poverty thresholds
Region	$2.15	$3.65	$6.85	Year
Agadez	17.7%	53.5%	83.6%	2018
Diffa	42.0%	76.9%	95.0%	2018
Dosso	52.3%	85.1%	97.8%	2018
Maradi	59.8%	88.1%	97.1%	2018
Tahoua	50.0%	85.2%	97.9%	2018
Tillaberi	47.1%	82.9%	97.3%	2018
Zinder	61.1%	86.5%	97.9%	2018
Niamey	4.6%	20.9%	57.5%	2018
Niger	40.6%	81.1%	95.0%	2018

== Food insecurity ==
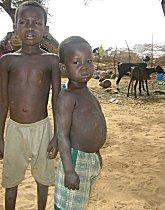
Malnourished children in Niger, during the 2005 famine.

Representing nearly 35% of the population, an estimated 5.4 million citizens are food-insecure. Around 40% of children are underweight. Two and a half million people experience hunger and 800,000 children are malnourished. In January 2018, UNICEF flagged the terrorist insurgency of Boko Haram as a significant cause of the malnourishment of 400,000 children, labeling Niger as the world's most under-funded humanitarian crisis. Millions more are required humanitarian assistance after fleeing their homes. The agency warned that 90,000 children could die of Severe Acute Malnutrition in the coming year unless the international community took swift action. This amounts to more than 240 child deaths each day. The lack of food in Niger causes malnutrition and weakness, which often leads to infection and illness. One in four children dies before reaching age five. In 2015, ongoing floods, droughts, and temperature spikes attributed to climate change caused a severe food crisis compounded by water shortages.

== Water crisis ==
Niger is facing a water crisis affecting nearly 10 million people. 64.01% of rural areas lack access to water.

== See also ==
- Food insecurity in Niger
- List of countries by percentage of population living in poverty
