= In-Gall =

In-Gall In Gall, I-n-Gall, In-Gal, Ingal, Ingall
- Location within Niger
- Coordinates: 16°47′10″N 06°56′01″E
- Country: Niger
- Region: Agadez Region
- Department: In-Gall Department
- Commune: In Gall

Area
  - Total: 61,171 km^{2} (23,618 sq mi)
- Elevation: 456 m (1,496 ft)

Population (2012-12-10)
  - Total: 51,903

In-Gall (var. In Gall, I-n-Gall, In-Gal, Ingal, Ingall) is a department, commune and town in the Agadez Region of northeast Niger, with a year-round population of less than 500. Known for its oasis and salt flats, In-Gall is the gathering point for the Cure Salee festival of Tuareg and Wodaabe pastoralists to celebrate the end of the rainy season each September. During the festival, In-Gall's population grows to several thousand nomads, officials, and tourists. As of 2011, the commune had a total population of 47,170 people.

In-Gall had been a stop on the main roads between the capital of Niger, Niamey (600 km to the southwest), and the mining town of Arlit (200 km to the northeast, 150 km from the Algerian border) or the provincial capital Agadez (100 km to the east). In the 1970s, the main road was repaved to transport uranium from the French-owned mines in Arlit, but the new road bypassed In-Gall, ending its use as a waystation. Since then, its population has dropped from almost 5,000 to less than 500.

During the Tuareg insurgency of the 1990s, In-Gall was a prime fortification of the Niger armed forces, and when peace was concluded in 2000 the old fort was reportedly abandoned.

== Description ==
"InGall, an oasis town in a semi-desert zone that forms the gateway to the Sahara. InGall is a conglomeration of mud houses, whose gardens, in contrast to the barren landscape in which the town is set, are filled with fruit trees and vegetable patches."

== History ==
The history, archaeology, and culture of the In-Gall area has been extensively studied, most notably by the French anthropologist and archaeologist couple, Suzanne and Edmond Bernus.

In-Gall is not only a prominent Tuareg seasonal centre, to which certain clans return each year, but it has a history as a stop in the Trans-Saharan trade, was an eastern outpost of the Songhay Empire in the 16th century, was an important centre of the Aïr Sultanate thereafter, and became a French colonial fort in an often hostile region in the early 20th century.

=== Pre-history ===
Archaeological evidence shows the area as a centre of prehistoric populations dating back some eight thousand year to when it sat in the midst of a now dry Azawagh river valley, fed by the Aïr Massif and flowing south to the Niger River. Of particular note have been thousands of pre-common era stone burial mounds which suggest a common culture in the area. Archeologists have also found in the In-Gall region many of the earliest mosques in Niger, dating back to early Berber occupations before 1000CE.

== Salt extraction ==
In-Gall is intimately linked with the nearby salt industry at Tegguiada In Tessoum, around 15 km to the north. Teguidda, on the site of an ancient lake bed, floods as water washes down from the Aïr Massif to the east each year, producing natural salt ponds. The population of In-Gall maintain and harvest from evaporation ponds here, sending labourers from the local clans to work the salt and transport it back to In-Gall at the end of the season. In-Gall is near enough that, unlike the oasis town of Fachi where plots are owned by Agadez-based Tuareg clans and worked by a permanent population, the workers at Teguidda return to In-Gall for the remainder of the year. Teguidda also lacks a stable oasis, which provides In-Gall with market gardens and date palm farming on a year-round basis. Prior to its decline in the 20th century — because of the smaller scale of the In-Gall salt markets as well as its easy access by road — In-Gall was once a destination of the Azalai salt caravans, in which Tuareg merchants transported salt from the markets here across the Sahel for agricultural and medicinal uses.

== Uranium mining ==
In 2004, a Canadian corporation was granted a government license to mine for uranium in the area. Northwestern Mineral Ventures was awarded the Irhazer and Ingall concessions, each 2,000 square kilometres (770 sq mi) in size. Mines would reportedly be "open pit" strip mines. More than 100 uranium exploration licenses have been granted in the Azawagh area since 2004 to foreign firms from China (over 40%), Canada, and India. Since 2007, a Chinese mining consortium, whose license covers an area north of In-Gall, has carried out infrastructural work for new uranium mine at Azelik, some 85 km north of in Gall, which includes extending roads from In-Gall to the site. Nigerien human rights, environmental and Tuareg groups have argued that mining activities in this region are a threat to scarce water resources, upon which pastoralists depend. The short rainy season in the Azawagh area north and west of In-Gall makes the region the northern destination for a cattle and camel herding transhumance cycle, which sees communities travel as far south as Burkina Faso during the dry months.

== Dinosaurs ==
In-Gall is also famous to outsiders for its palaeontological digs, most notably the Jobaria tiguidensis, and the remains of petrified forests dating back 135 million years.

== Sources ==
- Abdoulkader Aghali, Koffi Kouassi. Observatoire de la décentralisation au Niger: N° 73 La commune d'In Gall (3, 2008). Laboratoire d'Etudes et de Recherche sur les Dynamiques Sociales et le Développement Local, (LASDEL), Niamey. Retrieved 2009-03-16.
- Abdoulkader Aghali, Salekh Rhousseini. Observatoire de la décentralisation au Niger: N° 61 La commune d'In Gall (2, October 2007). Laboratoire d'Etudes et de Recherche sur les Dynamiques Sociales et le Développement Local, (LASDEL), Niamey. Retrieved 2009-03-16.
- Samuel Decalo. Historical Dictionary of Niger. Scarecrow Press, London and New Jersey (1979). ISBN 0-8108-1229-0
- Niger: Intou.org. Accessed 2009-03-27.
- Jolijn Geels. Niger. Bradt London and Globe Pequot New York (2006). ISBN 1-84162-152-8.
- Michael Palin's Travel entry for Ingall
- Description of the town during the Cure Salee festival of 2000.

== Other Links ==
- Ingall
- Photo of Tuareg men at Ingal Market
- photographs of the InGall market taken by members of a French aid convoy in 2003.

16°47′N 6°56′E
