= Wodaabe =

Nomadic Fulani ethnic group

Woɗaaɓe وٛطَاٻٜ 𞤏𞤮𞤯𞤢𞥄𞤩𞤫
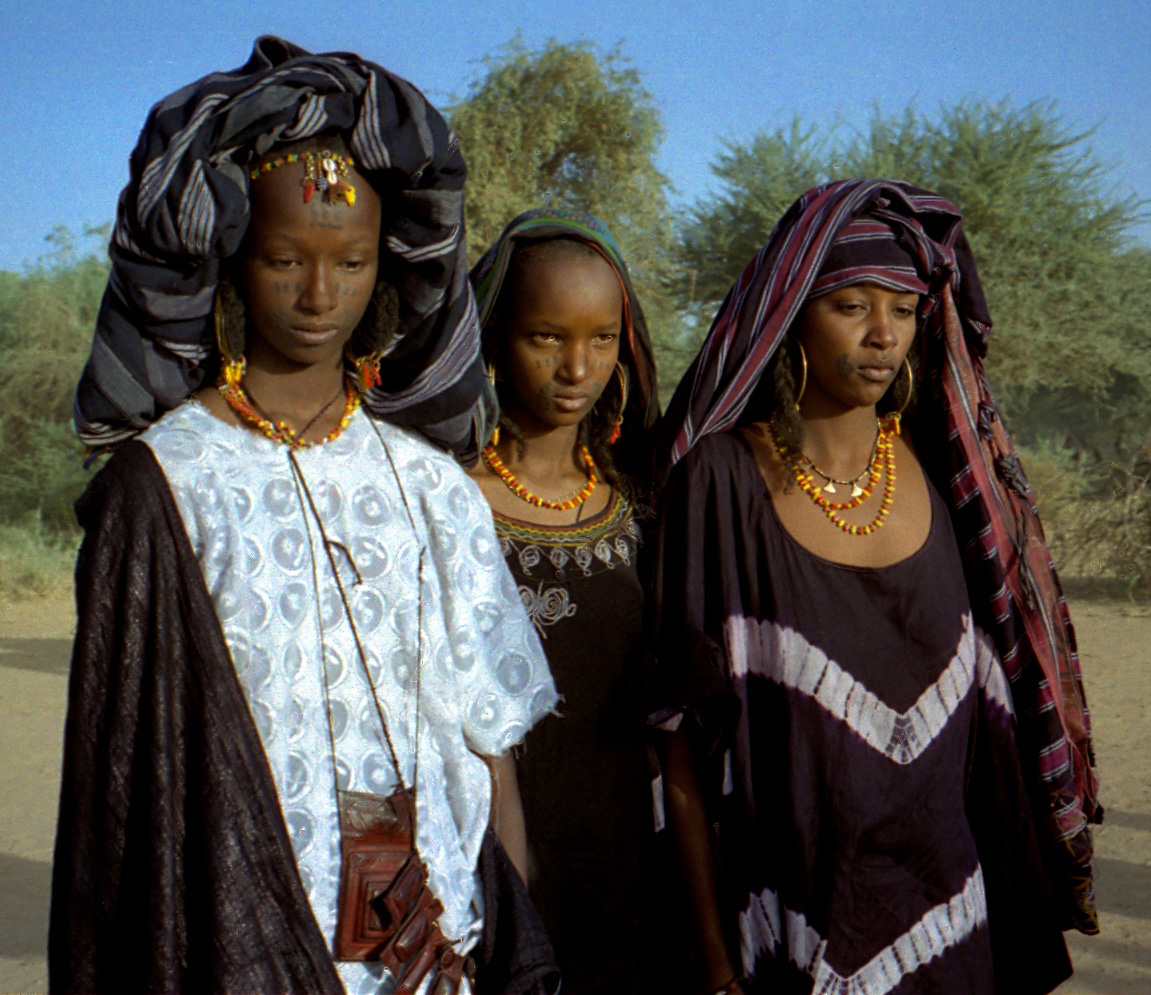
- Young Wodaabe women, Niger

Total population
- 100,000 (2001)

Regions with significant populations
- Niger, Chad, Cameroon, Central African Republic

Languages
- Fula

Religion
- Sunni Islam

Related ethnic groups
- Other Fula

The Wodaabe (Fula: Woɗaaɓe, وٛطَاٻٜ, 𞤏𞤮𞤯𞤢𞥄𞤩𞤫) is a name that is used to designate a subgroup of the Fula ethnic group who are traditionally nomadic and found primarily in Niger and Chad. All Wodaabe people should not be mistaken as Mbororo as these are two separate subgroups of the Fulani people. It is translated into English as "Cattle Fulani", and meaning "those who dwell in cattle camps". The Wodaabe culture is one of the 186 cultures of the standard cross-cultural sample used by anthropologists to compare cultural traits. A Wodaabe woman, Hindou Oumarou Ibrahim, was also chosen to represent civil society of the world on the signing of Paris Protocol on 22 April 2016.

== History ==
The Wodaabe are cattle-herders and traders in the Sahel, with migrations stretching from southern Niger, through northern Nigeria, northeastern Cameroon, southwestern Chad, western region of the Central African Republic and the northeastern of the Democratic Republic of Congo. The number of Wodaabe was estimated in 2001 to be 100,000. They are known for their elaborate attire and rich cultural ceremonies.

The Wodaabe speak the Fula language and don't use a written language. In the Fula language, woɗa means "taboo", and Woɗaaɓe means "people of the taboo." This is sometimes translated as "those who respect taboos", a reference to the Wodaabe isolation from broader Fula/Fulani culture, and their contention that they retain "older" traditions than their Fula neighbors.

By the 17th century, the Fula people across West Africa were among the first ethnic groups to embrace Islam, were often leaders of those forces which spread Islam, and have been traditionally proud of the urban, literate, and pious life with which this has been related. Both Wodaabe and other Fula see in the Wodaabe the echoes of an earlier pastoralist way of life, of which the Wodaabe are proud and of which urban Fula people are sometimes critical.

== Everyday life ==
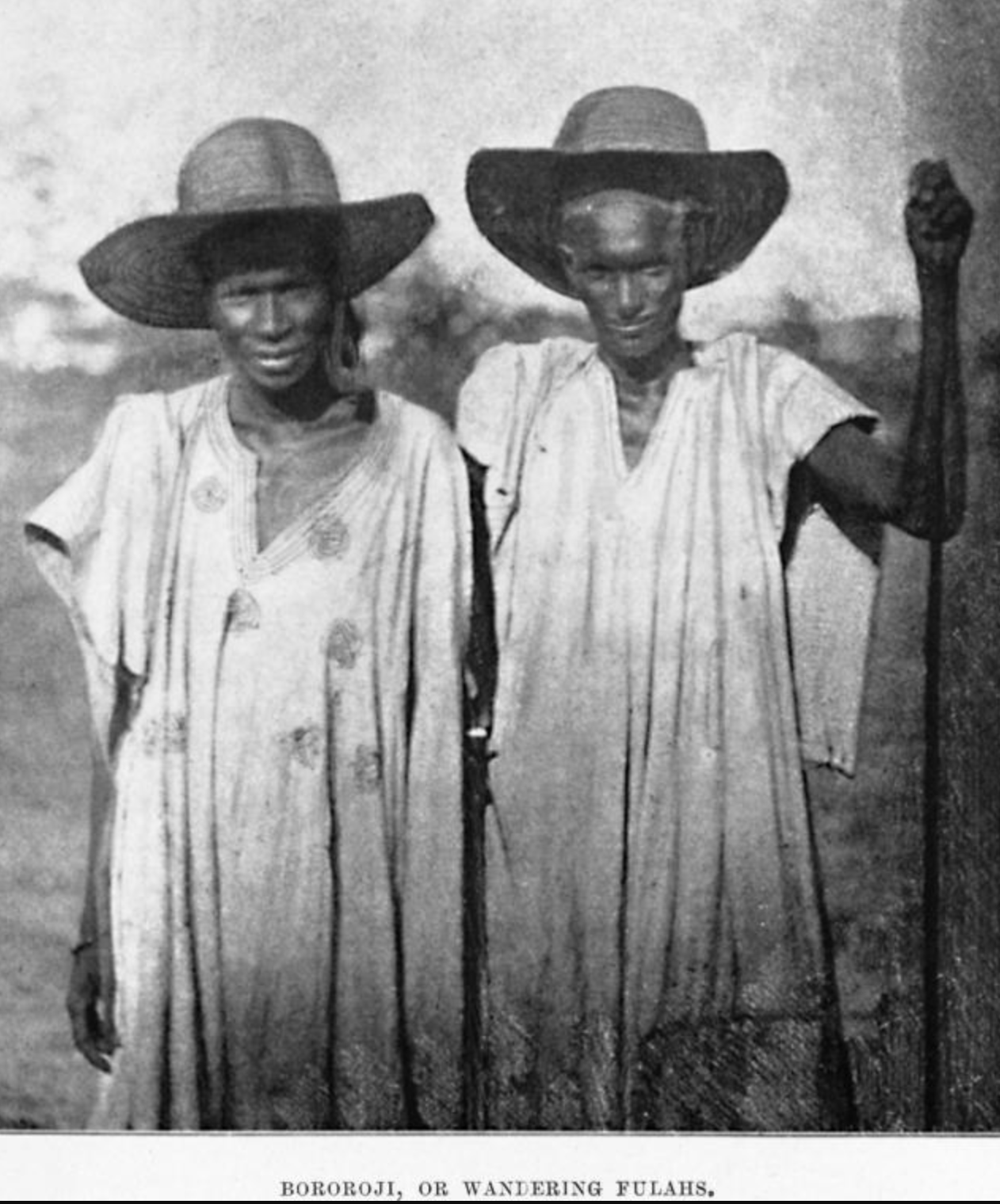
Wodaabe in Adamawa (1900)

The Wodaabe keep herds of long-horned Zebu cattle. The dry season extends from October to May. Their annual travel during the wet season follows the rain from the south to the north. Groups of several dozen relatives, typically several brothers with their wives, children and elders, travel on foot, donkey or camel, and stay at each grazing spot for a couple of days. A large wooden bed is the most important possession of each family; when camping it is surrounded by some screens. The women also carry calabashes as a status symbol. These calabashes are passed down through the generations, and often provoke rivalry between women. The Wodaabe diet consists of milk and ground millet, yogurt, sweet tea and sometimes goat or sheep meat.

== Religion, morals and customs ==
Wodaabe religion is largely Islamic (mixed with pre-Islamic beliefs). Although there are varying degrees of orthodoxy exhibited, most adhere to at least some of the basic requirements of the religion. Islam became a religion of importance among Wodaabe peoples during the 16th century when the scholar al-Maghili preached the teachings of Muhammad to the elite of northern Nigeria. Al-Maghili was responsible for converting the ruling classes among Hausa, Fula, and Tuareg peoples in the region.

The code of behavior of the Wodaabe emphasizes reserve and modesty (semteende), patience and fortitude (munyal), care and forethought (hakkilo), and loyalty (amana). They also place great emphasis on beauty and charm.

Parents are not allowed to talk directly to their two first born children, who will often be cared for by their grandparents. During daylight, husband and wife cannot hold hands or speak in a personal manner with each other.

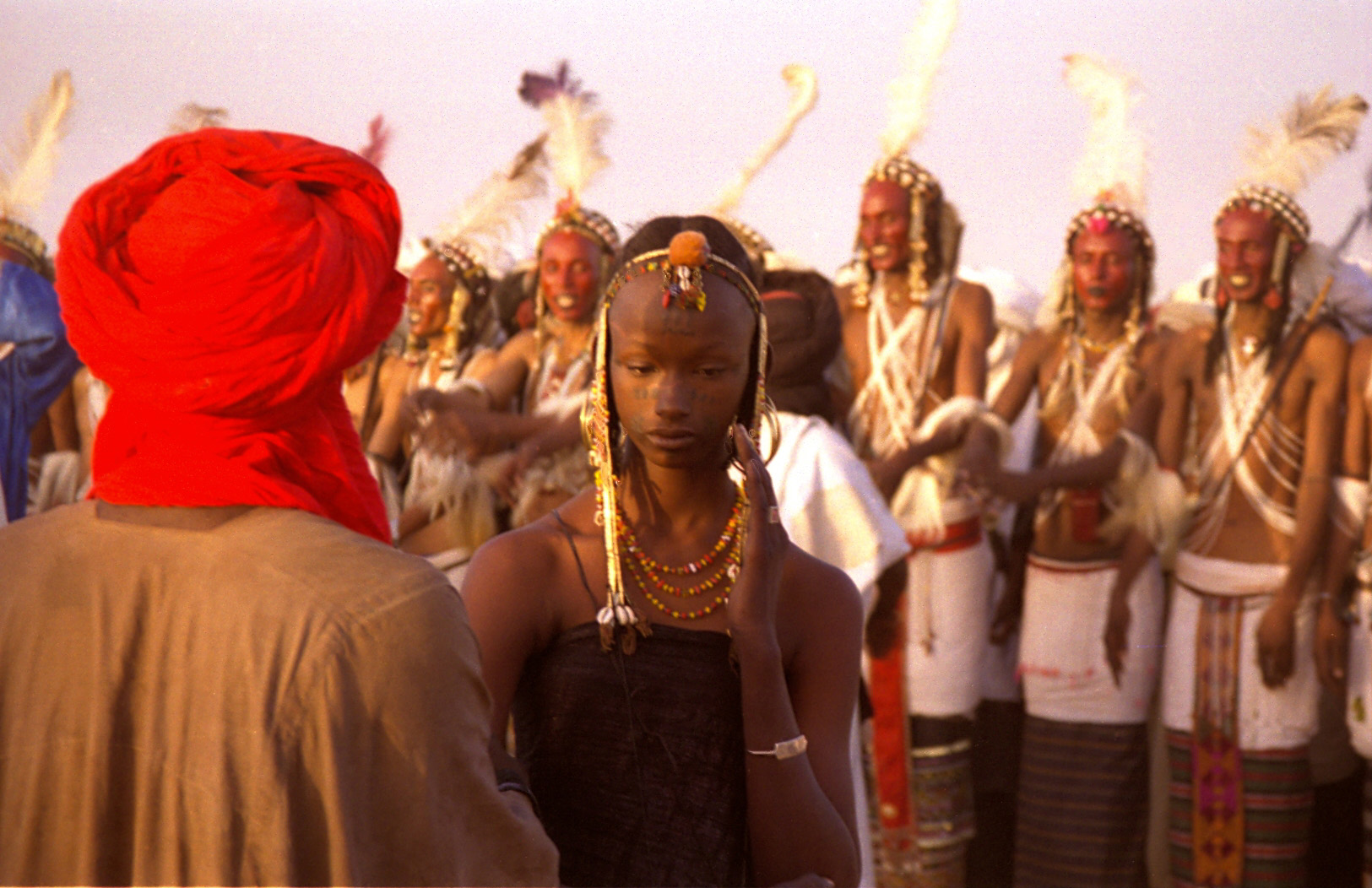
A young maiden judging the contestants in a Gerewol festival

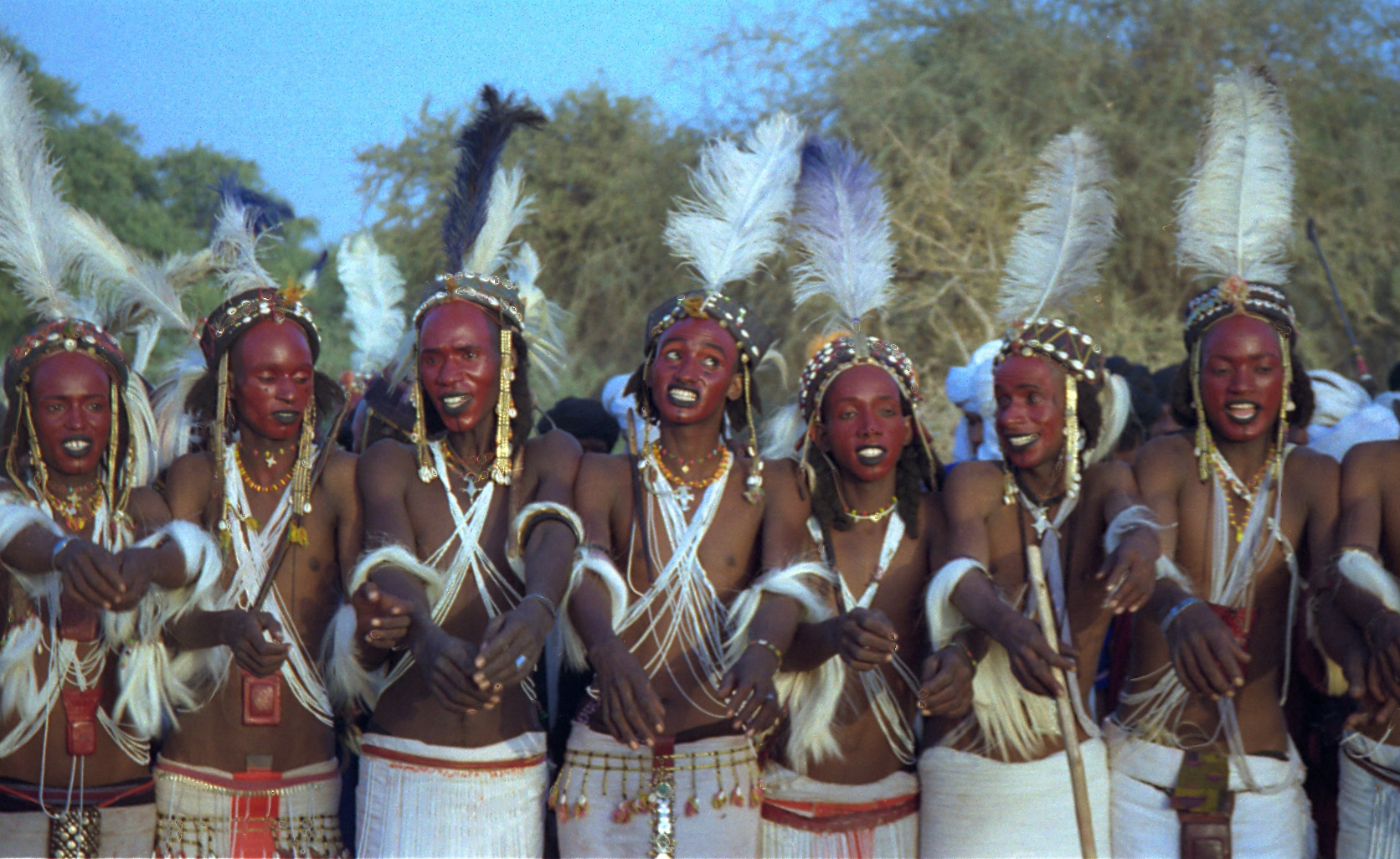
Young suitors perform the Yaake dance in a Gerewol festival, Niger 1997

== Beauty ideal and Gerewol festival ==
At the end of the rainy season in September, Wodaabe clans gather in several traditional locations before the beginning of their dry season transhumance migration. The best known of these is In-Gall's Cure Salée salt market and Tuareg seasonal festival. Here the young Wodaabe men, with elaborate make-up, feathers and other adornments, perform the Yaake: dances and songs to impress marriageable women. The male beauty ideal of the Wodaabe stresses tallness, white eyes and teeth; the men will often roll their eyes and show their teeth to emphasize these beautiful characteristics. Wodaabe clans then join for the remainder of the week-long Gerewol: a series of barters over marriage and contests where the young men's beauty and skills are judged by young women.

== Documentaries and popular culture ==
The documentary Wodaabe - Herdsmen of the Sun by Werner Herzog describes the Wodaabe.

In the 1999 documentary Zwischen 2 Welten (between two worlds) director Bettina Haasen films her personal conversations with Wodaabe members.

Sahara - Absolute Desert (2002) - a documentary with Michael Palin who follows a camel caravan of Wodaabe to Ingal in Niger for the annual Sahara Cure Salée festival, to an oasis at Tabelot, then across the Tenere Desert to the border of Algeria.

The 2010 ethnographic documentary Dance with the Wodaabes by Sandrine Loncke explores, from the point of view of its participants, the complex cultural significance of the spectacular but frequently misunderstood and sensationalized Wodaabe ritual celebrations known as "Geerewol".

The Niger-based band Etran Finatawa is composed of Wodaabe and Tuareg members and creates their unique style of "Nomad Blues" by combining modern arrangements and electric guitars with more traditional instruments and polyphonic Wodaabe singing. In 2005 they recorded an album and toured Europe.

"Wodaabe Dancer" is the name of an instrumental track on guitarist Jennifer Batten's 1997 album, Jennifer Batten's Tribal Rage: Momentum.

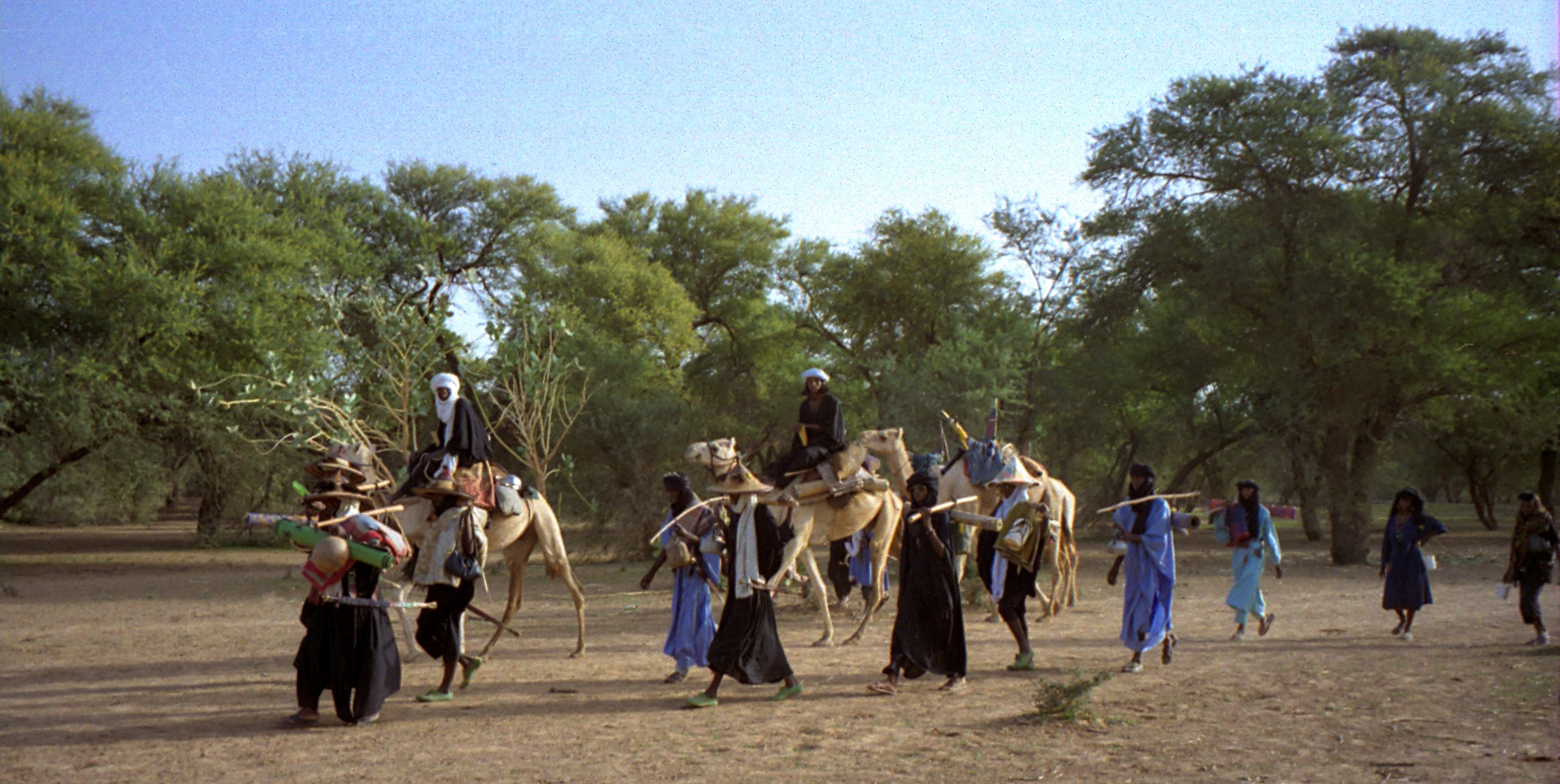
A group of traveling Wodaabe in Niger, 1997

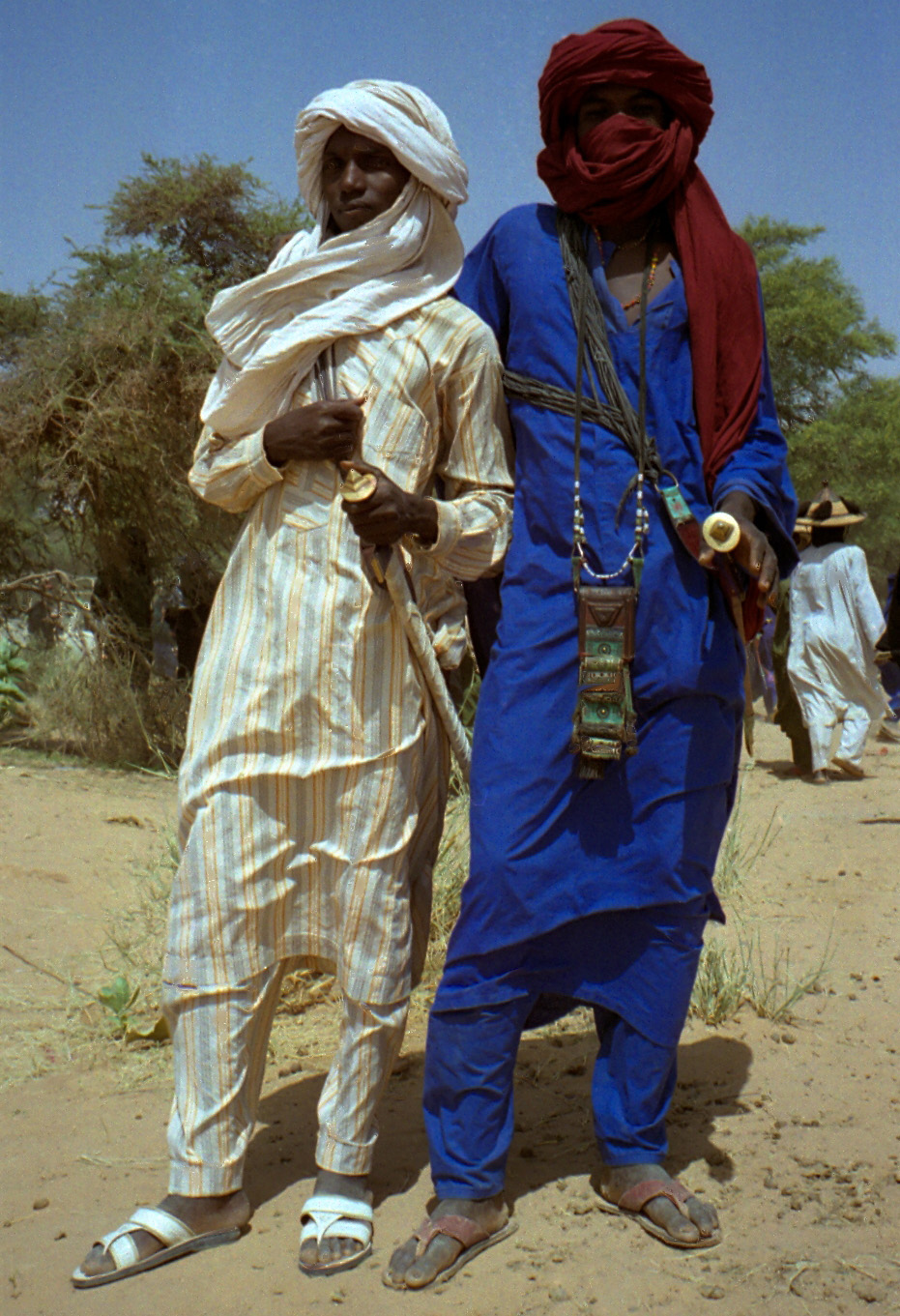
Two Wodaabe men

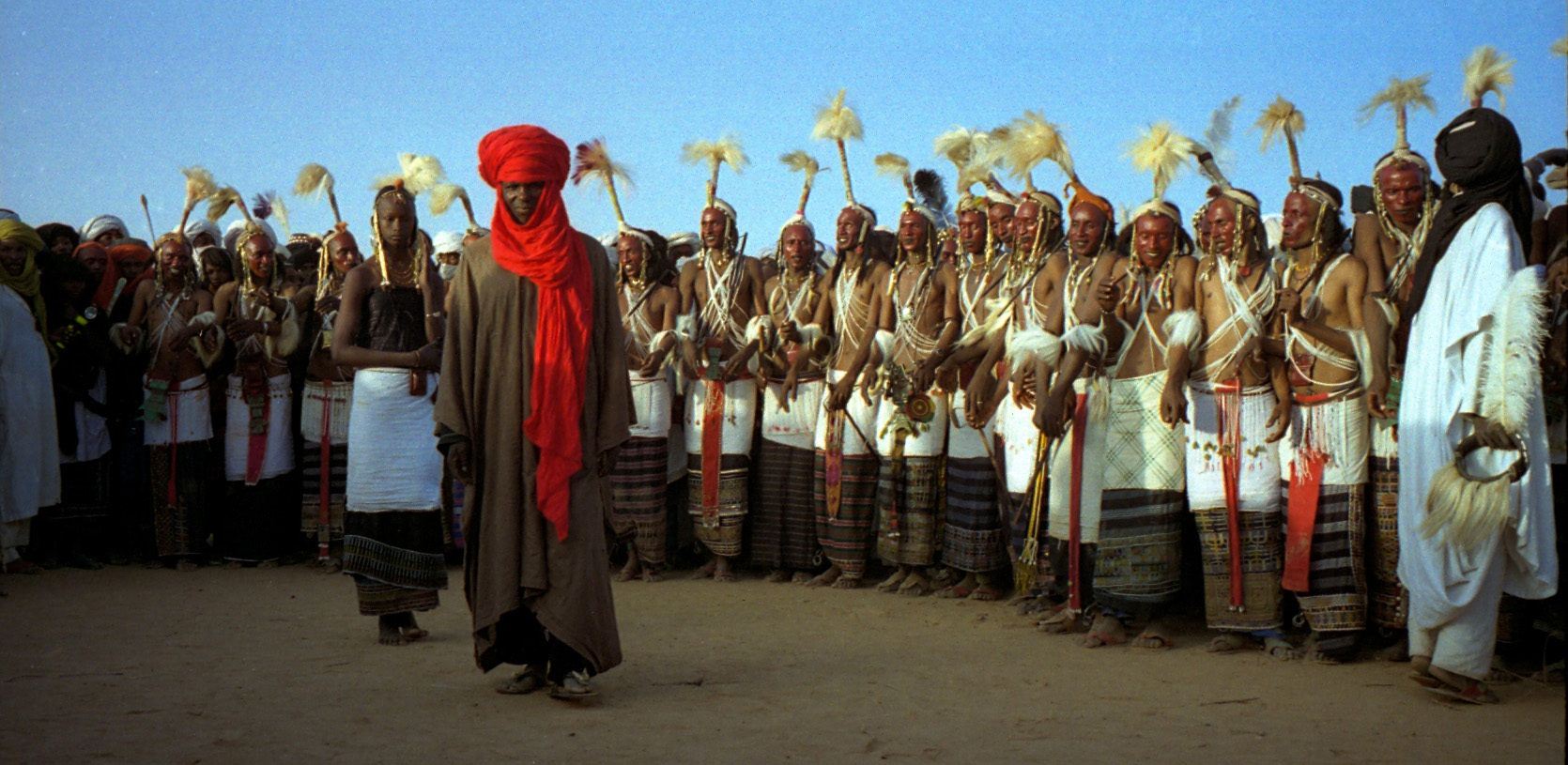
A young woman judging the beauty of men at a Gerewol

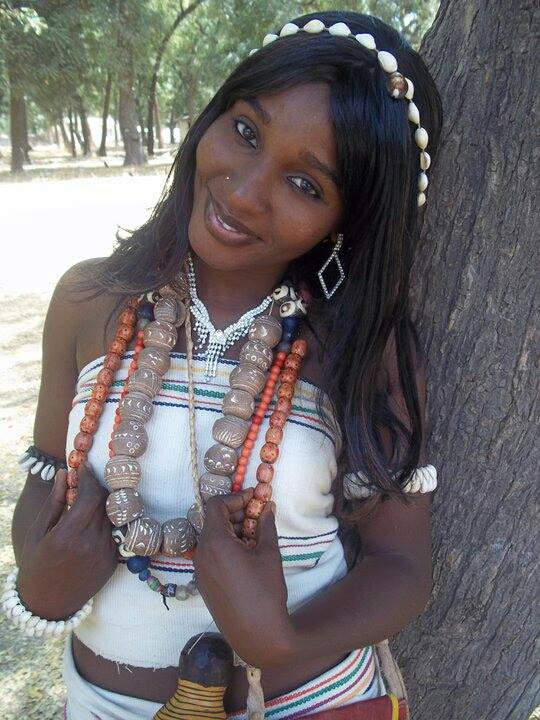
Woman from Cameroon

== Sources ==
- Beckwith, Carol. Nomads of Niger. Harry N. Abrams, Inc. 1993.
- Beckwith, Carol. Niger's Wodaabe: People of the Taboo Archived 4 March 2016 at the Wayback Machine, National Geographic, October 1983
- Bovin, Mette. Nomads who cultivate beauty: Wod̳aab̳e dances and visual arts in Niger. Nordic Africa Institute, 2001 ISBN 978-91-7106-467-7
- Loncke, Sandrine. Geerewol : Musique, danse et lien social chez les Peuls nomades wodaabe du Niger. Société d'ethnologie, 2015, 415 p. (with a DVD-ROM including annotated music recordings, short videos and the documentary feature La danse des Wodaabe) ISBN 9782365190091
- Loncke, Sandrine. Mémoire et transmission musicale dans une société nomade. L’exemple des Peuls Wodaabe du Niger, Cahiers d'ethnomusicologie 22, 2008, p. 203-222
