= Diffa Arabs =

Arab nomadic tribespeople living in Niger

Diffa Arabs (Arabic: عرب الديفا) (also known as Mahamid Arabs) is the Nigerien name given to a number of Arab nomadic tribes people living in eastern Niger, mostly in the Diffa Region.

In 2006, approximately 150,000 accounting for less than 1.5% of the Niger's population, the Diffa Arabs are said to be the westernmost dispersion of Arabic-speaking Sudanese nomads, primarily drawn from the Mahamid subclan of the Rizeigat of Sudan and Chad.

== Movement into Niger ==
The Nigerien Arab populations include groups drawn from the Shoa or Baggara Arabs, the first clans of whom are believed to have arrived in what is now Niger sometime in the 19th century. Small groups of the Ouled Slimane tribe, overrunning the Kanem Empire, filtered into the area between the late 19th century and 1923, joining with those Shoa pastoralists who were already centered in the Tintouma area.

In the 1950s, a small number of Kanem–Chadian Arabs moved into the area, but the population remained small. Later in the mid 1970s, there were only around 4000 nomadic Arabs in eastern Niger. But following the 1974 Sahelian Drought a much larger population of Arab clans began to move into Niger, followed by others fleeing the civil war and the Chadian-Libyan conflict in the 1980s, settling near Diffa.

The first President of Niger to be an ethnic Diffa Arab was Mohamed Bazoum, who was in office from 2021 to 2023.

== Tensions with neighbors ==
Many in the Diffa Arab community fought against the 1990s Tuareg rebellion, and in recent years, have come into increased conflict with Hausa, Kanuri, and some Tuareg communities. News reports quote Nigerien officials during the 2001 census reporting that Arab communities were in constant conflict with their neighbors over resources, were armed, and that "A relative unanimity prevails among the population who want them to leave the area".

== Diffa Arabs expulsions, 2006 ==
In October 2006, Niger announced that it would deport the Arabs living in the Diffa region of eastern Niger to Chad. This population numbered about 150,000. While the government was rounding up Arabs in preparation for the deportation, two girls died, reportedly after fleeing government forces, and three women suffered miscarriages. Niger's government eventually suspended the controversial decision to deport Arabs.

Arab Nigeriens protested that they were legal citizens of Niger, with no other home to return to, and that the military of Niger had seized their livestock, their only means of livelihood.

== Famous people ==
- Mohamed Bazoum

== See also ==
- Demographics of Niger
- Diffa Region
- Baggara Arabs
- 2023 Nigerien Crisis
- Mahamid
