= Russian intervention in Mali war =

Russia intervention in Mali War
- Part of Mali War, the War in the Sahel
- Military situation in Mali and neighboring countries as of 6 October 2026
| Date | 2022-ongoing |
| Location | Mali |
| Status | Ongoing |

Belligerents
| Russia: Africa Corps; Wagner Group (until 2025); Mali Alliance of Sahel States AES | Azawad Liberation Front(since 2024); Supported by: Ukraine(since 2024) CSP-PSD (2023-2024); CMA (until 2023); MNLA (until 2024); HCUA (until 2024); MAA (until 2024) | JNIM Katiba Macina: Islamic State; IS-SP |

Commanders and leaders
| Yevgeny Prigozhin X (Russia) Yunus-bek Yevkurov (Russia) Andrey Averyanov (WIA) (Russia) Vladimir Selivyorstov (Russia) Sergey Shecvhenko † (Mali) Assimi Goita (Mali) Abdoulaye Maiga; Sadio Camara X | Alghabass Ag Intalla (Azawad) Bilal Ag Acherif (Azawad) Hassan Ag Fagaga † (Azawad) Mohamed Ag Najem | Iyad Ag Ghali; Amadou Koufa Abu al-Bara' al-Sahrawi; Abu Huzeifa † |

Strength
| (Russia) 2,000+ (Mali) 40,000 (2022) | ~ 4,500 | ~10,000(2026) |

Casualties and losses
| (Russia) 200+ killed (2024–2026) (Mali) Unknown hundreds of vehicles destroyed | Unknown | Thousands (per Mali) |

Russian intervention in the Mali War – military activities of Russian personnel in Mali in support of the Malian junta during the ongoing armed conflict against Islamist insurgent groups and separatist movements. when the Malian transitional authorities established security cooperation with the Russian private military company Wagner Group.

== Backstory ==
In January 2012, following an influx of weapons that occurred after the Libyan Civil War, Tuareg tribesmen of the National Movement for the Liberation of Azawad (MNLA) began a rebellion against Mali's central government. In April, after 2 months of Tuareg rebellion the MNLA had accomplished its goals and called off its offensive against the government, proclaiming the independence of Azawad.

In June 2012, the MNLA came into conflict with the Islamist groups Ansar Dine and the Movement for Oneness and Jihad in West Africa (MOJWA), after the Islamists began imposing Sharia in Azawad By 17 July, islamist groups MOJWA and Ansar Dine had pushed the MNLA out of the most of major cities and even started offensive against Malian government. On 1 September 2012, the town of Douentza in the Mopti Region, until then controlled by the Ganda Iso militia, was taken by the MOJWA,.

The French military initially intervened in Mali in January 2013 as part of Operation Serval, which successfully regained the northern half of the country from Islamist groups. Operation Barkhane was intended to follow up on that success and expanded the French military's operations over a vast area of the Sahel region. The operation had the stated aim of helping the countries' governments to maintain control of their territory and preventing the region from becoming safe haven for Islamist groups.

== 2021 Malian coup ==
On 24 May 2021, the 2021 Malian coup d'état was carried out by Vice President Assimi Goïta. French President Emmanuel Macron announced in June 2021 that the operation would soon end and French forces would pull out in a phased manner, due to France's inability to work with the national governments in the Sahel region. France began withdrawing its troops from Mali on 17 February 2022.

In September 2021, the junta began negotiations to hire 1,000 mercenaries from the Russian-funded private military contractor Wagner Group, something France warned against. By the end of the year, hundreds of Wagner mercenaries began deploying across Mali, prompting strong objections from the international forces.

Following the announcement of a five-year transition timeline by the junta in January 2022, ECOWAS imposed sweeping sanctions against Mali. These were largely lifted in July 2022 after the junta revised the timeline to a two-year transition, with presidential elections set for February 2024. In September 2023, the election was postponed indefinitely and protests were banned.

== Intervention ==
Intensified Inter-Jihadist fighting over control of the north occurred between September 2022 and July 2023, before abating in August 2023. Throughout 2023, the transitional government consistently obstructed the CSP's efforts to activate the accord's international mediation framework, repeatedly rejecting Algerian offers to host dialogue sessions.

Jihadists took advantage of the resulting deadlock, and later vacuum created by the departure of international forces, expanding their control over vast rural areas of the north.

The first major conflict between the CSP-PSD and the Malian government began on August 6 at Ber. Malian and Russian forces stormed the town of Ber and its Minusma base, which was defended by CSP-PSD fighters. Following the capture of the town and its Minusma base, CSP-PSD officials threatened to recapture it. Amidst the withdrawals, CSP forces continued to attack Mali and Wagner troops, temporarily seizing several military camps and posts across the north and shooting down multiple aircraft, including Mali's only Sukhoi Su-25. On 9 September, JNIM also claimed responsibility for shooting down a Mi-8 helicopter operated by PMC Wagner; visual evidence published by the group confirms the helicopter's destruction.

=== Malian 2023-2024 offensive ===
The CSP-PSD began a series of raids against Malian and Wagner military bases throughout September; Bourem, Léré, Dioura, Bamba, and Taoussa were all pillaged between September 12 and October 3, and hundreds of Malian soldiers were killed. In response to the attacks, the Malian junta launched airstrikes on Kidal on October 2, killing at least two people.

On October 2, a Malian convoy left the town of Gao and headed north towards Kidal Region. The convoy was composed of 115 vehicles, six hundred Malian soldiers, and 150-200 Wagner mercenaries who were placed at the head of the convoy along with the 33rd Parachute Commando Regiment. On October 5, CSP-PSD rebels ambushed the malian convoy between Tabankort and Anefis, with both sides reported differing results. The CSP-PSD stated they stopped the convoy's advance, and that the Russo-Malian forces suffered heavy losses of manpower and equipment, including the taking of several POWs. The Malian army reported to have "broken the defensive curtain [of the rebels] with air and land actions". Once the convoy reached the CMA-controlled town of Anéfis, fighting broke out in the town. The Malian army claimed that the rebels suffered heavy losses, although the CSP-PSD stated eight fighters were injured and none were killed. The Malian Army seized control of Anefis on the morning of October 7.

On October 14, the CSP-PSD advanced and captured several abandoned MINUSMA posts near the Tessalit Airport. Two days later, the Malian and Wagner forces landed two cargo planes at the Tessalit Airport, sparking brief clashes with the rebels with no casualties. A Malian drone strike on October 17 killed one CSP-PSD rebel and injured two others. Between October 16 and 17, 300 Malian soldiers and 150 Wagner mercenaries were present in Tessalit.

Malian officials tried to slow down the departure process by only authorizing small quantities of MINUSMA flights, although the peacekeepers in Kidal had already evacuated by October 31. The CSP-PSD subsequently captured the camp in Kidal that same day.

Malian forces launched airstrikes on Kidal from Bayraktar TB2s beginning on the night of November 3–4, targeting the CSP-held MINUSMA camp. No casualties were reported following the airstrikes. Drone strikes started up again on November 7, with three bombs targeting the MINUSMA camp. One bomb hit the camp and two fell outside of it, with one of the ones tat missed instead hitting a school. CSP-PSD officials reported that fourteen civilians were killed in the bombing and thirty more were injured, including twenty-one children. Medical sources told RFI that at least ten civilians, including children, had been killed. A community leader, a business manager, a teacher, and a member of the Kidal Interim Authority were also among the dead.

Kidal was hit by Malian drone strikes again on November 10 to 11, but no one was injured or killed. That same day, the Russo-Malian convoy began moving towards Kidal again. In response, CSP-PSD fighters cut off cell signal to the city to prevent saboteurs from releasing information about the strategic locations to Malian forces.

Malian and Wagner forces seized control of Kidal bloodlessly on November 14. A night attack by Wagner mercenaries had infiltrated the city, and was decisive in allowing Malian and Wagner forces to capture the city. By 15 November 2023, junta and Wagner forces had captured Kidal following clashes prompted by the UN’s early withdrawal, using Turkish-made Bayraktar TB2 drone strikes to disrupt CSP defenses and force fighters to retreat without prolonged ground combat, although neither side was capable of securing a decisive victory, as the CSP remained entrenched in rural areas.

Malian president and junta leader Assimi Goïta stated that operations to capture all of Kidal Region would continue.

One of the CSP-PSD leader, Hassan Ag Fagaga was killed on the morning of December 22, 2023, in Tinzaouatine, by a drone strike by the Malian army. The Permanent Strategic Framework (CSP) announces his death on December 23.

On 9 February 2024, Wagner and Malian forces captured the Intahaka mine in Gao region. On 29 April, it was reported that Abu Huzeifa, a commander for a Sahelian affiliate of Islamic State (ISGS) was killed during an operation in Menaka region by Malian army.

== Escalation ==
After a few months without clashes, the Russian-Malian forces launched a new offensive in the summer of 2024. In the end of June, they reached village of Abeïbara, where at least 60 tuareg civilians were massacred.

On 20 July, a convoy of nearly 20 vehicles carrying FAMa soldiers and Wagner mercenaries engaged in a series of search operations in northern Mali, mainly looking for Tuareg rebels who held territory in the strongholds of Inafarak and Tinzaouten. By 23 July, Inafarak was captured by Malian forces and the convoy moved towards Boghassa. It was attacked by an improvised explosive device near the Tamassahart valley and one armoured personnel carrier was disabled, but the convoy continued and moved towards Tinzaouaten.

On 25 July at 14:50 GMT, Tuareg rebels ambushed the convoy while heading to Tinzaouaten, 12 miles (19 km) west of the commune. Ten Malian soldiers and five mercenaries were estimated to have died in the ambush, and a number of vehicles were disabled. A rescue helicopter was dispatched to evacuate the wounded. Russian and FAMa forces were forced into a low ground position with little natural barriers while Tuareg snipers were positioned on the high ground. Civilians in the commune evacuated.

The fighting resumes on July 27, near Zakak, on the road to Kidal. The fighting turned in favor of the rebels, and the CSP announced that «the enemy is in disarray» . A sandstorm then arose, working in favor of the Tuaregs. According to the Wagner Group, the rebels took advantage of this to regroup and launch a counter-attack with more than 1,000 fighters. The CSP also claimed responsibility for the destruction of a Malian helicopter. The Malian army, for its part, stated that a Mi-24 attack helicopter encountered «technical difficulties» which resulted in no casualties.

After three days of fighting, the Malian army announced that it had voluntarily withdrawn from the Tinzaouaten sector. However, the rebels pursued the Russian-Malian troops, and the fighting moved towards Abeïbara. At the end of the day, the CSP claimed a «resounding victory» and stated that its forces had definitively annihilated the enemy columns. The few survivors from the FAMA ranks and the Wagner militia were taken prisoner.

During the retreat, Malian soldiers and Russian mercenaries were ambushed by jihadists from the Group for the Support of Islam and Muslims (JNIM) in a valley in the Tin-Gamera mountains, 40 to 70 kilometers south of Tinzaouaten. The CSP, for its part, denied any involvement by JNIM. However, JNIM also released images of its participation in the fighting. The jihadist assault was led by Sedane Ag Hita , one of its senior commanders.

The Wagner Group confirmed that it suffered heavy losses during the fighting, but did not give an exact death toll. Mali also confirmed that it suffered "significant losses", without providing a number, and said that it was conducting an analysis to "learn all the necessary lessons». The far-right and neo-Nazi paramilitary Rusich Group, which has links to the Wagner Group, said on Telegram that 80 mercenaries were killed and about 15 were captured.

On 29 July, the Ukrainian Main Intelligence Directorate , headed by Kyrylo Budanov, claims to have provided assistance to the Azawad rebels in their fight against Wagner Group mercenaries. According to the Kyiv Post, Andriy Yusov stated that "the rebels received the necessary information, which enabled a successful military operation against Russian war criminals".

On 17 August, an attack by JNIM militants killed about 15 Malian soldiers. Malian soldiers also fired back causing unknown militant casualties in the Mopti region, near the town of Diallassagou. On 27 August, an alleged drone strike by the Malian army killed about 21 civilians in Tinzaouaten.

From 26 to 30 November, the members of the CSP held a meeting in their new stronghold of Tinzawatène, where they dissolved themselves and merged into the Azawad Liberation Front (FLA), officially returning to demands for the independence of Azawad. Hours later, the next morning, Mali launched several drone strikes on the town, killing eight members, including senior officials such as leader of GATIA.

=== JNIM attacks ===
On 17 September 2024, gunmen from a cell of Jama'at Nasr al-Islam wal-Muslimin (JNIM) attacked several locations across Bamako, the capital of Mali, including Malian Army and Wagner Group bases and Modibo Keita International Airport. JNIM fighters released videos destroying six aircraft, including two Casa C-295 of the Malian Air Force, and one video showing a militant setting fire to the engine of the presidential jet. About 100 Malian soldiers and policemen were killed and more than 255 others were injured. At least 10 Wagner militants were killed according to Malian military source.

In December 2024, the Russian MoD deployed 1,000 Africa Corps troops to Mali, where 1,500 Wagner mercenaries were still based under the command of Ruslan Sergeevich Zlobin. The corps thus became the only Russian force present in the country. Several Wagner leaders, however, moved over to the Africa Corps with some of their men, including Andrey "Kep" Ivanov, Ruslan "Rusich" Zaprudsky, and Alexander "Ratibor" Kuznetsov. Around 2,000 Russian troops remained in Mali.

On 23 May 2025, an attack by JNIM militants occurred in Dioura, where they temporarily took control of the nearby military base. During the attack, about 41 maliam soldier died. On 1 June 2025, JNIM militants attacked and took control of a Malian army base in Boulkessi. Around 30 Malian soldiers died before they retreated. 2 days later, the Malian Armed Forces launched airstrikes on terrorist positions in Diafarabé, Mopti Region and Niagassadou, Douentza Region, claiming to have caused heavy losses and disrupting terrorist plans.

On 5 June 2025, more than 50 JNIM militants attacked a military camp in Mahou, South Mali. On 6 June 2025, the Wagner Group announced that it was ending its deployment in Mali after «completing its mission» against insurgents in the country, claiming that it had killed thousands of militants and rebel commanders. In June 2025, a Su-24M bomber belonging to the corps went down in the Niger River near Gao, officially due to poor weather, though Tuareg separatists claimed it was shot down in combat. The two pilots survived.

On 12 June 2025, the Malian Armed Forces claimed to have killed high-ranking JNIM katiba Attaye Ag Boulkhey, during a reconnaissance mission in Idjardahanen, Mopti Region.

On June 13, 2025, FLA attacked Malian soldiers and their allies near Anoumalane, in rural Kidal Region.. The battle was the largest defeat for Malian and allied Russian forces since the battle of Tinzaouaten nearly one year earlier. The FLA said only ten vehicles managed to escape, and that 21 vehicles were destroyed and 15 were captured.

On 5 September 2025, JNIM announced a blockade around the cities of Kayes and Nioro du Sahel. Militants proceeded to set up checkpoints to extort "taxes" from drivers. Several people were also kidnapped during the blockade, as well as at least 40 fuel tankers being burned.

On 23 September 2025, two Emirati men and an Iranian man were kidnapped by JNIM. The men were taken from the private estate of Joumoua bin Maktoum al Maktoum, a retired general, in Sanankoroba, 40 km south of Bamako. The hostages were released on October 30th after the United Arab Emirates paid $50 million. On 8 November 2025, JNIM militants attacked the military base in Soumpi, killing 20, including the base commander. JNIM proceeded to loot the base before reinforcements arrived.

On 25 January 2026, JNIM ambushed FAMA and Africa Corps forces in Diabaly, capturing equipment and destroying a vehicle. On 7 February 2026, the Malian Army announced three successful airstrikes, killing 35 JNIM militants nearby the Niger River in the Ségou region.

On 9 March seven civilians were executed by Africa Corps near the border with Mauritania. On the same day, JNIM ambushed Malian and Russian Africa Corps forces in a village near Nampala, killing 10 soldiers, including three Russians as a retaliation. On 6 April 2026, JNIM kidnapped four Chinese nationals from a gold mine near Narena.

=== April Attacks ===
On 25 April 2026, FLA and JNIM carried out a major offensive with attacks directed at the Modibo Keïta International Airport, Kati, Gao, Bamako, and several locations in the country in a coordinated attack, according to the Malian army. Tuareg rebels from FLA took control of Kidal and shot down a russian helicopter near Gao. Malian minister of Defence, General Sadio Camara, was assassinated by JNIM militants in a suicide bombing in Kati.

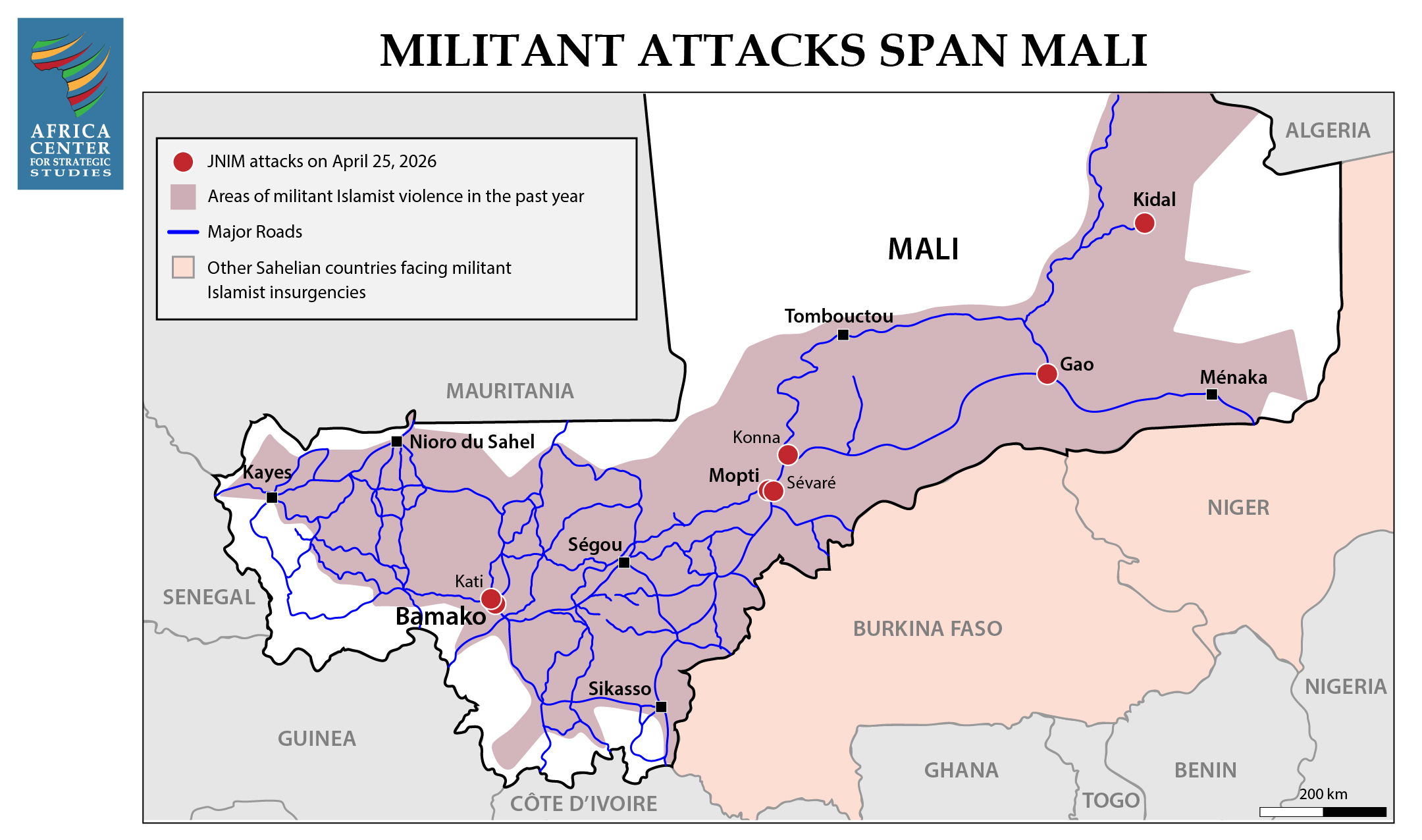
Map of attacks on 25 April

Kidal was fully under FLA control by the end of 25 April, although Malian and Russian soldiers remained entrenched in the former MINUSMA camp. Resistance continued on the outskirts of Kidal from Malian and Russian soldiers until the evening of 25 April, when they were evacuated to the MINUSMA base. The Africa Corps later confirmed its withdrawal from Kidal on 27 April. FLA stated the several dozen Malian soldiers were killed in clashes following Russian withdrawal. An additional about 200 malian soldiers were captured by FLA.

The FLA later announced that they reached a deal to allow the withdrawal of Russian Africa Corps forces from Kidal, granting the rebels full control of the area On 27 May, the army began a bombing campaign around Kidal, using drones and Su-24 aircraft, destroying a mosque and damaging several homes, including that of FLA President Bilal Ag Acherif.

Russia's Africa Corps said in a statement on 27 April that a coup attempt has been prevented, referring to it as a "Syrian scenario". The statement also claimed that strategic locations have been secured.

On 28 April, JNIM spokesman Bina Diarra announced in a Bambara-language video that JNIM would be blockading Bamako starting that day. On 30 April, JNIM claimed that it took control of two checkpoints outside of Bamako, and also that it captured the military camp near Hombori in central Mali, which the Africa Corps denied. On the same day it was reported that JNIM had set up its own checkpoints around the capital.

On 1 May, the FLA and JNIM took control of the military base outside of Tessalit in the Kidal Region, near the Algeria–Mali border, after Malian and Russian troops withdrew southward. On 6 May, JNIM attacked the Kenieroba Central Prison in southern Mali, which houses 2,500 inmates, including militants from the group, opposition politicians.

=== Battle on Anéfis ===
The FLA and JNIM renewed their offensives after almost a two-month break on 4 July. In the 5th, they took the majority of the town of Anéfis and its surroundings from Malian and Russian forces, with a relief convoy of hundred soldiers from Africa Corps being routed near Tabrichat and a Mi-24 being shot down. After the initial reinforcements were defeated, a second wave arrived and recaptured the town on 9 July.

On 17 July, FLA militants attacked a convoy returning from Anefis, killing 50 soldiers and taking 20 prisoners.

After the rout of the Malian army against the JNIM jihadists on 18 July on the city of Kouakourou, Kouakourou has been emptied of its inhabitants and occupied by JNIM jihadists.

On 26 July 2026, forces of the Russian Africa Corps, supported by the Malian army claim to have ambushed and eliminated at least 8 militants near the town of Niono. Footage of the ambush was released by the Africa Corps on telegram.

On August 6, JNIM attacked a government military camp in San. According to Mali, during the attack, 10 soldiers and 40 militants were killed. On August 9, militants from JNIM claims to have taken control of an Army barracks in San, Segou. Local sources reportedly, clashes ongoing few hours. At least 10 soldiers of Malian army were killed.

On 13 August, 82 Malian prisoners who were captured durning clashes in Kidal have been freed by FLA. Mohamed Elmaouloud Ramadane, a spokesperson for the FLA, said that the release was conducted for “strictly humanitarian” reasons.

On 10 September, JNIM fighters attacked the Malian Armed Forces camp at Dioura. Malian army used air power to counterattack, but as of September 14, camp remained under the control of militants. Both Russian and Malian forces suffered casualties.

== Casualties ==
=== Malian-Russian casualties ===
Mali frequently withholds information regarding casualties. The same applies to Russia. According to ACLED data cited by RFI, more than 200 Russian fighters were killed in Mali between July 2024 and August 2026.

The battle on Tinzaouaten was the deadliest battle for Russian troops in Mali. The Wagner Group confirmed that it suffered heavy losses during the fighting, but did not give an exact death toll. A former Wagner Group mercenary told BBC News Russian that at least 82 Russians died in the battle. On 2 August, CSP said that 84 Wagner mercenaries and 47 Malian soldiers were killed in the battle, while 30 other troops, either dead or seriously injured, were evacuated by aircraft to Kidal, while losing nine of its own men. In addition, it captured seven mercenaries and Malian soldiers.

According to the Telegram channel "Razgrouzka Wagnera" associated with the Wagner Group, the detachment was led by Sergei Shevchenko, known as " Proud", the commander of the group 's 13th Assault Detachment, who was killed in action. The Russian news agency TASS also announced that Nikita Fedianin, known as "Bely", administrator of the Telegram channel "Grey Zone" dedicated to Wagner's activities, was killed during the offensive.

Visually confirmed losses include at least six MRAPs (one OTT Puma M26, four Norinco CS/VP-11 and one Streitgroup Typhoon), one helicopter (Mi-24), and 14 trucks (nine Kia KM450, one Sinotruk Howo, one Sinotruk Howo Tanker, two Toyota Landcruiser 79 and one unknown vehicle).

Research group All Eyes on Wagner confirmed the deaths of 45 Russian and Malian soldiers durning the battle on Anoumalane on 13 June 2025 and destruction of 7–21 vehicles by FLA.

Two russian Mi-24 were also shot down by FLA during the 2026 offensive. On 26 August, JNIM carried out an attack near the village of Ber. They claimed to have killed around 26 soldiers of the African Corps and the Malian army. On 7 September, JNIM attacked the African Corps in central Mali, killing several Russian soldiers and releasing a video of the dead. A Russian Telegram channel linked to Wagner confirmed the casualties.

In the 10 September Dioura attack, 100 Malians and 5 Russians were killed. Dozens of soldiers were captured. JNIM captured six Toyota pickup trucks, ten motorcycles, more than two hundred Kalashnikov assault rifles, about fifty heavy machine guns, and a dozen rocket launchers.

=== Jihadist casualties ===
In 2025 Wagner claimed that they have killed thousands of terrorists. Africa Corps claimed that 10,000 to 12,000 JNIM and FLA fighters participated in the 2026 attacks. They alleged that over 1,000 insurgents were killed, including over 200 in Bamako, 500 in Gao, 300 in Kati, and 200 in Kidal, and that over 100 vehicles were destroyed. On 28 April, the Russian Ministry of Defence released footage of airstrikes carried out by Russian personnel, claiming that about 305 militants had been killed in recent strikes. On 2 May, Malian state TV reported that over 200 militants were killed in targeted airstrikes the prior morning; Xinhua News Agency reported that four weaponized trucks and 60 motorcycles were also destroyed.

== War crimes ==
=== Russian-Malian crimes ===
In April 2022, Human Rights Watch reported that Russian mercenaries, believed to be members of the Wagner Group, had committed atrocities against hundreds of civilians in Mali, alongside members of the Malian Armed Forces. According to the NGO, Armed Conflict Location and Event Data Project, as many as 456 civilians died in nine incidents involving Malian forces and Wagner fighters, between January and mid-April 2022. The largest single atrocity was committed by Russian and Malian forces in the Moura massacre, where around 300 civilian men were killed on 23 March 2022.

On 22 April 2022, three days after the French military handed over the Gossi military base to Malian forces, France claimed suspected Wagner Group PMCs buried a dozen bodies in a mass grave a few kilometres east of the base soon after the withdrawal, with the intent of blaming France. In November 2024, the United Kingdom sanctioned the Africa Corps along with the Espanola formation and 81st Special Forces Brigade. According to British foreign secretary David Lammy, the goal is to "counter illegal Russian activities, hinder the destabilisation of African countries and to interrupt supply for the Russian war effort in Ukraine.

On November 12, 2023, durning Kidal offensive, soldiers from the Malian Armed Forces and the Wagner Group killed over 70 tuareg civilians near the village of Tonka, Tombouctou Region. The CSP-PSD condemned the massacre and accused the Malian-Wagner forces of responsibility. The latter did not respond to the accusations.

=== Ethnic cleansing allegation ===
In June 2024, Malian and Wagner forces conducted an operation around Abeibara. Their convoys left the towns of Kidal and Tessalit, and settled in Imaswaqassen, a village four kilometers from Abeibara. Clashes broke out with the CSP-PSD in this area between June 21 and 22, and JNIM detonated nine IEDs near and on the Malian and Wagner forces. Malian and Wagner forces launched reprisal attacks on civilians, assuming they were harboring CSP-PSD or JNIM militants. These killings took place between June 20 and 29. The son of the chief of Abeibara stated that the Malian and Wagner forces killed old men and shepherds and looted everything valuable they owned. The massacres took place in a forty kilometer radius in the villages of Aghli, Emadjlal, Hidjous, Akomas, Ouzen, and several others. Photos began circulating online of bodies in the streets of the villages.

Tuareg civil rights organization Kal Akal dubbed the massacres in Abeïbara circle as an ethnic cleansing campaign against Tuaregs by Wagner and Malian forces.

=== The reverse effect of mass murder ===
In 2025, observers and refugees reported that JNIM's recruitment was bolstered by the war crimes carried out by state-backed militias, particularly their targeting of Fulani communities—a predominantly Muslim, semi-nomadic ethnic group spread across West Africa. Although initially rejected by many locals, JNIM gained support in areas where pro-government forces carried out widespread civilian killings. These attacks drove many disillusioned Fulani, including entire families, to join the group.

Despite Wagner ground offensives, and Malian army sweeps have killed hundreds of fighters, the group’s manpower has grown from an estimated 2,000 in 2017 to 4,000–6,000 by 2025, and about 10,000 by 2026 with a recruitment rate outpacing attrition.The junta’s scorched-earth tactics village burnings, collective punishment of fulani families have only deepened communal alienation, driving more people to terrorist arms.

=== JNIM war crimes ===
On 7 September 2023, about 154 civilians and fifteen Malian soldiers were killed when JNIM militants simultaneously attacked a Malian military camp at Bamba and the civilian boat Tombouctou on the Niger River near the village of Banikane, Gourma-Rharous.

=== ISGS war crimes ===
At least 48 tuareg civilians were killed on 18 October 2026, when Islamic State in the Sahel Province (ISSP) militants attacked the Idaksahak pastoralist community in Tagadayat, about 40 km south of Ménaka in northeastern Mali.
