= 2026 Dioura attack =

Jihadist attack in the Mali War

- Part of the 2026 offensives during the Mali War
Date	10 September 2026
Location	Dioura, Tenenkou Cercle, Mali

Belligerents
Mali; Russia	Jama'at Nasr al-Islam wal Muslimin

Units involved
Malian Armed Forces; Russian Ministry of Defence; Africa Corps	Jama'at Nasr al-Islam wal Muslimin

Casualties and losses
100-150 killed: 93 captured; 5+ killed	Unknown

On 10 September 2026, jihadists from Jama'at Nasr al-Islam wal Muslimin attacked a Malian military base at Dioura. More than 100 Malian Armed Forces soldiers and 5 Russian Africa Corps paramilitary were killed in the attack.

== Background ==
Dioura has been the site of several attacks by jihadist groups against Malian forces due to its location in the heart of the war-torn Tenenkou Cercle. The previous attack in 2023 was by Tuareg rebels against Malian and Russian forces, and killed nearly 100 soldiers. Since the spring of 2025, JNIM has intensified their attacks on Malian forces, leading to a string of deadly attacks.

== Attack ==
Diora is one of the largest military bases in the region. The first wave of militants attacked the base held by the Malian Armed Forces (FAM). At the same time, other militants arrived from the east, on motorcycles, or in heavily armed vehicles. They managed to capture the camp, one of the focal points of the central movement.

At least 50 Malian Armed Forces soldiers and 5 Russian Africa Corps paramilitary were killed in the attack. Unverified sourced cited by AFP claimed 60 to 80 killed soldiers as well as several dozen soldiers taken as prisoners by the militants.

A Malian security source said more than 100 Malian soldiers were killed in the attack. Another 80 soldiers were captured.

After the attack, JNIM claimed to have taken "total control" of the barracks at Dioura. The Malian Armed Forces claimed to have killed "several dozen" militants in a retaliation attack on JNIM. As a result of attack, JNIM captured Six Toyota pickup trucks, ten motorcycles, more than two hundred Kalashnikov assault rifles, some fifty heavy machine guns, a dozen rocket launchers.

== See also ==
- Raid on Dioura (2019)
- Raid on Dioura (2023)
- 2025 Dioura attack
