= 2015 Nampala raid =

Al-Qaeda siege in Mali

Nampala raid
- Part of the Mali War
| Date | January 5, 2015 |
| Location | Nampalari, Mali |
| Result | Jihadist victory |

Belligerents
| Mali; France (air support) | AQIM; Katiba Macina |

Units involved
| 100 | Unknown |

Casualties and losses
| 11 killed 9 injured 3 prisoners | 10 killed |

On January 5, 2015, militants from Katiba Macina and Al-Qaeda in the Islamic Maghreb (AQIM) overran Malian defenses and briefly captured the city of Nampalari, Mali.

== Prelude ==
Katiba Macina was formed in 2015 as an affiliate of the jihadist group Ansar Dine in central Mali's Mopti Region. The group first created bases in the Wagadou forest on the Malian-Mauritanian border, attacking locales in Ténenkou Cercle and Ségou Region.

== Raid ==
Between 4am and 6:15 am, the attackers arrived from the direction of the Wagadou forest on vehicles fitted with black flags and entered Nampala from the eastern side. The jihadists then turned south-east, heading towards the Malian military garrison in the town. Around a hundred Malian soldiers were present at the camp during the attack. Despite this, the jihadists were able to surprise the soldiers and entered the camp.

The Malian soldiers did not put up much resistance, and quickly fled the surprise attack. The jihadists quickly took control of the city, and installed their flags on administrative buildings in the few hours before they were evicted. The Malian army and French air force quickly deployed reinforcements to the area, and the jihadists fled the town by 11am. A fighter from AQIM told the Mauritanian news agency Alakhbar that they were withdrawing from the city, and taking three Malian prisoners with them. The jihadists retreated to the Wagadou forest. Malian forces regained control of Nampala that evening.

== Aftermath ==
The group responsible for the attack was not identified during the attack. Alakhbar stated they were in contact with a fighter in AQIM that participated in the raid. Katiba Macina, an affiliate of Ansar Dine, claimed involvement in the attack a few months later.

The mayor of the nearby town of Diabaly stated that seven bodies clad in military uniforms were discovered in Nampala by the evening. An AFP source within MINUSMA stated eight people were killed in the attack. A Mauritanian truck driver corroborated these numbers, claiming to have seen seven bodies and one soldier dying. Four Malian soldiers were injured and admitted to the hospital in Ségou. On January 7, AFP confirmed eleven soldiers were killed and nine were injured.

On February 7, eleven armed men suspected of being involved in the raid on Nampala and the raid on Ténenkou were arrested northeast of Diabaly. A November 2018 report by the International Federation for Human Rights and the Malian Association of Human Rights stated that ten jihadists were killed in the raid.
