= Kadial =

Former commune and locality in Mali

Coordinates: 14°39′06″N 4°26′13″W

Kadial (sometimes spelled Kadiel) is a former commune and locality in the rural commune of Togoro Kotia, in the Ténenkou Cercle and the Mopti Region of Mali.

== Geography ==
Kadial is located thirty kilometers northwest of Mopti in a floodplain of the Inner Niger Delta. The territory is occupied by wet meadows with ponds with floating islands of bourgou and wet forests.

== Facilities ==
The former commune, including Kadial and four villages (Kada Kadial I to IV), remains a local center with a school and a community health center (CESCOM).

== Mali War ==
During the Mali War, Kadial experienced some terrorist activities. On the road from Mopti to Kadial, armed terrorists acted as road controllers. Since before 2017, jihadist brigades have been operating in the Kadial forest. On 29 April 2017, a vehicle of the Malian Armed Forces hit an improvised explosive device, followed by gunfire, near Kadial. On 17 May 2017, two teachers were kidnapped by the Katiba Macina, but were later released. That same year, a human resources staff member and two medical staff members were kidnapped by terrorists in Kadial. On 8 May 2018, Makan Doumbia, prefect of Ténenkou, was kidnapped in the Kadial forest but was released on 17 February 2019. On 9 June 2018, a team of the Malian Armed Forces tasked with retrieving nine civilian vehicles from the World Food Programme, which had been taken by terrorists on 6 June, encountered an ambush involving an improvised explosive device, followed by gunfire in Kadial. Two soldiers were killed and a vehicle loaded with weapons was taken by the terrorists.
