= Sévaré ambush =

- Part of Mali War
Date	May 29, 2016
Location	Between Sévaré and Ténenkou, Mali
Result	Katiba Macina victory

Belligerents
MINUSMA: Togo	Katiba Macina

Casualties and losses
5 killed 1 injured	None

On May 29, 2016, Katiba Macina militants ambushed Togolese peacekeepers in MINUSMA near Sévaré, Mali. The attack was the first deadly attack against UN peacekeepers in Mopti Region during the Mali War, and the first major engagement involving Togolese peacekeepers during the war.

== Background ==
Katiba Macina formed in 2015 as Mopti Region's affiliate of Malian jihadist group Ansar Dine, that rebelled against the Malian government in the early years of the Mali War. Prior to the attack, MINUSMA peacekeepers were conducting patrols around Mopti, which had recently seen deadly civil conflicts between herders and farmers.

== Ambush ==
Around 11 am, a convoy from the 4th Infantry Regiment of the Togolese Army was ambushed around thirty kilometers west of Sévaré, on the road leading to Ténenkou. A UR-416 armored personnel carrier hit a mine on the road, killing four soldiers, along with a fifth who died during evacuation efforts.

== Aftermath ==
Five Togolese peacekeepers were killed during the attack, and one other was injured according to MINUSMA. Among the dead were an adjutant, two sergeants, and two first-class privates. The attack marked the first deaths of peacekeepers in the Mopti Region during the war in Mali. While the attack wasn't claimed, Katiba Macina was suspected.
