= 2025 Timbuktu attack =

Jihadist attack in Mali

- Part of Mali War
Date	June 2, 2025
Location	Timbuktu Airport and checkpoints on the outskirts of the city, Timbuktu, Mali
Result	Indecisive: Timbuktu Airport attack foiled; Several checkpoints captured

Belligerents
Malian Army; Wagner Group	Jama'at Nasr al-Islam wal Muslimin

Casualties and losses
30-60+ killed	6-14 killed
- 1 person lynched

On June 2, 2025, jihadists from Jama'at Nasr al-Islam wal-Muslimin attacked various military sites in Timbuktu, Mali, killing several dozen Malian soldiers but ultimately failing to seize any sites long-term.

== Background ==
Since the spring of 2025, JNIM has intensified their attacks on Malian forces, leading to a string of deadly attacks. A week prior to the attack in Timbuktu, JNIM killed forty Malian soldiers in Dioura, and several military bases across the border in Burkina Faso were attacked by the militant group. Less than a day before the Timbuktu attack, the Malian military base in Boulikessi was overrun.

== Attack ==
At around 10am on June 2, several sites in the city of Timbuktu were attacked by JNIM. The Timbuktu Airport, which hosts a major Malian and Wagner Group military base, was a primary target of the attacks. A suicide bomber drove a car bomb near the entrance, with its explosion allowing JNIM militants to enter the airport. The Russian base was hit by artillery fire, but no casualties were reported. Three explosions near checkpoints to the north and east of the city in Assadi, Ber, and Arwen were caused by JNIM attacks, with the group seizing two checkpoints. Images of slain soldiers' IDs and weapons were posted onto social media.

After the attack, the Malian government congratulated itself on having "thwarted an infiltration attempt" on the camp, while JNIM claimed to have carried out a suicide operation.

== Aftermath ==
The Malian army stated that fourteen jihadists were killed or injured, and 31 more were arrested. According to Sahel expert Wassim Nasr, six jihadists were killed. Images of the jihadists' bodies and captured vehicles were broadcast on Malian television. One person was also lynched by residents of the city. JNIM claimed responsibility for the attack and stated that dozens of Malian soldiers were killed or wounded. Neither group mentioned their own losses.

AFP reported that at least 30 Malian soldiers were killed and several more were missing following the attack, with a local elected official saying at least 60 were killed.
