= Kora, Mali =

Kora
- Village
- Location in Mali
- Coordinates: 14°32′2″N 4°53′8″W
- Country: Mali
- Region: Mopti Region
- Cercle: Ténenkou Cercle
- Commune: Sougoulbé
- Time zone: UTC+0 (GMT)

Kora is a village and seat of the commune of Sougoulbé in the Cercle of Ténenkou in the Mopti Region of southern-central Mali. The village lies 10 km north-northeast of Ténenkou.
