= Raid on Dioura =

Raid on Dioura may refer to:

- Raid on Dioura (2019)
- Raid on Dioura (2023)
