= Ténenkou raid =

Raid on Ténenkou
- Part of Mali War
Date	January 16, 2015
Location	Ténenkou, Ténenkou Cercle, Mali
Result	Malian victory

Belligerents
Mali	Katiba Macina (suspected)

Casualties and losses
3 killed 5 injured	6+ killed (per Mali); Unknown number of prisoners (per Mali)
- 1 civilian killed

The raid on Ténenkou took place on January 16, 2015, between Malian forces and jihadists of the Ansar Dine-affiliated Katiba Macina.

== Background ==
Katiba Macina was formed in 2015 as an affiliate of the jihadist group Ansar Dine in central Mali's Mopti Region. The group's first location of activity was Ténenkou Cercle, as they had bases in the Wagadou forest on the Malian-Mauritanian border. Katiba Macina launched an incursion into Tenenkou Cercle on January 8, shooting sporadically, but did not succeed. They then launched attacks in Nampala and Dioura, which had tangible success.

== Raid ==
On the evening of January 14, jihadists infiltrated the town of Ténenkou in small groups. A small reinforcement arrived in the town on January 16, at which point the jihadists conducted a surprise attack on the Malian garrison stationed in the village. Clashes began that morning against a Malian army checkpoint, beginning around 6am and ending around 11am. The militants were repulsed, and forced to flee towards a nearby village. RFI initially presumed the attackers to be MOJWA. Katiba Macina was also suspected to be behind the attacks.

== Aftermath ==
The Malian Ministry of Defense released a statement announcing deaths on both sides, but no numbers. Anonymous officials within the Malian government, speaking to French media, stated at least two Malian soldiers were killed in the attack along with six fighters. The Malian sources also claimed to have taken prisoners. Chinese state media Xinhua, citing medical reports, stated three Malian soldiers were killed and five were injured, and one civilian was killed in the crossfire. The United Nations corroborated these numbers in their March 2015 report.

On February 6, 2015, Malian forces captured eleven suspected jihadists who participated in the Nampala and Tenenkou attacks.

In May 2015, clashes broke out in Ténenkou between the Malian army and Coordination of Azawad Movements, leaving at least ten rebels killed.
