= Kafolo attack =

2020 battle

- Part of Islamist insurgency in the Sahel
Date	June 10, 2020
Location	Kafolo, Côte d'Ivoire
Result	JNIM victory

Belligerents
Côte d'Ivoire	JNIM: Katiba Macina

Commanders and leaders
Unknown	Sidibe Ali

Casualties and losses
14 killed 6 wounded	1 killed

On June 10, 2020, jihadists from Jama'at Nasr al-Islam wal-Muslimin (JNIM) attacked the Ivorian border town of Kafolo, killing fourteen soldiers. This was the second attack by jihadists in Ivorian history, and the first since the Grand-Bassam shootings in 2016.

== Background ==
While Burkina Faso, Mali, and Niger have been embroiled in a jihadist insurgency by Jama'at Nasr al-Islam wal-Muslimin and the Islamic State in the Greater Sahara since 2012, the coastal West African state of Ivory Coast has not seen much activity by these groups. In 2016, militants from Al-Qaeda in the Islamic Maghreb, a predecessor to JNIM, killed nearly 20 people in Grand-Bassam, forcing the Ivorian government to crack down on jihadism.

Between May 11 and 24, 2020, Ivorian and Burkinabe soldiers conducted a joint operation dubbed Operation Comoe to weed out jihadists along the Ivorian-Burkinabe border. The operation resulted in the destruction of a jihadist base in Alidougou, on the Burkinabe side of the border, killing eight jihadists and arresting 38 others.

== Attack ==
Three commandos from Burkina Faso swam across the Komoé River before attacking a joint police and gendarmerie base in Kafolo, an Ivorian border town not far from Alidougou. The fighters then retreated to their bases in Burkina Faso. The three leaders of the JNIM cell are Sidibe Ali, nom de guerre Sofiane, Sidibe Drissa, and Abou Adama. Later sources reported that the cell's leader was Saidou Sekou.

While no group claimed responsibility for the attack, JNIM's Katiba Macina is suspected to be behind the attack. One of the planners of the attack, Sidibe Abdoul Rasmane Abdramani, is a close confidant of Katiba Macina founder Amadou Koufa and was sent by Koufa to establish a JNIM cell in Cote d'Ivoire.

== Aftermath ==
An initial report by the Burkinabe general staff on June 11 reported at least ten Ivorian soldiers killed, six injured, and one JNIM fighter killed. An Ivorian source speaking to AFP reported a dozen victims and one jihadist dead. A second Ivorian source reported eleven soldiers and one gendarme dead, six wounded, and two missing. RFI reported twelve soldiers and gendarmes killed, seven wounded, and two missing. In 2023, International Crisis Group reported that fourteen soldiers had been killed.

In the weeks following the attack, an Ivorian counter-operation arrested Sidibe Ali and thirty suspected jihadists. Two more attacks were launched against Kafolo on March 29, 2021, killing two soldiers, a civilian, and wounding five others. Further east, a gendarme was killed in another jihadist attack around that timeframe in the village of Kolobougou. Both attacks were planned by Saidou Sekou.

The Ivorian government took a much more proactive stance to countering jihadist threats after the Kafolo attack, with International Crisis Group saying "The Kafolo attack was instrumental in leading the Ivorian government to up its game." President Alassane Ouattara put forward a combined military and socio-economic strategy that deterred jihadists, and put more bases along the northern border.
