= Toguéré Coumbé =

- Commune and village
- Location in Mali
- Coordinates: 14°55′5″N 4°35′36″W
- Country: Mali
- Region: Mopti Region
- Cercle: Ténenkou Cercle

Area
  - Total: 1,448 km^{2} (559 sq mi)

Population (2009 census)
  - Total: 27,057
  - Density: 18.69/km^{2} (48.40/sq mi)
- Time zone: UTC+0 (GMT)

Toguéré Coumbé is a village and commune of the Cercle of Ténenkou in the Mopti Region of Mali. The commune contains 32 villages and in 2009 had a population of 27,057.

The village is 75 km northeast of Ténenkou and 80 km northwest of Mopti, near the right bank of the Diaka Channel, a distributary of the Niger River that only fills when the Niger is in flood. The commune occupies part of the Inner Niger Delta and from July to December much of the commune is under water and many villages are only accessible by boat.

The market that is held in the village on Saturdays serves many settlements in the surrounding region.
