= Dia, Mali =

Dia
- Town
- Location in Mali
- Coordinates: 14°21′7″N 4°57′25″W
- Country: Mali
- Region: Mopti Region
- Cercle: Ténenkou Cercle
- Commune: Diaka
- Time zone: UTC+0 (GMT)

Dia (Jà) is a small town and seat of the commune of Diaka in the Cercle of Ténenkou in the Mopti Region of southern-central Mali. It is situated at the western edge of the Inland Niger Delta floodplain, and is watered by the Diaka, one of the Niger River's major distributaries and the only permanent watercourse in the region.

Tigemaxo and also some Fulfulde are spoken in Dia.

The three-settlement mound complex of Dia, located at the western edge of the Inland Niger Delta of Mali, is known for rich oral and written resources, and predates the much better-known cities of nearby Djenne and Timbuktu. According to Levtzion, the Diakhanke "remember Dia in Massina as the town of their ancestor, Suware, a great marabout, and a saint." This vast site thus offers the possibility of studying the beginning of urbanization in this part of Africa and the structure of an early West African city.

Favorable climate and water supply have favored human settlement for centuries, and the history of the region is linked to that of former western Sudan with the successive empires of Ghana, Mali and Songhay. The water system provided a favorable route for trade between the southern and northern Sahara, making Dia as one of the key trade sites in the region.

== Geography and excavation ==
Since 1980, efforts have been made to make an inventory of the archaeological sites in the Inland Niger Delta to better understand their size and preservation. One of them was the large-scale excavations initiated by Rijksmuseum voor Volkenkunde at Leiden, within the framework of a long-term Malian-Dutch cultural heritage program. The initial prospection was carried out in 1998 in the Inland Delta, and the vicinity of Dia was chosen as the principal research zone for the project.

The settlement complex at Dia consists of an agglomeration of three separate large archaeological sites: Dia-Shoma, Dia, and Dia-Mara. With an area of 49ha, Dia-Shoma is the largest and oldest, dating back to the 9th century BCE. It is the only one of the three that was permanently abandoned. Dia, measuring 23ha, is still occupied today, while Dia-Mara, measuring 28ha, has been largely abandoned but is still partly in use as a burial site. These sites dates to the sixth century BCE and the height of settlement at this complex reached around the 10th century CE . Meanwhile, occupation does not begin until the sixth-century CE at the neighboring mound of Dia-Mara.

The only attempt at a detailed geomorphological study of the Dia was the one by Haskell et al. (1988), which resulted from an explorative field season consisting of text excavations at Shoma and Mara, and the survey of Dia's hinterland. The survey discovered Dia and its hinterland which are extensively cultivated with rice during the annual Niger flood. Also, some 37 further sites have been identified by Haskell et al., which is in a 5 km radius around the principal settlement mounds.

== Material artifacts ==
=== Spindle whorls ===
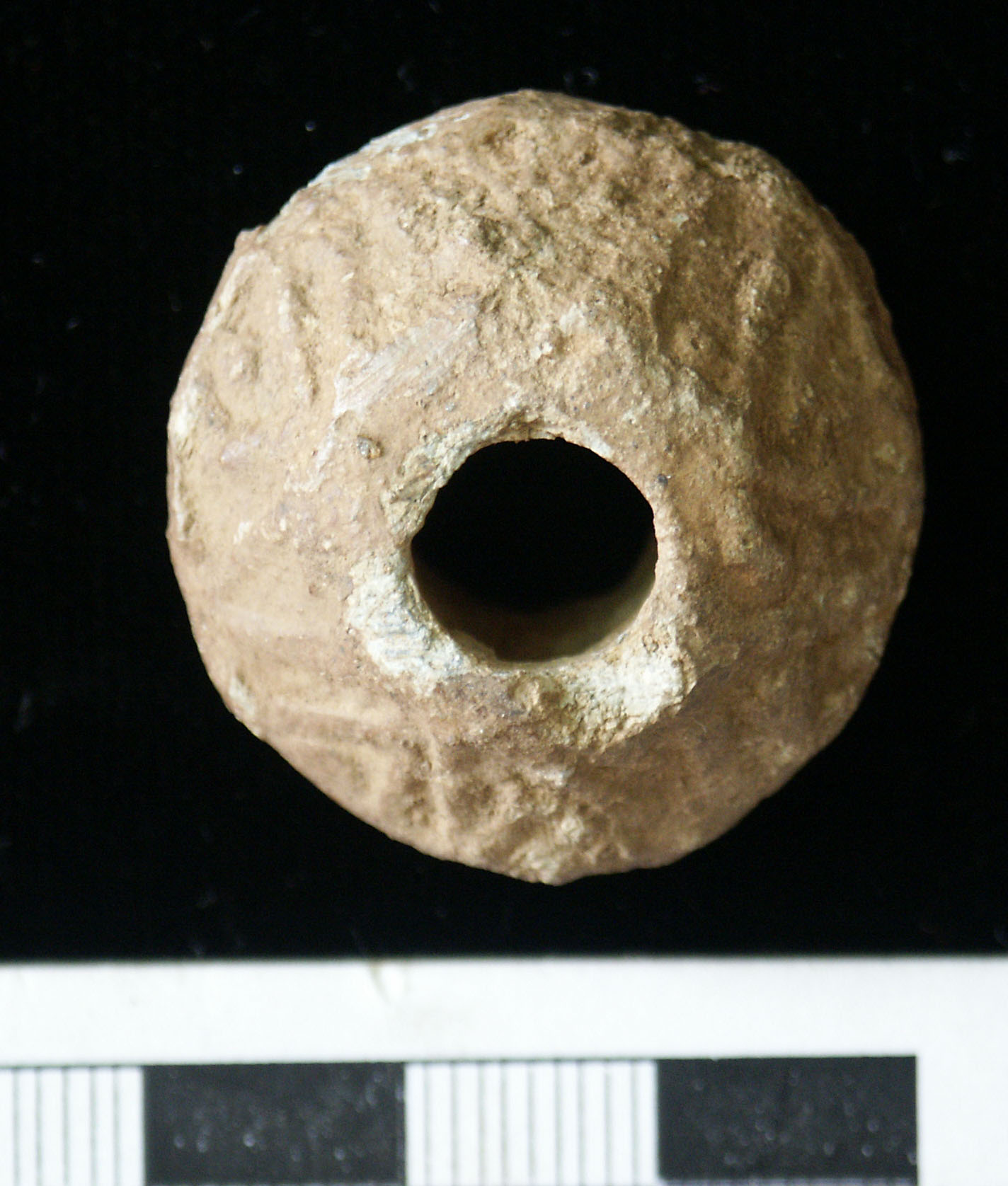
Medieval lead spindle whorl

The spindle whorls, which is an object used to spin both wool and cotton threads, have been identified in Shoma and Mara in a variety of contexts. A wide variety of shapes and sizes are observed among them, and most of them are elaborately decorated with incised lines, triangles, circles, and dots. They are common black terracotta types found in many regions of West Africa.

The presence of the spindle whorls indicate a local weaving tradition and may serve as evidence for string or yarn production. Indeed, the identification of cotton seeds and seed fragments indicates that cotton was grown locally, and several Islamic chronicles state that in the Sahel, thriving markets existed for cotton cloth and the cloth was considered a principal commodity of trade. However, there is no archaeological evidence of cotton cloth manufacture at Dia, as weaving materials such as looms and other equipment were not discovered.

=== Glass beads ===
Glass beads found in the region show a variety of shapes and are either black or bluff-colored with smooth undecorated surfaces. They have been discovered in small numbers in deposits of all sites in Dia, but they seem to occur in much larger quantities at Shoma as seven clay beads have been recorded from one unit.

The stone materials of the beads may also indicate the long-distance trade that happened at Dia. The stone material includes monochrome glass, red carnelian, and quartz. One of the monochrome glass beads found in the region has been identified as a folded glass bead, which is usually known from the Middle East. These beads have been correlated with the Islamic world in North Africa and the near East, which had a prospering bead production between the 7th to 14th centuries.

Furthermore, red carnelian beads are also used as evidence of long-distance trade connections. Archaeologists suggest the possibility of the import of these beads from Egypt, which is the most cited source for carnelian in Africa. Some point out India as a source, which was another major supplier of red carnelian beads.

Glass beads thus provide evidence that a trans-Saharan trade already existed as early as the beginning of the first millennium CE, and that Dia was involved in this trade. Dia seems to have participated not only in inter-regional trade but also in long-distance trade with places as far away as Egypt or maybe even India.

=== Pottery ===
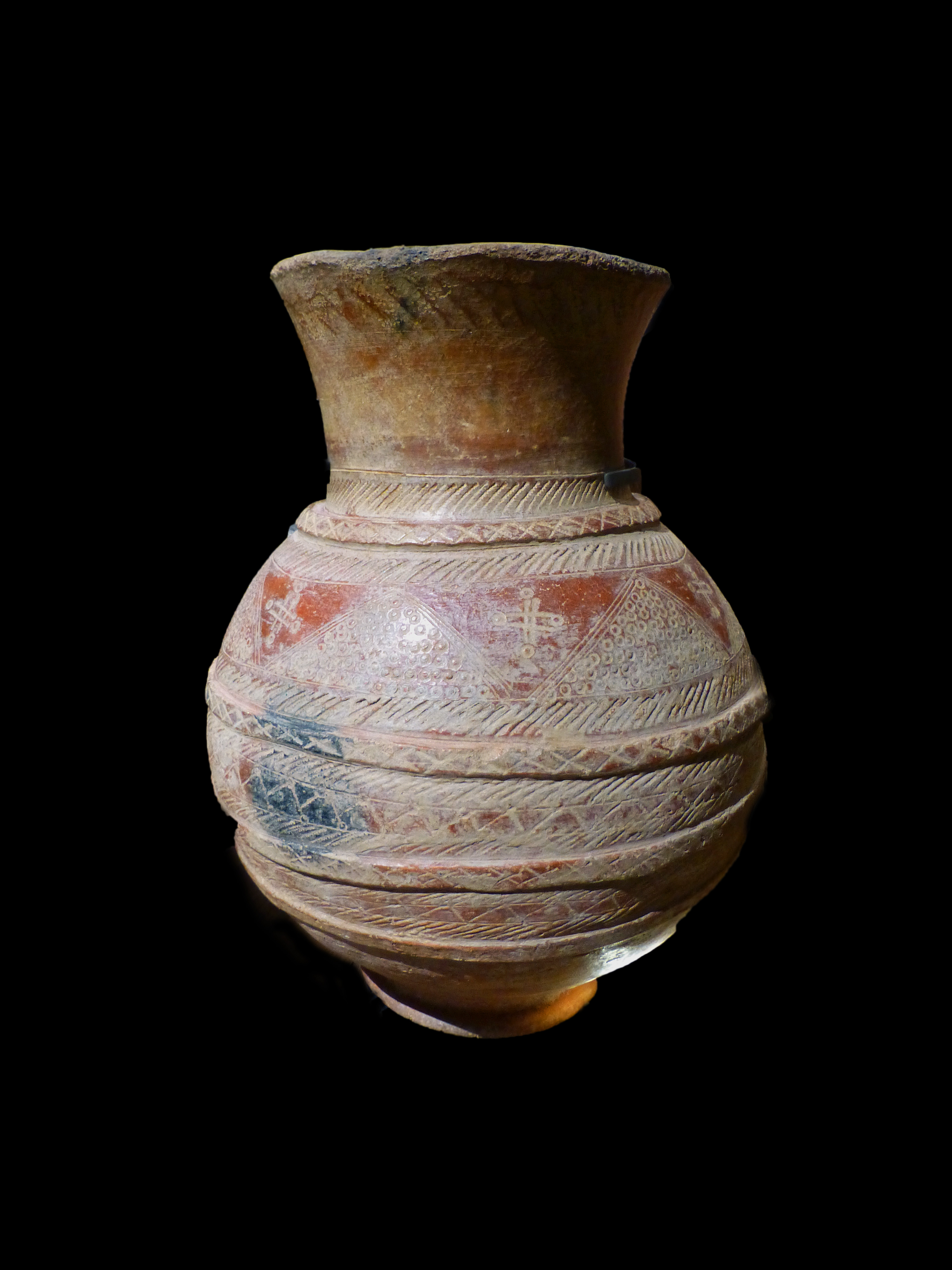
Jarre Bozo-Somono-Musée des Confluences

In the Inland Niger Delta of Mali, it has been shown that all the different ethnic groups had their distinctive ceramic traditions, which are characterized by their vessel-shaping techniques and decorative styles. Among the Mande-speaking peoples of West Africa, potters belong to a major professional class of artisans. Known as nyamakalaw, they have been distinguished from the class of former nobility and from that of slaves. Also in Dia, potters usually belonged to the blacksmith caste of the Somono, and they generally used a combination of a concave mold with a coiling technique in the initial phase of construction.

It has been suggested that Shoma and Mara's occupation and pottery assemblages are synonymous with that of Djenné-Djenno. The ceramic assemblages from Djenne-Jeno and Dia both consist of similar rim shapes and the application of red slip and were used as evidence that confirms some kinds of affinities between people in Dia and Djenne-Jeno. However, recent studies make a different argument, saying although similar in shapes, ceramics discovered in the two regions exhibit different decoration styles. Also, some types of vessels are widely discovered in one region but not in the other. For example, Djenné-Djenno's burial jars or funerary urns are completely absent at Dia Shoma and Mara, which provides evidence for different funerary practices, probably indicating the presence of different population groups. At Shoma, a total of 86 inhumations was identified, which suggests that sampling is not the cause for the seeming absence of funerary urns at Dia.

== Demographics ==
Dia's occupational history is characterized by the usurpation of local power by a series of incoming groups; which includes Bozo (Somono), Marka (Soninke), and the Peulh (Fulani). This may due to the highly irregular nature of Middle Niger's annual rainfall and flood, and thus each population group developed highly adaptable exploitation habits. The climate of the region has not only resulted in the collapse of the consistent cultural systems but had also led to cultural richness and various ancient towns.

The region's population groups have mainly been identified by their specialized economies such as the Bozo and Somono fisherfolk, Soninke rice cultivators and traders, and Peulh pastoralists.

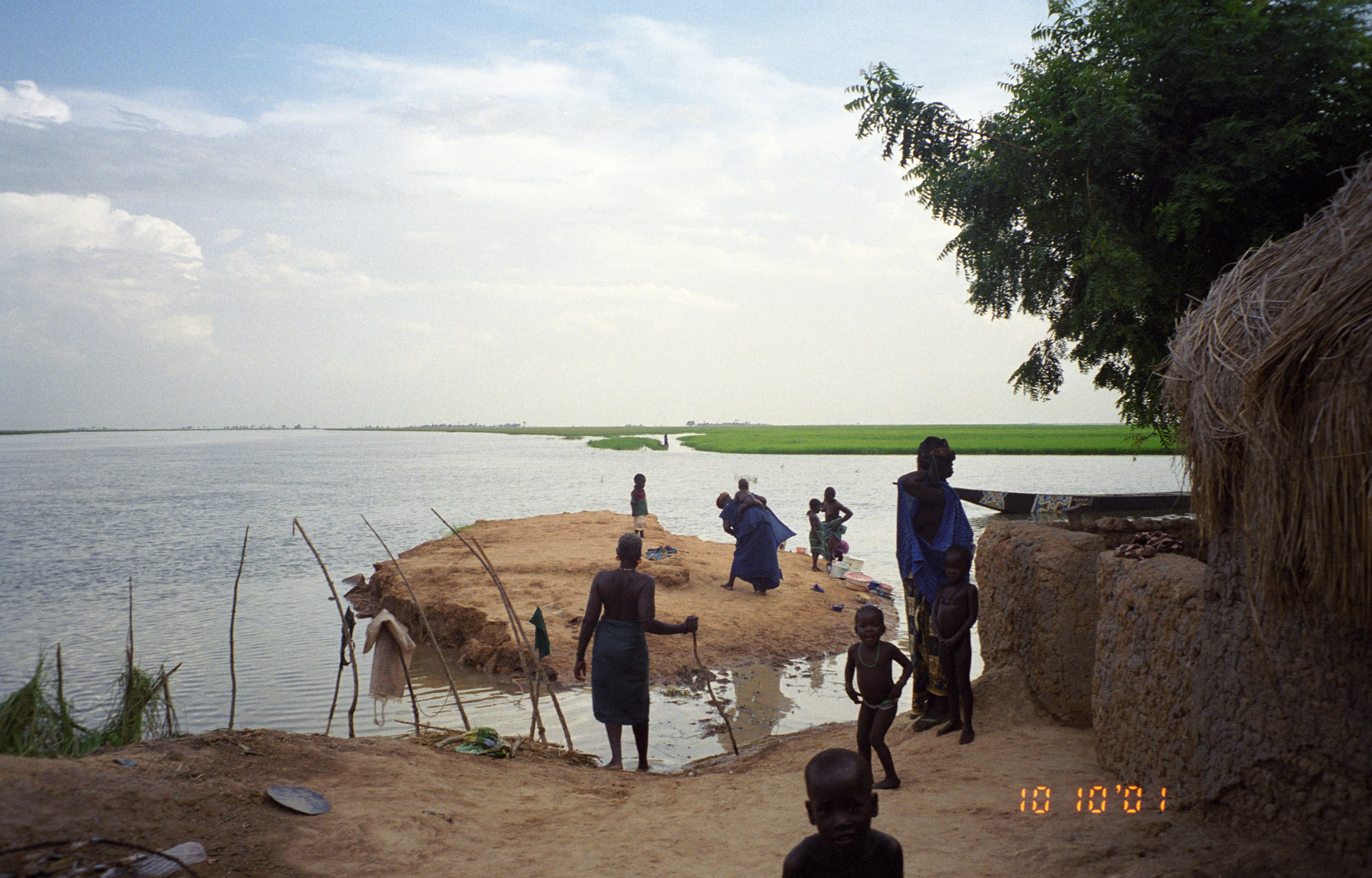
Bozo fishing village near kakalodaga, Mali, West Africa

Bozo (Somono) is the Mande-speaking fishing population of the Inland Niger Delta. Although the language of Bozo and Somono is different, they may have the same family names as both groups today claim Soninke ancestry from ancient Ghana. A fundamental difference between them is that the Bozo is an ethnic group, while the Somono is an occupational group. Thus, it has been said that "One must be born a Bozo, but anyone can become a Somono." Oral history portrays indigenous Bozo hunters and fishermen as the first inhabitants of Dia, which entered the Middle Niger region around 2000 BCE. Somono has been portrayed as namakalaw, a term that describes occupationally defined artisans who guard their professional secrets through endogamy and esoteric ritual procedures. The arrival of the Somono remains a contested issue, especially due to the malleable character of their identity. It is assumed that they developed a recognizable occupational group sometime before the 17th-century state of Segu.

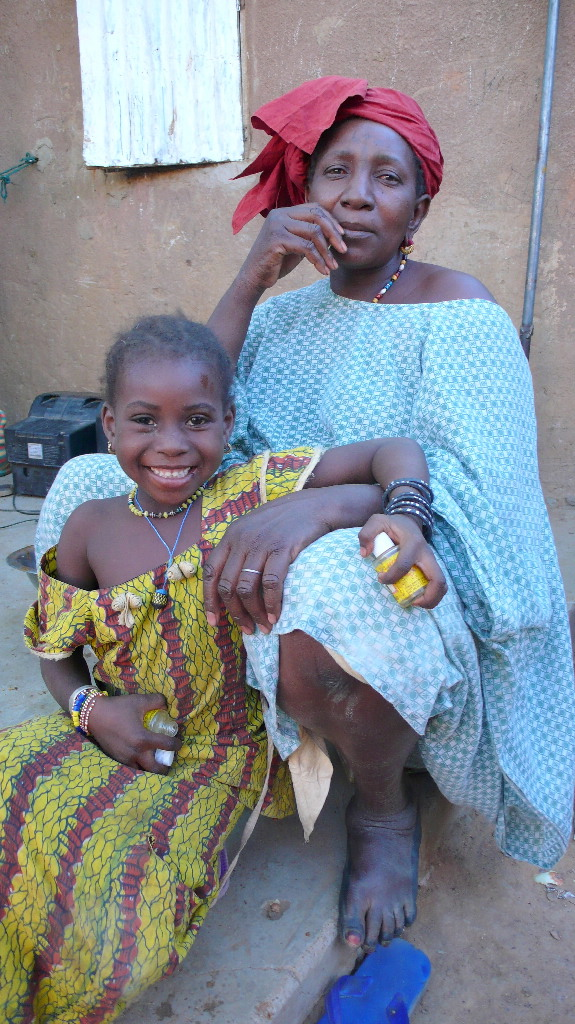
A woman and a girl Marka (Soninké)

Marka, which is also known as Soninke or Sarakole, typically lives further west between the Senegal River and Nioro in Mali. They are viewed as a cultural and historically derived group principally from earlier Soninke ethnic formations. Since the end of the Mali empire, the term 'Soninke' has preserved religious significance, which is Muslim.

They cultivate rice, have landowner rights over vast regions, and exercise important ritual functions. Marka of modern Dia is often described as marabouts, having followed the Tidjianist branch of Islam. They teach in Islamic schools and are renowned for their manufacture of powerful Islamic talismans, which are known as 'gris-gris'. The Marka have accentuated Dia's originality by abolishing all sorts of profane activities including a weekly market, and even French who created an administrative post at Dia, were quickly suppressed, which was hailed as a religious victory.

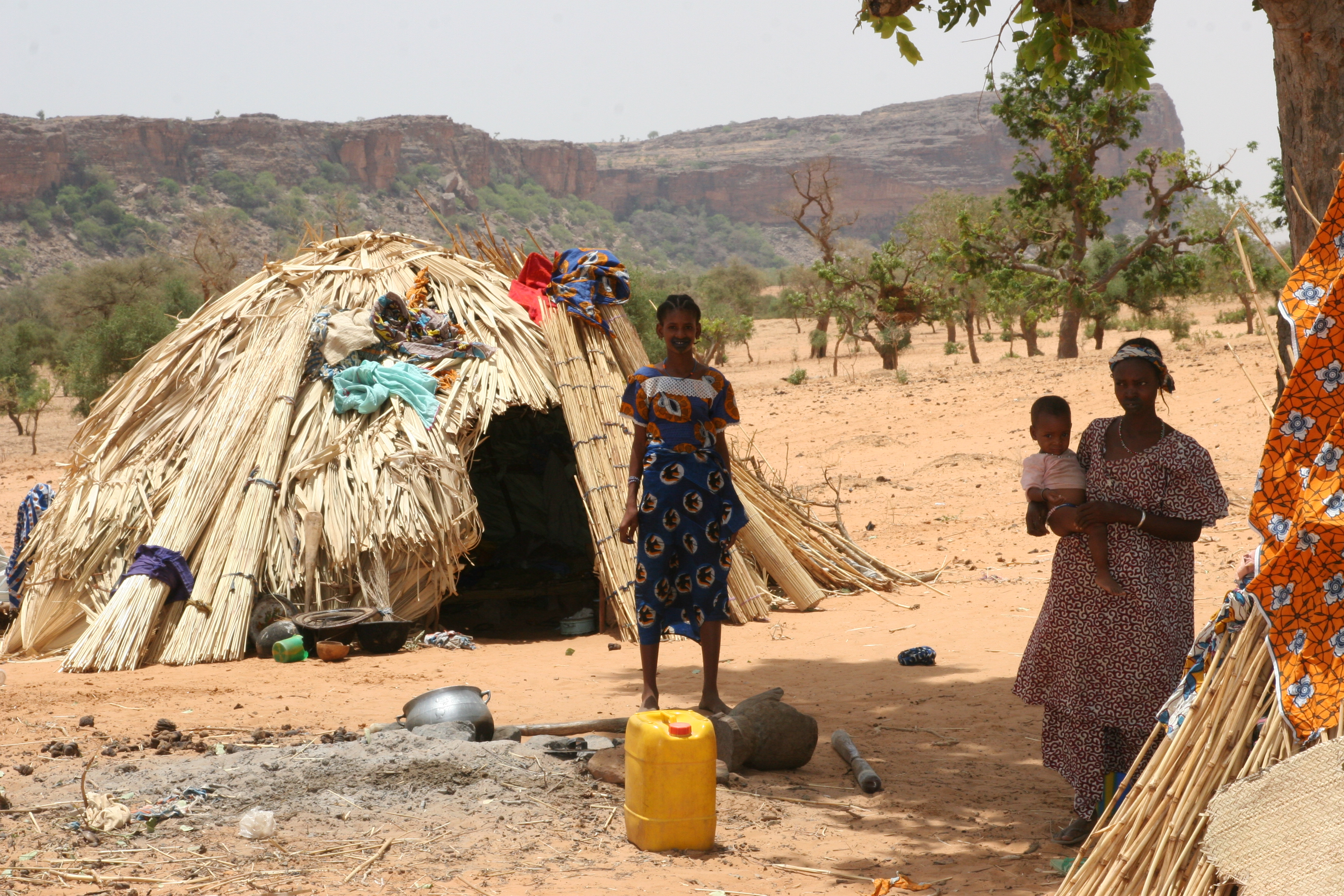
Fulani people, Mali

Peulh (Fulani) is a major population group of the Macina, now dominating the entire region, except for Dia which is governed by the Soninke. Due to their relatively light skin, many theories connect that with the North African Berber, but their language is part of the Niger-Congo family, not Afro-Asian such as in Berber. Rather, it indicates that their origin might be traced to what is modern Senegal. However, genetic evidence points out the Afro-Asiatic connection for modern Fulfulde speakers. This difference would be to postulate the existence of a coherent pastoral substrate in the Sahel prior to the eastward Fulfulde language expansion. Their pastoral lifestyles are considered as a reason for their migration to Inland Niger Delta, which is known for its vast and rich pastures. However, for the last two centuries, they have nearly all been sedentarised. The Peulh of the Macina is 95% Muslim.

Despite the complicated occupation history, Dia's material and cultural record including ceramics is surprisingly stable, particularly during the last 800 years. This might be explained in light of conformity to a broader 'state-level' identity during the period. Indeed, it has been widely acknowledged that the identities of each group are highly amorphous, which is attested by the Somono.

== Oral and written history ==
Dia's oral and written sources portray conflicting pasts, as the multiethnic communities support multiple versions of its cultural history and the arrival of Islam. The latter issue is particularly complex, as Dia prides itself on its Islamic traditions, while archaeological excavations have revealed relatively recent evidence for non-Islamic religious practices, diet, and rituals. It is important to understand that Dia's historical records have been subject to a continual process of change in order to justify present institutions, power structures, and religious authorities.

=== Written records ===
Most of the public and official archives regarding Dia are based on manuscripts written by Arab chroniclers. These records contribute to the understanding of the relatively recent history of Dia.

- Ibn Battuta: While traveling through western Sudan to the capital of the Kingdom of Mali in the 14th century, he mentions the place names of Zaghari and Zagha in his chronicle. Zagahari, which is assumed as a region in Dia, is described as a "big village inhabited by traders of Sudan called Wanjarata with whom live a company of white men who are Kharijites of the Ibadi sect called Saghanaghu." He also describes Zagha, which is identified as Dia, as having "a sultan, who owes obedience to the king of Mali and that its people are old in Islam". Thus, it provides testimony to the presence of the white trading community as well as to the history of Islam in the region.
- Timbuktu Chronicles: as-Sa'di and Ibn al-Mukhtar, the local historians of Timbuktu, respectively wrote about Songhay Empire which existed during the 15-16th centuries, and Zaagha in the 17th century. According to their chronicles, al-Hajj Askya Muhammad took Zaagha in 1494 or 1495. It mentions Dia in regard to its ancient history of Islam, stating that Dia was dominated by the fuqaha, and Dia's population organized a theocratic regime of their own during the 15th century. Ever since, Mali's sultan never dared to enter the town, and anyone who arrived in Dia was no longer regarded as a subject of Mali. It was known as the town of God, or "Balad Allah".

Scholarly literature regarding Dia constitutes works by historians, anthropologists, and geographers.

- Jean Gallais: In his book <Le Delta intérieur du Niger: étude de géographie régionale> (1967), he mainly reconstructs the pre-Islamic period by the application of oral traditions, which include the foundation stories of the various ethnic groups such as Bozo, Marka, and the Peulh. He believed that the Bozo was the original inhabitants of the Inland Niger Delta, followed by the group of rice cultivators. The rice cultivators later attached themselves to the Marka ethnic group, who are believed to have emerged with the formation of the Mali empire. Dia is mentioned again with the arrival of the Peulh, as the first region that they inhabited was Dia. When the theocratic state of the Dina in was established in 1818, the Marka merchants resisted. Thus, the sovereign disposed of the ruling of the Marka family conserving the animistic rituals of the Bozo, and confided the power to the Koreissi, a maraboutic family from the North. Gallais also illustrates Dia's commercial life, while being skeptical of Dia's reputation as a commercial center. According to Gallais, marabouts in the region have prohibited any profane activities which include intensive commerce as well as administrative matters.
- Germaine Dieterlen: In her paper <Mythe et Organisation sociale en Afrique Occidentale> (1959), she describes Dia's pre-Islamic material culture, visible at Mara's cemetery. This paper is often used to support the claim that Dia's pre-Islamic traditions might have persisted much longer than official accounts like to claim.
- Shinzo Sakai: As a Japanese historian, he undertook the most comprehensive synthesis of Dia's written and oral sources. His record includes Dia's foundation story, which starts with a pact between the autochthones and newcomers.
- Bâ, Amadou Hampâté, and Daget, Jacques: <L'empire peul du Macina> (1962) mention that Dia remained under the authority of a non-Islamic warrior dynasty, known as Diawara until its eventual submission to the Dina. After the submission, Dia became a truly Islamized city.
- Claude Meillassoux: According to his book, <L’ltineraire d ’Ibn Battuta de Walata a Malli> (1972), Dia was not particularly famous for commerce or as an Islamic center. Similar to Bâ and Daget, he states that Dia was ruled by Diawara who adopted the name of Traore. The Traore did not practice Islam and exercised a tyrannic rule over Dia's population. According to the Koreissi family, which is one of the last families to install themselves at Dia during the 18th or 19th century, the town was not completely Islamized at their arrival, which occurred during the reign of Sekou Amadou over the Massina Empire, who took away the power from the Traore and handed it over to the Koreissi.

While most of the chronicles written by Arab scholars emphasize the ancient history of Islam in the region, scholarly literature often rejects this claim.

It has been widely acknowledged that manuscripts written by Muslim chroniclers should be viewed with a certain amount of skepticism as it could lead us to an Orientalist discourse on sub-Saharan Africa, which considers Islamic influence as the driving force for important developments. Indeed, many places have exclusively been mentioned due to their strong adherence to Islam, as in the case of Dia.

=== Oral tradition ===
Dia's oral tradition lacks a unified coherent tradition, which might be understood in the light of its multi-ethnic communities. One of the main themes of the story is the autochthonous tradition of Dia's first inhabitants, the foundation of Dia, and the arrival of Islam.

- The first inhabitants and foundation: According to oral tradition, Dia's genesis is linked to the origins of the Bozo fisherfolk, who has been described as the Inner Niger Delta's first inhabitants. It was followed by a second population group of Marka origin, which was hunters, and once they formed an alliance, they supposedly settled on Mara. Bozo and Marka lived without formal leadership until Soninke warriors from ancient Ghana supposedly assimilated them underneath the leadership.
- The arrival of Islam: Dia's oral traditions associate Mara's foundation with the arrival of marabouts, and suggest that the region has been long known as one of West Africa's maraboutic centers. This aligns with Ibn Battuta's chronicles, which served to corroborate Dia's ancient reputation as an Islamic center.

=== Contrasting image with archaeological evidence ===
- The first inhabitants and foundation: Regarding Bozo, the archaeobotanical and faunal evidence have shown that Dia's first inhabitants were characterized by a mixed economy including rice cultivation, pastoralism, and the exploitation of aquatic resources. It could be argued that from the onset, diverse socio-economic groups cohabited at the region, or a single economically diverse population group resided. The different types of burials that coexist at Dia Shoma which dates back to 800 and 1000AD, indicate a region of cultural diversity. Many evidence points out that the Dia was settled by several incoming population groups from the northwest, the region known as the Méma, and not just by one occupation group. These settlers appear to have originated from Dhar Tichitt-Walata, as the earliest pottery at Shoma has been identified as a derivative of the Faïta Facies from the Méma.
- The arrival of Islam: It appears that the institutionalization of Islam might have contributed to the obliteration of Dia's pre-Islamic past. In contrast to the idea of Islam's ancient tradition and consolidating power, the majority of Dia's population probably practiced a syncretic form of Islam until the region's subjugation by the theocratic state of the Dina in the 19th century. The principal evidence comes from Shoma's cemetery, of which a total of 93 inhumations were excavated. The majority were buried in positions that clearly indicated non-Islamic funerary rituals, while a few burials that were described as Islamic-type burials, were only identified on the site surface, dating between the 18th and 19th centuries. Furthermore, the presence of Mara's terracotta figurines heads suggests that there might have been a reaction of traditionalists against an intrusive, exclusionary religion that would prohibit the veneration of ancestors. Numerous terracottas from unknown contexts, generated a consensus among art historians that these objects dated largely from the 15th through to the 18th centuries. It appears that the Inland Delta terracotta tradition continued roughly until the advent of jihads and Malian's ruler's conversion to Islam. However, since at least beginning of the 19th century, the Middle Niger region witnessed the institutionalization of Islam in a rigorous scale that it became preferential to obliterate any memories pertaining to non-Islamic traditions. In Dia, Islamic adherence has been especially vigorous as its population favors the memory of its Muslim ancestors, and may have led to the alteration in oral history. Thus, the case of the Dia well shows the political aspect of the oral history.
