= Diondiori =

- Commune and town
- Location in Mali
- Coordinates: 14°36′43″N 4°46′27″W
- Country: Mali
- Region: Mopti Region
- Cercle: Ténenkou Cercle

Area
  - Total: 824 km^{2} (318 sq mi)

Population (2009 census)
  - Total: 20,160
  - Density: 24.5/km^{2} (63.4/sq mi)
- Time zone: UTC+0 (GMT)

Diondiori is a small town and commune of the Cercle of Ténenkou in the Mopti Region of Mali. The commune includes 27 villages and in 2009 had a population of 20,160.

The market that is held in the town on Tuesdays serves many settlements in the surrounding region.

On may 9th, 2022, Malian Armed Forces (FAMa) would announce that earlier, at around 5.00 am GMT, militants of Katiba du Macina fired 10 82mm mortar shells from opposite right bank, of which 3 would hit the village. 2 children and 3 ruminants were killed, 4 people, including 2 children, were injured, and there was "Serious damage to the affected houses". FAMa would also report that the attacks were attempts to destroy the GSM network, and were "clearly directed against civilian populations, thus characterizing the cruelty of the terrorist group."
