= Kondo, Mali =

Kondo
- Village
- Location in Mali
- Coordinates: 14°32′45″N 4°51′12″W
- Country: Mali
- Region: Mopti Region
- Cercle: Ténenkou Cercle
- Commune: Ouro Ardo
- Time zone: UTC+0 (GMT)

Kondo is a small village and seat of the commune of Ouro Ardo in the Cercle of Ténenkou in the Mopti Region of southern-central Mali.
