= Siege of Timbuktu =

Siege during the Mali War

- Part of the Mali War
Date	8 August 2023 – present (3 years and 2 weeks)
Location	Timbuktu, Mali
Status	Ongoing

Belligerents
Mali; Wagner Group (alleged by JNIM)	Jama'at Nasr al-Islam wal Muslimin

Commanders and leaders
(Mali) Assimi Goïta	Iyad Ag Ghaly

The jihadist organisation Jama'at Nasr al-Islam wal Muslimin (JNIM) has imposed a complete blockade upon the city of Timbuktu, Mali since 8 August 2023. Since the beginning of the siege, 33,000 have fled the city and the surrounding areas to other nearby localities, while 1,000 others have fled to Mauritania. Intense shelling of the city has occurred throughout the siege. The blockade has sparked food and aid shortages in the city. The siege began after the withdrawal of MINUSMA, the United Nations mission to Mali during the Mali War.

== Siege ==
On 26 August, shelling near the Malian Solidarity Bank by jihadists killed a child and injured 4 other people, according to an army spokesman and a hospital source. Four days later, on 30 August, JNIM said they had shelled the military airport in Timbuktu, which they claimed was being used by Wagner Group mercenaries. On 11 September, Sky Mali, the last commercial airline still flying to Timbuktu, stated they had ceased flights to the city due to the deteriorating security situation. Shelling was reported at the airport on the day of the announcement. During JNIM's shelling of Timbuktu on 21 September, two were said to have been killed, and five injured. The death toll was updated to five the next day. On 27 September, JNIM claimed to have attacked a Malian military base near Timbuktu, initially with a car bomb, and then seized the base after heavy fighting. JNIM never specified casualties, nor did the FAMA confirm any loss of the base.

Due to mediation from local chiefs, insurgents briefly agreed to allow food trucks in to the city, although this decision was quickly reversed after they alleged that the Wagner Group and the Malian military were exploiting this to commit atrocities. Despite the blockade, locals still held an annual festival in December 2023 to promote unity and resilience in the face of the siege.

The siege escalated further during June 2025, when JNIM militants attacked a military base near the city. The attack began with a car packed with explosives. The airport was also shelled by mortars. Officials later reported that the operations around the military base had concluded, but that attackers were still present throughout the city. The Malian army reported that 14 attackers were neutralized and 31 suspected terrorists were arrested.
