= Battle of Farimake =

2018 battle of the Mali War

- Part of Operation Barkhane of the Mali War of the Sahel War
Date	November 22–23, 2018
Location	Farimake, Youwarou Cercle, Mali 15°28′12″N 4°36′44″W
Result	French victory

Belligerents
France	Jama'at Nusrat al-Islam wal-Muslimin; Katibat Macina

Commanders and leaders
Unknown	Amadou Koufa

Casualties and losses
None	35 killed (per France); 16 killed (per Katiba Macina)

The battle of Farimake took place between November 22 and 23, 2018, between French forces of Operation Barkhane and Katibat Macina, a regional variant of Jama'at Nasr al-Islam wal Muslimin. French forces launched an assault on Katiba Macina, claiming to have killed their leader Amadou Koufa.

== Prelude ==
At 6:00 p.m. on November 8, 2018, Amadou Koufa, the leader of Katiba Macina, released a video alongside Iyad Ag Ghaly and Djamel Okacha, urging Fulani people to launch an insurrection against their governments. Around the end of November 2018, Koufa gathered his forces in the Youwarou Cercle, Mopti Region, while civilians celebrated Mawlid.

== Battle ==
French forces launched an offensive on Katiba Macina on the night of November 22. Malian media stated that fighting broke out at Kourou and Nanana, two large ponds in the commune of Farimake. The operation was launched after months of joint intelligence gathering by French and Malian forces, but Malian troops did not partake in the battle. French troops first launched airstrikes on three Katiba Macina positions, near Sourango, before launching a helicopter-borne assault.

== Aftermath ==
The following day, French media stated 30 militants were killed, possibly including Amadou Koufa. Later that day, Le Monde assessed the death toll to be 34 militants killed. On November 24, the Malian Ministry of Defense stated Koufa was killed in the battle, having been seriously injured in the attack and succumbing to his injuries hours later in the Wagadou Forest. The Malian MoD also stated that two other Katiba Macina leaders - Djouretou, the base manager, and Bobala, operations manager - were both killed as well. Malian Prime Minister Maïga later claimed Koufa's body was not in the hands of Malian authorities. French forces later corroborated these statements on November 28, giving a final death toll of 35 killed.

Some sources within JNIM, including Abdelmalek Droukdel, denied accusations of Koufa's death, and stated only 16 militants were killed. On February 28, 2019, a video surfaced showing Koufa alive.
