= Koubi =

- Village
- Location in Mali
- Coordinates: 14°23′37″N 4°52′2″W
- Country: Mali
- Region: Mopti Region
- Cercle: Ténenkou Cercle
- Commune: Ouro Guiré
- Time zone: UTC+0 (GMT)

Koubi is a village and seat of the commune of Ouro Guiré in the Cercle of Ténenkou in the Mopti Region of southern-central Mali. The village lies on the north (left) bank of the Diaka, a branch of the Niger River that flows only when the river is in flood. Opposite Koubi, on the right bank, is the village of Sanga.

In May 1609 an army of the Pashalik of Timbuktu led by Qa'id Ahmad b. Yusuf was besieged in Koubi by the forces of the Songhai rump state in Dendi. The Pashalik was able to successfully relieve the town, but the Songhai commander, Dendi-fari Baru, caught a part of the relief force and defeated them near Lake Debo before returning to Dendi.
