= Tonka massacre =

2023 mass killing in Tombouctou Region, Mali

- Part of Mali War, Russian intervention in Mali war
- Location: Tonka, Tombouctou Region, Mali
- Date: November 12, 2023
- Target: Tuareg civilians
- Deaths: 70+
- Perpetrators: Malian Armed Forces; Wagner Group

On November 12, 2023, soldiers from the Malian Armed Forces and the Wagner Group killed over 70 civilians near the village of Tonka, Tombouctou Region, Mali.

== Background ==
In late 2023, the Malian government and it's ally the Russian paramilitary Wagner Group launched an offensive to capture Kidal, then held by Tuareg separatists. The Malian-Wagner forces would execute Tuareg civilians in remote desert towns after engaging in battle with rebels, leading to the Ersane massacre in late October. On the day before the massacre at Tonka, civilians were executed in the towns of Lossodji and Tindirma.

== Massacre ==
After entering Tonka on November 12, Malian-Wagner forces rounded up dozens of civilians in the town while the weekly market was going on. The civilians were executed by the soldiers, according to the victims' relatives, and thrown into two mass graves in the Tingomoro wadi between Tonka and Goundam. At least 70 civilians were killed in the massacre, although International Crisis Group said several dozen were killed.

The CSP-PSD condemned the massacre and accused the Malian-Wagner forces of responsibility. The latter did not respond to the accusations.
