= Ouro Guiré =

- Commune
- Location in Mali
- Coordinates: 14°23′37″N 4°52′2″W
- Country: Mali
- Region: Mopti Region
- Cercle: Ténenkou Cercle

Population (2009 census)
  - Total: 9,289
- Time zone: UTC+0 (GMT)

Ouro Guiré is a commune of the Cercle of Ténenkou in the Mopti Region of Mali. The commune lies to the southeast of the small town of Ténenkou in the Inner Niger Delta. It is crossed by the Diaka, a branch of the Niger River that flows only when the river is in flood. The principal village is Koubi. The commune contains 15 small villages and in 2009 had a population of 9,289. Most of the population are Fulani (French: Peul or Peulh; Fula: Fulɓe) with some Bozo. Traditionally, the Fulani raise livestock while the Bozo are fishermen.
