= Battle of Ndaki =

2018 battle of the Mali War

- Part of Mali War
Date	October 16–17, 2018
Location	Forest near Ndaki, Gao Region, Mali
Result	Franco-Malian victory

Belligerents
Mali; France	Jama'at Nasr al-Islam wal Muslimin: Katibat 3A

Commanders and leaders
Unknown	Almansour Ag Alkassam

Strength
Several dozen 2 Tiger helicopters, 2 Mirage planes	50 men

Casualties and losses
2 injured None	1 killed

Between October 16 and 17, 2018, joint Franco-Malian forces clashed with Jama'at Nasr al-Islam wal Muslimin in a forest near Ndaki, Mali.

== Prelude ==
In 2017, five jihadist groups - Ansar Dine, Al-Mourabitoun, Movement for Oneness and Jihad in West Africa, Katibat Macina, and Al-Qaeda in the Islamic Maghreb - that initially rebelled against the Malian government amidst the Tuareg rebellion in 2012, merged to form Jama'at Nasr al-Islam wal Muslimin. JNIM grew in power in late 2017, and soon intensified operations in southern Gao Region and Mopti Region.

The Ndaki region is considered a hotspot for Katibat Macina activity, in particular Katibat 3A, named for their leader Almansour Ag Alkassam.

== Battle ==
A skirmish broke out between joint Franco-Malian forces in a forest near Ndaki on October 16. Around fifty jihadists attacked Malian forces in the forest from two sides. Malian forces alerted nearby French forces in Operation Barkhane, who sent air support. The French helicopters came under small arms fire from the militants, and the helicopter subsequently responded. Ground troops were soon deployed, and the clashes continued into October 17. Patrick Steiger, spokesman for the French Armed Forces, stated that "tenacity of the terrorists...suggested that it was either a site important to them or someone important was present." That leader was likely Alkassam.

JNIM abandoned their camp on October 17, after which Malian and French forces seized the site.

== Aftermath ==
Two Malian soldiers were injured in the clashes, and one jihadist was killed. Steiger claimed that other wounded or killed jihadists were likely taken away by Katiba 3A overnight.
