= Sossobé =

- Village
- Location in Mali
- Coordinates: 14°33′39″N 4°40′26″W
- Country: Mali
- Region: Mopti Region
- Cercle: Ténenkou Cercle
- Commune: Togoro Kotia
- Time zone: UTC+0 (GMT)

Sossobé is a village and seat of the commune of Togoro Kotia in the Cercle of Ténenkou in the Mopti Region of southern-central Mali. The village lies in the Inner Niger Delta and between July and December is only accessible by boat.
