= Karéri =

- Commune
- Location in Mali
- Coordinates: 14°49′31″N 5°15′5″W
- Country: Mali
- Region: Mopti Region
- Cercle: Ténenkou Cercle
- Admin centre (chef-lieu): Dioura

Population (2009 census)
  - Total: 28,414
- Time zone: UTC+0 (GMT)

Karéri is a commune of the Cercle of Ténenkou in the Mopti Region of Mali. The main village and local government centre (chef-lieu) is Dioura. In 2009 the commune had a population of 28,414.
