= Andrey Averyanov =

Russian military officer

- Born: 29 September 1967 (age 59); Ashgabat, Turkmen SSR, Soviet Union
- Education: Tashkent Higher All-Arms Command School
- Military career
- Allegiance: Soviet Union (until 1991); Russia
- Branch: Soviet Army; Russian Ground Forces
- Service years: 1988–present
- Rank: Lieutenant General
- Commands: Deputy Director of the Main Directorate of the General Staff; Africa Corps; GRU Unit 29155
- Conflicts: Soviet-Afghan War; Bosnian War; First Chechen War; Second Chechen War; Russo-Ukrainian war; Russian intervention in Mali war
- Awards: Hero of the Russian Federation; Order of Courage (3)

Lieutenant General Andrey Vladimirovich Averyanov (Russian: Андрей Владимирович Аверьянов; born 29 September 1967) is a Russian military officer who has been the deputy director of the Main Directorate of the General Staff of the Russian Armed Forces (known by its former acronym GRU) since 2022. He is believed to be the commander of the Africa Corps since it was created in 2023. Averyanov previously commanded GRU Unit 29155, and was awarded the title Hero of the Russian Federation in 2015.

== Early life and education ==
Andrey Vladimirovich Averyanov was born on 29 September 1967 in Ashgabat, Turkmen SSR, Soviet Union. He lived at a military base and attended the Russian school there. Averyanov later graduated from the Tashkent Higher All-Arms Command School in 1988.

== Military career ==
He is believed to be a decorated veteran of the Soviet-Afghan War, peacekeeping operations during the Bosnian War, and both of the Chechen Wars, for which he was awarded the Order of Courage three times. Averyanov served as a military attaché at the Russian embassy in Warsaw, Poland, in 2004. As of 2008, he was a colonel. Averyanov holds the title Hero of the Russian Federation since January 2015, possibly for his involvement in the 2014 Russian annexation of Crimea. He is believed to have served in the Special Operations Forces Command, which is based at Senezh near Moscow and includes the "little green men".

Averyanov became the commander of GRU Unit 29155 in 2013, with the rank of major general. He recruited GRU and spetsnaz officers for the unit, which eventually grew have about 70 members. The unit is believed by Western intelligence to be responsible for coordinating Russian sabotage operations in Europe. Several Western governments accused Averyanov and Unit 29155 of being responsible for multiple incidents, including the 2014 Vrbětice ammunition warehouses explosions and the 2018 Skripal poisoning. The Russian government denies the allegations. In May 2024, the Czech Republic placed Averyanov on its wanted list, alleging that he orchestrated the 2014 warehouse explosions.

In 2022 Averyanov became the deputy director of the Main Directorate of the General Staff of the Russian Armed Forces (known by its former acronym GRU). He visited Israel on 8 February 2022, and visited Iran in June 2022, October 2022, February 2023, and July 2023. Some of the latter visits coincided with Iran beginning to provide weaponry to Russia for use in the Russo-Ukrainian war. After the start of the 2022 Russian invasion of Ukraine, Averyanov's original unit was expanded into a larger department, becoming the Special Activities Service (SSD). Its subordinate formations include Unit 21955, Unit 54654, and a planning department.

=== Africa Corps ===
He made his first public appearance at the July 2023 Russia–Africa Summit in Moscow. After that he joined members of the Russian Ministry of Defense on a tour of several African countries, as it took over the Wagner Group's operations in the region. The tour, lasting from August to September 2023, saw Averyanov and deputy defense minister Yunus-bek Yevkurov visit Burkina Faso, the Central African Republic, Libya, Mali, and Niger. The Africa Corps was established under the supervision of Yevkurov to take over from the Wagner Group in late 2023, and Averyanov reportedly became its commander on the continent.

As of November 2025, he held the rank of lieutenant general. That month he led a Russian delegation in talks with the president of Equatorial Guinea, Teodoro Obiang Nguema Mbasogo. In early December 2025, Radio France Internationale claimed that Averyanov was killed in a Ukrainian drone strike on a Russian "shadow fleet" tanker off the coast of Libya. However, the government of Madagascar announced later that month that he is visiting the country, and RFI eventually withdrew its claim after more evidence emerged that he is alive.
