= 2025 Dioura attack =

Jihadi attack in Mali

- Part of Mali War
Date	May 23, 2025
Location	Dioura, Tenenkou Cercle, Mali
Result	JNIM victory

Belligerents
Malian Armed Forces	Jama'at Nasr al-Islam wal Muslimin

Casualties and losses
41 killed	Unknown

On May 23, 2025, jihadists from Jama'at Nasr al-Islam wal Muslimin (JNIM) attacked a Malian military base at Dioura. Around 41 Malian soldiers were killed during the attack.

== Background ==
Dioura has been the site of several attacks by jihadist groups against Malian forces due to its location in the heart of the war-torn Tenenkou Cercle. The previous attack in 2023 was by Tuareg rebels against Malian and Russian forces, and killed nearly 100 soldiers. Since the spring of 2025, JNIM has intensified their attacks on Malian forces, leading to a string of deadly attacks.

== Attack ==
The attack began before noon on May 23 at the Dioura military camp. The attack was led by Abu Mokhtar al-Ansari and Houssein Ghoulam, a former colonel in the Malian army and later a rebel leader in the Arab Movement of Azawad (MAA), who defected to JNIM in 2024. The Malian defenders received no reinforcements during the attack and were obliterated. JNIM fighter overran both the base and the nearby town of Dioura. The attackers seized vehicles and weapons, and evacuated the area later that day.

The Malian government did not issue a statement about the attack. JNIM claimed responsibility shortly afterward, saying they killed 40 Malian soldiers. RFI stated that according to the head of the Malian military camp and his deputy, the death toll was 41 soldiers killed.
