= Diaka, Mali =

Diaka
- Commune
- Location in Mali
- Coordinates: 14°21′7″N 4°57′25″W
- Country: Mali
- Region: Mopti Region
- Cercle: Ténenkou Cercle

Population (2009 census)
  - Total: 19,763
- Time zone: UTC+0 (GMT)

Diaka is a commune of the Cercle of Ténenkou in the Mopti Region of Mali. The principal village lies at Dia. In 2009 the commune had a population of 19,763.
