= Ouro Ardo =

- Commune
- Location in Mali
- Coordinates: 14°32′45″N 4°51′12″W
- Country: Mali
- Region: Mopti Region
- Cercle: Ténenkou Cercle
- Admin centre (chef-lieu): Kondo

Population (2009 census)
  - Total: 9,114
- Time zone: UTC+0 (GMT)

Ouro Ardo is a commune of the Cercle of Ténenkou in the Mopti Region of Mali. The local government is based in the village of Kondo. The commune includes 29 small villages and in 2009 had a population of 9,114.
