= Battle of Boulikessi (2025) =

Jihadist victory in the Mali War

- Part of Mali War
Date	June 1, 2025
Location	Boulikessi, Douentza Cercle, Mali
Result	JNIM victory: Malian forces abandon the Boulikessi base

Belligerents
Malian Army; Wagner Group	Jama'at Nasr al-Islam wal Muslimin

Strength
Unknown	~100 fighters

Casualties and losses
~100 dead 22 captured	Unknown

On June 1, 2025, jihadists from Jama'at Nasr al-Islam wal-Muslimin attacked Malian and Russian forces in Boulikessi, Mali. Around 100 Malian soldiers were killed in the attack, and the jihadists seized control of the Malian military base in the town.

== Background ==
Since the spring of 2025, JNIM has intensified their attacks on Malian forces, leading to a string of deadly attacks. A week prior to the attack in Boulikessi, JNIM killed forty Malian soldiers in Dioura, and several military bases across the border in Burkina Faso were attacked by the militant group. Boulikessi is a prime target for JNIM attacks due to its remote location, inhibiting the arrival of Malian reinforcements. In 2019, JNIM attacked Malian soldiers in Boulikessi and killed 40, at the time making it the deadliest attack in Malian history after the Second Battle of Kidal.

== Battle ==
The attack occurred on June 1, when a number of JNIM fighters assaulted the Malian military barracks in the city. JNIM fighters released photos and videos of them roaming the base and of the fighting for it. The Malian army stated they reacted "vigorously to the attack in central Mali before withdrawing". Footage from the attack showed over 100 attackers participating. The jihadists looted the weapons in the barracks before retreating.

JNIM claimed responsibility for the attack on June 4, saying they killed over 100 soldiers and captured 22 others. Shortly after the attack, JNIM released a video of the captives divided into small groups. On June 10, they showed another video of 20 captured soldiers from Boulikessi.

According to RFI, between 75 and 90 Malian soldiers were killed during the battle for the base as of June 3. Following the discovery of new graves the next day, that toll was increased to 100 dead. RFI also stated that Russian soldiers from the Wagner Group were killed, although JNIM didn't publish any photos of Russian casualties. The Malian government hasn't issued any casualty figures.

== Aftermath ==
The Malian government attempted to retake the Boulikessi camp on June 5, but was ambushed again and suffered several casualties. The base was abandoned on June 6.

On June 2, a day after the initial attack on Boulikessi, JNIM launched a similar attack on Malian forces in Timbuktu, hitting the Sidin Bekaye base and the airport.
