= Sougoulbé =

- Commune
- Location in Mali
- Coordinates: 14°32′2″N 4°53′8″W
- Country: Mali
- Region: Mopti Region
- Cercle: Ténenkou Cercle

Population (2009 census)
  - Total: 9,099
- Time zone: UTC+0 (GMT)

Sougoulbé is a commune of the Cercle of Ténenkou in the Mopti Region of Mali. The principal village is Kora. The commune contains 17 small villages and in 2009 had a population of 9,099.
