= Togoro Kotia =

- Commune
- Location in Mali
- Coordinates: 14°33′39″N 4°40′29″W
- Country: Mali
- Region: Mopti Region
- Cercle: Ténenkou Cercle

Area
  - Total: 1,000 km^{2} (390 sq mi)

Population (2009 census)
  - Total: 13,687
  - Density: 14/km^{2} (35/sq mi)
- Time zone: UTC+0 (GMT)

Togoro Kotia is a commune of the Cercle of Ténenkou in the Mopti Region of Mali. The principal village lies at Sossobé. The commune contains 13 villages and in 2009 had a population of 13,687.

The commune lies in the Inner Niger Delta, and each year between July and December, the area is flooded. During this period most villages can only be accessed by boat.
