= Raid on Dioura (2019) =

Jama'at Nasr al-Islam wal Muslimin attack on Mali military base in 2019

- Part of Mali War
Date	March 17, 2019
Location	Dioura, Mali
Result	JNIM victory

Belligerents
Mali	Jama'at Nasr al-Islam wal Muslimin; Katibat Macina

Commanders and leaders
Mohamed Sidati Ould Cheikh †	Amadou Koufa

Strength
~100	Several dozen

Casualties and losses
26 killed (per Mali and UN); 17 injured	3 killed (per JNIM)

The raid on Dioura was an attack on a Malian military base in the town of Dioura, Mali, by Jama'at Nasr al-Islam wal Muslimin (JNIM) on March 17, 2019.

== Prelude ==
The town of Dioura is located in the west of Mali's Mopti Region. Throughout the late 2010s, the region had been a hotspot for Katibat Macina attacks, a group affiliated with JNIM. However, western Mopti had less frequent attacks compared to eastern Mopti. At the time of the attack, the Malian base in the village was defended by a company of the Malian Army commanded by Mohamed Sidati Ould Cheikh. Later, JNIM stated that Amadou Koufa led the raid on Dioura, in contrast to the Malian Army's claims that the raid was led by Ba Ag Moussa.

== Raid ==
The attack began on the morning of March 17, around 6am local time. Several dozen jihadists launched the attack aboard pickups and motorcycles. Some attackers infiltrated the town of Dioura prior to the fighting. The raid began after an explosive-laden motorcycle driven by a suicide bomber rammed into the Dioura camp. The camp was then attacked from the north and the southeast. Malian soldiers at the camp put up a resistance that lasted several hours. The jihadists then set several vehicles, including tank trucks and ammo storage, alight. Around 4pm, the Malian government announced it had regained control of the Dioura camp.

== Aftermath ==
On March 18, the Malian government announced a provisional death toll of 23 killed and 17 wounded, with no Malian troops taken prisoner. Several soldiers who were initially declared missing were later found in villages around 20 kilometers from Dioura. A military source and local official stated the death toll was 21 Malian soldiers killed. The Malian opposition, Front for the Safeguard of Democracy, announced a toll of over 20 killed, along with twenty missing, eight vehicles burned, and eight vehicles captured.

The commander of the Malian forces, Mohamed Sidati Ould Cheikh, was killed in the battle. The bodies were buried on March 18 near Dioura. On March 21, new bodies had been discovered, with the Malian government updating the death toll to 26 killed. This was corroborated in a May 31, 2019 MINUSMA report.

JNIM claimed that three of their fighters had been killed, along with the deaths of 30 Malian soldiers. The group also claimed the capture of several vehicles and a cache of weapons.

The raid on Dioura was the deadliest day for the Malian army since the Second Battle of Kidal in 2014.
