= Battle of Anoumalane =

2025 battle of the Mali War

- Part of the Mali War
| Date | 13 June 2025 |
| Location | near Anoumalane, Kidal Region, Mali |
| Result | FLA victory |

Belligerents
| FAMa; Russia: Africa Corps | Azawad Liberation Front |

Strength
| Unknown number of soldiers ~30 vehicles | Unknown |

Casualties and losses
| ~45 killed 7-21 vehicles destroyed 15 vehicles captured | 3 killed 7 injured |

On 13 June 2025, rebels from the Azawad Liberation Front (FLA) attacked Malian soldiers and their allies near Anoumalane, in rural Kidal Region, Mali. The battle was the largest defeat for Malian and allied Russian forces since the battle of Tinzaouaten nearly one year earlier.

== Background ==
The FLA was founded in early 2025 as the merger of several Tuareg rebel groups that had fought the Malian government since 2012. The FLA maintained the regions of activity of its predecessor the CSP-PSD, who were located in northern Kidal region along the Algerian border. In July 2024, the CSP-PSD ambushed a convoy of Malian and Russian soldiers near Tinzaouaten, killing dozens of soldiers and marking the largest defeat for the Wagner Group since its intervention into the Mali War in 2022. After the loss of many of the Wagner Group's top commanders in the region, the Russian government subsumed the activities of Wagner Group and rebranded to the Russian government-ran Africa Corps.

== Battle ==
On June 11, a logistics convoy of the Malian Army (FAMa) and the Russian mercenaries Africa Corps left the town of Anéfis towards Aguelhok with around thirty vehicles. The next day, the convoy fell into an ambush in Tadjereet, where three vehicles were blown up by IEDs. On June 13 at around 7am, the convoy was ambushed by FLA fighters in Anoumalane, about forty kilometers from Aguelhok. For two hours, the rebels fired heavy weapons from a distance, avoiding close combat. The Malian army responded to the ambush with drone and airstrikes, ending the battle.

In a statement published on the afternoon of June 13, FAMa dismissed reports of any "alleged attack", saying that there were "false reports intended to instill fear and disturb public opinion." Two hours later, this statement was amended where FAMa claimed to have defeated an "armed terrorist group" with an assault on June 12 and a "lightning response" on June 13. That same day, the FLA claimed a "great victory" and stated the bulk of the convoy had been "annihilated."

== Aftermath ==
The FLA stated that several dozen soldiers were killed, including Africa Corps soldiers and specified that around fifteen bodies were left at the scene of the fighting. The FLA said only ten vehicles managed to escape, and that 21 vehicles were destroyed and 15 were captured. Images showing the bodies of white men in combat gear and destroyed and captured vehicles were broadcast by the FLA and pro-FLA accounts. Within their ranks, the FLA stated three fighters were killed and seven were injured.

According to Le Monde, at least seven vehicles were destroyed in the battle and five others managed to escape, while a helicopter was reportedly hit and forced to land in Tessalit. Malian security and civilian sources confirmed the destruction of many vehicles to RFI. Research group All Eyes on Wagner confirmed the deaths of 45 Russian and Malian soldiers. The Malian army did not give a casualty toll outside of saying they killed several "enemy combatants".
