= Africa Corps (Russia) =

Russian expeditionary paramilitary group in Africa

- Африканский корпус
- Sleeve patch of the corps
- Founded: 2023–present
- Allegiance: Russia
- Size: Mali ~1,000; Central African Republic ~1,500–2,000; Libya ~800–1,200; Niger ~100; Burkina Faso ~300; Togo ~ Hundreds; Equatorial Guinea ~200
- Part of: Ministry of Defence
- Engagements: Russo-Ukrainian war; Kharkiv offensive; War in the Sahel; Mali War; Battle of Anoumalane; 2026 Mali offensives; Battle of Anéfis (2026); 2026 Dioura attack; 2026 Nigerien coup attempt
- Website: africancorpus.ru африкакорпус.рф

Commanders
- Current commander: Lt. Gen. Andrey Averyanov

Insignia
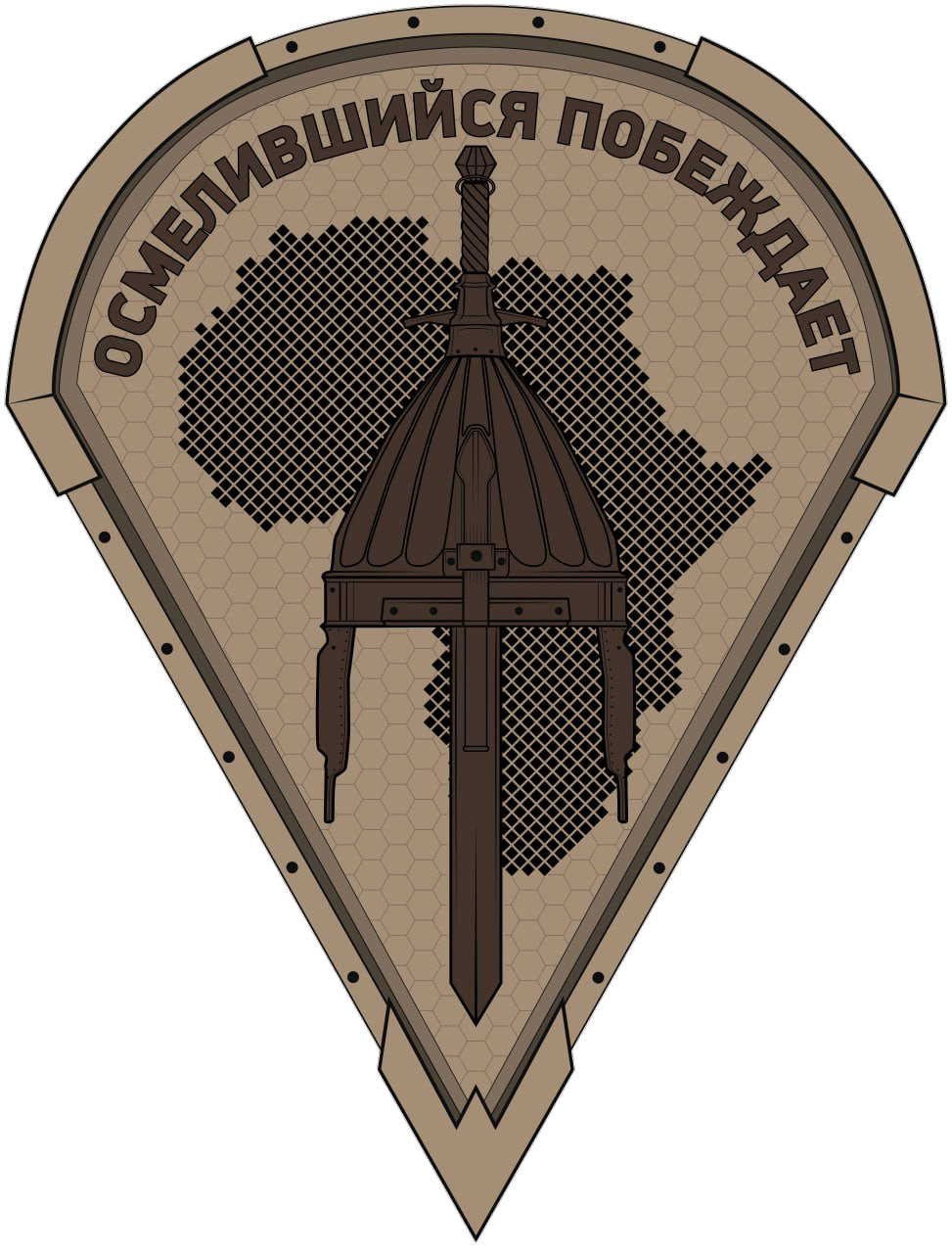
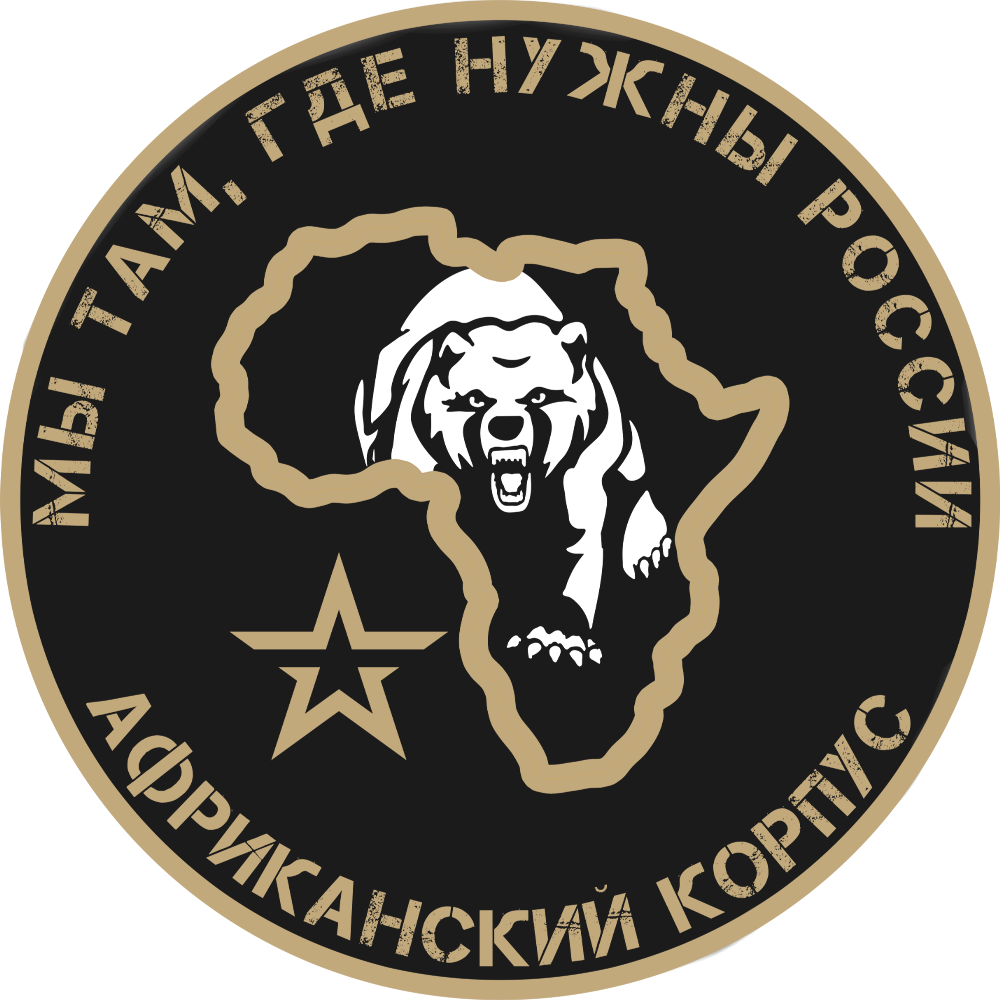
- Emblems

The Africa Corps (Russian: Африканский корпус, romanized: Afrikanskiy korpus) is a Russian paramilitary organization established by the Ministry of Defence (MoD), which serves as an expeditionary force designed to advance Russian strategic, economic, and geopolitical interests in Africa. The corps largely took over the African operations of the Wagner Group by subsuming and rebranding its structures. The unit has been accused of engaging in atrocities against civilians in Mali.

The corps is part of a broader Russian strategy to increase its influence in Africa, where it competes with the United States as part of a broader geopolitical rivalry. The Africa Corps operates through a mix of mercenaries and volunteers. Estimates of its size vary.

== History ==
The Africa Corps was established by the Russian MoD in 2023 in attempt to consolidate control over the Russian private military company (PMC) scene as a result of the Wagner Group–Russian Ministry of Defence conflict. The conflict had come to a head in the Wagner Group rebellion and subsequent death of Wagner leader Yevgeny Prigozhin in a plane crash in Tver Oblast.

The corps' name alludes to a German expeditionary force with the same name under Nazi Germany, the Afrika Korps, which was deployed to North Africa during World War II.

Konstantin Mirzayants, a purported leader of Redut PMC, has been closely involved in the MoD's operations in Africa and the creation of the Africa Corps.

The formation has cooperated with other government-controlled structures in Africa, such as Redut unit "Bears Brigade."

The UK Defence Ministry claimed that the Africa Corps was also deployed in the 2024 Kharkiv offensive during the Russo-Ukrainian war.

== Organization ==
The Africa Corps reports directly to the Russian MoD, with suspected links to Russian military intelligence service GRU. Russian deputy defence minister Yunus-bek Yevkurov oversees the direct management of the corps while lieutenant general Andrey Averyanov is in charge of military affairs. Its presumed administrative building in Moscow is adjacent to the Central Scientific Research Institute of Chemistry and Mechanics, a classified military research institute which has been linked to activities conducted on behalf of the GRU. Averyanov has previously led a notorious GRU unit until at least 2022.

According to an investigation by French outlet Jeune Afrique, former Redut leader Konstantin Mirzayants is in charge of the corps' operations in Africa. Africa Corps operations in Mali are overseen by Andrey “Kep” Nikolaevich Ivanov and Ivan “Miron” Alexandrovich Maslov, both of whom were previously in charge of Wagner troops in Mali.

The Africa Corps has a smaller and more integrated role compared to Wagner, focusing on providing military support, training, and urban counterterrorism cooperation with local Russia-aligned governments in countries. The Russian government aims to use this entity to project influence, filling the security vacuum left by the withdrawal of Western powers, especially France, from the Sahel region. Russia also seeks to gain control over strategic resources like uranium, particularly in Niger, as well as leverage migration routes for geopolitical purposes.

== Sanctions ==
In November 2024, the United Kingdom sanctioned the Africa Corps along with the Espanola formation and 81st Special Forces Brigade. According to British foreign secretary David Lammy, the goal is to "counter illegal Russian activities, hinder the destabilisation of African countries and to interrupt supply for the Russian war effort in Ukraine".

In December 2024, the EU sanctioned Averyanov.

== Activities ==
=== Libya ===
Russia has provided support to the de facto ruler of eastern Libya, Khalifa Haftar, and his Libyan National Army (LNA) since at least 2018. The MoD began replacing Wagner mercenaries in Libya with Africa Corps troops in the spring of 2024. Estimates from 2024 put the number of Africa Corps troops in the country at 1,800.

Russian personnel operate several military bases in eastern Libya, and Russia is investing in their expansion, including an air base and a naval base in Tobruk. The corps' Libyan operations also serve as logistics nodes for its activities elsewhere on the continent.

=== Mali ===
In December 2024, the Russian MoD deployed 1,000 Africa Corps troops to Mali, where 1,500 Wagner mercenaries were still based under the command of Ruslan Sergeevich Zlobin. The Wagner troops were deployed mainly in the north of the country, while the Africa Corps was concentrated in Bamako and central Mali.

On 6 June 2025, Wagner announced its departure from Mali, with the Africa Corps taking over operations in support of the Malian military junta. The corps thus became the only Russian force present in the country. Several Wagner leaders, however, moved over to the Africa Corps with some of their men, including Andrey "Kep" Ivanov, Ruslan "Rusich" Zaprudsky, and Alexander "Ratibor" Kuznetsov. Around 2,000 Russian troops remained in Mali.

Africa Corps operations in Mali have seen mixed results. In June 2025, a Su-24M bomber belonging to the corps went down in the Niger River near Gao, officially due to poor weather, though Tuareg separatists claimed it was shot down in combat. During the 2026 Mali offensives, a helicopter belonging to the corps was shot down by the Tuareg Azawad Liberation Front, with both the crew and mobile fire group being killed. Following the attacks, the Africa Corps abandoned the city of Kidal. In July 2026, Tuareg fighters released footage of what they said was an Africa Corps helicopter crashing after reportedly being shot down amidst what Al Jazeera described as escalating clashes between armed groups and Malian and Russian forces.

On 21 April 2026, the Russian Ministry of Defence reported that the corps rescued two employees of a Russian geological exploration company who were abducted by Jama'at Nusrat al-Islam wal-Muslimin in Niger two years earlier.

The Africa Corps in Mali has been accused of atrocities such as burning down of villages, gang rape and sexual slavery, and other abuses such as beheadings and abductions. In December 2025, the Associated Press learned of an alleged rape of a 14-year-old girl by Africa Corps members who, according to her family, burst into their tent and forced the rest of the family out at gunpoint before taking the girl into it as she tried to defend herself. In June 2026, two Tuareg civilian men, Ousmane Ag Sidi and Abdoulwahab Ag Mahamad, were arrested and shot dead by a Malian army patrol and their Africa Corps auxiliaries while they were leaving the village of Zahro. The former's body was then dismembered, and his severed arms and legs were arranged around his severed head in the shape of a swastika. Le Monde stated that "Russian Africa Corps soldiers had never gone so far in terms of horror". In August 2026, Human Rights Watch reported that Africa Corps forces summarily killed nine civilians back in July in central Mali, including four children.

=== Burkina Faso ===
Africa Corps personnel first arrived in Burkina Faso on 24 January 2024. The initial deployment of 100 troops was to be expanded to 300. The corps' first base in Africa was established in Loumbila, north-east of Burkina Faso's capital Ouagadougou.

=== Niger ===
Dozens of Africa Corps troops arrived in Niamey in April 2024. They were stationed at Niamey’s Air Base 101 before US forces had vacated the base. 2025 estimates put the number of Africa Corps troops in Niger between 200 and 300, mostly engaged in intelligence, training and surveillance.

Africa Corps troops engaged fighters of the Islamic State's Sahel Province and West Africa Province in the January 2026 Diori Hamani International Airport attack. The corps also intervened in the 2026 Nigerien coup attempt.

=== Togo ===
Togo and Russia signed a military cooperation framework in 2025, including intelligence sharing, joint military exercises, and the possibility for the Russian Navy to dock at the port of Lomé.

Africa Corps personnel first arrived in Togo in January 2026. Between 300 and 350 troops are deployed to Lomé and military bases in northern Togo as of July 2026. Russia shipped military equipment for Africa Corps troops based in Mali via the Togolese port of Lomé for the first time in July 2026. Africa Corps soldiers travelled from Mali to Lomé, arriving on July 10. They then escorted the supplies in a convoy through Togo and Burkina Faso before reaching Bamako on July 25.

=== Equatorial Guinea ===
In the fall of 2024, Russia deployed up to 200 Africa Corps troops to Equatorial Guinea to protect the presidency of Teodoro Obiang Nguema Mbasogo and train elite units in the country's two main cities, Malabo and Bata. Africa Corps commander Averyanov was officially received by Obiang in Malabo in November 2025.

=== Sudan ===
Wagner mercenaries first arrived in Sudan in 2017, numbering around 300 by 2022. Although there has been no official transfer from Wagner to the Africa Corps, Russian forces in Sudan as of 2026 are likely associated with the corps.

=== Central African Republic ===
The Wagner Group first arrived in the Central African Republic (CAR) in 2018, remaining even after the death of Prigozhin in 2023. The CAR is the only country where Wagner is still active as of August 2026. Despite mounting pressure from Moscow for the deployment of Africa Corps and Wagner’s departure, Wagner has been able to maintain its position. The group is deeply entrenched in CAR. Wagner provides regime security for President Faustin-Archange Touadéra, exploits natural resources such as gold, diamonds, and timber, and is involved in drug trafficking.

=== Guinea ===
The port of Conakry is an important logistics node for Africa Corps forces stationed in the Sahel.

=== Madagascar ===
No Africa Corps troops are deployed to Madagascar as of August 2026.

A Russian delegation headed by Africa Corps commander Averyanov met in December 2025 with Madagascar's interim president Michael Randrianirina and discussed personal protection for the president. In January 2026, Russia sent military equipment and personnel to train the Madagascar Armed Forces followed by another shipment of military supplies in June 2026.

== See also ==
- Fakel (company)
