= Diafarabé =

- Commune and village
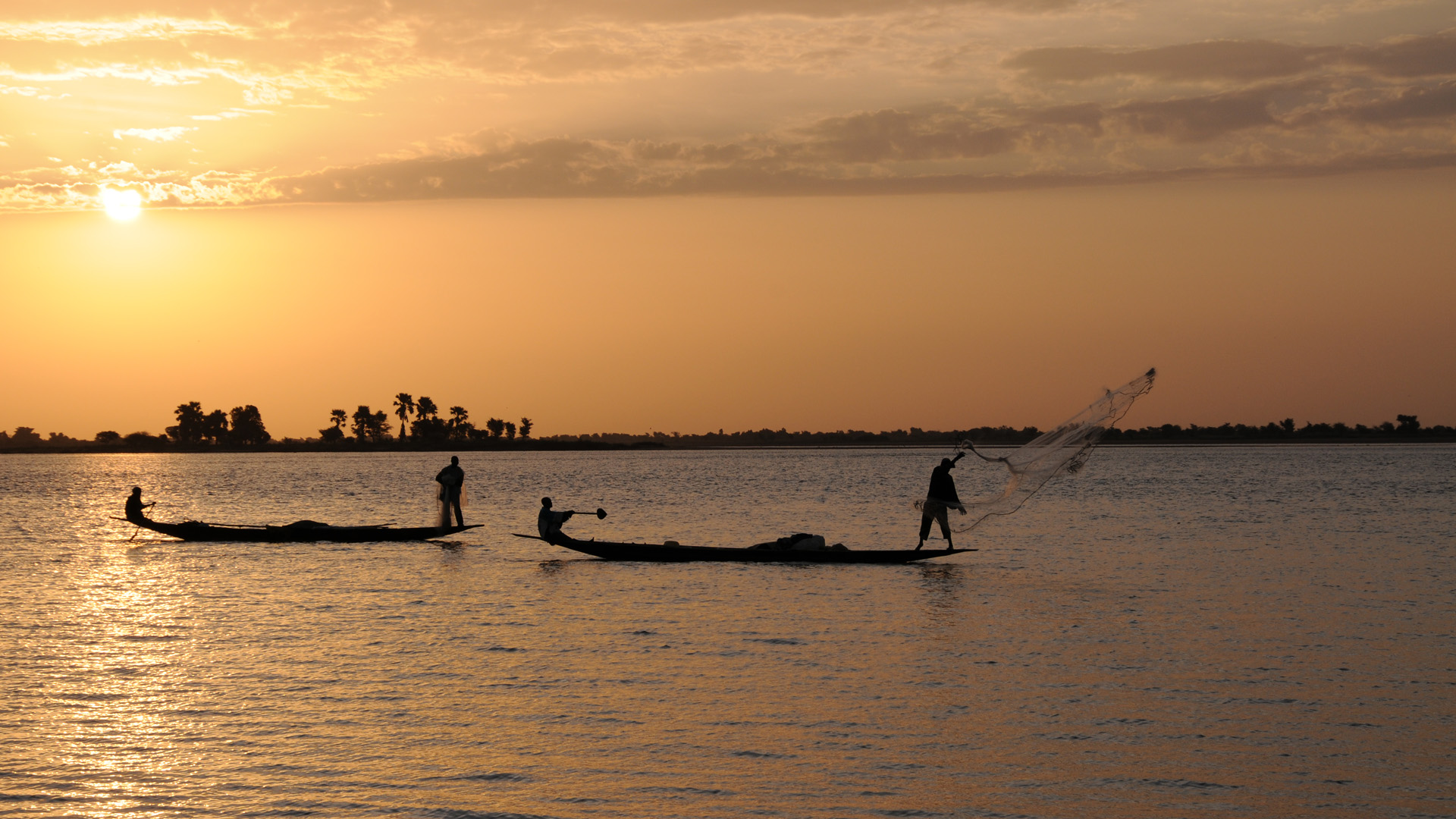

- Location in Mali
- Coordinates: 14°8′20″N 5°1′8″W
- Country: Mali
- Region: Mopti Region
- Cercle: Ténenkou Cercle

Area
  - Total: 980 km^{2} (380 sq mi)

Population (2009 census)
  - Total: 15,748
  - Density: 16/km^{2} (42/sq mi)
- Time zone: UTC+0 (GMT)

Diafarabé is a village and rural commune of the Cercle of Ténenkou in the Mopti Region of Mali. The commune is at the southern boundary of the cercle. It covers an area of approximately 980 square kilometers and extends on both sides of the Niger River. The commune includes 10 villages and in the 2009 census had a population of 15,748. The main village of Diafarabé, the chef-lieu, is situated on the north bank of the river next to the junction with the Diaka Channel, a distributary that only flows when the Niger is in flood.

A market takes place in the village on Mondays and serves many settlements in the surrounding area.

Every year in late November thousands of cattle are shepherded across the Diaka as they return to the grazing areas in the Inner Niger Delta. The Traversée des Animaux is an important festival for village.
