= Abeïbara massacres =

- Part of Mali War
- Location: Villages around Abeïbara, Kidal Region, Mali
- Date: June 20–29, 2024
- Target: Tuaregs
- Deaths: 70+
- Perpetrators: FAMa; Wagner Group

The Abeïbara massacres were several massacres carried out by the Malian Armed Forces and Wagner Group against Tuareg civilians in and around Abeïbara, Mali between June 20 and 29, 2024. At least seventy people were killed in the massacres.

== Background ==
Following renewed conflict between former Tuareg rebel groups now under the coalition CSP-PSD and the Malian junta aided by Russian mercenaries from the Wagner Group that began in August 2023, Malian and Wagner forces launched an offensive on the Tuareg rebel capital of Kidal, capturing it in November 2023. Remaining CSP-PSD fighters fled to the rural towns of Abeïbara, Tinzaouaten, and the Adrar des Ifoghas mountains. The Abeibara area also has a presence of the jihadist coalition Jama'at Nasr al-Islam wal Muslimin (JNIM).

In June 2024, Malian and Wagner forces conducted an operation around Abeibara. Their convoys left the towns of Kidal and Tessalit, and settled in Imaswaqassen, a village four kilometers from Abeibara. Clashes broke out with the CSP-PSD in this area between June 21 and 22, and JNIM detonated nine IEDs near and on the Malian and Wagner forces.

== Massacres ==
Malian and Wagner forces launched reprisal attacks on civilians, assuming they were harboring CSP-PSD or JNIM militants. These killings took place between June 20 and 29. The son of the chief of Abeibara stated that the Malian and Wagner forces killed old men and shepherds and looted everything valuable they owned. The massacres took place in a forty kilometer radius in the villages of Aghli, Emadjlal, Hidjous, Akomas, Ouzen, and several others. Photos began circulating online of bodies in the streets of the villages. Tuareg civil rights organization Kal Akal dubbed the massacres as an ethnic cleansing campaign against Tuaregs. Malian and Wagner forces also poisoned water wells to kill livestock and civilians in Abeibara.

The exact death toll of the massacres is unknown. JNIM reported that 15 people were killed. RFI reported that all of the people were killed were civilians, with the exception of one CSP-PSD fighter and one to six JNIM jihadists. Wassim Nasr reported at least seventy civilians were killed or missing, citing local groups. Some of the bodies were put in mass graves, while others were tied up and scattered in the bush in isolation. No clan of Tuareg was targeted in particular; Ifoghas Tuaregs, Imghad Tuaregs, and Daoussahak were all targeted and killed. Many of the Imghad and Daoussahak were refugees from the Ménaka offensive in 2022 and 2023.
