= Amadou Koufa =

Militant leader in the Mali War (born 1961)

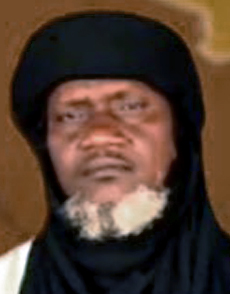
- Koufa in 2017
- Born: Amadou Diallo; 1961 (age 64–65); Saraféré, Niafunké Cercle, Mali
- Allegiance: Ansar Dine (2012–2017); Katiba Macina (2015–present); Jama'at Nusrat al-Islam wal Muslimin (2017–present)
- Rank: Emir
- Known for: Famous preaching in central Mali
- Conflicts: Mali War: Battle of Konna; Battle of Farimake (not present); Raid on Dioura

Amadou Koufa, nom de guerre of Amadou Diallo, also spelled Hamadoun Kouffa or Amadou Kouffa (born 1961) is a Malian Fulani jihadist and preacher who founded Katiba Macina, later part of Jama'at Nasr al-Islam wal Muslimin.

== Early life and preaching ==
Diallo was born around 1961 in Saraféré, Niafunké Cercle, Tombouctou Region, Mali. He came from a poor family (a "little noble", a Bary) as the son of an imam who did not have a positive maraboutic lineage. Diallo's nickname, Koufa, came as a result of his village. As a child, he was known for his singing, and traveled Mopti region with custom songs for clients or to serenade girls. He conducted Islamic training in Bankass Cercle for several years, and later the Inner Niger Delta.

Koufa then became a preacher, preaching in Pakistan and Mauritania. In the 1990s, Koufa became close with the Dawah sect of Islam, meeting Iyad Ag Ghaly in the 2000s. Koufa traveled the Macina Cercle shortly afterward following Ghaly's teachings, and advocated for a revitalization of Islam. It was during this time that Koufa joined the Tablighi Jamaat movement and gravitated away from traditional Sufi-Maliki beliefs and into Salafism.

Koufa called for an Islamic Republic in Mali, and became immensely popular in central Mali. Malian anthropologist Boukary Sangaré stated that Koufa and other jihadists in the region "[spoke] of liberation, emancipation and development, which attracted pastoralists and other marabouts. Koufa's preaching began a social revolution in central Mali, both against the Malian state and traditional feudalist Fulani community and social structures.

Koufa's mass popularity and radicalization came at a time when the Malian National Assembly codified the Code on Persons in Family into law on August 3, 2009, which rejected the secularity of marriages and the minimum age of marriage.

== Mali War ==
When the Mali War began in 2012, Koufa joined Ghaly's Ansar Dine. Following the conquest of northern Mali by Tuareg rebel groups in early 2012, Koufa was spotted in Timbuktu. Between July and December 2012, he received his first and only military training there. He also negotiated with the Malian army in returning Malian hostages from Kidal and Tessalit. Koufa also fought in the battle of Konna in January 2013. Had the jihadists won the battle, Koufa would've been designated Emir of Konna.

In 2015, Koufa returned to central Mali, founding Katiba Macina, which was active in Mopti Region and parts of Ségou Region. While he was de jure leader of the group, he was more of a spiritual guide than a military decision-maker. In a 2016 audio snippet, Koufa urged Katiba Macina and his followers to avoid attacking doctors, teachers, and Christians, and instead focus their efforts on the French army, Malian Army, and MINUSMA.

He very quickly acquired a certain notoriety among young Fulani people. [Between] 1990-2000, recordings of his sermons were sold out. [...] If he appeals to young people, it is also because his sermons and his poems, which he declaims on the radio, are all challenges to the system. Koufa denounces the hypocrisy of "aristocrats" and maraboutic families. He criticizes the begging of talibés who serve to enrich the marabouts. He points the finger at thieves or scantily-clad women. He celebrates the shepherds. More generally, he denounces - without using these words - the absence of social advancement.

— International Federation for Human Rights and Malian Association of Human Rights, on Koufa's growth in central Mali,

Koufa appeared alongside Ghaly, Djamel Okacha, Abu Hassan al-Ansari, and Abou Abderrahman El Senhadji in a video published in 2017 that marked the creation of Jama'at Nusrat al-Islam wal Muslimin, a coalition of five jihadist groups. In late 2017, Koufa sent two emissaries to prominent Fulani figure and former president of the National Assembly Prof. Alioune Nouhoum Diallo in negotiations with the Malian government between JNIM. Koufa set three demands, those being the departure of the French army, the departure of MINUSMA, and that Nouhoum Diallo would be his interlocutor.

On November 8, 2018, Koufa appeared in a new video alongside Ghaly and Okacha, on which he called all Fulani to rise up in the name of jihadism in the seven African countries where they are most populous; "Senegal, Mali, Niger, Ivory Coast, Burkina Faso, Nigeria, Ghana, and Cameroon."

== Alleged death and controversies ==
On the night between November 22 and 23, 2018, the French army attacked JNIM positions near Farimaké. The French government announced the neutralization of thirty jihadists, including the possible death of Koufa. The Malian ministry of defense confirmed Koufa's death the next day, stating he was seriously injured during the attack and died a few hours afterwards in the Wagadou Forest. Malian Prime Minister Soumeylou Boubèye Maïga stated on November 29 that Koufa's body was not in the hands of Malian authorities. French Defence Minister Florence Parly confirmed Koufa's death shortly afterward.

Abdelmalek Droukdel, the leader of Al-Qaeda in the Islamic Maghreb, stated on December 11 that Koufa was still alive, claiming he was neither killed, injured, or even present at the scene of the attack. Droukdel's claims were confirmed on February 28, 2019, when Koufa appeared in a JNIM video denying and mocking the announcement of his death. An undercover agent during the initial battle of Farimake was executed by JNIM that March.

== Post-death allegations ==
In March 2019, Koufa led an attack on Malian forces in Dioura. That November, he was sanctioned by the United States for his activities in Katiba Macina and JNIM. This was followed up with United Nations sanctions in 2020.

In late 2019, the defection of Katiba Macina fighters to the Islamic State in the Greater Sahara increased tensions between the two groups. The defectors accused Koufa of being subservient to Ghaly, and not distributing spoils of war equally. These tensions culminated in a war between JNIM and ISGS, with violent fighting taking place in Mopti Region. On May 7, 2020, the Islamic State's propaganda branch Al-Naba accused Koufa and Ghaly of being apostates for negotiating with the Malian government.

The Malian government announced continued dialogue with Koufa and Ghaly in 2021, which was still continuing in 2023.

Koufa denounced the Malian Army's massacres of over two hundred people in Moura in March 2022, claiming only thirty jihadists were present in the town at the time of the massacre. In the same statement, Koufa claimed that JNIM did not kill anybody in the Diallassagou massacre that June.
