= Ersane massacre =

- Part of Kidal offensive in the Mali War
- Location: Ersane, Bourem Cercle, Gao Region, Mali
- Date: October 5, 2023
- Target: Civilians
- Deaths: 17
- Perpetrators: Malian Armed Forces; Wagner Group

On October 5, 2023, mercenaries from the Wagner Group and soldiers of the Malian Armed Forces massacred 17 people at the village of Ersane, Gao Region, Mali amid a military offensive against Jama'at Nusrat al-Islam wal-Muslimin.

== Background ==
The Russian paramilitary Wagner Group began its intervention in Mali to support the Malian government in 2022 against the al-Qaeda affiliate Jama'at Nusrat al-Islam wal-Muslimin and the Azawad Liberation Front. Since the start of its intervention, it has been accused of the massacres of civilians who they claim support JNIM and other groups. In mid-October, the Malian government and Wagner embarked on their Kidal offensive, where they sought to capture the city of Kidal and capital of the titular region, which had been under Tuareg rebel control since 2015. Throughout the offensive, Malian and Wagner forces slaughtered dozens of civilians. In September, 14 herders were killed at Ndoupa by Malian and Wagner soldiers.

== Massacre ==
Ersane is located halfway between Gao and Kidal, near Bourem in rural Gao Region. As the Malian and Wagner troops were headed towards Kidal, they were harassed by Strategic Framework for the Defense of the People of Azawad (CSP) militants. The Malian and Wagner soldiers took out their anger on the civilian population in Ersane, rounding up men in the village square and killing the civilians summary execution-style. Local sources and media said all of the victims were beheaded, and only two of the seventeen bodies were not rigged with explosives.

The Ersane massacre was considered to be one of the worst massacres of the Kidal offensive. The Malian government has denied any wrongdoing in the massacre.
