= Raid on Dioura (2023) =

2023 battle of the Mali War

- Part of Mali War
| Date | September 28, 2023 |
| Location | Dioura, Mali |
| Result | CSP-PSD victory |

Belligerents
| Mali | CSP-PSD: MNLA; HCUA; MAA; GATIA (al-Mahmoud faction) |

Casualties and losses
| 89–98 killed 5 prisoners 15 vehicles destroyed 5 vehicles captured | 5 killed 10 injured |

On September 28, 2023, rebels from the CSP-PSD attacked Malian bases in Dioura, Mali.

== Background ==
Since the start of 2023, tensions had intensified between the Malian junta that took power in 2021 and the allied Wagner Group mercenaries against the Permanent Strategic Framework for Peace, Security, and Development (CSP-PSD), a coalition of the former rebel Coordination of Azawad Movements (CMA) and the pro-government Platform militias. Malian and Wagner forces attacked the town of Ber in August 2023, the first major clashes between the two groups since the signing of the Algiers Accords in 2015. CSP-PSD spokesmen denounced the attack, and stated that retaliation would occur. The CSP-PSD then declared war on the Malian junta, and attacked Malian forces in Bourem and Léré.

== Attack ==
CSP-PSD forces attacked the camp at Dioura on the evening of September 28. The CSP-PSD and CMA claimed that they had seized control of the camp at Dioura after two hours of fighting, and withdrew from the area around midnight after seizing lots of ammunition, weaponry, and equipment. French media Le Monde and RFI confirmed the CSP-PSD's seizure of the camp at Dioura.

The Malian Army reported during the evening of September 28 that there was a "complex terrorist attack", "kamikaze" in nature, on the camp in Dioura, but did not give any further details. The army also claimed to have sent reinforcements and destroyed a column of the attackers' vehicles, which the CSP-PSD denied.

== Aftermath ==
The Malian Army did not publish any information regarding the outcome of the attack at Dioura. The CSP-PSD published two conflicting press releases on September 30; CSP-PSD spokesman Mohamed Elmaouloud Ramadane announced that ninety-eight Malian soldiers were killed in the attack, dozens were injured, and five soldiers were taken prisoner and released shortly afterward. A second report published by Colonel Moulay Ag Sidi Mola announced a toll of eighty-one Malian soldiers killed, five prisoners, five vehicles captured, and fifteen other vehicles destroyed. Sidi Mola stated five CSP-PSD fighters were killed and ten others were injured.
