= Ténenkou =

- Commune and village
- Location in Mali
- Coordinates: 14°27′20″N 4°55′5″W
- Country: Mali
- Region: Mopti Region
- Cercle: Ténenkou Cercle

Population (2009)
  - Total: 11,310
- Time zone: UTC+0 (GMT)

Ténenkou (or Tenenkou; Fula: Teenengu) is a village and commune and seat of the Ténenkou Cercle in the Mopti Region of Mali. In 2009 the commune had a population of 11,310.

The market that is held in the village on Thursdays serves many settlements in the surrounding region.

== Politics ==
Mamadou Cisse became the mayor of Tenenkou in 2004 as part of the Union for the Republic and Democracy. In 2023, Allaye Abdramane Cisse succeeded him.

== History ==
Katiba Macina attacked the town in January 2015, but was repelled by Malian forces. Tenenkou was also the site of a short battle between the Malian army and the Coordination of Azawad Movements on May 5, 2015, which the Malian army defended against again.
