= Dioura =

- Village
- Location in Mali
- Coordinates: 14°49′31″N 5°15′5″W
- Country: Mali
- Region: Mopti Region
- Cercle: Ténenkou Cercle
- Commune: Karéri
- Time zone: UTC+0 (GMT)

Dioura is a village and seat of the commune of Karéri in the Cercle of Ténenkou in the Mopti Region of southern-central Mali.

== History ==
On 17 March 2019, gunmen attacked a Malian army base in Dioura, killing at least sixteen soldiers.

On 30 September 2023, the Permanent Strategic Framework claimed responsibility for an attack in Dioura, claiming that they captured Dioura's military base after two hours of fighting. The rebels initially claimed to have killed 98 soldiers, however this figure was later revised to 81.

Another attack by JNIM militants occurred on 23 May 2025, when they temporarily took control of the nearby military base. During the attack, 41 soldiers died. Another attack by militants occurred on June 18th.
