= Katiba Macina =

Militant group in Mali

- Leader: Amadou Koufa
- Dates active: January 2015 – March 2017; November 2018 – present
- Active regions: Mali
- Ideology: • Sunni Islamism • Jihadism
- Size: 3,000
- Part of: Ansar Dine
- Wars: Islamist insurgency in the Sahel: JNIM-ISGS war

The Katiba Macina, also known as the Macina Liberation Movement or Macina Liberation Front (MLF, French: Force de libération du Macina), is a militant Islamist group that operates in Mali. It is an affiliate of Ansar Dine.

== Origins and membership ==
In March 2012, the President of Mali Amadou Toumani Touré was ousted in a coup d'état over his handling of an insurgency in Northern Mali. As a consequence of the instability that followed, Mali's three largest northern cities—Kidal, Gao and Timbuktu—were overrun by a mixture of Islamists and Tuareg Nationalists. By July, the Tuareg were pushed out by their former allies, and the area became dominated by Jihadist groups: Al-Qaeda in the Islamic Maghreb (AQIM), Ansar Dine, and the Movement for Oneness and Jihad in West Africa (MUJAO).

In January 2013, the Islamists captured the town of Konna in Central Mali, after fierce fighting with Malian forces. They were driven out by French forces days later, the start of a French-led military intervention known as Operation Serval. However, some fighters were able to retreat to hideouts in the mountains or deserts and regroup. Ethnic Fulani veterans of the conflict make up the core of the group. The Fulani are around 9 percent of Mali's population, but are locally dominant in the Mopti Region, which was the center of the 19th Century Fulani-led Islamic state of Macina.

== History ==
Katiba Macina first came to prominence in January 2015, when it claimed responsibility for attacks in central and southern Mali. The group's leader is Amadou Kouffa, a marabout who had acted as commander for the Islamist militants in the 2013 Battle of Konna.

The group has been responsible for attacks targeting United Nations peacekeepers, French troops and Malian government forces, as well as civilians.

In March 2017, Amadou Kouffa appeared in a video, alongside leaders from the Saharan branch of AQIM, Al-Mourabitoun and Ansar Dine, in which it was announced that they were merging their organisations into a group called Jama'at Nasr al-Islam wal Muslimin.

Kouffa was reportedly killed by the French Army in November 2018. In February 2019, however, France 24 reported it had obtained a 19-minute long video that appeared to show him alive.

== Links with other groups ==
On 10 January 2020, armed clashes took place between loyal members of Amadou Koufa and some dissidents near the commune of Dogo within Katiba Macina. Several points of disagreement have led a faction of dissidents affiliated with Mamadou Mobbo to criticize Amadou Kouffa for the mismanagement of natural resources. Two combatants of Katiba Macina were killed as a result of these confrontations.

Mamadou Mobbo is one of those who helped Amadou Koufa to legitimize his fight in Macina, a region where Koufa is not originally from.

In a video published at the end of January, the group of combatants led by Mamadou Mobbo defected by pledging allegiance to the Islamic State and its Caliphate Abu Ibrahim al-Hachimi al-Qourachi, thereby seeking recognition for the Islamic State.
