= Ténenkou Cercle =

Ténenkou
- Cercle
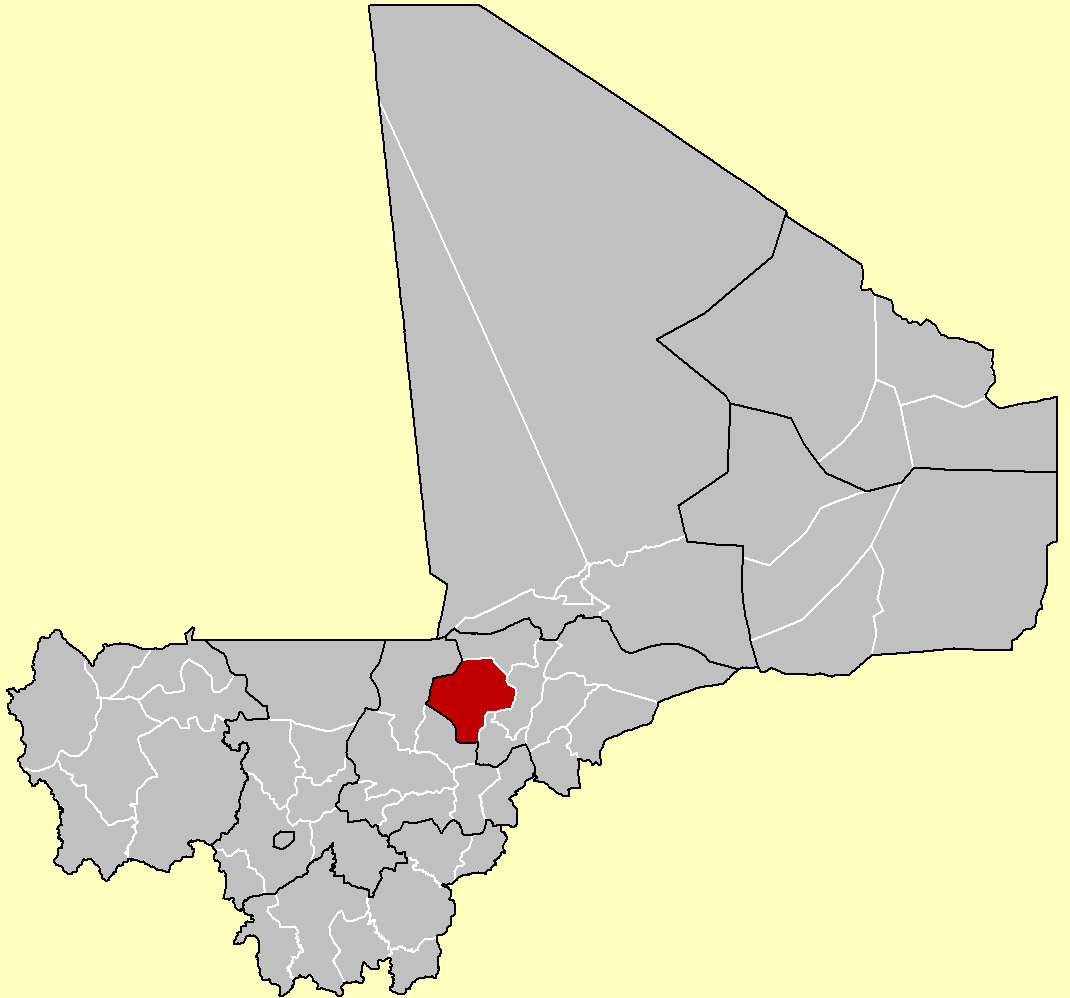
- Location of the Cercle of Ténenkou in Mali

- Location within Mali Location within Africa
- Coordinates: 14°40′N 5°00′W
- Country: Mali
- Region: Mopti Region
- Admin HQ (Chef-lieu): Ténenkou

Area
  - Total: 11,297 km^{2} (4,362 sq mi)

Population (2009 census)
  - Total: 163,641
  - Density: 14.485/km^{2} (37.517/sq mi)
- Time zone: UTC+0 (GMT)

Ténenkou Cercle is an administrative subdivision of the Mopti Region of Mali. Its seat is the town of Ténenkou, which is also its largest town. The cercle is divided into communes.

Ténenkou Cercle contains the following ten communes:

- Diafarabé
- Diaka
- Diondiori
- Karéri
- Ouro Ardo
- Ouro Guiré
- Sougoulbé
- Ténenkou
- Togoro Kotia
- Toguéré Coumbé
