= Timeline of the Mali War =

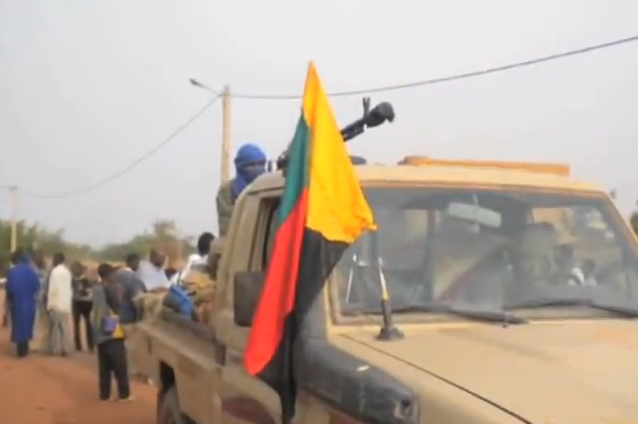
A Tuareg fighter aims a machine gun in northern Mali

The following is a timeline of major events during the Mali War.

== 2012 ==
Map of the 2012-2013 Azawad offensive

January

- 16–17 January: Battle of Menaka between the National Movement for the Liberation of Azawad (MNLA) and the army of Mali. On the 17th, fighting spread to towns of Aguelhok and Tessalit.
- 24 January: Battle of Aguelhok between the MNLA (and possibly Islamist groups like Al-Qaeda in the Islamic Maghreb and Movement for Oneness and Jihad in West Africa) and the army of Mali. When they surrendered, 97 members of the army of Mali were killed.

February

- 1 February: After regaining the town of Ménaka after the battle in January, the military of Mali retreats and the MNLA takes the town over.
- 2 February: Large-scale protests against the violence in the north take place in Bamako, the capital of Mali, and cause disruptions and shut down much of the city.

March

- 5 March: Units of the military of Mali fail to end the siege of the military garrison in Tessalit that had existed for weeks.
- 10 March: Spiritual leaders in Mali issue a call for peace.
- 12 March: The MNLA (and allies) take over Tessalit.
- 14 March: Rebel forces took control of the towns of Diré and Goundam.
- 21 March: soldiers dissatisfied with the course of the conflict attacked Defense Minister Sadio Gassama as he arrived to speak to them at the Kati military camp.
- 21–22 March: 2012 Malian coup d'état, disgruntled soldiers took over the capital city and on the morning of the 22nd, Amadou Konare went on state television, which identified him as the spokesperson of the National Committee for the Restoration of Democracy and State (CNRDR), formed by the renegade soldiers. Konare declared that the soldiers had seized power from 'the incompetent regime of Amadou Toumani Touré' and said it would look to hand over power to a new, democratically elected government. The coup was "unanimously condemned" by the international community,
- 30 March: Rebels captured Kidal and Ansongo and Bourem in Gao Region.
- 31 March: Rebels take over Gao.

April

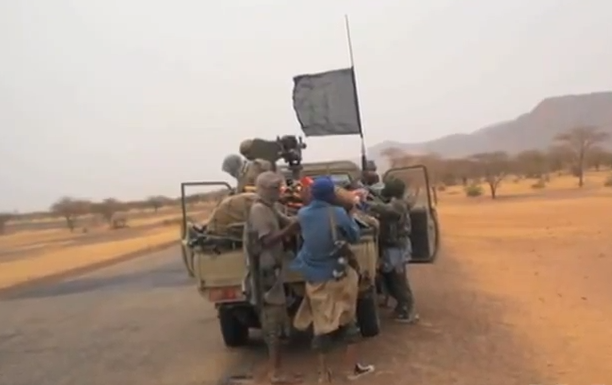
Islamist fighters in northern Mali

- 1 April: Rebels attack Timbuktu Reports that Ansar Dine takes over the city and chases away MNLA fighters.
- 2 April: ECOWAS and Mauritanian and Algeria place wide-ranging sanctions on the military government of Mali.
- 3 April: Armed groups looted 2,354 tons of food from United Nations' World Food Programme's warehouses in Kidal, Gao and Timbuktu, causing the WFP to suspend its operations in northern Mali.
- 4 April: Civil society and 50 political parties in Mali refuse to take part in a discussion with the military government on plans for the future.
- 5 April: Islamists, possibly from AQIM or MOJWA, entered the Algerian consulate in Gao and took hostages.
- 6 April: The MNLA declares independence of the northern part of Mali.
- 8 April: The National Liberation Front of Azawad (FNLA) announced its formation and intention to oppose Tuareg rule, battle the MNLA, and "return to peace and economic activity"; the group claimed to consist of 500 fighters.
- 8 April: President Amadou Toumani Touré resigns and Dioncounda Traoré is named interim President.

May

- 4 May: Ansar Dine members reportedly burned the tomb of a Sufi saint.
- 14 May: Protesters and the MNLA clashed in the city of Gao, reportedly injuring four and killing one.
- 26 May: MNLA and Ansar Dine agree to merge and create an independent state together. This alliance falls apart days later.

June

- 8 June: MNLA and Ansar Dine forces fight with one another in Kidal, killing two in the skirmish, as a result of protests in the city opposed to the imposition of Sharia law.
- 26–27 June: Battle of Gao started when protesters opposed to Tuareg rule by the MNLA resulted in two deaths (allegedly by MNLA forces). MNLA and MOJWA began fighting in the city of Gao, resulting in an injury to Bilal ag Acherif, the MNLA Secretary General, and a retreat of MNLA from the city and others.
- 29 June: Islamists are in charge of most of northern Mali and the MNLA holds few cities.
- 30 June: Destruction of tombs in Timbuktu by Islamist forces.

July

- 29 July: A couple was stoned to death by Islamists in Aguelhok for having children outside of marriage.

August

- 9 August: Islamist militants chopped off the hand of an alleged thief in the town of Ansongo, despite a crowd pleading with the militants for mercy.

September

- 1 September: MOJWA takes over the southern town of Douentza, which had previously been held by a Songhai secular militia, the Ganda Iso
- 8 September: Malian soldiers detained 17 unarmed Tablighi preachers from Mauritania in Dogofry (north of Diabaly) while en route to a religious conference in Bamako and executed all but one of them without reporting to their own command. The Malian government expressed its condolences for the incident, which Associated Press considered a symptom of the disintegration reached by the Malian Army as a result of the 21 March Coup.
- 24 September: A group broke off from the MNLA, calling itself the Front for the Liberation of the Azawad (FPA), aiming to focus efforts on fighting the Islamists.

October

- 12 October: United Nations Security Council unanimously passes United Nations Security Council Resolution 2071 which approved the creation of the African-led International Support Mission to Mali (AFISMA).

November

- 11 November: Economic Community of West African States (ECOWAS) authorizes 3,000 troops for involvement in AFISMA.
- 16 November: MNLA forces launch an offensive against Gao, but fail to retake the town.
- 19 November: MOJWA and AQIM forces took over the eastern town of Ménaka, which had previously been held by the MNLA.

December

- 11 December: Prime Minister Cheick Modibo Diarra is forced to resign by the military.
- 20 December: The United Nations Security Council passes United Nations Security Council Resolution 2085 which approved the deployment of AFISMA and international action.

== 2013 ==
January

- 4 January: A ceasefire between Ansar Dine and the army of Mali is ended by Ansar Dine claiming the terms were not met.
- 10 January: Islamist forces captured the strategic town of Konna, located 600 km from the capital.
- 11 January: France launched Opération Serval, militarily intervening in the conflict. The operation included the use of Gazelle helicopters from the Special forces, which stopped an Islamist column advancing to Mopti, and the use of four Mirage 2000-D jets of the Armée de l'Air operating from a base in Chad. 12 targets were hit by the Mirages during the night between the 11th and the 12th.
- 12 January: the British government announced that it was deploying two Royal Air Force C-17 transport planes in a non-combat role to ferry primarily French but also potentially African forces into Mali.
- 14 January: Islamists attacked the city of Diabaly from the Mauritanian border where they fled to avoid the airstrikes. The AQIM leader known as Abu Zeid was leading the operation.
- 16 January: The prosecutor of the International Criminal Court opened a formal investigation of alleged war crimes in Mali.
- 16–19 January: In Amenas hostage crisis. AQIM militants crossed the border from Mali into Algeria and captured an Algerian/Statoil/BP-owned natural gas field, In Aménas, near the border with Libya.
- 14–21 January: Battle of Diabaly begins with the Malian army, and possibly French special forces, fighting against Islamists in the city of Diabaly. Islamists retreated from the city by 18 January and the Malian military and French forces retook the city on 21 January without resistance.
- 18 January: Malian army reclaims control of Konna without resistance.
- 19 January: Residents of Gao had lynched Aliou Toure, a prominent Islamist leader and the MOJWA police commissioner of the city, in retaliation for the killing of a local journalist, Kader Toure.
- 19 January: Human Rights Watch report killings and other human rights abuses committed by the Malian army in the central Malian town of Niono. Tuaregs and Arabs were especially targeted.
- 19 January: Two Nigerian soldiers were killed and five were injured by Islamists near the Nigerian town of Okene as they were heading toward Mali.
- 25–27 January: Second Battle of Gao

February

- 9–11 February: 3rd battle of Gao
- 19 February–25 March: Operation Panther
- 20–23 February: 4th battle of Gao
- 22 February: Battle of Ifoghas
- 22–23 February: Battle of Khalil
- 27 February: Battle of Iminenas

March

- 6 March: Battle of Tin Keraten
- 12 March: Battle of Tigharghar
- 12–17 March: Battle of Djebok
- 20–21 March: Battle of Timbuktu
- 24 March: 5th Battle of Gao
- 29–30 March: Battle of In Arab
- 30 March – 1 April: Second Battle of Timbuktu

April

- 12 April: 2013 Kidal suicide attack

May

- 4 May: Battle of Hamakouladji

October

- 23 October: civilians and 2 peacekeepers killed.

== 2014 ==
January

- 17 January: A Chadian MINUSMA peacekeeper was killed in an attack on a French-UN camp in Kidal.

June

- 11 June: a car bomb killed four Chadian peacekeepers in Aguelhok.

September

- 18 September: five Chadian MINUSMA peacekeepers were killed by a land mine. The Chadian government described the incident as "discriminatory" and said its soldiers were being used as "shields".

October

- 23 October: Two Chadian peacekeepers were killed in an attack in Tessalit.

== 2015 ==
March

- 7 March: Gunmen attacked a restaurant in Bamako, killing five.

May

- Tuareg-led rebels and government forces clashed, despite peace negotiations.

June

- 20 June: The CMA signed the Algiers Peace Accord, which intended to end hostilities in northern Mali.

August

- 7 August: Militants attacked a hotel in Sévaré, killing civilians, soldiers and foreign contractors.

November

- 20 November: Militants took 170 hostages at the Radisson Blu Hotel in Bamako.

== 2016 ==
January

- 15 January: Gunmen attacked both a hotel and coffeehouse in Burkina Faso, killing thirty.

February

- 13 February: Five UN peacekeepers killed by an attack on the MINUSMA camp in Kidal.

May-June

- 31 May-1 June: Militants coordinated attacks on UN bases, killing several.

July

- 19 July: Militants attacked a Malian military base in Nampala, killing 17 soldiers.

== 2017 ==
May

- 5 May: A rocket hit a MINUSMA base killing a Liberian soldier and injuring 7 other soldiers, including several Liberians and a Swedish soldier.

June

- 18 June: Jama'at Nasr al-Islam wal Muslimin Islamists attacked a luxury resort in Bamako killing 5 people, including one Portuguese soldier. 6 attackers were also killed in the shooting and hostage-taking.

July

- 26 July: 2 German pilots died in a helicopter-crash.

== 2018 ==
- 11 January: Three French soldiers of the Barkhane force were wounded, one of them seriously, by a suicide bomber in eastern Mali.
- 24 January: Two Malian customs officers have been killed in a suspected jihadist attack at a market in the small village of Toubakoro.
- 1 July:
  - Four French soldiers are wounded near Bourem when two VBCIs are hit by suicide bombers. Four civilians were also killed.
  - A vehicle carrying several MSA fighters hit an explosive device, probably a mine, in the centre of the village of Talataye in the Ansongo Cercle of the Malian Gao region. Six fighters were killed and another injured in the incident.
  - A suicide bomber drove a vehicle loaded with explosives into an army patrol and detonated it in the Malian city of Gao. Four civilians were killed and 31 others, including four French soldiers, wounded in the attack.

== 2019 ==
- 23 March: Ogossagou massacre
- 10 June: Sobane Da massacre

== 2020 ==
- 9 January: Twenty people, including eighteen U.N. peacekeepers, were wounded following a rocket attack on a MINUSMA base in Tessalit, Kidal Region.
- 26 January: A Malian Armed Forces camp in Sokolo, Niono Cercle was attacked, leading to the deaths of 19 Malian soldiers.
- 29 January: Prime Minister Boubou Cisse announced his intention to hire 10,000 new soldiers for the Malian Armed Forces in order to combat jihadist groups.
- 13 February: A "reconstituted" battalion of the Armed Forces of Mali, incorporating former rebel soldiers, arrived at Kidal, becoming the first government soldiers to be based in the city since March 2012. The battalion was escorted by MINUSMA forces and based at Camp General Abdoulaye Soumaré.
- 6 April: An attack on a military camp in Mali left at least 23 dead, while several others injured. The Malian News Agency reported that the incident was carried out by unidentified gunmen, who took away the military equipment and also burned the camp.
- 17 May: Malian Armed Forces returned to Labbézanga after they withdrew in November 2019
- 3 June: Malian forces killed AQIM leader, Abdelmalek Droukdel in operation near Algerian border.

== 2021 ==
- 17 March: At least 33 soldiers are killed and 14 others are wounded in an attack on a military post in Gao, Mali.
- 4 July: Four Malian soldiers were killed in an ambush on their patrol near the town of Léré. No group claimed responsibility for the attack, which came as France resumed joint military exercises with members of the Malian Armed Forces, which had been suspended following the coup d'état that year led by Colonel Assimi Goïta.
- 30 December: Mali's army announced 8 soldiers had died and 7 had been wounded during an attack in Sahel this day. They also said 31 assailants were also killed but did not identify the group.

== 2022 ==
- 22 January: A French soldier was killed and nine were injured in a mortar attack on Barkhane military camp in Gao, northern Mali.
- March: government forces set siege to the town of Mourrah. According to Human Rights Watch, over 300 civilians were massacred.
- 1 June: one Jordanian peacekeeper was killed in the town of Kidal in northern Mali.
- October: The Islamic State in the Greater Sahara took over the rural areas of Ansongo district.
- 16 December: Two Nigerian peacekeepers killed, four wounded in attack in Mali, UN says

== 2023 ==
- April: The Islamic State in the Greater Sahara capture Tidermène
- September 7: Tombouctou and Bamba attacks
- November: The Malian Army recaptured the town of Kidal from the MNLA.

== 2024 ==
- 25–27 July: Battle of Tinzaouaten between the Tuareg rebel coalition Strategic Framework for the Defense of the People of Azawad (CSP-DPA) on one side, and the Malian Armed Forces (FAMa) backed by the Wagner Group, a Russian state-funded mercenary group, on the other.
- 17 September: 2024 Bamako attacks

== 2025 ==
- 23 May 2025: JNIM militants attacked Dioura, where they raided a nearby military base. During the attack, 41 soldiers died.
- 8 September 2025: Jama'at Nasr al-Islam wal Muslimin (JNIM) imposes a nationwide blockade on fuel and other goods imported from neighboring countries while besieging Malian government-held cities and towns. An unknown number of fuel trucks from Senegal and the Ivory Coast violating JNIM's blockade have been attacked and burned by militants.
- 2 October 2025: Malian army and allied militias kill at least 21 civilians in Kamona village, Segou region.
- 5-6 October 2025: Coordinated JNIM attacks across regions: • IED attack on a military convoy in Kayes region and Fuel convoy ambushed in Sikasso region (further deepening the fuel crisis).
- 7 October 2025: Around 300 fuel tankers reach Bamako despite the blockade.
- 13 October 2025: Malian forces and Dozo militia kill at least 10 civilians in Balle village, Segou region.
- 26 October 2025: Government suspends schools and universities nationwide until 9 November due to security and fuel crisis. –
- 21 November 2025: France reduced its diplomatic staff in Mali because of the deteriorating security situation tied to the jihadist insurgency and fuel blockade.
- 20 December 2025: The Alliance of Sahel States (Mali, Burkina Faso, Niger) inaugurated a unified military force to counter jihadist insurgent groups.

== 2026 ==
- 21 or 22 March 2026: A brief truce reportedly intended to last until late May saw the release of around 100 JNIM prisoners in exchange for lifting the fuel blockade that had crippled Bamako's infrastructure since late 2025. https://www.africanews.com/2026/03/23/jihadist-prisoner-release-secures-fuel-convoy-truce-in-mali/
- 25 April 2026: 2026 Mali attacks: al-Qaeda-linked JNIM and Tuareg-led Azawad Liberation Front (FLA) launched coordinated simultaneous strikes across Mali. Defense Minister Sadio Camara was killed in the attacks. Later, a deal was reportedly brokered allowing Malian and Russian Africa Corps forces to withdraw from the former MINUSMA camp in Kidal under rebel escort.
- 6 October 2026: After large scale operations conducted by the Malian Armed Forces, the FLA announced that it had “decided to carry out a strategic and controlled withdrawal of its forces" from the city of Kidal. The Malian forces along with Africa corps entered the city soon after.
