= 2022 Bankass massacres =

Mass murders by Islamist insurgents in Mali

- Part of the War in the Sahel and the Mali War
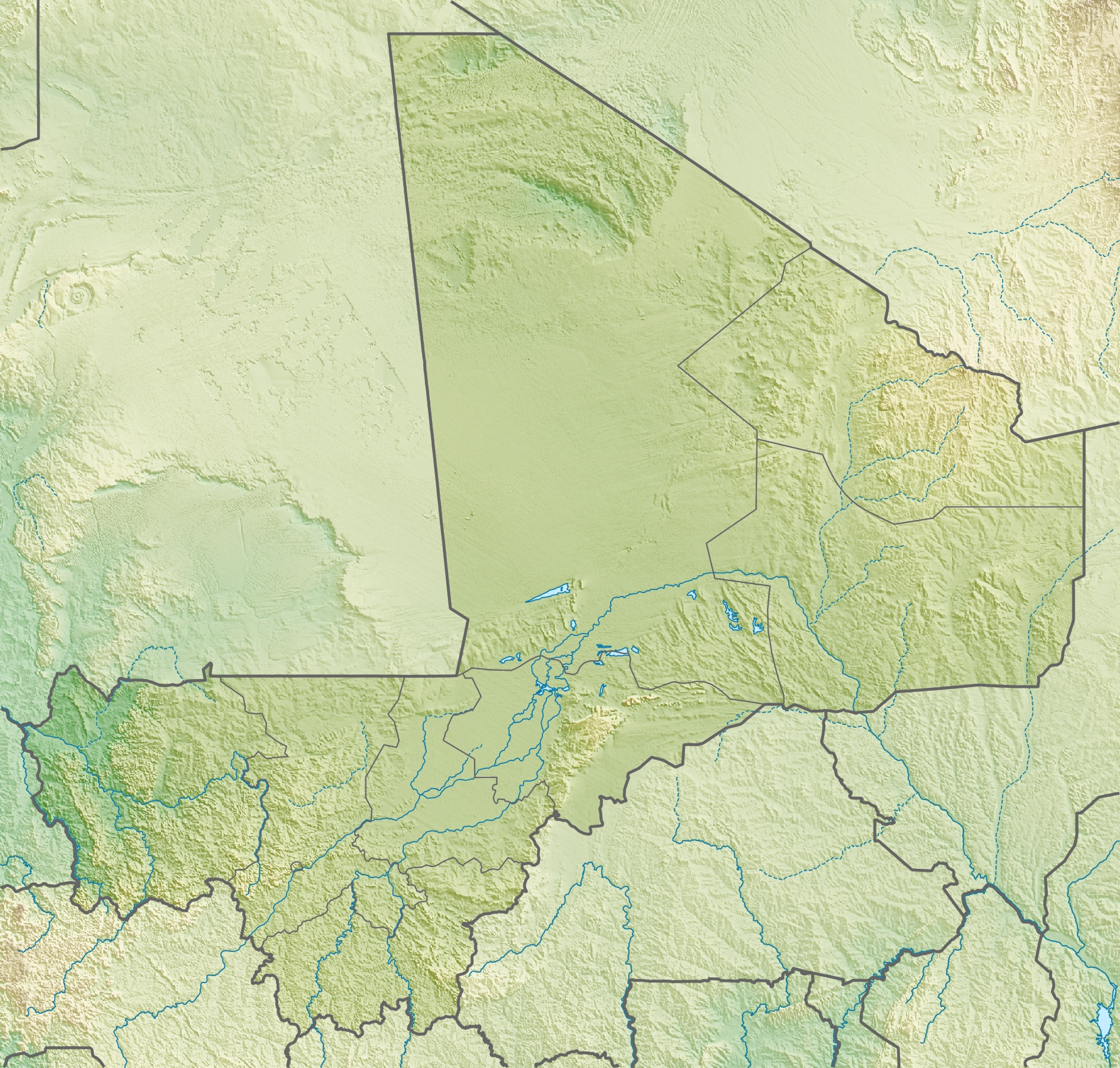
- 2022 Bankass massacres (Mali) 2022 Bankass massacres (Africa)
- Location: 13°44′26″N 3°37′34″W; Diallassagou and nearby villages, Bankass Cercle, Mopti Region, Mali
- Date: 18–19 June 2022
- Target: Dogon people
- Weapon: Automatic firearms
- Deaths: 132
- Perpetrator: Macina Katiba
- Motive: Jihad, Islamism, nomadic conflict

On 18 and 19 June 2022, 132 civilians were killed by Islamist insurgents in Bankass Cercle, Mopti Region, Mali.

== Background ==
During the early 2010s, an Islamist insurgency in the Sahel and the Mali War began. Massacres in central Mali's Mopti Region have included those in Ogossagou in March 2019, Sobane Da in June 2019 and Bankass in December 2021. The violence is also linked to nomadic conflict, with the farming Dogon people (who mostly practice traditional religion) contesting water and land with the nomadic Fula, who are mostly Muslims.

== Massacres ==
During 18 and 19 June 2022, a group of militants speaking Fula killed 132 civilians in Diallassagou and two surrounding towns in Bankass Cercle, Mopti Region. The insurgents also burned huts and houses, and stole cattle.

The government says that the perpetrators were Macina Katiba, an al-Qaeda-affiliated jihadist group headed by Fulani preacher Amadou Kouffa, which was established in 2015.

== See also ==
- List of massacres in Mali
