= Persecution =

Systematic mistreatment of an individual or group by another individual or group

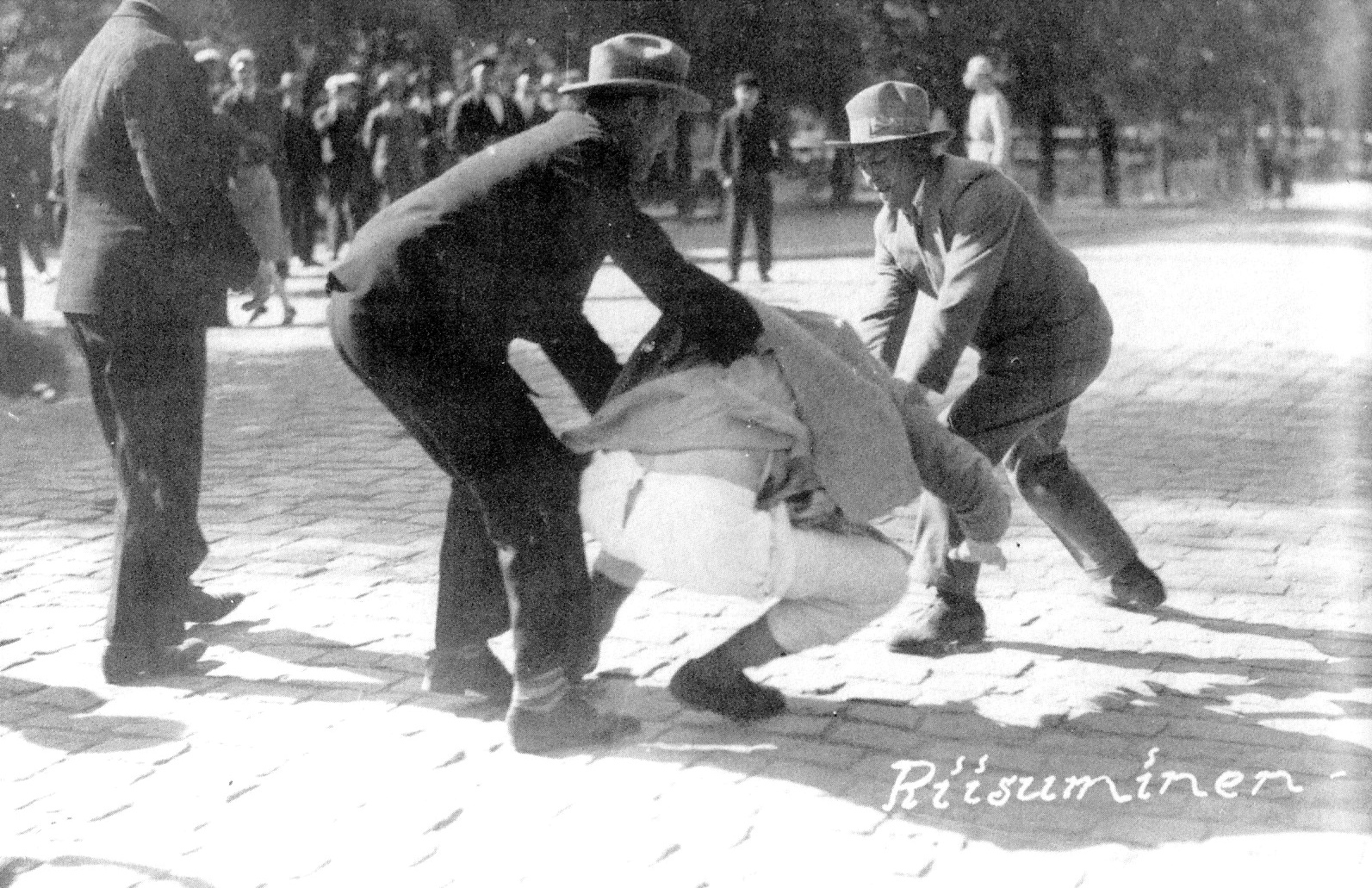
Members of the right-wing Lapua Movement assault a former Red officer and the publisher of the communist newspaper at the Vaasa riot on June 4, 1930, in Vaasa, Finland.

Persecution is the mistreatment specifically directed at an individual or group by another individual or group. The most common forms are religious persecution, racism, and political persecution. The inflicting of suffering, harassment, imprisonment, internment, fear or pain are all factors that may establish persecution, but not all suffering will necessarily establish persecution. The threshold of severity has been a topic of much debate. Jeremy Adler has proposed the radical view that the West can be understood as a "persecutory civilization" in his article in The London Journal of Research in the Humanities and Social Sciences Volume 24 Issue 8 Compilation 10.

== International law ==
As part of the Nuremberg Principles, crimes against humanity are part of international law. Principle VI of the Nuremberg Principles states that

The crimes hereinafter set out are punishable as crimes under international law:...

(c) Crimes against humanity:

Murder, extermination, enslavement, deportation, and other inhumane acts done against any civilian population, or persecutions on political, racial, or religious grounds, when such acts are done or such persecutions are carried on in execution of or in connection with any crime against peace or any war crime.

Telford Taylor, who was Counsel for the Prosecution at the Nuremberg Trials wrote "[at] the Nuremberg war crimes trials, the tribunals rebuffed several efforts by the prosecution to bring such 'domestic' atrocities within the scope of international law as 'crimes against humanity". Several subsequent international treaties incorporate this principle, but some have dropped the restriction "in connection with any crime against peace or any war crime" that is in Nuremberg Principles.

The Rome Statute of the International Criminal Court, which is binding on 111 states, defines crimes against humanity in Article 7.1. The article criminalizes certain acts "committed as part of a widespread or systematic attack directed against any civilian population, with knowledge of the attack". These include:

(h) Persecution against any identifiable group or collectivity on political, racial, national, ethnic, cultural, religious, gender...or other grounds that are universally recognized as impermissible under international law, in connection with any act referred to in this paragraph [e.g. murder, extermination, enslavement, deportation, imprisonment, torture, sexual violence, apartheid, and other inhumane acts] or any crime within the jurisdiction of the Court

== Religious ==
=== Baháʼís ===
The persecution of Baháʼís refers to the religious persecution of Baháʼís in various countries, especially in Iran, which has the seventh largest Baháʼí population in the world, with just over 251,100 as of 2010. The Baháʼí Faith originated in Iran, and it represents the largest religious minority in that country.

=== Buddhists ===
The persecution of Buddhists has been a widespread phenomenon throughout the history of Buddhism, a phenomenon which is continuing today. As early as the 3rd century AD, Buddhists were persecuted by Kirder, the Zoroastrian high priest of the Sasanian Empire.

Anti-Buddhist sentiment in Imperial China between the 5th and 10th century led to the Four Buddhist Persecutions in China of which the Great Anti-Buddhist Persecution of 845 was probably the most severe. However, Buddhism managed to survive in China, but it was greatly weakened. During the Northern Expedition, in 1926 in Guangxi, the Kuomintang Muslim General Bai Chongxi led his troops on a campaign to destroy Buddhist temples and smash idols, they turned the temples into schools and Kuomintang party headquarters. During the Kuomintang Pacification of Qinghai, the Muslim General Ma Bufang and his army wiped out many Tibetan Buddhists in the northeast and eastern Qinghai, and destroyed Tibetan Buddhist temples.

The Muslim invasion of the Indian subcontinent was the first great iconoclastic invasion of the Indian subcontinent. According to William Johnston, hundreds of Buddhist monasteries and shrines were destroyed, Buddhist texts were burnt by the Muslim armies, monks and nuns were killed on the Indo-Gangetic Plain during the 12th and 13th centuries. The Buddhist university of Nalanda was mistaken for a fort because of its walled campus. The Buddhist monks who had been slaughtered were mistaken for Brahmins according to Minhaj-i-Siraj. The walled town, the Odantapuri monastery, was also destroyed by his forces. Sumpa based his account on that of Śākyaśribhadra who was at Magadha in 1200, states that the Buddhist university complexes of Odantapuri and Vikramshila were also destroyed and the monks were massacred. Muslim forces attacked the north-western regions of the Indian subcontinent many times. Many places were destroyed and renamed. For example, Odantapuri's monasteries were destroyed in 1197 by Muhammad bin Bakhtiyar Khilji and the town was renamed. Likewise, Vikramashila was destroyed by the forces of Muhammad bin Bakhtiyar Khilji around 1200. The sacred Mahabodhi Temple was almost completely destroyed by the Muslim invaders. Many Buddhist monks fled to Nepal, Tibet, and South India to avoid the consequences of war. Tibetan pilgrim Chöjepal (1179-1264), who arrived in India in 1234, had to flee advancing Muslim troops multiple times, as they were sacking Buddhist sites.

In Japan, the haibutsu kishaku during the Meiji Restoration (starting in 1868) was an event which was triggered by the official policy of separation of Shinto and Buddhism (or shinbutsu bunri). This policy caused great destruction to Buddhism in Japan, the destruction of Buddhist temples, images and texts took place on a large scale all over the country and Buddhist monks were forced to return to secular life.

During the 2012 Ramu violence in Bangladesh, a 25,000-strong Muslim mob set fire to at least five Buddhist temples and dozens of homes throughout the town and throughout the surrounding villages after they saw a picture of an allegedly desecrated Quran, which they claimed had been posted on Facebook by Uttam Barua, a local Buddhist man.

=== Christians ===
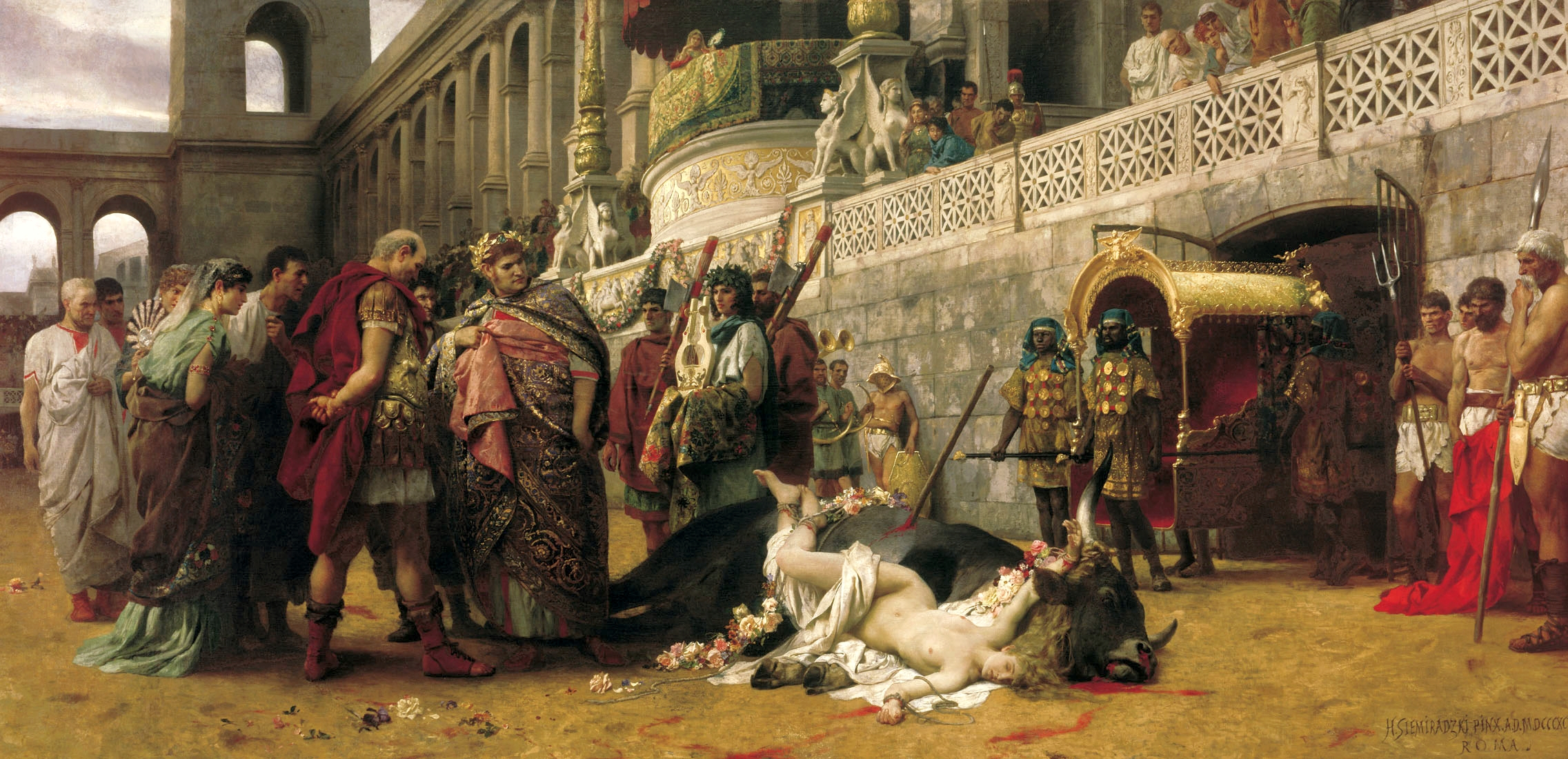
A Christian Dirce, by Henryk Siemiradzki. A Christian woman is martyred under Nero in this re-enactment of the myth of Dirce (painting by Henryk Siemiradzki, 1897, National Museum, Warsaw).

The persecution of Christians is religious persecution that Christians may be subjected to as a consequence of professing their faith, both historically and in the modern era. Early Christians were persecuted for their faith at the hands of both Jews from whose religion Christianity arose and the Roman Empire which controlled much of the land across which early Christianity was distributed. Early in the fourth century, the religion was legalized by the Edict of Milan, and it eventually became the State church of the Roman Empire.

Christian missionaries, as well as the people that they converted to Christianity, have been the target of persecution, many times to the point of being martyred for their faith.

There is also a history of individual Christian denominations suffering persecution at the hands of other Christians under the charge of heresy, particularly during the 16th century Protestant Reformation as well as throughout the Middle Ages when various Christian groups deemed heretical were persecuted by the Papacy.

In the 20th century, Christians have been persecuted by various groups, and by atheistic states such as the USSR and North Korea. During the Second World War members of many Christian churches were persecuted in Germany for resisting the Nazi ideology.

In more recent times the Christian missionary organization Open Doors (UK) estimates 100 million Christians face persecution, particularly in Muslim-dominated countries such as Pakistan and Saudi Arabia. According to the International Society for Human Rights, up to 80% of all acts of persecution are directed against people of the Christian faith.

==== Church of Jesus Christ of Latter-day Saints (Mormonism) ====
During the 1838 conflict in Missouri known as the Mormon War, tensions between members of the Church of Jesus Christ of Latter‑day Saints and non‑Mormon settlers and militia escalated into open violence. Governor Lilburn W. Boggs of Missouri issued what became known as the "Extermination Order" on October 27, 1838. The Missouri extermination order forced Mormons to move to Illinois.

The founder of the church, Joseph Smith, was killed in Carthage, Illinois by a mob of about 200 men, almost all of whom were members of the Illinois state militia including some members of the militia who were assigned to guard him. He was shot multiple times before falling out of a window, crying, "Oh Lord my God!" He died shortly after hitting the ground, but was shot several more times by an improvised firing squad before the mob dispersed. Smith was the first U.S. presidential candidate to be assassinated.

==== Jehovah's Witnesses ====
During the Nazi rule from 1933, Jehovah's Witnesses faced great persecution in Germany. Their refusal to give the Nazi salute, join Nazi organizations, perform compulsory military service, or display loyalty to the regime marked them out as nonconformists and opponents to the state ideology. They were banned from preaching and distributing literature, their homes were raided, and many members were dismissed from employment, arrested, or sent to concentration camps.

The Supreme Court of Russia has declared the organization "extremist," banned its activities, liquidated its legal entities, and ordered confiscation of property.

Jehovah's Witnesses are one of the religious groups most frequently banned worldwide, with official prohibitions or restrictions in several countries spanning Asia‑Pacific, Europe, and the Middle East–North Africa region.

=== Copts ===
The persecution of Copts is a historical and ongoing issue in Egypt against Coptic Orthodox Christianity and its followers. It is also a prominent example of the poor status of Christians in the Middle East despite the religion being native to the region. Copts are the Christ followers in Egypt, usually Oriental Orthodox, who currently make up around 10% of the population of Egypt — the largest religious minority of that country. (Note: In 2017, the Wall Street Journal reported that "the vast majority of Egypt's estimated 9.5 million Christians, approximately 10% of the country's population, are Orthodox Copts." In 2019, the Associated Press cited an estimate of 10 million Copts in Egypt. In 2015, the Wall Street Journal reported: "The Egyptian government estimates about 5 million Copts, but the Coptic Orthodox Church says 15-18 million. Reliable numbers are hard to find but estimates suggest they make up somewhere between 6% and 18% of the population." The CIA World Factbook reported a 2015 estimate that 10% of the Egyptian population is Christian (including both Copts and non-Copts).) Copts have cited instances of persecution throughout their history and Human Rights Watch has noted "growing religious intolerance" and sectarian violence against Coptic Christians in recent years, as well as a failure by the Egyptian government to effectively investigate properly and prosecute those responsible.

The Muslim conquest of Egypt took place in AD 639, during the Byzantine Empire. Despite the political upheaval, Egypt remained a mainly Christian, but Copts lost their majority status after the 14th century, as a result of the intermittent persecution and the destruction of the Christian churches there, accompanied by heavy taxes for those who refused to convert. From the Muslim conquest of Egypt onwards, the Coptic Christians were persecuted by different Muslims regimes, such as the Umayyad Caliphate, Abbasid Caliphate, Fatimid Caliphate, Mamluk Sultanate, and Ottoman Empire; the persecution of Coptic Christians included closing and demolishing churches and forced conversion to Islam.

Since 2011 hundreds of Egyptian Copts have been killed in sectarian clashes, and many homes, Churches and businesses have been destroyed. In just one province (Minya), 77 cases of sectarian attacks on Copts between 2011 and 2016 have been documented by the Egyptian Initiative for Personal Rights. The abduction and disappearance of Coptic Christian women and girls also remains a serious ongoing problem.

=== Dogons ===
For almost 1000 years, the Dogon people, an ancient tribe of Mali had faced religious and ethnic persecution—through jihads by dominant Muslim communities. These jihadic expeditions were to forced the Dogon to abandon their traditional religious beliefs for Islam. Such jihads caused the Dogon to abandon their original villages and moved up to the cliffs of Bandiagara for better defense and to escape persecution—often building their dwellings in little nooks and crannies. In the early era of French colonialism in Mali, the French authorities appointed Muslim relatives of El Hadj Umar Tall as chiefs of the Bandiagara—despite the fact that the area has been a Dogon area for centuries.

In 1864, Tidiani Tall, nephew and successor of the 19th century Senegambian jihadist and Muslim leader—El Hadj Umar Tall, chose Bandiagara as the capital of the Toucouleur Empire thereby exacerbating the inter-religious and inter-ethnic conflict. In recent years, the Dogon accused the Fulanis of supporting and sheltering Islamic terrorist groups like Al-Qaeda in Dogon country, leading to the creation of the Dogon militia Dan Na Ambassagou in 2016—whose aim is to defend the Dogon from systematic attacks. That resulted in the Ogossagou massacre of Fulanis in March 2019, and a Fula retaliation with the Sobane Da massacre in June of that year. In the wake of the Ogossagou massacre, the President of Mali, Ibrahim Boubacar Keïta and his government ordered the dissolution of Dan Na Ambassagou—whom they hold partly responsible for the attacks. The Dogon militia group denied any involvement in the massacre and rejected calls to disband.

=== Druze ===
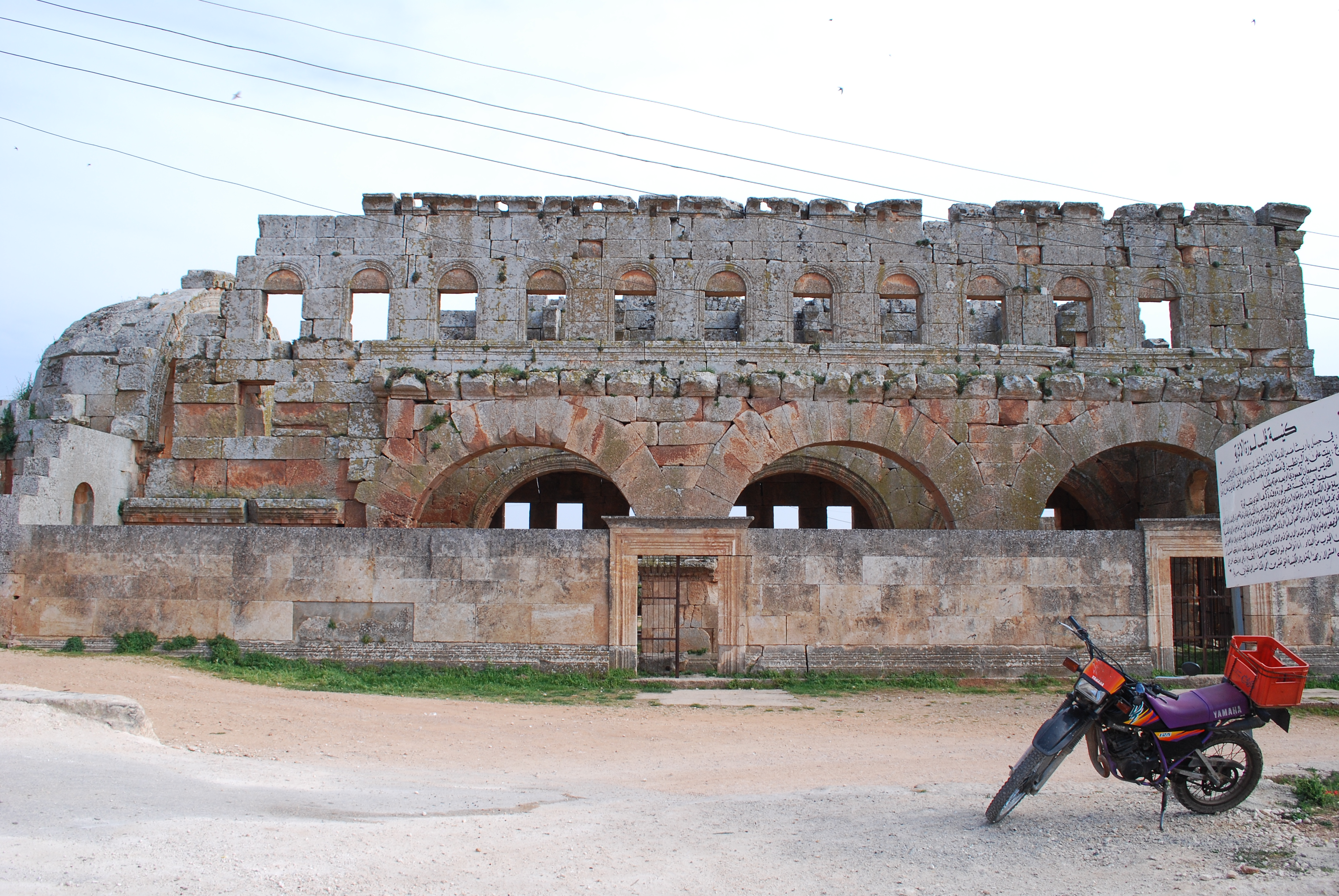
Qalb Loze: in June 2015, Druze were massacred there by the jihadist Nusra Front.

Historically the relationship between the Druze and Muslims has been characterized by intense persecution. The Druze faith is often classified as a branch of Isma'ili. Even though the faith originally developed out of Ismaili Islam, most Druze do not identify as Muslims, and they do not accept the five pillars of Islam. The Druze have frequently experienced persecution by different Muslim regimes such as the Shia Fatimid Caliphate, Mamluk, Sunni Ottoman Empire, and Egypt Eyalet. The persecution of the Druze included massacres, demolishing Druze prayer houses and holy places and forced conversion to Islam. Those were no ordinary killings in the Druze's narrative, they were meant to eradicate the whole community according to the Druze narrative. Most recently, the Syrian Civil War, which began in 2011, saw persecution of the Druze at the hands of Islamic extremists.

Ibn Taymiyya a prominent Muslim scholar muhaddith, dismissed the Druze as non-Muslims, and his fatwa cited that Druzes: "Are not at the level of ′Ahl al-Kitāb (People of the Book) nor mushrikin (polytheists). Rather, they are from the most deviant kuffār (Infidel) ... Their women can be taken as slaves and their property can be seized ... they are to be killed whenever they are found and cursed as they described ... It is obligatory to kill their scholars and religious figures so that they do not misguide others", which in that setting would have legitimized violence against them as apostates. Ottomans have often relied on Ibn Taymiyya religious ruling to justify their persecution of Druze.

=== Falun Gong ===
Falun Gong was introduced to the general public by Li Hongzhi in Changchun, China, in 1992. For the next few years, Falun Gong was the fastest growing qigong practice in Chinese history and, by 1999, there were millions of practitioners. Following the seven years of widespread popularity, on July 20, 1999, the government of the People's Republic of China began a nationwide persecution campaign against Falun Gong practitioners, except in the special administrative regions of Hong Kong and Macau. In late 1999, legislation was created to outlaw "heterodox religions" and retroactively applied to Falun Gong. Amnesty International states that the persecution is "politically motivated" with "legislation being used retroactively to convict people on politically-driven charges, and new regulations introduced to further restrict fundamental freedoms".

=== Hindus ===
Persecution of Hindus refers to the religious persecution inflicted upon Hindus that may undergo as a consequence of professing their faith, both historically and in the current era. Hindus have been brutally persecuted during the historical Islamic rule of the Indian subcontinent and during Portuguese rule of Goa.

Even in modern times, Hindus in Pakistan and Bangladesh have suffered persecution. Most recently, thousands of Hindus from Sindh province in Pakistan have been fleeing to India voicing fear for their safety. After the Partition of India in 1947, there were 8.8 million Hindus in Pakistan (excluding Bangladesh) in 1951. In 1951, Hindus constituted 1.58% of the Pakistani population. Today, the Hindu minority amounts to 1.7 percent of Pakistan's population.

The Bangladesh Liberation War (1971) resulted in one of the largest genocides of the 20th century. While estimates of the number of casualties was 3,000,000, it is reasonably certain that Hindus bore a disproportionate brunt of the Pakistan Army's onslaught against the Bengali population of what was East Pakistan. An article in Time magazine dated 2 August 1971, stated "The Hindus, who account for three-fourths of the refugees and a majority of the dead, have borne the brunt of the Muslim military hatred." Senator Edward Kennedy wrote in a report that was part of United States Senate Committee on Foreign Relations testimony dated 1 November 1971, "Hardest hit have been members of the Hindu community who have been robbed of their lands and shops, systematically slaughtered, mass rape and in some places, painted with yellow patches marked "H". All of this has been officially sanctioned, ordered and implemented under martial law from Islamabad". In the same report, Senator Kennedy reported that 80% of the refugees in India were Hindus and according to numerous international relief agencies such as UNESCO and World Health Organization the number of East Pakistani refugees at their peak in India was close to 10 million. In a syndicated column "The Pakistani Slaughter That Nixon Ignored", Pulitzer Prize–winning journalist Sydney Schanberg wrote about his return to liberated Bangladesh in 1972. "Other reminders were the yellow "H"s the Pakistanis had painted on the homes of Hindus, particular targets of the Muslim army" (by "Muslim army", meaning the Pakistan Army, which had targeted Bengali Muslims as well), (Newsday, 29 April 1994).

In Bangladesh, on 28 February 2013, the International Crimes Tribunal sentenced Delwar Hossain Sayeedi, the Vice President of the Jamaat-e-Islami to death for the war crimes committed during the 1971 Bangladesh Liberation War. Following the sentence, activists of Jamaat-e-Islami and its student wing Islami Chhatra Shibir attacked the Hindus in different parts of the country. Hindu properties were looted, Hindu houses were burnt into ashes and Hindu temples were desecrated and set on fire. The violence included the looting of Hindu properties and businesses, the burning of Hindu homes, the rape of Hindu women, and the desecration and destruction of, according to community leaders, more than 50 Hindu temples; 1,500 Hindu homes were destroyed in 20 districts. While the government has held the Jamaat-e-Islami responsible for the attacks on the minorities, the Jamaat-e-Islami leadership has denied any involvement. The minority leaders have protested the attacks and appealed for justice. The Supreme Court of Bangladesh has directed the law enforcement to start suo motu investigation into the attacks. US Ambassador to Bangladesh express concern about attack of Jamaat on Bengali Hindu community.

=== Jews ===
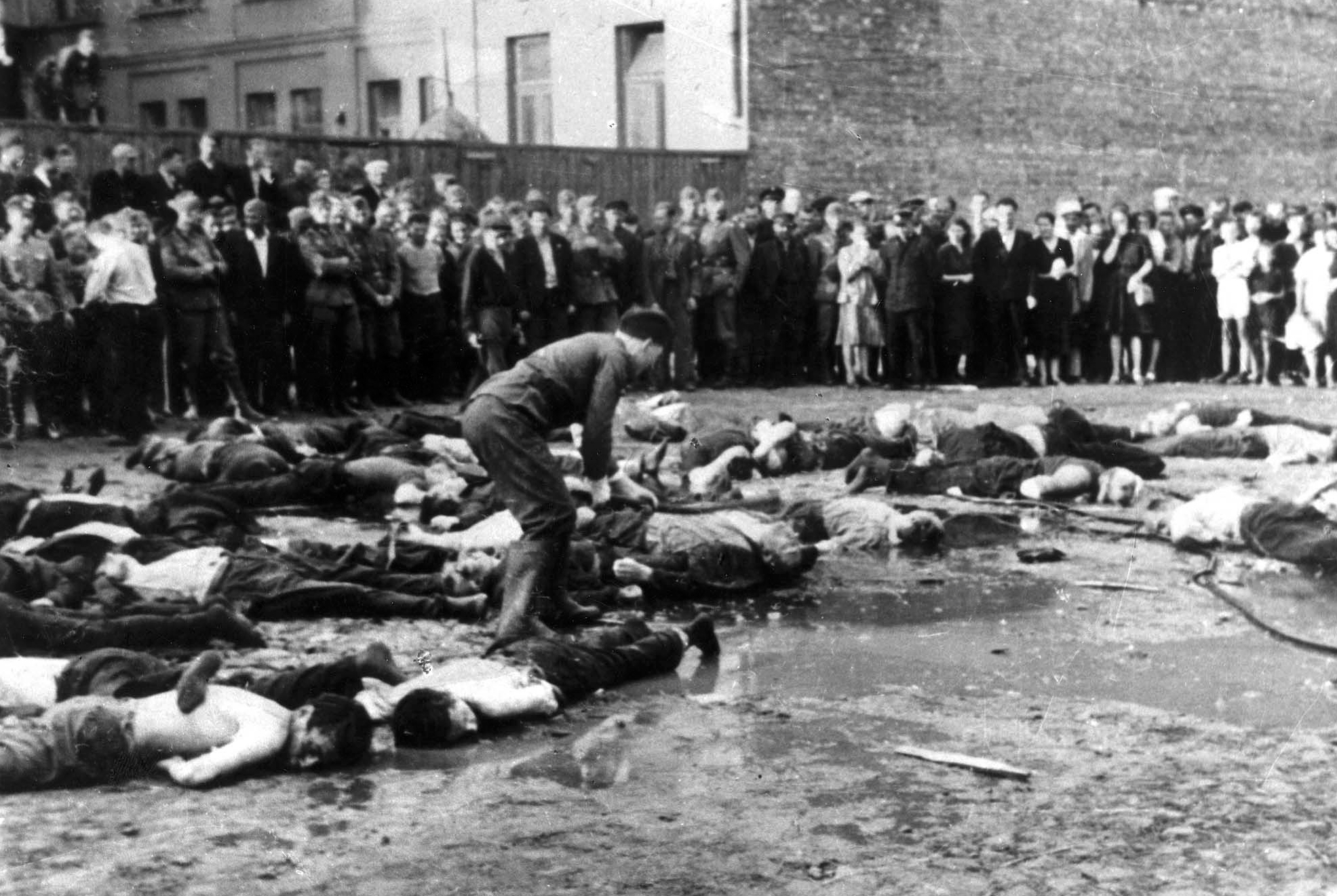
Kaunas pogrom in German-occupied Lithuania, June 1941

The persecution of Jews is a recurring phenomenon throughout Jewish history. It has occurred on numerous occasions in widely different geographic locations. It may include pogroms, looting and the demolition of private and public Jewish property (e.g., Kristallnacht), unwarranted arrest, imprisonment, torture, killing, or even mass execution (in World War II alone, approximately six million people were deliberately killed because they were Jewish). They have been expelled from their hometowns/countries, hoping to find safe havens in other polities. In recent times anti-Semitism has often been manifested as Anti-Zionism, where Anti-Zionism is a prejudice against the Jewish movement for self-determination and the right of the Jewish people to a homeland in the State of Israel. Anti-Zionism can include threats to destroy the State of Israel (or otherwise eliminate its Jewish character), unfounded and inaccurate characterizations of Israel's power in the world, and language or actions that hold Israel to a different standard than other countries.

=== Muslims ===
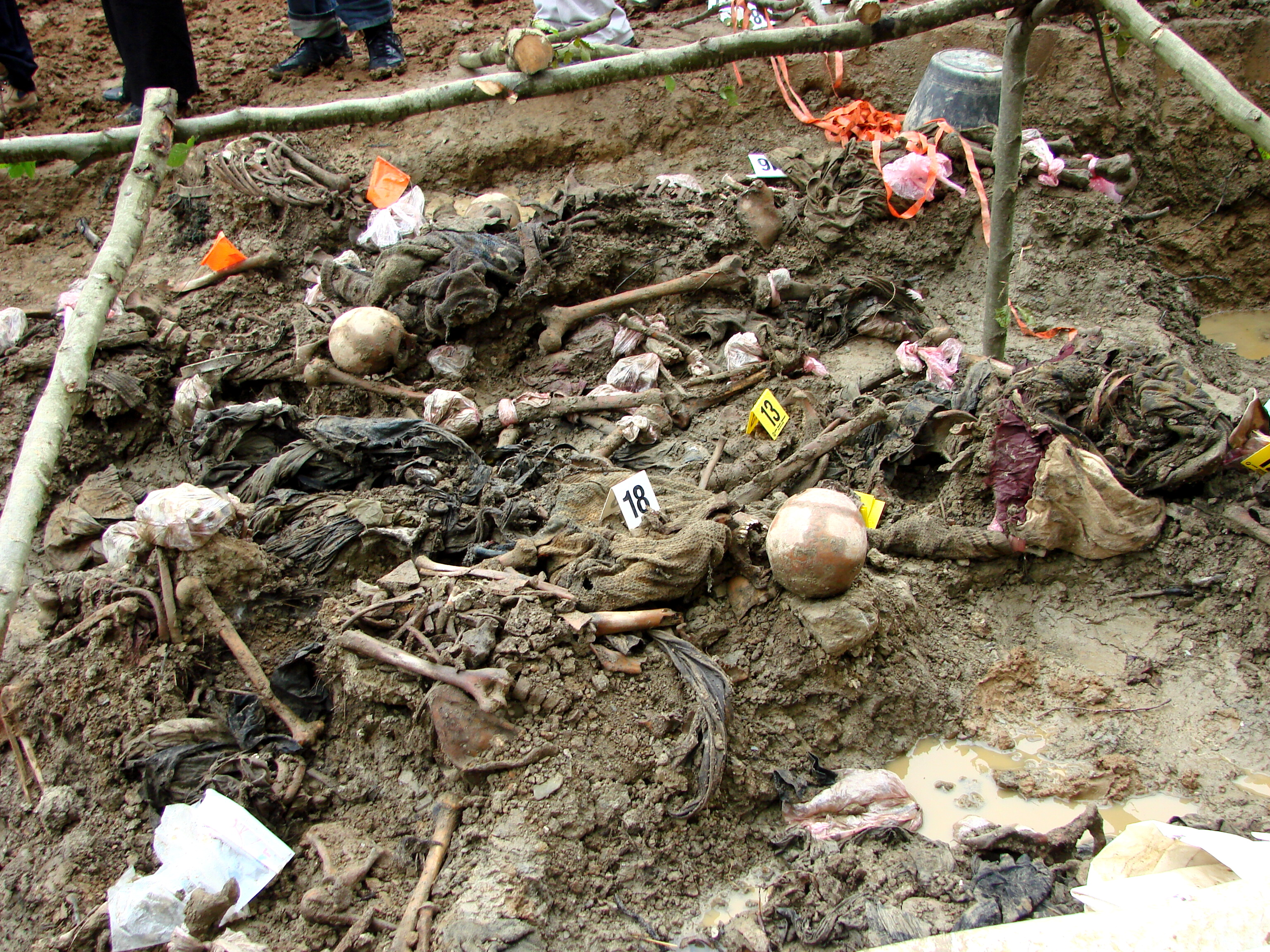
Mass grave where events of the Srebrenica massacre of Bosnian Muslims unfolded

The persecution of Muslims has been a recurring phenomenon throughout the history of Islam. Persecution may refer to unwarranted arrest, imprisonment, beatings, torture, or execution. It may also refer to the confiscation or destruction of property, or incitement to hate Muslims.

Persecution can extend beyond those who perceive themselves to be Muslims and include those who are perceived by others as Muslims, or it can include Muslims who are considered non-Muslims by fellow Muslims. The Ahmadiyya regard themselves as Muslims, but are seen by many other Muslims as non-Muslims and "heretics". In 1984, the Government of Pakistan, under General Zia-ul-Haq, passed Ordinance XX, which banned proselytizing by Ahmadis and also banned Ahmadis from referring to themselves as Muslims.

=== Pagans ===
Persecution of Pagans refers to the historical and ongoing acts of religious intolerance, violence, and oppression against followers of pagan or polytheistic religions. This persecution has been carried out by various religious and political groups, including Christians, Muslims, and governments throughout history. The rise of Christianity as a state religion in the Late Roman Empire led to the persecution of Pagans, who were seen as a threat to the new faith and persecution of pagans have continued in Post-Roman Europe, Arabia, and North Africa. The destruction and conversion of pagan temples into churches, mosques, or other structures were common practices during the Christianization of the Roman Empire and later the Spread of Islam in Middle East and North Africa. This was done to eradicate paganism and assert the dominance of Christianity and Islam. During the Age of Discovery, Many Europeans consider aspects of Native American, African Tribes, Polynesian, and Aboriginal Australian religion as pagans, which attributed to their genocide and forced conversions. Some notable examples are the Persecution of pagans in the late Roman Empire, Christianisation of the Germanic peoples, Islamization of the Sudan region, Persecution of pagans under Theodosius I, Persecution of pagans under Constantius II, Scramble for Africa, Colonization of Australia, and Colonization of the Americas. Modern Pagans, who practice various forms of paganism, are a religious minority in every country where they exist. They have been subject to religious discrimination and/or religious persecution. The largest modern Pagan communities are in North America and the United Kingdom, and the issue of discrimination receives most attention in those locations. Although the persecution of Pagans has decreased in recent centuries, it still exists in some parts of the world. The community of Pagans and Wiccans continues to face Christian persecution, particularly in the United States, where they are frequently subjected to negative stereotypes and misconceptions, such as those perpetuated during the Satanic Panic.

=== Philosophers ===
Philosophers throughout the history of philosophy have been held in courts and tribunals for various offenses, often as a result of their philosophical activity, and some have even been put to death. The most famous example of a philosopher being put on trial is the case of Socrates, who was tried for, amongst other charges, corrupting the youth and impiety. Others include:

- Giordano Bruno - pantheist philosopher who was burned at the stake by the Roman Inquisition for his heretical religious views, his cosmological views, or both;
- Tommaso Campanella - confined to a convent for his heretical views, namely, an opposition to the authority of Aristotle, and later imprisoned in a castle for 27 years during which he wrote his most famous works, including The City of the Sun;
- Baruch Spinoza - Jewish philosopher who, at age 23, was put in cherem (similar to excommunication) by Jewish religious authorities for heresies such as his controversial ideas regarding the authenticity of the Hebrew Bible, which formed the foundations of modern biblical criticism, and the pantheistic nature of the Divine. Prior to that, he had been attacked on the steps of the community synagogue by a knife-wielding assailant shouting "Heretic!", and later his books were added to the Catholic Church's Index of Forbidden Books.

=== Serers ===
The persecution of the Serer people of Senegal, Gambia and Mauritania is multifaceted, and it includes both religious and ethnic elements. Religious and ethnic persecution of the Serer people dates back to the 11th century when King War Jabi usurped the throne of Tekrur (part of present-day Senegal) in 1030, and by 1035, introduced Sharia law and forced his subjects to submit to Islam. With the assistance of his son (Leb), their Almoravid allies and other African ethnic groups who have embraced Islam, the Muslim coalition army launched jihads against the Serer people of Tekrur who refused to abandon Serer religion in favour of Islam. The number of Serer deaths are unknown, but it triggered the exodus of the Serers of Tekrur to the south following their defeat, where they were granted asylum by the lamanes. Persecution of the Serer people continued from the medieval era to the 19th century, resulting in the Battle of Fandane-Thiouthioune. From the 20th to the 21st centuries, persecution of the Serers is less obvious, nevertheless, they are the object of scorn and prejudice.

=== Sikhs ===
The 1984 anti-Sikh riots or the 1984 Sikh Massacre was a series of pogroms directed against Sikhs in India, by anti-Sikh mobs, in response to the assassination of Indira Gandhi, on 31 October 1984, by two of her Sikh bodyguards in response to her actions authorising the military operation Operation Blue Star. There were more than 8,000 deaths, including 3,000 in Delhi. In June 1984, during Operation Blue Star, Indira Gandhi ordered the Indian Army to attack the Golden Temple and eliminate any insurgents, as it had been occupied by Sikh separatists who were stockpiling weapons. Later operations by Indian paramilitary forces were initiated to clear the separatists from the countryside of Punjab state.

The Indian government reported 2,700 deaths in the ensuing chaos. In the aftermath of the riots, the Indian government reported 20,000 had fled the city, however the People's Union for Civil Liberties reported "at least" 1,000 displaced persons. The most affected regions were the Sikh neighbourhoods in Delhi. The Central Bureau of Investigation, the main Indian investigating agency, is of the opinion that the acts of violence were organized with the support from the then Delhi police officials and the central government headed by Indira Gandhi's son, Rajiv Gandhi. Rajiv Gandhi was sworn in as Prime Minister after his mother's death and, when asked about the riots, said "when a big tree falls, the earth shakes" thus trying to justify the communal strife.

There are allegations that the government destroyed evidence and shielded the guilty. The Asian Age front-page story called the government actions "the Mother of all Cover-ups" There are allegations that the violence was led and often perpetrated by Indian National Congress activists and sympathisers during the riots. The chief weapon used by the mobs, kerosene, was supplied by a group of Indian National Congress Party leaders who owned filling stations.

=== Yazidis ===
The Persecution of Yazidis has been ongoing since at least the 10th century. The Yazidi religion is regarded as devil worship by Islamists. Yazidis have been persecuted by Muslim Kurdish tribes since the 10th century, and by the Ottoman Empire from the 17th to the 20th centuries. After the 2014 Sinjar massacre of thousands of Yazidis by the Islamic State of Iraq and the Levant, Yazidis still face violence from the Turkish Armed Forces and its ally the Syrian National Army, as well as discrimination from the Kurdistan Regional Government. According to Yazidi tradition (based on oral traditions and folk songs), estimated that 74 genocides against the Yazidis have been carried out in the past 800 years.

=== Zoroastrians ===
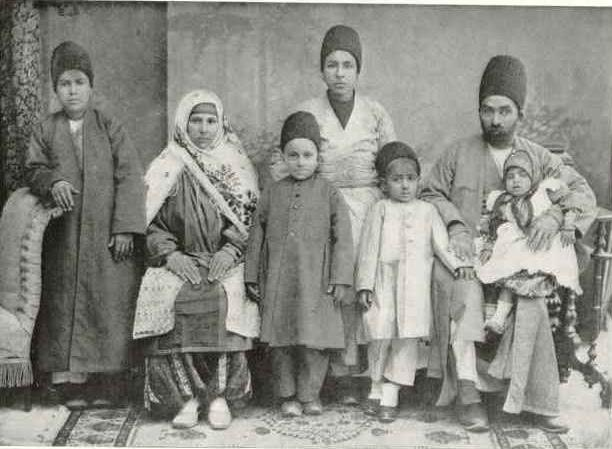
A Zoroastrian family in Qajar Iran about 1910

Persecution of Zoroastrians is the religious persecution inflicted upon the followers of the Zoroastrian faith. The persecution of Zoroastrians occurred throughout the religion's history. The discrimination and harassment began in the form of sparse violence and forced conversions. Muslims are recorded to have destroyed fire temples. Zoroastrians living under Muslim rule were required to pay a tax called jizya.

Zoroastrian places of worship were desecrated, fire temples were destroyed and mosques were built in their place. Many libraries were burned and much of their cultural heritage was lost. Gradually an increasing number of laws were passed which regulated Zoroastrian behavior and limited their ability to participate in society. Over time, the persecution of Zoroastrians became more common and widespread, and the number of believers decreased by force significantly.

Most were forced to convert due to the systematic abuse and discrimination inflicted upon them by followers of Islam. Once a Zoroastrian family was forced to convert to Islam, the children were sent to an Islamic school to learn Arabic and study the teachings of Islam, as a result some of these people lost their Zoroastrian faith. However, under the Samanids, who were Zoroastrian converts to Islam, the Persian language flourished. On occasion, the Zoroastrian clergy assisted Muslims in attacks against those whom they deemed Zoroastrian heretics.

A Zoroastrian astrologer named Mulla Gushtasp predicted the fall of the Zand dynasty to the Qajar army in Kerman. Because of Gushtasp's forecast, the Zoroastrians of Kerman were spared by the conquering army of Agha Mohammad Khan Qajar. Despite the aforementioned favorable incident, the Zoroastrians during the Qajar dynasty remained in agony and their population continued to decline. Even during the rule of Agha Mohammad Khan, the founder of the dynasty, many Zoroastrians were killed and some were taken as captives to Azerbaijan. Zoroastrians regard the Qajar period as one of their worst. During the Qajar dynasty, religious persecution of the Zoroastrians was rampant. Due to the increasing contacts with influential Parsi philanthropists such as Maneckji Limji Hataria, many Zoroastrians left Iran for India. There, they formed the second major Indian Zoroastrian community known as the Iranis.

== Ethnic ==
=== African Americans ===
African Americans have faced persecution in the forms of slavery, legal discrimination, and racial violence.

=== Assyrians ===
Due to their Christian faith and ethnicity, the Assyrians have been persecuted since their adoption of Christianity. During the reign of Yazdegerd I, Christians in Persia were viewed with suspicion as potential Roman subversives, resulting in persecutions while at the same time, they promoted Nestorian Christianity as a buffer between the Churches of Rome and Persia. Persecutions and attempts to impose Zoroastrianism continued during the reign of Yazdegerd II.

During the eras of Mongol rule under Genghis Khan and Timur, there was indiscriminate slaughter of tens of thousands of Assyrians and destruction of the Assyrian population of northwestern Iran and central and northern Iran.

More recent persecutions since the 19th century include the Massacres of Badr Khan, the Massacres of Diyarbakır (1895), the Adana massacre, the Assyrian genocide, the Simele massacre, and the al-Anfal campaign.

=== Hazara people ===
The Hazara people of central Afghanistan have been persecuted by Afghan rulers at various times in the history. Since the tragedy of 9/11, Sunni Muslim terrorists have been attacking the Hazara community in southwestern Pakistani town of Quetta, home to some 500,000 Hazara who fled persecution in neighbouring Afghanistan. Some 2,400 men, women and children have been killed or wounded with Lashkar-e-Jhangvi claiming responsibility for most of the attacks against the community. Consequently, many thousands have fled the country seeking asylum in Australia.

=== Roma ===
Antiziganism is hostility, prejudice, discrimination or racism directed against the Romani people as an ethnic group, or people who are perceived as being of Romani heritage.

The Porajmos was the planned and attempted effort, often described as a genocide, during World War II by the government of Nazi Germany and its allies to exterminate the Romani (Gypsy) people of Europe. Under the rule of Adolf Hitler, a supplementary decree to the Nuremberg Laws was issued on 26 November 1935, defining Gypsies as "enemies of the race-based state", the same category as Jews. Thus, the fate of Roma in Europe in some ways paralleled that of the Jews. Historians estimate that 220,000 to 500,000 Romani were killed by the Nazis and their collaborators, or more than 25% of the slightly less than 1 million Roma in Europe at the time. Ian Hancock puts the death toll as high as 1.5 million.

=== Rohingyas ===
The UN human rights chief slammed Myanmar's apparent "systematic attack" on the Rohingya minority, warning that "ethnic cleansing" seemed to be underway. Ethnic Rohingya Muslims who fled from security forces in Myanmar's Rakhine State have described killings, shelling, and arson in their villages that have all the hallmarks of a campaign of "ethnic cleansing," Human Rights Watch said. "Rohingya refugees have harrowing accounts of fleeing Burmese army attacks and watching their villages be destroyed," said Meenakshi Ganguly, South Asia director. "Lawful operations against armed groups do not involve burning the local population out of their homes."

=== Sri Lankan Tamils ===
Widespread attacks on Sri Lankan Tamils came in the form of island wide ethnic riots, including The 1958 anti-Tamil pogrom and the Black July riots. Further persecution through murders, targeted rape and kidnapping occurred. Whilst previously, the majority of Tamils demanded instead for a separate state, by 1983 armed struggles against Sinhalese extremists began to rise, culminating in the formation of the Liberation Tigers of Tamil Eelam.

=== Uyghurs ===
Uyghurs and other Turkic peoples in modern-day Xinjiang (called East Turkestan by independence activists) declared two short-lived independent East Turkestan Republics in the 20th century. In late 1949, the region and the rest of China came under the control of the People's Republic of China.

Uyghur activist groups have said that anger towards the Chinese government has been fueled by years of state-sponsored oppression and discrimination. In 2017, the China began a large-scale crackdown on the Xinjiang region, which it justifies as a counterterrorism campaign following sporadic terrorist attacks in Xinjiang. Scholars estimate that the Chinese government detained over one million Uyghurs in re-education camps (also called re-education camps) in order to indoctrinate them away from religion and Sinicize them (assimilate them into Chinese culture). Critics of the policy have described it as the Sinicization of Xinjiang and they have also called it an ethnocide or a cultural genocide, while some governments, activists, independent NGOs, human rights organizations, academics, government officials, and the East Turkistan Government-in-Exile have called it a genocide.

=== LGBT ===
In many countries around the world, consensual same-sex acts are criminalized, leading to significant persecution and discrimination against individuals identifying as LGBTQ+. This criminalization often results in state-sanctioned violence, discrimination in various aspects of life, and severe legal penalties, including lengthy prison sentences or, in some cases, the death penalty. These laws restrict the fundamental human rights and physical safety of LGBTQ+ individuals, creating an environment of fear and secrecy and often forcing individuals to seek asylum or live in hiding due to the lack of legal protections and persistent societal hostility. Discussion about morality and legality of LGBT conduct is ongoing.

== See also ==
- Persecution of Atheists
- Persecution of Christians
- Christian martyrs
- Defamation
- Discrimination
- Latter-day Saint martyrs
- Lawfare
- Oppression
- Persecutory delusion
- Right to asylum
- Social defeat
- Social exclusion

== Sources ==
- Hitti, Philip Khūri (1924). Origins of the Druze People and Religion. Forgotten Books. ISBN 978-1-60506-068-2.
