= Bamako shooting =

Bamako shooting may refer to the following firearms incidents that have occurred in Bamako:

- March 2015 Bamako shooting
- 2015 Bamako hotel attack
- June 2017 Bamako attack
