= 2015 Bamako shooting =

2015 Bamako shooting could mean:

- the March 2015 Bamako shooting
- the November 2015 Bamako hotel attack
