= List of terrorist attacks in Mali =

Mali attacks
- Part of Mali War
- Location of Mali in Africa
- Location: Mali
- Date: 2020 - present
- Attack type: Shooting
- Deaths: 181 (+20)
- Injuries: 56

This article lists attacks that have occurred in Mali since 2020.

The attacks left at least 181 people dead and another 56 were injured. At least 20 attackers were also killed in this attacks.

== Timeline of attacks ==
=== 2020 ===
Date	Location	Deaths	Injuries	Details
7 April 2020	Bamba, Gao Region	25	6	Gunmen on motorbikes attacked a military base in Bamba, Gao Region, Mali, killing at least 25 soldiers and another 6 were injured.
24 April 2020	Mopti Region	12		At least 12 people were killed in multiple attacks in several locations.
6 June 2020	Mopti Region	26		At least 26 people were killed by unknown assailants in Binedama village.
2 July 2020	Mopti Region	32		Gunmen on motorbikes attack an ethnic Dogon village in Mopti Region, killing 32 villagers, according to local authorities.
3 July 2020	Mopti Region	9	2	The Malian Armed Forces says nine troops were killed and two wounded in an ambush by suspected jihadists in Mopti Region.
27 August 2020	Mopti Region	4	12	Four Malian soldiers are killed and 12 wounded when their anti-poaching convoy is ambushed in the volatile region of Mopti. Islamist insurgents are suspected to be behind the attack and reinforcements were sent to the area from the town of Konna.
13 October 2020	Mopti Region	25		Jihadist militants kill 25 people, including 13 soldiers, in multiple attacks across central Mali. A military camp near Bandiagara is looted and burned down by the militants.

=== 2021 ===
Date	Location	Deaths	Injuries	Detail
24 January 2021	Mopti Region	6	18	Six Malian troops are killed and 18 others are injured in simultaneous jihadist attacks in the central Mopti Region. The military say around 30 militants were also killed in the clashes.
3 February 2021	Mopti Region	9 (+20)	4	Nine soldiers are killed and six others are wounded during an ambush near the village of Boni, Mopti Region. 20 attackers were are also killed in the attack.
17 March 2021	Gao Region	33	14	At least 33 soldiers are killed and 14 others are wounded in an attack on a military post in Gao.
3 December 2021	Mopti region	31		Thirty-one civilians are killed on a bus near Bankass.

== See also ==
- Battle of Konna
- Insurgency in the Maghreb (2002–present)
- Ogossagou massacre
- Timeline of the Mali War
- Tuareg rebellion (2012)
