= List of massacres during the Mali War =

Mali (Africa)

This is a list of massacres that have taken place during the Mali War.

== List ==
Name	Date	Location	Deaths	Description
Tamkoutat massacre	6 February 2014	Tamkoutat and nearby areas, Ménaka Region, Mali	31-35 Imghad Tuareg civilians killed, 6 injured	Around thirty civilians, mostly Imghad Tuaregs, were massacred near Tamkoutat. The Malian government and the MNLA accused MUJAO of being responsible for the killings, while other witnesses suggested a communal conflict between Tuaregs and Fulanis.
Gao massacre	18 January 2017	Gao	77 people killed, 115+ injured	A suicide bomber used explosive filled vehicle and attacked a military camp near Gao
Ogossagou massacre	23 March 2019	Ogossagou and Welingara, Mopti Region	160 Fulani herders killed	Terrorist gunmen attacked Ogossagou and Welingara villagers during the 2019 government protest that led to resignations
Sobane Da massacre	10 June 2019	Sobane Da (Dogon village)	35 and 95 people killed at different attacks	19 people remained missing. The government suspected these were terrorist attacks
Indelimane attack	1 November 2019	Indelimane, Ménaka Region	More than 70 soldiers and a civilian were killed	Three people were wounded.
Mopti bus massacre	3 December 2021	Mopti region	31 people killed, 17 injured	Gunmen shot civilians in a bus and set it on fire
Moura massacre	27 and 31 March 2022	Moura, Mopti Region	500+ civilians killed	Conflict between the Malian Armed Forces and alleged Russian mercenaries from the Wagner Group, with Al-Qaeda in the Islamic Maghreb's Jama'at Nasr al-Islam wal Muslimin
Hombori massacre	19 April 2022	Hombori	50+ civilians killed; 500-600 arrested	Malian Army and Russian Wagner Group mercenaries fired and killed people in a market
2022 Bankass massacres	18-19 June 2022	Bankass Cercle, Mopti Region	132 people killed	The Macina Katiba Islamic militants carried out the attack against the Dogon people
Djiguibombo massacre	1 July 2024	Djiguibombo, Mopti Region	around 40 people killed	Unidentified attackers targeted a wedding ceremony.
Diafarabé massacre	12 May 2025	Diafarabé	22 people killed	Malian soldiers arrested 28 men, killing 22

== See also ==
- Timeline of the Mali war
