= Mali wedding attack =

Mali wedding attack may refer to:

- Mali wedding airstrike
- Djiguibombo massacre
