= 2020 Bankass massacres =

Massacres in Bankass Cercle, Mali

- Part of Dogon-Fulani conflict during the Mali War
- Location: Gouari, Djimdo, Pangadougou, and Dialaikanda, Bankass Cercle, Mali
- Date: July 1, 2020; 3pm-9pm
- Target: Dogon civilians
- Deaths: 32
- Injuries: 4
- Perpetrator: Fulani militants of JNIM (suspected)

On July 1, 2020, Fulani militants attacked four Dogon villages in Mali's Bankass Cercle, killing at least thirty-three people.

== Background ==
Throughout the Mali War, inter-ethnic clashes have erupted several times between Dogon dozos and Fulani militants over land usage stemming from the Fulani's pastoralist lifestyles and the Dogon using their land for farming. When the Mali War intensified in the Mopti Region, the jihadist Katiba Macina movement attracted many young Fulani as it overthrew the traditional Fulani caste system. Around this time, Dogon dozos formed Dan Na Ambassagou militias in Dogon areas, which were armed by the Malian government. This made inter-ethnic conflict not just between Dogon and Fulani, but often also between the jihadist Katiba Macina and the larger Jama'at Nasr al-Islam wal Muslimin against the pro-government Dan Na Ambassagou. In the area of the massacres, Dogon militants had recently launched attacks against Fulani villages.

== Massacres ==
Around sixty motorcycles attacked the village of Pangadougou around 3pm, killing one person. The jihadists then moved onto the village of Djimdo, targeting residents who were returning to the village from their fields. In Gouari, sixteen people were killed and four others were injured. The last village attacked by the jihadists was Dialaikanda, although nobody was killed or injured in the attack. An elder from Gouari who survived the massacre stated that there were no security forces in the town between 3pm and 9pm, and chastised the Malian army for never being able to prevent an attack by jihadists. The residents' livestock was seized by the attackers, and several buildings were burnt down in Gouari and Djimdo.

== Aftermath ==
No group immediately claimed responsibility for the attack. However, Fulani militants of Jama'at Nasr al-Islam wal Muslimin were suspected to be responsible. An anonymous Malian official stated that at least thirty people were killed in the massacres, with that number later rising to thirty-three people killed and five others injured, as well as an unknown number of residents missing. Amnesty International stated thirty-two people had been killed in a 2022 report.

A Malian military unit was dispatched to the area the following day, and helped bury thirty-one bodies. On July 3, Malian forces received information about a renewed attack in Gouari, and sent a contingent of soldiers to the village. However, the village was deserted, and nine Malian soldiers were killed and two others were injured in an ambush.
