= Indelimane ambush =

Indelimane ambush may refer to:

- 2014 Indelimane ambush
- 2017 Indelimane ambush
