= Sévaré hotel attack =

2015 battle of the Mali War

- Part of Mali War
| Date | August 7, 2015 |
| Location | Byblos Hotel, Sévaré, Mali 14.5333°N 4.1°W |
| Result | Malian victory |

Belligerents
| Mali | al-Mourabitoun; Katiba Macina |

Casualties and losses
| 4 killed 8–10 injured | 4 killed |
- 5 civilians killed

On August 7, 2015, jihadists from Al-Mourabitoun and Katiba Macina attacked the Byblos Hotel in Sévaré, Mali. The attack was one of the largest attacks against civilians in Mopti Region during the Mali War, and led to the deaths of thirteen people, including five civilians.

== Background ==
Jihadist groups like Ansar Dine and al-Mourabitoun have been fighting the Malian government since the Tuareg rebellion broke out in 2012. In late 2014 and early 2015, these groups expanded westward, gaining footholds into Tombouctou Region and Mopti Region, and sometimes conducting attacks in major western Malian centers such as a restaurant in Bamako in March 2015 and Nara that June.

On August 3, just four days before the attack in Sévaré, militants from Al-Qaeda in the Islamic Maghreb attacked Malian forces in the riverine town of Gourma-Rharous, Tombouctou region, killing eleven soldiers.

== Attack ==
On August 7, a small group of jihadists was dispatched to the Byblos Hotel in Sévaré, locally known as a place for former pilots and mechanics working for MINUSMA. The first attack was on a bus carrying the expatriates to the Mopti Airport, when a jihadist opened fire on the bus driver, who fled on foot. The jihadist then threw a grenade into the bus, killing two people. Afterwards, the perpetrator fled into the Byblos Hotel.

Due to Sévaré's proximity to the Malian military base in Mopti, a large number of Malian soldiers were quickly dispatched to Sévaré. The Malian government surrounded the hotel, engaging in a shootout that lasted for several hours. Three soldiers were killed in a vehicle bombing during the shootout. That night, Malian gendarmerie teams launched an assault on the hotel at around 4 or 5 am. No shots were fired, and the Malian forces discovered the bodies of two expatriates. The last jihadist in the hotel was killed.

The French army, while stationed at the nearby airport, did not intervene with the exception of a few fly-bys over the hotel by French planes.

== Aftermath ==
=== Casualties ===
The Malian government released a statement on August 7 announcing the provisional death toll of five Malian soldiers, two wounded, two jihadists killed, and seven suspects arrested. This statement was amended two days later, with the updated toll being four soldiers killed, four jihadists killed, and five MINUSMA contractors killed. Eight Malian soldiers were injured, and seven suspects were arrested. The United Nations stated in its September 2015 report that four Malian soldiers were killed and ten were injured, along with four MINUSMA contractors and one civilian.

Four hostages were rescued, including two Ukrainians, two Russians, and a South African. The five MINUSMA contractors killed included a Malian driver, a South African, two Ukrainians, and a Nepali. Reuters reported the deaths of four other civilians, but this was nor corroborated by other news agencies. RFI reported that the four hostages were never actually taken hostage by the attackers; they instead managed to stay hidden within the hotel. The Malian army was tipped off to the seven suspects by locals who claimed they provided logistics and intelligence to the attackers, but all seven suspects were released. Anti-terrorism experts arrived in Sévaré on August 9 to assess the situation.

=== Perpetrator ===
On August 8, the Malian government suspected Mopti region's Ansar Dine affiliate Katiba Macina for the attack. In an August 10 press release given to Al Jazeera, Al-Mourabitoun claimed responsibility for the attack. That same day, Souleyman Mohamed Kennen, a close confidant of Katiba Macina leader Amadou Koufa, claimed responsibility for the attack. Kennen claimed to have fought with Mokhtar Belmokhtar, leader of Al-Qaeda in the Islamic Maghreb, in 2012. Kennen and al-Mourabitoun's claims established a level of connection between the two groups.

The Coordination of Azawad Movements, a Tuareg-dominated coalition of rebels that had fought the Malian government from 2012 until an August 2015 peace deal, dubbed the hotel attack as "terrorist attacks" and expressed their condolences.
