= Hippodrome, Bamako =

Quarter of Bamako, Mali

Hippodrome is a Quartier of Bamako, the capital of Mali.

Many embassies are located in the Quartier. Furthermore one can find many restaurants, bars, foodstores and hotels in the Quartier. Popular destinations include La Terrasse and Sky Bar. The seat of Geekcorps is also located in the Quartier. On March 7, 2015, In the March 2015 Bamako shooting Four people were shot dead & eight wounded in La Terrace restaurant of Hippodrome district.
