= 2017 Gao bombing =

Terrorist attack in Gao, Mali

- Part of the Mali War
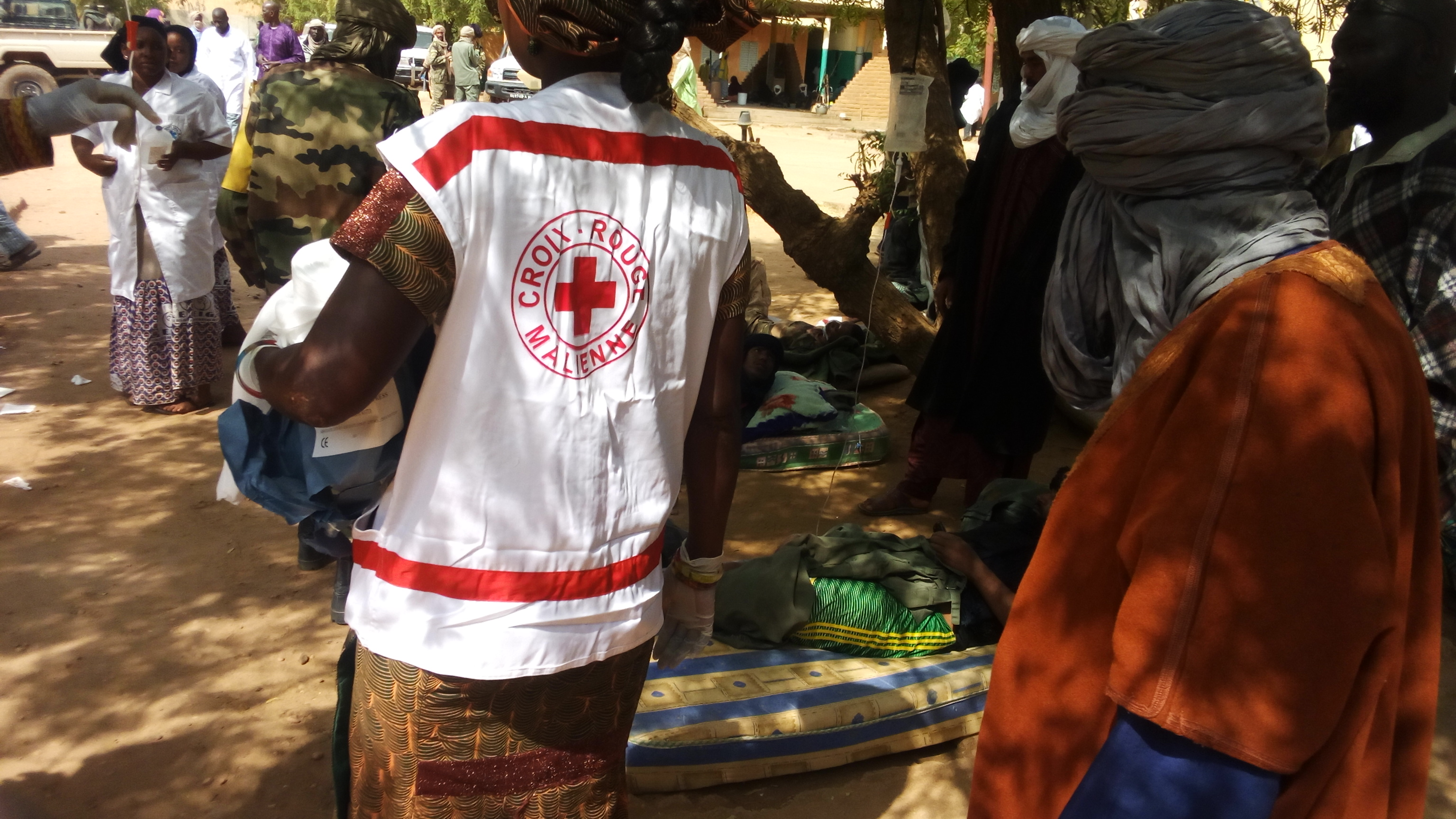

- Gao (Mali)
- Location: 16.257°N 0.006°W; Gao, Mali
- Date: 18 January 2017; 9 years ago
- Attack type: Suicide bombing, car bombing
- Weapon: explosives
- Deaths: 78 (including the perpetrator)
- Injuries: 120 estimated
- Perpetrator: Al-Mourabitoun

On 18 January 2017, a suicide bomber drove a vehicle filled with explosives into a military camp near Gao, Mali, killing 77 people and injuring at least 115. The incident is the deadliest terrorist attack in Malian history.

== Incident ==
At around 09:00 local time, a vehicle filled with explosives entered the Joint Operational Mechanism base that housed members of the Malian Army and former militants who had signed a peace agreement with the government. According to an army spokesman, the vehicle was marked with insignia of the active military unit in the area. Dozens of people were killed, though the exact number was initially unclear—Malian state broadcaster ORTM said that 47 were dead, while the President's office estimated there to be 60 fatalities and 115 injured. On 19 January, a French Army spokesman said that the death toll had risen to 77.

Al-Qaeda in the Islamic Maghreb claimed responsibility for the attack through its Al-Mourabitoun affiliate, saying that the bombing had been "punishment for Mali's cooperation with France." The statement attributed the attack to the Mourabitoun battalion and identified the bomber as Abdul Hadi al-Fulani.

== Response ==
Malian President Ibrahim Boubacar Keita declared a three-day period of national mourning, while Foreign Minister Abdoulaye Diop said that while the attack was "criminal, cowardly, [and] barbaric," it would not end the government's efforts to reach peace with the country's militant fighters. Defence Minister Abdoulaye Idrissa Maïga was scheduled to travel to Gao in response to the bombing.

== See also ==
- List of massacres in Mali
