= 2014 Indelimane ambush =

- Part of Mali War
Date	October 3, 2014
Location	Indelimane, Gao Region, Mali
Result	Jihadist victory

Belligerents
MINUSMA; Niger	al-Mourabitoun

Casualties and losses
9 killed	None

On October 3, 2014, nine Nigerien peacekeepers were killed in an ambush by al-Mourabitoun in Indelimane, Mali.

== Background ==
MINUSMA was deployed in the wake of the Mali War as a United Nations peacekeeping force. Nigerien forces were deployed to Mali as part of this peacekeeping force.

== Ambush ==
On the morning of the attack, a MINUSMA convoy was carrying out a supply mission between Ansongo and Ménaka. When the convoy arrived near the village of Indelimane, the peacekeepers were ambushed by two jihadists on motorcycles armed with RPG-7s. The rockets destroyed two vehicles and a tank, and the attackers left shortly afterward.

Nigerien authorities reported that MOJWA was behind the attack. MOJWA had merged in August 2013 with Blood Signatories to form Al-Mourabitoun. The Nigerien government stated in a press release on the evening of October 3 that nine peacekeepers were killed during the attack. The ambush was the deadliest attack against MINUSMA since the start of its deployment one year earlier. A funeral took place for the victims in Bamako on October 7.
