= Tamkoutat massacre =

2014 massacre in Mali

- Part of Inter-communal conflicts of the Mali War
- Location: Tamkoutat and nearby areas, Ménaka Region, Mali
- Date: February 6, 2014
- Target: Imghad Tuareg civilians
- Deaths: 31–35
- Injuries: 6
- Perpetrators: Fulani militants (per MINUSMA, Human Rights Watch, Reuters, and the Malian Ministry of National Reconciliation) MOJWA (per Malian Ministry of Defense, Malian Ministry of Internal Security, and the MNLA)
- No. of participants: 12–20

On February 6, 2014, between thirty-one and thirty-five Imghad Tuareg civilians were massacred by Fulani militants that may have been connected to the jihadist outfit Movement for Oneness and Jihad in West Africa (MOJWA) in and around Tamkoutat, Ménaka Region, Mali.

== Background ==
In late 2013, after jihadist forces were expelled from Ménaka Region, tensions rose between Tuaregs and Fulani. The first outbreak of conflict between the two groups occurred on November 7, 2013, between Djebok and Tamkoutat, when twenty-five carnival workers coming from Djebok were arrested and robbed of four million CFA francs. Survivors stated that the assailants spoke Arabic in a Tamacheq accent and claimed to be from MOJWA.

On the night between November 18 and 19, a seventy-year-old man and a three-year-old girl were murdered in the village of Intakabar. A seventy-year-old woman and a ten-year-old girl were injured in the attack. The victims were all relatives of El Hadj Ag Gamou, the commander of the Imghad Tuareg GATIA militia. Gamou assessed that the perpetrators of the murders were Fulani MOJWA militants. In response to the attack, Imghad Tuaregs assassinated a notable from Djebok. Clashes then erupted between Fulani and Tuaregs leaving several Tuaregs dead and over fifty Fulani dead, but little is known about them. Fifty-three Fulani civilians were then massacred by Tuaregs in Tin-Hama on November 18.

Abdoul-Aziz Souleymane, a local Fulani leader, stated that the reason many Fulani in the region joined MOJWA was less out of jihadism and more to obtain weapons to defend their livestock from Tuareg raids. Souleymane clarified that MOJWA's ranks also include Songhai and Arab fighters as well. New tensions broke out between Fulani and Tuaregs on February 4. Fulani civilians stated a Fulani MOJWA member was arrested by Tuaregs and sent to MINUSMA in late January, and that three Fulani civilians were killed by Tuaregs on February 2. This recent spate of violence was not connected to the Mali War, and came as a result of long-standing disputes over arable land for grazing.

== Massacre ==
The massacre took place twelve to twenty kilometers from Tamkoutat, a village in the commune of Anchawadi. Around 2 pm on February 6, after the carnival in Tamkoutat, two vehicles carrying Tuareg merchants were stopped by armed Fulani militants, who were travelling via motorcycle. The militants then attacked the Tuaregs who tried to resist, killing twenty six Tuaregs and injuring six others. Among the dead were one woman and one child. One of the Tuaregs' vehicles were burned, and the other was taken away. The attackers fled, and then killed three people nearby. Further south, the same attackers kidnapped and later killed two men at a nomadic camp near the Nigerien border.

== Aftermath ==
=== Casualties and culprit ===
==== Fulani militants ====
Oumar Maiga, an official from Gao, and Assarid Ag Imbarcaouane, a former official from Gao, stated thirty Tuaregs were killed in the massacre. MINUSMA peacekeepers who inspected the site the day after the massacre stated that twenty-four people had been killed and four injured, including one seriously. The wounded were evacuated to the hospital in Gao. The Malian Army, on scene, also arrested several suspects. MINUSMA, in a press release, attributed the massacre to inter-communal conflict.

On February 10, MINUSMA spokesperson Olivier Salgado stated that the United Nations considered the massacre a result of inter-communal violence. Human Rights Watch stated that local sources contradicted General Samaka's claims of MOJWA being responsible. Malian Minister of National Reconciliation Cheikh Oumar Diarra affirmed reports of an inter-communal conflict revolving around land use between Tuaregs and Fulani. Azawadian media stated thirty-five Tuaregs were killed in the massacre, and accused Fulani militants backed by the Malian government for the attack.

==== MOJWA ====
The Malian Ministry of Defense stated on February 7 that around a dozen attackers killed thirty Tuareg civilians. The Ministry of Internal Security, however, stated that the attackers were MOJWA and that the victims were not all Tuaregs. General Soungalo Togola, the communications officer for the Ministry of Internal Security, attributed this to his visit with the survivors at the hospital in Gao, in which he affirmed that none of the wounded were Tuaregs. Togola also stated the final toll was thirty dead, including the attacks nearby and at the nomadic camp. Seven others were injured according to him, and one of the wounded succumbed to his injuries later. Ministry head Gen. Sada Samaka corroborated Togola's claims, and accused MOJWA of the massacre.

The National Movement for the Liberation of Azawad (MNLA) reported on February 7 that twenty-five civilians were killed, excluding the other attacks included in other tolls, and the MNLA accused MOJWA of the massacre. The MNLA also claimed to have pursued the jihadists, and fought them on February 7. MNLA executive Moudet Ag Saci revised the toll to thirty-five killed later. RFI stated residents near Djebok accused MOJWA of the massacre.

=== Reprisal attacks ===
Clashes broke out on February 7 around twenty kilometers from the Nigerien border between the MNLA and MOJWA following the Tamkoutat massacre. The MNLA claimed to have confronted the group over the course of February 8, and destroyed one of their bases on the morning of February 9. MOJWA likely found refuge in Inafous, Niger, where they have a base. The MNLA claimed that they lost one fighter and one other was injured compared to six jihadists killed and two Arab jihadists captured. The MNLA claimed to then conduct operations between Ménaka and Labbézanga. An official from Ansongo confirmed the fighting, and stated it was between Imghad Tuaregs and Fulani. A Nigerien merchant was then killed by MOJWA on February 27 in Tamkoutat.
