= Djiguibombo massacre =

Mass murder by armed attackers in Mali

- Part of the Mali War
- Location: Djiguibombo, Mali
- Date: 1 July 2024
- Deaths: Around 40
- Perpetrator: Unknown

On 1 July 2024, a group of armed men entered Djiguibombo, in the Mopti Region of Mali, and massacred dozens of civilians. The attackers, who targeted a wedding ceremony, rode into the village on motorcycles. While the attackers have not been identified, and no group has claimed responsibility, local government officials blamed the attack on militants. The death toll of the attack has been pegged as at least 21 by local residents and some government officials, although other officials have stated that around 40 people were killed.

== Background ==
Since the start of the Mali War in 2012, northern and central Mali have experienced frequent violence from multiple factions, including ones tied to Al-Qaeda and the Islamic State. Since gaining power after the 2020 coup, Mali's military leaders have struggled to contain the violence, and a 2015 peace deal with Tuareg rebels collapsed.

== Perpetrators ==
Numerous local government officials stated they were unable to identify the attackers, who arrived via motorcycles. However, one attributed the attacks to "jihadists". A reporter for the Associated Press said while no group claimed responsibility for the attack, "it follows the pattern of ones by the al-Qaida-linked JNIM extremist group which often targets the region".

== See also ==
- List of massacres in Mali
