= Kangaba attack =

Terrorist attack in Bamako, Mali on 18 June 2017

- Location: 12.61489°N 7.86481°W; Kangaba, Mali
- Date: 18 June 2017
- Target: Le Campement Kangaba
- Attack type: Hostage taking
- Deaths: 5

On 18 June 2017, gunmen attacked Le Campement Kangaba in Dougourakoro, east of Bamako, Mali, a luxury resort frequented by tourists. Hostages were reported to have been taken and at least 5 people are reported to have been killed, including a Franco-Gabonese civilian, a Chinese citizen and a Portuguese soldier. According to an eyewitness, the attack began when a man on a motorcycle arrived at the compound and fired at the crowd. He was followed by two other assailants. Another group of 8-12 attackers positioned at the top of the camp shot at tourists from above Security forces stationed at the resort held off the attack for several hours while awaiting reinforcements. Once arrived, the United Nations troops from the Danish MINUSMA contingency, Malian SWAT, EUTM and French special forces managed to rescue around 20-60 people staying at the resort, including 1 Norwegian Christian missionary and his family who were separated from each other during the initial attack. Fire and smoke was seen rising from the Le Campement camp area and several gunfights between attackers and security forces were heard or seen during the day and night. Some residents hid in a cave near the resort and managed to avoid the attackers and was later recovered by UN forces.

Jama'at Nasr al-Islam wal Muslimin claimed responsibility for the attack, and Mali security minister Salif Traoré confirmed it was a jihadist attack. Malian troops, MINUSMA security forces and France's Operation Barkhane counter-terrorist force came to the site. Four assailants were confirmed killed but several others where wounded or bodies recovered by jihadists in the aftermath and four were arrested.

== Aftermath ==
=== Casualties ===
Deaths by nationality
Country	Number
Mali	1
France/Mali	1
France/Gabon	1
China	1
Portugal	1
Total	5

=== Decorations ===
Spanish Army Commander Miguel Angel Franco Fernandez was awarded the European Union's Common Security and Defence Policy Service Medal for his efforts in defending the civilians at the hotel.

== See also ==
- 2015 Bamako hotel attack
