= Dan Na Ambassagou =

Dogon militia in Mali

- Leaders: Youssouf Toloba; David Tembiné; Mamadou Goudienkilé
- Founded: October 2016
- Country: Mali
- Ideology: Dogon interests Anti-Fulani sentiment
- Size: 5,000
- Wars: Mali war

Dan Na Ambassagou (“hunters who trust in God,” in Dogon language) is an ethnic Dogon militia in Mali. The militia was set up in 2016 to defend Dogon communities against attacks, which has led to a number of conflicts with members of the Fula community. They accuse the Fula (or Peuhl) of sympathizing with or sheltering Islamist militants in their villages. They are run by Youssouf Toloba.

The group was behind a number of attacks in 2018. In September 2018, the Centre for Humanitarian Dialogue negotiated a unilateral ceasefire with Dan Na Ambassagou "in the context of the conflict which opposes the group to other community armed groups in central Mali."

The group gained widespread attention following the March 2019 attacks against Fulani herders, of which they were accused of being the perpetrators. The group denied any involvement in the attack. In response, President Ibrahim Boubacar Keïta ordered Dan Na Ambassagou to disband.
