= Anti-Fulani sentiment =

Hostility towards Fulani people

Anti-Fulani sentiment is the hostility that exists towards Fulani people in Nigeria, Mali and other West African nations and the discrimination that they are subjected to as a result of it. The Fulani are a semi-nomadic ethnic group that is dispersed across several West African countries. In 2021, Fulani people represented 6% of Nigeria's population.

== Islamic terrorism ==
Fulani people have been accused of supporting Islamic terrorist groups such as Boko Haram even though they themselves are often victims of terrorist attacks. These accusations have emboldened various ethnonationalist groups in Nigeria, such as the Igbo nationalist group Indigenous People of Biafra, which attempts to spread anti-Fulani rhetoric. Alleged support for Islamist Terrorism was the main motive for the Ogossagou massacre in Mali by Dogon militias.

== Herder-farmer conflicts ==
The Herder–farmer conflicts in Nigeria are a series of disputes between Fulani cattle herders and non-Fulani farmers over land, sometimes resulting in violence. The competition with Fulani herders has fueled anti-Fulani sentiment in Nigeria from politicians and news outlets. In response to this conflict, some states in Nigeria have proposed or enacted laws to discourage Fulani herders from bringing their cattle for grazing. These laws have been accused of being discriminatory towards the Fulani people without solving the problem. The Fulani advocacy group Tabital Pulaaku International has accused Adamawa senator Binos Dauda Yaroe of hate speech after he blamed Fulani pastoralists for armed kidnappings in Nigeria.

=== Lynchings ===
The Herder-farmer conflicts have led to ethnically motivated killings against Fulani. On 1 February 2018, 7 Fulani men in Gboko, Benue State, Nigeria who were not accused of any wrongdoing were lynched by an angry mob after being kidnapped from a public transportation vehicle. After the attacks on Berom farming villages in Plateau State of 23–24 June 2018, Berom youths in Plateau State blocked highways and lynched an unknown number of suspected Fulani people. An angry mob in Edo State lynched five alleged Fulani herders who were carrying firearms.

== Fulani radio station ==
Leaders in Nigeria's southern and Middle Belt regions have expressed opposition to plans from the federal government to establish a Fulani-language radio station, claiming it would promote genocidal propaganda against non-Fulanis, making comparisons to the Rwandan genocide.

== Online ==
In 2016, in response to a rise in conflicts with Fulani herders, the hashtag #fulaniherdsmen trended among Nigerian social media users, accompanied and fueled by anti-Fulani rhetoric. Online media and fake news have depicted Fulani herders as bloodthirsty murderers or terrorists, further inciting anti-Fulani sentiment. Nigerian Catholic bishop Matthew Hassan Kukah has called for an end to online "hate speech" towards Fulani herders.
