= Mopti bus massacre =

Massacre of civilians in a bus in Mopti

2021 Mali bus massacre
- Part of the Mali War
- Mopti (Mali)
- Location: Mopti Region, Mali
- Date: 3 December 2021
- Attack type: Mass shooting, arson
- Deaths: 31
- Injuries: 17
- Perpetrator: Suspected Islamist rebels

On 3 December 2021 unidentified gunmen attacked a bus in Mopti, Central Mali, firing at its occupants and setting it on fire, killing 31 civilians and injuring 17. Most of the passengers were women travelling from Songo-Doubacore to a market in Bandiagara.

According to the local mayor of Bankass, during the massacre, the insurgents slashed the tires, proceeding to shoot the civilians to death, then set the bus on fire. Malian authorities sent a group of state security officers to the crime scene, where they found 25 burnt bodies in the vehicle's trunk.

The massacre occurred on the same day that Islamist rebels attacked a convoy in the region, killing two United Nations peacekeepers. Two days later, unknown militants bombed two UN camps in Gao. The attacks occurred during a recent insurgency among Islamist insurgents in West Africa.

== Responses ==
President Assimi Goïta ordered all flags in the country to be flown at half-mast from Sunday to Tuesday, during which Mali would hold three national days of mourning.

United States Department of State spokesman Ned Price condemned the attack, expressing that the United States offers its "deepest condolences to the Malian people and will continue to partner with them in their pursuit of a safe, prosperous, and democratic future.”

== See also ==
- List of massacres in Mali
