= Al-Mourabitoun (militant group) =

2013–2017 Former African militant jihadist organization

al-Mourabitoun
- المرابطون
- Leaders: Abubakr al-Masri †; Mokhtar Belmokhtar †; Adnan Abu Walid al-Sahrawi †
- Dates active: August 2013 – 2 March 2017
- Active regions: Algeria; Burkina Faso; Ivory Coast; Libya; Mali; Niger
- Ideology: Salafist jihadism
- Size: Under 100 (May 2014, French claim)
- Part of: Al-Qaeda in the Islamic Maghreb
- Wars: the Insurgency in the Maghreb (2002–present); Northern Mali conflict

Al-Mourabitoun (Arabic: المرابطون, romanized: al-Murābiṭūn, lit. 'The Sentinels') also called Al-Mourabitoun Battalion was an African militant jihadist organization formed by a merger between Ahmed Ould Amer, a.k.a. Ahmed al-Tilemsi's Movement for Oneness and Jihad in West Africa, and Mokhtar Belmokhtar's Al-Mulathameen. On 4 December 2015, it joined Al-Qaeda in the Islamic Maghreb (AQIM). The group sought to implement Sharia law in Mali, Algeria, southwestern Libya, and Niger.

On 2 March 2017, al-Mourabitoun's cells in Mali, along with those of Ansar Dine, Macina Liberation Front and the Saharan branch of al-Qaeda in the Islamic Maghreb, merged into Jama'at Nasr al-Islam wal Muslimin, the official branch of al-Qaeda in Mali, after its leaders swore allegiance to Ayman al-Zawahiri.

== Origins and membership ==
Al-Mourabitoun was composed mostly of Tuaregs and Arabs from the northern Mali regions of Timbuktu, Kidal and Gao, but also included Algerians, Tunisians and other nationalities. Its area of operations was in northern Mali, near towns such as Tessalit and Ansongo.

The group's establishment was announced by Mokhtar Belmokhtar, though the group's leader was said to be a non-Algerian veteran of the anti-Soviet jihad in Afghanistan and the 2002 battles against American forces in the same country, later identified by French Intelligence as an Egyptian known as Abubakr al-Nasri (al-Masri). Abubakr was reportedly killed by French Special Forces in northeastern Mali between 10 and 17 April 2014, as was senior commander Omar Ould Hamaha weeks earlier.

The group is named after the Almoravids, a Berber North-West African Islamic dynasty of the 11th and 12th centuries, spanning from Morocco to Senegal and the Iberian Peninsula.

It was designated a terrorist organization by the UN, Australia, Canada, Iraq, the United Arab Emirates, the United Kingdom and the United States.

== History ==
On 14 May 2015, Adnan Abu Walid Sahraoui released an audio message pledging the group's allegiance to the Islamic State (IS). Belmokhtar issued a statement several days later rejecting this pledge and stating that it had not been approved beforehand, seeming to indicate a split in the group. On 3 December 2015, AQIM leader Abdelmalek Droukdel announced in an audio statement that Al-Mourabitoun had joined his organization. IS formally accepted Sahraoui's pledge of allegiance in a statement and video released in October 2016. The reason for the lengthy delay in acknowledgement was not clear.

On 2 March 2017, al-Mourabitoun's cells in Mali, along with those of Ansar Dine, Macina Liberation Front and the Saharan branch of Al-Qaeda in the Islamic Maghreb merged into Jama'at Nasr al-Islam wal Muslimin (JNIM).

JNIM is an official Al-Qaeda affiliate and remains a highly active militant organization in the Sahel as of late 2025. al-Mourabitoun's component groups continue their activities under the JNIM banner, and the broader alliance has expanded its influence across Mali, Burkina Faso, Niger, and into coastal West African states.

A separate, minor Egyptian faction also using the name Al-Mourabitoun exists, but it has not been observed to carry out prominent attacks and its activity is limited to propaganda.

== Timeline of attacks ==
- 7 March 2015: A masked gunman killed five and injured nine others at a restaurant popular with foreigners in Mali's capital Bamako. Among the victims were three locals, a Frenchman, and a Belgian security officer with the European Union representative in the city.
- 10 August 2015: An IED killed three Malian soldiers and injured four others near Sévaré.
- 11 August 2015: A coordinated assault against the Byblos hotel in Sévaré led to a 24-hour-long stand-off in which 13 people were killed, including five UN workers, four soldiers, and four attackers. The group later claimed responsibility for both this attack and the bombing the previous day.
- 20 November 2015: A group of militants took more than 170 people hostages at the Radisson Blu hotel in Bamako, sparking a siege that left 22 people dead, including two gunmen. At least seven others were injured in the attack, two of them being members of the Malian Special Forces.
- 15 January 2016: A group of militants staged a coordinated assault on two hotels and adjacent businesses in the center of Burkina Faso's capital Ouagadougou, burning vehicles and taking more than 200 hostages. At least 30 people were killed, and 56 others injured in the siege that followed.
- February 2016: The group released an audio message, in which it admitted it had kidnapped an Australian couple during the Ouagadougou attacks, and that it planned to release one of the captives, for it does "not target women in times of war". The wife of the doctor that was kidnapped during the Ouagadougou attacks was subsequently released on February 7. The doctor was released in May 2023.
- 13 March 2016: Three gunmen assaulted a beach resort in Grand-Bassam, Ivory Coast, using assault rifles and hand grenades. At least 21 people were killed in the attack, including all of the attackers, three members of the country's special forces, as well as 15 civilians (including at least five Europeans).
- 18 January 2017: A suicide bomber drove a vehicle filled with explosives into a military camp near Gao, Mali, killing 77 people and injuring at least 115 others. At the time it was the deadliest terrorist incident in the country's history.

== See also ==
- List of terrorist groups
- Mali War
