= Sobane Da massacre =

Terrorist attack in the Dogon village

- Part of the Mali War
- Mopti (Mali)
- Location: 14°28′02″N 3°08′47″W; Sobane Da, Mopti Region, Mali
- Date: June 10, 2019; 7 years ago
- Deaths: 35 confirmed dead

On 10 June 2019, the Dogon village of Sobane Da in Mali was attacked. Moulaye Guindo, mayor of neighbouring Bankass, blamed a Fulani militia group. The attack killed 35 people, revised from an earlier claim of 95 killed with 19 missing. A survivor said the attackers numbered about 50, driving motorbikes and pickup trucks. The government of Mali has suspected that terrorists have committed the attack.

== Background ==
The Fulanis who are traditionally herders and the Dogon who are traditionally farmers have had a historic dispute over grazing land and water which has been exacerbated by the spread of jihadism in Mali. The Dogon have accused the Fulani of supporting Al-Qaeda and other terrorist groups operating in Mali, while the Fulani have accused the state of sponsoring the Dogons to attack them. MINUSMA had recorded 488 Fulani deaths in attacks by Dogon, and 63 Dogon deaths from Fulani attacks during the period from January 2018 to 16 May 2019 in the Mopti and Ségou Regions. The deadliest was the Ogossagou massacre. The Jama'at Nasr al-Islam wal Muslimin and Amadou Koufa had promised retaliation by Fulanis.

== Attack ==
The attack on Sobane-Da began on 9 June and continued for seven hours. The perpetrators came on motorbikes and besieged the village, killing people and burning homes. The head of the village, Gouno Dara, has said that the attackers shot everyone they encountered and were repeatedly shouting "Allahu Akbar". Dara adds that they burnt buildings and stole domestic animals before retreating. A security source said that the village had been practically razed. Malian researcher, Ousmane Diallo, has commented that the attack bears the hallmarks of jihadists.

Earlier the government had given a provisional death toll of 95 based on claims by some soldiers and the mayor of the district, Ali Dolo. Doubts however started appearing on this figure and a count carried out by the civil protection force, forensics team and Mopti's public prosecutor confirmed the toll to be 35, the confusion being partly due to around 100 women being able to escape the village, according to a released government statement.

== Arrests ==
Six suspects were arrested, including 2 arrested by MINUSMA, following routine checks.

== Aftermath ==
One week after the attack, 41 people were killed in two more Dogon villages.

== See also ==
- List of massacres in Mali
- Ogossagou massacre
