= Ogossagou massacre =

Attacks against Fulani herders in central Mali

- Part of the Mali War
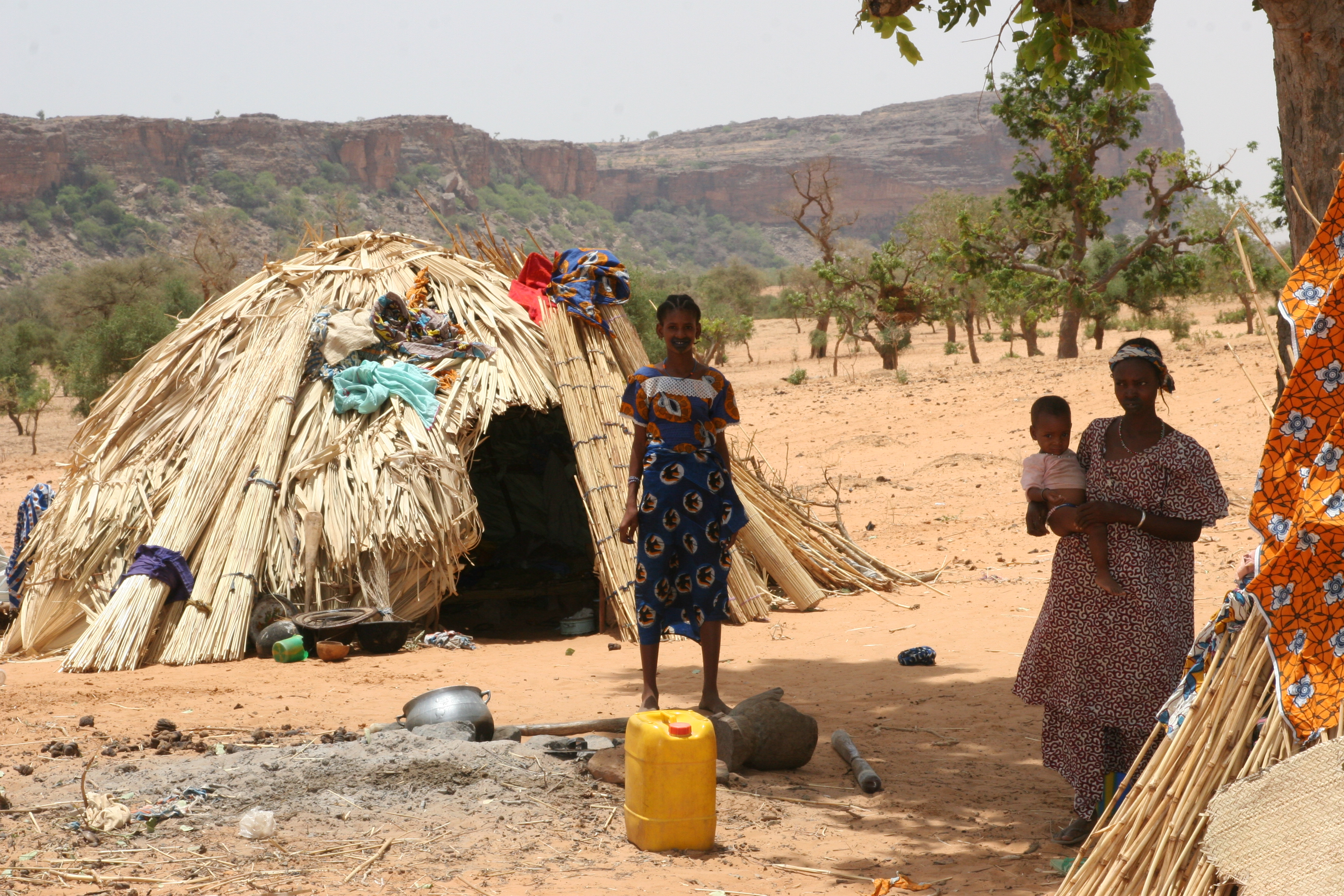
- Fulani settlement in Mali (2008)

- Map of Mali, Mopti Region highlighted
- Location: Ogossagou and Welingara, Mopti Region, Mali
- Date: 23 March 2019; 7 years ago
- Target: Fulani villagers
- Attack type: Massacre, ethnic cleansing, shooting, machete attack, arson
- Weapons: Firearms, machetes, fire
- Deaths: 160
- Perpetrator: Dan Na Ambassagou
- Motive: Anti-Fulani sentiment, Allegations that the villagers were involved in supporting Islamic terrorism

On March 23, 2019, several attacks by gunmen killed a reported 160 Fulani herders in central Mali. The violence came in the aftermath of the Malian government cracking down on Islamic terror cells in the country. Two villages, Ogossagou and Welingara, were particularly affected.

The massacre caused large protests in Mali against the government's perceived inaction, and led to the resignation of Prime Minister Soumeylou Boubèye Maïga and his ruling council.

== Background ==
The Fulani herdsmen have been increasingly in conflict and competition with other groups over land and water access for their cattle. These conflicts are exacerbated by climate change, land degradation, and population growth.

According to African Arguments, "Even though only a fraction of all Fulani are actively supporting such Islamist groups, this propaganda has succeeded in associating whole communities with these violent actors, further escalating the circle of violence."

== Attacks ==
The attacks took place in the Fulani villages of Ogossagou and Welingara. According to local Malian officials, the attacks were carried out by Dogon hunters armed with firearms and machetes. The attackers accused the Fulani villagers of having ties to jihadists and stated the attack was in retaliation for an al-Qaeda attack on a Malian military base the prior week which left 23 Malian soldiers dead. Witnesses stated that nearly every hut in the villages had been burned to the ground.

== Aftermath ==
In the aftermath, Mali president Ibrahim Boubacar Keïta fired army chief of staff General M'Bemba Moussa Keita and chief of land forces General Abdrahamane Baby. The United Nations announced that on 26 March they would send in a crime-scene investigation team.

President Keïta ordered the ethnic Dogon militia thought to be responsible for the attack, Dan Na Ambassagou, to be dissolved. Human Rights Watch has also accused the militia of being responsible, though the head of the group has denied it.

The UN Special Adviser on the Prevention of Genocide, Adama Dieng, warned of a growing ethnicization of the conflict. They noted that on 26 March six Dogon villagers were killed and a further 20 abducted by suspected Fulani armed elements in the hamlets of Ouadou and Kere Kere.

On 30 March, Mali detained five suspected attackers who had previously been treated as survivors of the assault.

Thousands of citizens protested on 5 April against the Malian government's failure to stem religious and ethnic violence. Under the growing threat of a no-confidence vote, the government of Prime Minister Soumeylou Boubèye Maïga collapsed and President Keïta accepted Maïga's resignation on 18 April.

Heavily armed members of Jama'at Nasr al-Islam wal Muslimin (JNIM), the leading Islamist group in Mali, attacked an army base in west-central Mali on 22 April. The militants called it partial revenge for the Ogossagou massacre and claimed that 16 soldiers had been killed, although the Malian Defence Ministry put the death toll at 11.

Another attack in February 2020 resulted in 21 deaths.

== See also ==
- Sobane Da massacre
- Nomadic conflict
- List of massacres in Mali
