= Radisson Blu Bamako attack =

2015 terrorist attack in Radisson Blu, Bamako

2015 Bamako hotel attack
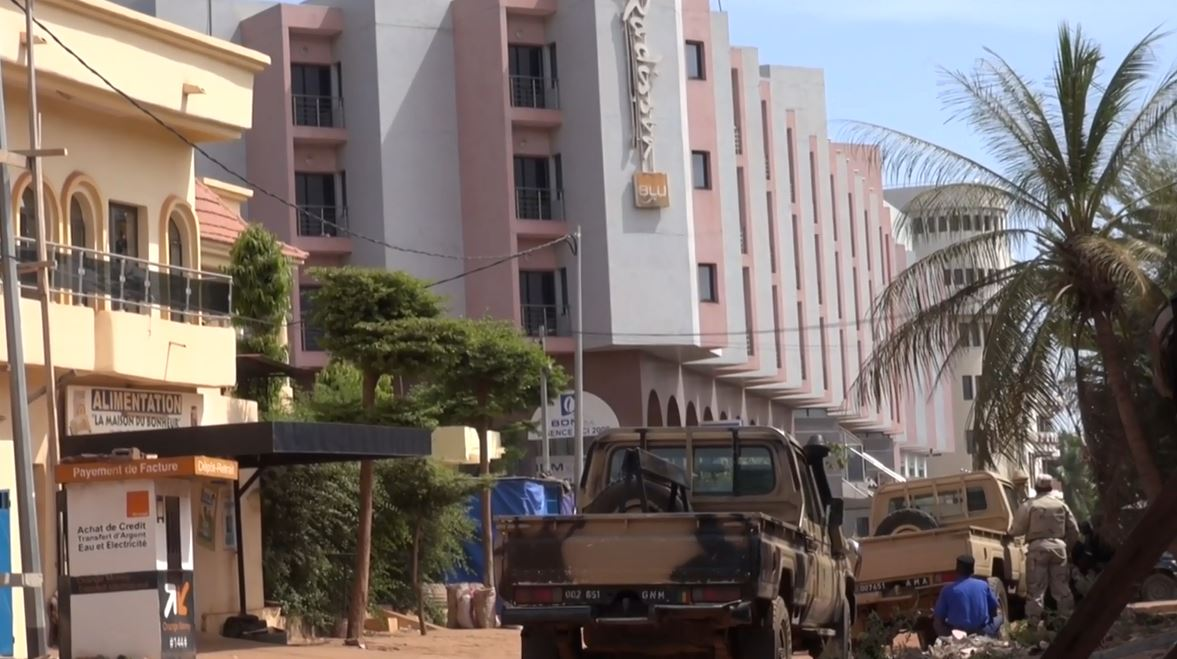
- Malian soldiers outside the hotel
- Location: 12.6352°N 8.0308°W; Bamako, Mali
- Date: 20 November 2015 (UTC)
- Attack type: Mass shooting, hostage taking
- Weapons: AK-47 assault rifles, hand grenades, Explosive belt
- Deaths: 22 (including the perpetrators)
- Injuries: 9
- Perpetrators: Al-Mourabitoun; Al-Qaeda in the Islamic Maghreb

On 20 November 2015, Islamist militants took 170 hostages and killed 20 of them in a mass shooting at the Radisson Blu hotel in Bamako, the capital city of Mali. The siege was ended when Malian special forces, backed by U.S. and French personnel, launched an assault on the hotel to recover the surviving hostages. Al-Mourabitoun claimed that it carried out the attack "in cooperation with" al-Qaeda in the Islamic Maghreb; an al Qaeda member confirmed that the two groups cooperated in the attack.

== Background ==
Following the 2011 Libyan civil war, many ethnic Tuareg (who had fought both for and against the Gaddafi government) militants left Libya for Azawad,a region in Northern Mali for which the National Movement for the Liberation of Azawad (MNLA) sought recognition as an independent state. Following several previously failed Tuareg rebellions, the MNLA seized the area and declared independence. However, the secular movement was soon overrun by Islamist-oriented groups such as the MOJWA and the Ansar Dine. The French launched a military operation that ousted the rebels with additional military support from the Economic Community of West African States (ECOWAS). However, simmering tensions between secular and jihadist factions resulted in continued violence and political unrest.

The Macina Liberation Front (MLF), a jihadist group founded in 2015 and affiliated with Ansar Dine, began operating in central and southern Mali. They were led by the radical Muslim cleric Amadou Kouffa, a close ally of Ansar Dine leader Iyad ag Ghali and a strong proponent of strict Islamic law in Mali. The group drew most of its support from the Fulani ethnic group from across the Sahel region. A Human Rights Watch report accused the MLF militants of human rights abuses in parts of central Mali since January 2015, and had allegedly executed at least five individuals the MLA alleged were allies of the Malian the government. The MLA attacked police and military, particularly in the Mopti region, most recently killing three soldiers in Tenenkou in August, 2015. On November 16, The Malian military announced the arrest of Alaye Bocari, allegedly a key MLF financier and Kouffa's right-hand man.

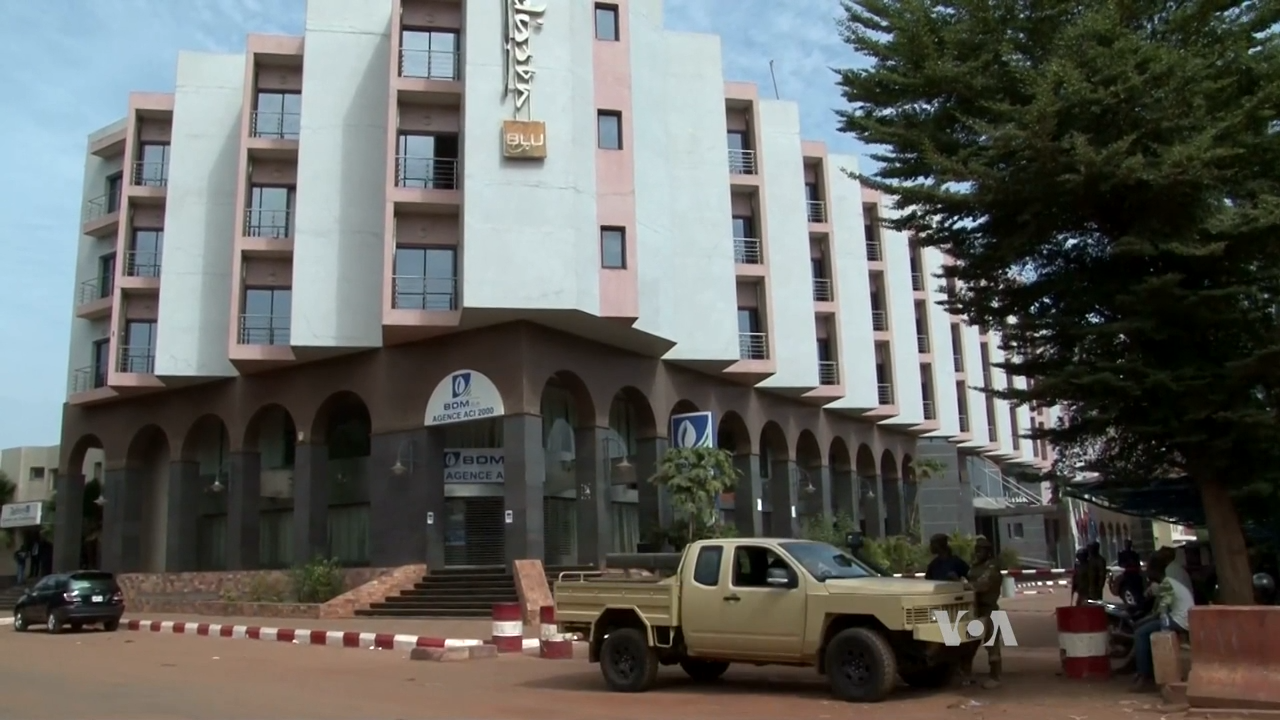
The Radisson Blu hotel in Bamako

The Radisson Blu hotel is in a business district of Bamako and close to the embassies, and is frequented by foreign travelers and government employees. It is part of a chain of up-market hotels operated by the Carlson Rezidor Hotel Group, which has headquarters in the United States and Belgium.

== Attack ==
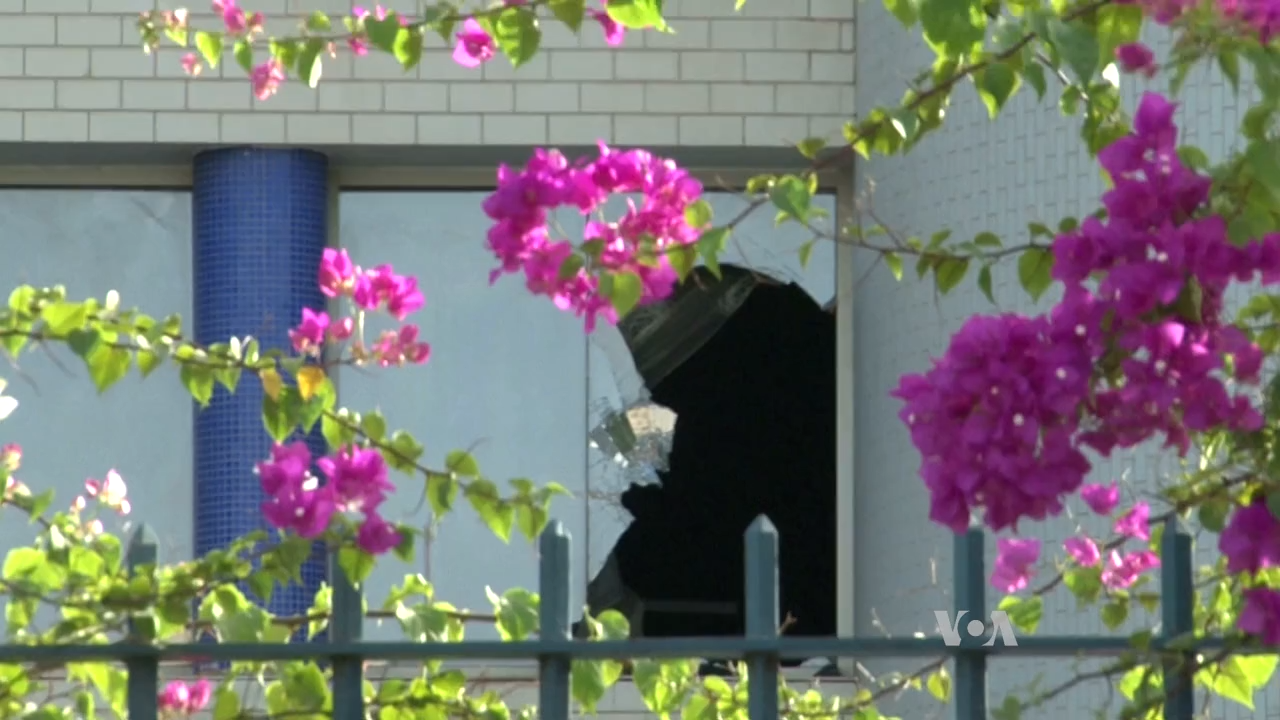
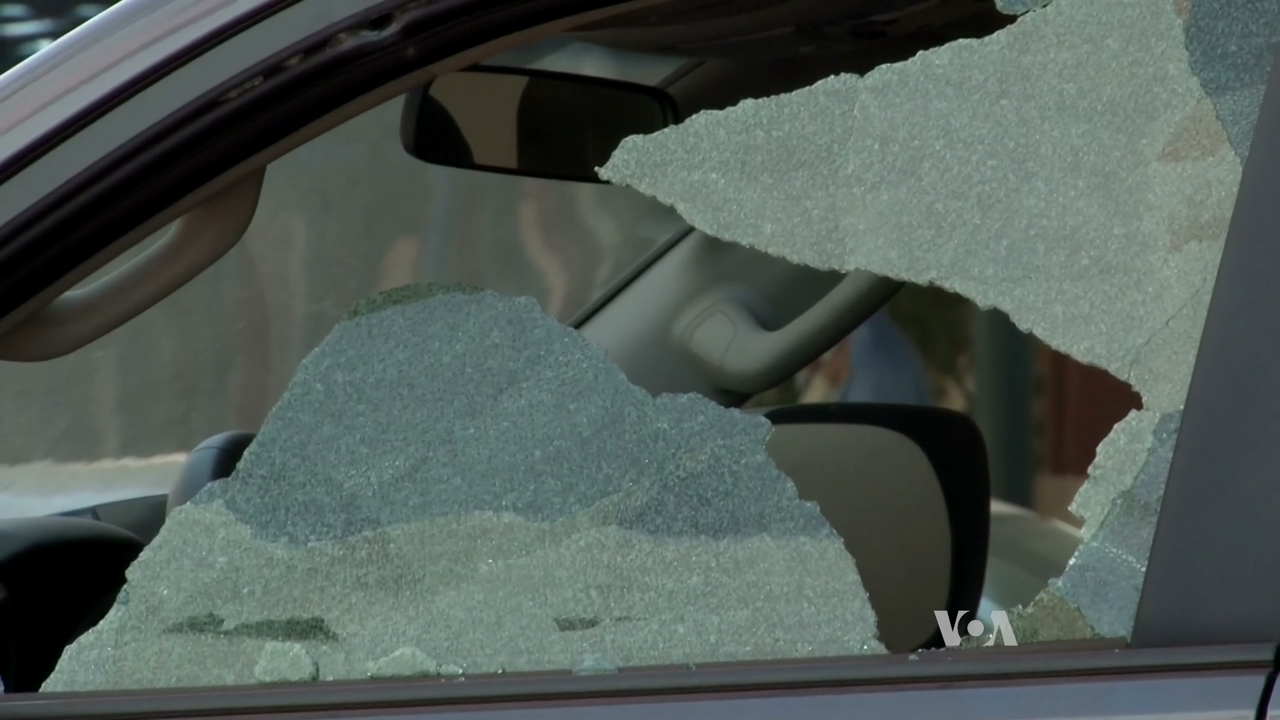
Damage in Bamako after the attack

Two gunmen arrived at the hotel between 7 and 7:30 a.m.; according to a hotel employee, the men were driving a vehicle with diplomatic license plates. Malian army commander Modibo Nama Traoré said that at least 10 gunmen had stormed the hotel shouting "Allahu Akbar" before firing on guards and taking hostages. Guinean singer Sekouba Bambino, who was in the hotel but escaped, reported that the perpetrators were speaking in English. This was supported by many other witnesses, who said the attackers spoke something that was neither Arabic nor local.

Kassim Traoré, a Malian journalist, said that hostages were asked to recite the shahada in order to get released. Soon after, the Armed and Security Forces of Mali special forces stormed the hotel. According to the hotel operators, 125 guests and 13 employees were inside the hotel when the siege began. According to General Didier Dacko of the Malian Army, "about 100 hostages" were taken at the beginning of the siege. The Associated Press and Al Jazeera have reported that in the chaos of the initial attack, many present were able to escape, but around 170 people were held hostage.

A delegation of the Organisation internationale de la Francophonie was in the hotel at the time of the attack. Ten Chinese citizens, twenty Indian citizens, about a dozen American citizens including personnel from the US Embassy, seven Algerian citizens including six diplomats, two Russian citizens, two Moroccan citizens, seven Turkish Airlines staff, and an unknown number of French citizens were reported to have been among those taken hostage. Two Canadian mining executives were some of the last hostages rescued. Twelve crew from Air France, who were also in the hotel, were extracted and safely released. Three United Nations staff were safely removed from the hotel, but it remains unknown how many were caught inside. Several delegates from MINUSMA were present at the hotel attending a meeting on the peace process in the country. More than 100 hostages were freed.

The UN peacekeepers supported the Malian Armed Forces by reinforcing security around the hotel. 25 U.S. government personnel were in Bamako at the time of the attack, some of whom assisted Malian forces in evacuating civilians to secure locations. A group of five U.S. Diplomatic Security Service and Department of Defense personnel were the first and only responders to enter the building. They continued to clear the hotel and rescue isolated hostages until the arrival of more forces. Two of these personnel were decorated for their role in rescuing hostages, with U.S. Army Sergeant First Class Kyle Morgan receiving the Distinguished Service Cross for exceptional heroism, and Marine Gunnery Sergeant Jarad Stout receiving the Silver Star. Another member helped at the Joint Operations Center, which was set up to respond to the incident. A further 12 U.S. citizens were rescued by Malian security forces, according to AFRICOM.

Although there were earlier reports of more gunmen involved in the hotel attack, the investigation determined that in fact there were only two attackers.

== Victims ==
Deaths by nationality
Country	Number	Ref.
Mali	6	
Russia	6	
China	3	
Belgium	2	
United States	1	
Senegal	1	
Israel	1	
Total	20	

Twenty people were murdered in the attack: six Malians, six Russians, three Chinese, two Belgians, one American, one Israeli and one Senegalese. Among the victims were:

- Geoffrey Dieudonné, a Belgian counselor with the Brussels-Wallonia regional parliament.
- Three Chinese executives from the China Railway Construction Corporation.
- Six Russians, all employees of the Volga-Dnepr Airlines cargo company (a navigator, a flight radio operator, a flight engineer, a load master, and two aircraft mechanics).
- Anita Ashok Datar, an American of Takoma Park, Maryland, who was a senior manager at the Palladium Group (an international development consulting firm), a former Peace Corps volunteer, and expert in global public health who was an expert in family planning, reproductive health and HIV in Africa and Asia.
- Shmuel Benalal, an Israeli education consultant and president of Telos Group Ltd.

== Responsibility ==
While the attack was under way, Al-Mourabitoun claimed responsibility for it via Twitter, although its claim has not been verified. In an audio recording provided to Al Jazeera, the group also claimed responsibility and said that it had undertaken the attack jointly with al-Qaeda in the Islamic Maghreb (AQIM). Al-Qaeda in the Islamic Maghreb is an armed force that defines itself as an Islamic-based militant organization whose ultimate goal is to create an Islamic State in Algeria. Al-Mourabitoun is made up of Tuaregs and Arabs from northern Mali and is affiliated with AQIM. The group, led by Mokhtar Belmokhtar, formed in 2013 and is based in the Sahara Desert.

The Macina Liberation Front also claimed responsibility for the attack.

== Reactions ==
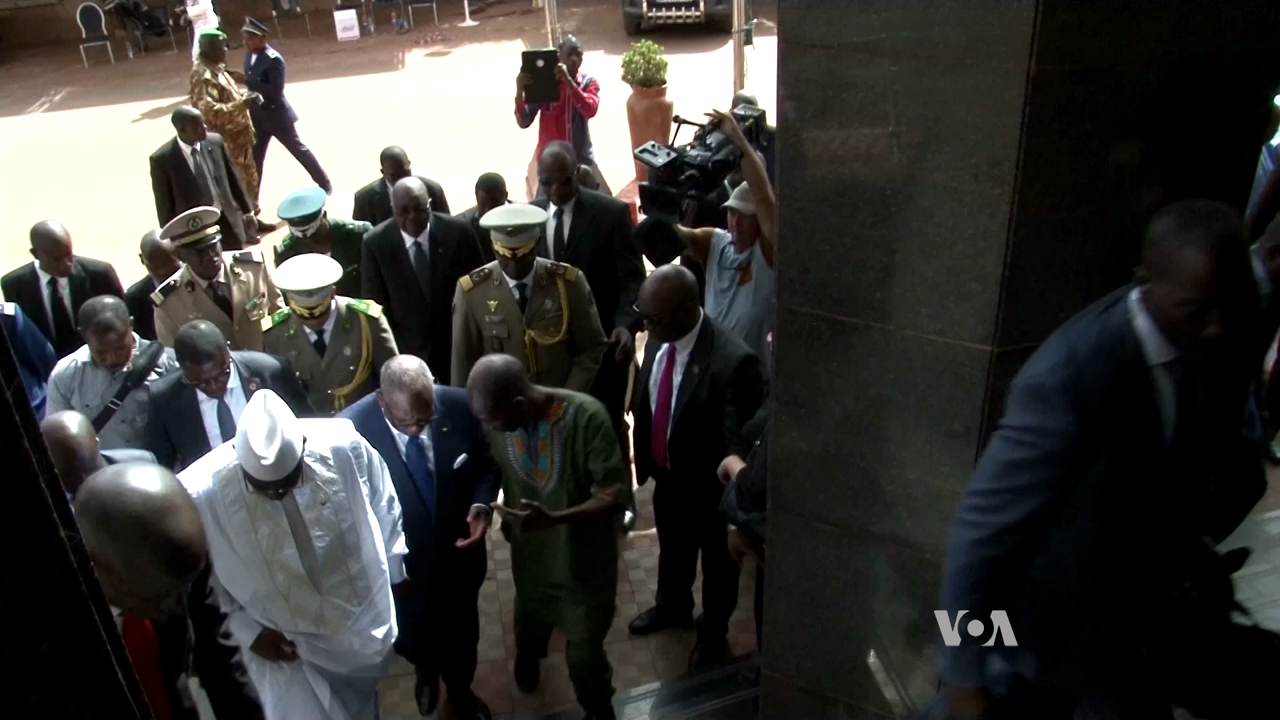
Malian president Ibrahim Boubacar Keïta visiting the hotel after the attack

Malian President Ibrahim Boubacar Keïta cut short his visit to Chad in order to return to Bamako and coordinate the response. Mali also declared a 10-day state of emergency.

In a press conference, French Foreign Minister Laurent Fabius stated that France will take "all steps necessary" to fight the attackers in Bamako. A crisis unit was set up in the embassy. Forty officers from the National Gendarmerie's GIGN special forces unit, along with ten forensic and criminal officers, were sent to "advise and support" Malian security forces. Air France flights to and from Bamako were suspended for the day.

The United Nations Security Council condemned the attack. Australia advised its citizens not to travel to Mali and advised those in country to leave. Similar warnings were made by the Foreign Office in the United Kingdom advised British nationals to remain indoors and follow the instructions of the local government authorities. The United States condemned the attack and confirmed continuing coordination of its officials in the country to verify the location of all citizens in Mali and that it was "prepared to assist the Malian government in the coming days as it investigates this tragic terrorist attack." The embassy urged its citizens to shelter in place, follow government instructions and contact their family.

The Russian province of Ulyanovsk Oblast, home of five of the victims, declared 23 November a mourning day.

Malian President Ibrahim Boubacar Keita later declared three days of national mourning in Mali. Ahead of the three days of national mourning, the chairman of the West African regional bloc Ecowas, Senegal's President Macky Sall, visited Bamako to show support. He said on Sunday: "Mali will never be alone in this fight, we are all committed because we are all involved." Senegal, Mauritania and Guinea are also observing the mourning.

== Investigation ==
Three days after the attack, the Malian government released photographs of the corpses of the two attackers. The men were clean-shaven and appeared to be in their 20s. One "had visible bullet wounds to his upper body." The authorities have not been able to identify the men and urged members of the public with information to come forward. Al Mourabitoun, which claimed responsibility for the attack, said that the men were Abdul Hakim al-Ansari and Mu'adh al-Ansari, but this claim has not been verified.

On 22 November 2015, two separate police sources speaking to Agence-France Presse on condition of anonymity said that "two foreigners" along with "three or four accomplice" were responsible for the attack.

On 27 November 2015, Malian special forces arrested two Malian men in their early 30s on the outskirts of Bamako in connection with the attack. The men were linked to the attack by a mobile phone found at the scene of the attack.

== See also ==
- 2003 Marriott Hotel bombing
- 2008 Islamabad Marriott Hotel bombing
- 2008 Mumbai attacks
- 2012 Malian coup d'état
- 2015 Corinthia Hotel attack
- 2016 Bamako attack
