= March 2015 Bamako shooting =

Terrorist attack in Bamako, Mali

Coordinates: 12.6333°N 7.9833°W

- Location: Hippodrome, Bamako, Mali
- Date: March 7, 2015
- Attack type: Shooting
- Deaths: 5
- Injuries: 9
- Perpetrator: Al-Mourabitoun

In an attack on March 7, 2015, five people were shot dead and nine wounded in a restaurant on a busy street of Bamako, the capital of Mali. Two of those killed were Malians, and the others French and Belgian respectively.

== Perpetrators ==
The jihadist group Al-Mourabitoun has claimed responsibility for the attack.

== Shooting ==
On March 7, 2015, local police in Bamako, responded to an attack at La Terrace restaurant of Hippodrome district. The police department stated "This is a terrorist attack, although we're waiting for clarification. Provisionally, there are four dead – one French national, a Belgian and two Malians". Victims were taken to Gabriel Toure hospital.

Deaths by nationality
Country	Number
Mali	2
France	1
Belgium	1
Total	4

== Reactions ==
François Hollande, the President of France, condemned the attack as "cowardly". The French Foreign Minister, Laurent Fabius, said that France would strengthen Mali's resolve to "fight terrorism in all its forms". Didier Reynders, the Belgian Foreign Minister, also condemned the attack and said it may have been an act of terrorism.
