= Fafa skirmish =

2019 Mali War skirmish in Fafa, Mali

- Part of Mali War
Date	July 17, 2019
Location	Fafa, Mali
Result	Franco-Malian victory

Belligerents
Mali; France	Islamic State in the Greater Sahara

Casualties and losses
1 killed 2 injured	9 killed 2 captured

On July 17, 2019, Franco-Malian forces clashed with the Islamic State in the Greater Sahara near Fafa, in Mali.

== Prelude ==
Fafa is a small village near the tripoint area between Mali, Burkina Faso, and Niger. Throughout the Mali War, it has been subject to attacks and influence from jihadist groups such as Jama'at Nasr al-Islam wal Muslimin and the Islamic State in the Greater Sahara. The town is situated north of the Malian-controlled border town of Labbézanga, which was also used by French forces during Operation Barkhane.

== Skirmish ==
On July 16, 2019, a convoy of around ten Malian vehicles left the border post at Labbezanga on the way to Gao was ambushed between the villages of Fafa and Bentia. At the time, Fafa was a hotbed of ISGS activity. The Malian army sent out reinforcements from Ansongo and Labbezanga, and later French forces were dispatched. Clashes broke out between the Franco-Malian contingent and ISGS, with the latter fleeing after an hour and a half of fighting. As the jihadists fled, a French drone followed a motorcycle to a clearing with around fifteen ISGS fighters, and launched an airstrike. Malian forces then launched reconnaissance missions at the scene of the fighting.

== Aftermath ==
The Malian government announced on July 18 that one soldier was killed, and two injured, in the initial ambush. They also claimed five jihadists were killed. That same day, the French government announced around ten jihadists were killed, with the French Armed Forces clarifying the toll of "nine dead, two captured, and numerous resources seized."
