= 2026 Mali offensives =

Militant attacks

- Part of the Mali War during the War in the Sahel
- The military situation in Mali and neighboring countries as of 30 April 2026. For a detailed map, see here.
Date	25 April 2026 – present (6 months, 2 weeks and 1 day)
Location	Bamako, Bourem, Gao, Kati, Kidal, Mopti, Sévaré, Ménaka
Result	Killing of Sadio Camara; Smaller-scale offensive on 4 July and battle of Anéfis
Territorial changes	Kidal under FLA control until October 2026; Tessit under JNIM control; JNIM alleges partial or full control over Mopti, Sevare and Gao; Kati and Bamako under Malian control

Belligerents
Azawad Liberation Front; Jama'at Nusrat al-Islam wal-Muslimin: Islamic State; Sahel Province (from April 28)	Alliance of Sahel States; Mali; Burkina Faso; Niger; Russia

Commanders and leaders
Alghabass Ag Intalla; Bilal Ag Acherif; Iyad Ag Ghali; Amadou Koufa (Islamic State) Abu al-Bara al-Sahrawi	(Mali) Assimi Goita (Mali) Abdoulaye Maiga; Sadio Camara X (Mali) Modibo Koné (WIA) (Russia) Andrey Averyanov (Russia) Vladimir Selivyorstov

Units involved
Unknown	Mali Armed Forces; Malian Air Force; Russian Armed Forces; Africa Corps

Strength
/ 10,000—12,000 (per Africa Corps)	(Mali) Unknown (Russia) 400–2,000

Casualties and losses
200+ killed (per Malian Armed Forces); 2,500+ killed (per Africa Corps); 305+ killed in Russian airstrikes (per Russia)	23 killed (in Kati); 16 wounded (per Mali) several dozen killed (in Kidal, per FLA); 200+ captured (in Kidal, per FLA); 1 Africa Corps Mil Mi-35 helicopter (with crew and mobile fire group killed)

Since 25 April 2026, a series of joint coordinated attacks have been carried out by Azawad Liberation Front (FLA) and Jama'at Nusrat al-Islam wal-Muslimin (JNIM) across multiple locations in Mali. The JNIM fighters launched attacks in Bourem, Bamako, Kati, Sévaré, Senou and Mopti. The FLA took control of Kidal and parts of Gao. In early October 2026 the FLA retreated from Kidal and the city came back under the control of the Malian army.

The Islamic State's Sahel Province (IS-SP) also launched its own attacks under the cover of the FLA–JNIM attacks, taking control of Labbezanga and launching an assault on Menaka, that was repulsed.

The coordinated attacks are the largest offensive in the Mali War since the 2012 rebellion. There have been joint attacks by JNIM and the FLA in Azawadi-claimed territory, while in southern and central Mali, JNIM has acted independently. The offensive targeted government centers in Bamako and Kati, which resulted in the killing of Defense Minister Sadio Camara and injury of intelligence chief Modibo Koné, as well as the cities of Kidal, Gao, Sévaré and Mopti. Malian troops and Russia's Africa Corps subsequently withdrew from Kidal, Aguelhok and Tessalit in the Kidal Region; Tessit in the Gao Region; and Ber in the Tombouctou Region. The Malian government and Russia's Africa Corps described the attacks as a coup attempt that has been thwarted.

The offensives were renewed on 4 July 2026, when coordinated attacks occurred across various locations including Anéfis and Kenioroba. The attacks also plunged the Malian state into a water and power crisis.

== Background ==
Mali has been embroiled in a civil war since 2012, initiated by a loose coalition of secular Tuareg rebels from the National Movement for the Liberation of Azawad (MNLA) with support from various jihadist groups, including Ansar Dine and Al-Qaeda in the Islamic Maghreb. In January 2012, these groups launched an offensive against government forces in northern Mali. By April, the MNLA had seized control of Kidal, Gao and Timbuktu, proclaiming the independence of the State of Azawad.

The offensive prompted Malian officers to overthrow President Amadou Toumani Touré and seek French intervention via Operation Serval, which routed the jihadists at Konna and reversed the gains made by the Islamist faction of the alliance. Although the Algiers Accords were signed between the Malian government and the Coordination of Azawad Movements in 2015, the implementation of the agreement stalled, and fighting also spread from northern to central Mali from late 2014.

Malian president Ibrahim Boubacar Keïta, elected in 2013, failed to implement reforms to strengthen the Malian state. Foreign military missions such as MINUSMA and the French-led Operation Barkhane also failed to fully suppress rebel and jihadist groups, some of which formed the al-Qaeda affiliated alliance Jama'at Nusrat al-Islam wal-Muslimin (JNIM) in 2017. Following protests in response to alleged fraud in the 2020 parliamentary election, Keïta was removed in a coup led by Assimi Goita, who became the military ruler of Mali after another coup in 2021.

Following similar coups in Burkina Faso and Niger, the three countries asked UN and French forces to leave, and formed the Alliance of Sahel States in 2023. The war in Mali drastically escalated after the withdrawal of UN and French troops. Mali subsequently requested the assistance of the Russian Wagner Group for the Kidal offensive in 2023.

Following a setback at the Battle of Tinzaouaten in 2024, which was won by the Azawad Liberation Front (a descendant of the MNLA) and JNIM, the Wagner Group was replaced by the Russian Africa Corps, who have since exploited the country's minerals and killed civilians in areas frequented by the FLA and JNIM. Following 2024, JNIM opened a new front to isolate Bamako and other urban areas in western and southern Mali from economic centers and supply lines. The group targeted the mining region of Kayes and towns that connect Mali to Senegal, Mauritania, Guinea and Ivory Coast, the primary sources of Malian fuel imports. This was part of wider pressure by JNIM in southern Mali.

In July 2025, JNIM launched attacks on the cities of Kayes and Nioro du Sahel. In September 2025, JNIM imposed a fuel blockade by attacking transport routes from the borders to government-controlled southern cities. As the south houses the majority of Mali's population, food production and economic centers, the blockade of fuel imports crippled the Malian state's ability to function.

Prior to these attacks, a truce between JNIM and the Malian government had freed 100 JNIM prisoners in exchange for a lifting of the fuel blockade. Signed in late March, the truce was intended to last until Eid al-Adha (locally called Tabaski) in late May. The Malian government later denied releasing any prisoners, claiming the reports were "completely unfounded and lacking any reliable source."

== Attacks ==
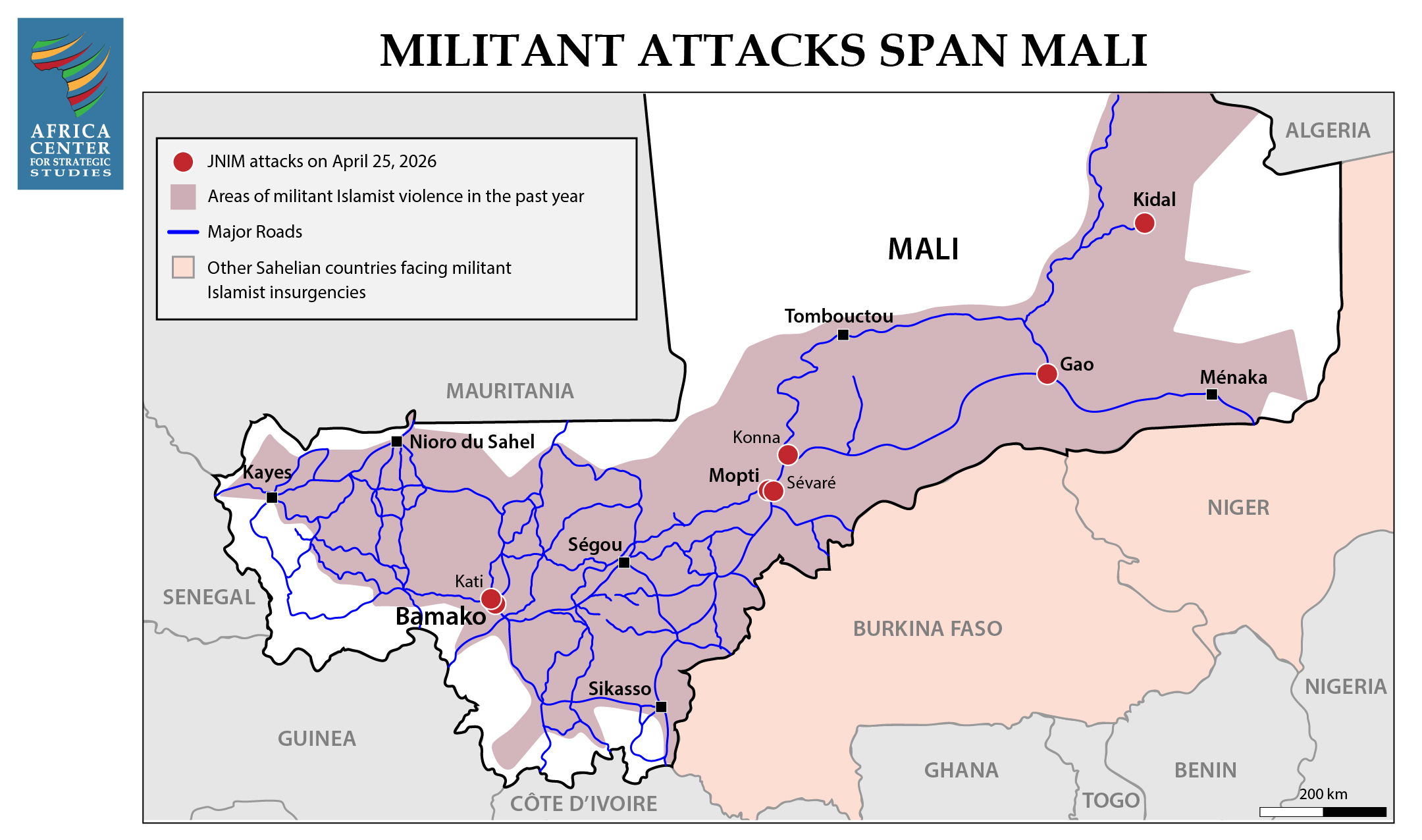
A map of JNIM attacks on 25 April

On 25 April, shortly before 5:20, two explosions and heavy gunfire were reported near Kati, the main military base located on the outskirts of Bamako (which houses Malian leader Assimi Goita). JNIM fighters drove a car bomb into the house of Defense Minister Sadio Camara, killing him and members of his family. Fighting occurred in the neighborhood of Mamaribougou.

At around 6:00, men dressed in Malian army uniforms entered the town of Kati. Witnesses also reported that Russian mercenaries were involved in fighting near the Modibo Keita International Airport in Bamako, where three helicopters were reportedly seen patrolling amid sustained gunfire. Gunfire was simultaneously reported in Gao, Sévaré, Kidal and Mopti. Africa Corps had at least 400 personnel in the region.

=== Kidal and northern Mali ===
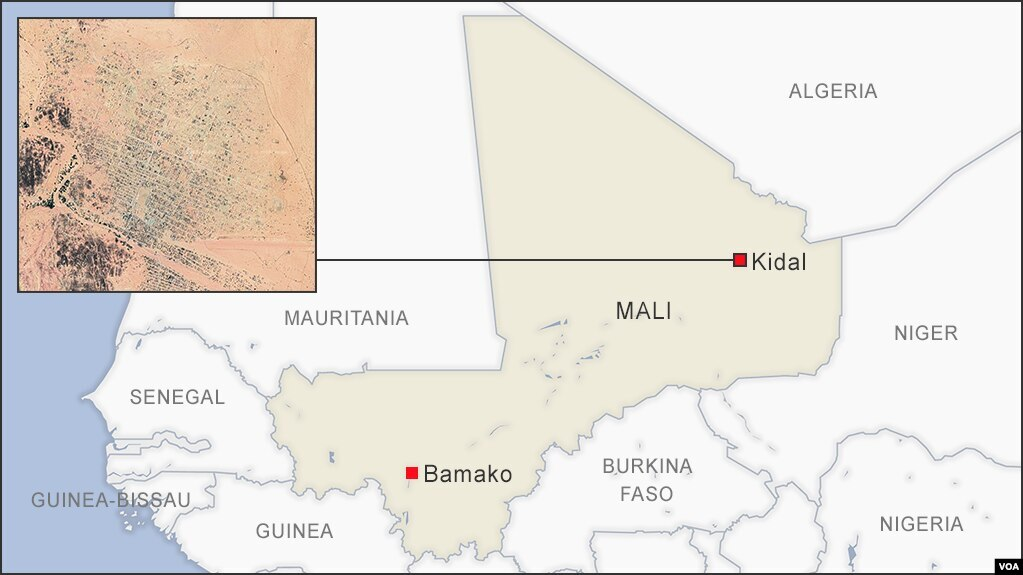
Rebel forces recaptured Kidal, which had been under government control since 2023

According to the FLA, checkpoints at the entrance of Kidal changed hands within the first hour and fighting was concentrated at the city's police station. The station's perimeter was breached that afternoon and control changed hands. Footage showed FLA fighters entering the residence of the Governor of Kidal General El Hadj Ag Gamou, who had been appointed by the junta in 2023. The FLA released a statement claiming to be in control of most of Kidal, and claimed responsibility for the attacks in Bamako.

FLA Spokesman Mohamed Elmaouloud Ramadane claimed control over locations in Kidal and Gao, while calling on the "authorities of Burkina Faso and Niger to stay out of the ongoing events in Mali." He later told Agence France-Presse (AFP) that the FLA had taken control of most of Kidal, with Gamou having taken refuge in a former MINUSMA camp. A former Kidal mayor confirmed to the Associated Press that gunmen took control of neighborhoods in the city, leading to clashes with the army. Security sources cited by Reuters indicated that JNIM was also involved, reportedly fighting alongside the FLA in Kidal.

Kidal was fully under FLA control by the end of 25 April, although Malian and Russian soldiers remained entrenched in the former MINUSMA camp. Resistance continued on the outskirts of Kidal from Malian and Russian soldiers until the evening of 25 April, when they were evacuated to the MINUSMA base.

On 26 April, France 24 reported that FLA rebels and a local politician told AFP that new clashes had occurred in Kidal between rebels and government troops backed by Russian mercenaries. Gunfire was reported on 26 April at the garrison in Kati, where JNIM attackers were present in unfinished buildings and surrounding hills, despite Malian army claims of full control over the town. The FLA later announced that they reached a deal to allow the withdrawal of Russian Africa Corps forces from Kidal, granting the rebels full control of the area.

An unnamed FLA spokesperson stated that after negotiations with elements of the encircled Africa Corps detachment at the base, they were to be withdrawn and escorted to the town of Tessalit. An Africa Corps convoy was subsequently observed departing the former MINUSMA camp under FLA escort, followed by the withdrawal of Malian soldiers. Malian and Russian soldiers set fire to the camp before departing. The FLA subsequently gained full control over Kidal, and the Malian flag no longer flew over the city.

On the night of 26 April, Army Chief of Staff Oumar Diarra confirmed in a televised announcement that the Malian army had left the city and that its forces were re-positioning in Anafif. The Africa Corps later confirmed its withdrawal from Kidal on 27 April. It was also reported that the Africa Corps withdrew from the Aguelhok and Tessalit communes adjacent to Kidal. Algerian mediation between the FLA and the Africa Corps soldiers helped ensure the peaceful withdrawal.

Also on 27 April, Malian and Russian troops withdrew from Labbezanga in the Gao Region, a border post on the Mali–Niger border, which was subsequently occupied by Islamic State – Sahel Province (ISSP) members. ISSP also began amassing forces around Ménaka, the capital of the Ménaka Region, and launched probing attacks on military positions around the city. On 29 April, Reuters reported that Ménaka was under government control and that ISSP militants had retreated from the town.

On 30 April, the government of Niger announced that the unified forces of the Alliance of Sahel States had "conducted intense air campaigns" against jihadist and separatist forces in the hours after the 25 April attacks in Kidal, Gao and Ménaka, which in addition to Mali involved Burkina Faso and Niger. On 1 May, the FLA and JNIM took control of the military base outside of Tessalit in the Kidal Region, near the Algeria–Mali border, after Malian and Russian troops withdrew southward.

On 27 May, the army began a bombing campaign around Kidal, using drones and Su-24 aircraft, destroying a mosque and damaging several homes, including that of FLA President Bilal Ag Acherif. On 15 June, the seven civilians were killed by government airstrikes targeting terrorists in Kimya, near Hombori.

On 4 July, a renewed offensive began, with insurgents attacking Anafif and Gao. The FLA claimed responsibility for the attacks in northern Mali, and also claimed that its forces had entered Anafif, later culminating with the alleged capture of Anefiis and later Konna in the Mopti region. Additional assaults hit Kouakourou, Bandiagara-area positions, Kati military base, and Kenieroba prison. Fighting occurred in Gao as well. The Malian army claimed to have repelled an attack in Sévaré but issued no details on the other locations.

=== Central and southern Mali ===
JNIM was reportedly involved in attacking Sévaré and Kati, where an FLA presence was not reported. Other clashes took place between JNIM and the Malian armed forces in Base 101 in Senou. The road connecting Bamako and Sikasso also fell under a JNIM blockade. A civilian told RFI JNIM fighters killed two people during the initial attack on Mopti. Later that evening, RFI's Mandenkan Fulfulde bureau cited civilian sources reporting that shooting between JNIM and Malian forces was still ongoing in Mopti at 17:00.

By the end of 25 April, Malian forces reportedly retained control of Kati and Bamako, although RFI noted that "the situation could change overnight" in those cities. The status of some soldiers and officials, including Sadio Camara, remained unknown. On 25 April, in Gao and Sévaré, control was divided between jihadists and government forces. JNIM claimed to have taken "complete control" of Mopti. Libération claimed that "the city of Gao was mostly under rebel control, although Malian forces held the Gao airport".

Gunfire was reported on 26 April at the garrison in Kati, where JNIM attackers were present in unfinished buildings and surrounding hills, despite Malian army claims of full control over the town. RFI reported a "fragile calm" in both Gao and Sévaré on 26 April. The city of Sévaré remained split under Malian and rebel control, with brief clashes heard early in the morning of 26 April in Sévaré and Kati. JNIM claimed "full control" of Mopti in statements. In Sévaré, fighting involved gunmen and control appears divided, with rebels pushing in before some withdrawals or pushes back. Witnesses described urban gunfire and bodies in streets. By the evening, Sévaré was calm, but rebel fighters were seen north of the city.

The Malian government announced that curfews would be implemented in cities across the country, and that armed checkpoints would be increased in and out of cities. On 27 April, JNIM said the Malian military had begun to withdraw from Tessit, Gao Region, with the soldiers agreeing to hand over their weapons in exchange for a safe passage from the town. Negotiated withdrawals of Malian and Africa Corps forces also took place in Ber, Léré, and at the lucrative Intahaka gold mine. In the evening, two explosions were heard near the airport area in Bamako after a military convoy was seen approaching the airport. On 29 April, the FLA attacked Gourma-Rharous.

On 6 May, JNIM attacked the Kenieroba Central Prison in southern Mali, which houses 2,500 inmates, including militants from the group. On 7 May, JNIM killed at least 30 people in coordinated attacks on the villages of Korikori and Gomossogou in retaliation to actions by the Dan Na Ambassagou militia. On 8 May, JNIM continued their attacks in central Mali in the villages of Kouroude and Dougara, killing an additional 40 people. On 12 May, JNIM attacked the village of Kendié and looted most of the shops.

==== Siege of Bamako ====
On 28 April, JNIM spokesman Bina Diarra announced in a Bambara-language video that JNIM would be blockading Bamako starting that day. On 30 April, JNIM claimed that it took control of two checkpoints outside of Bamako, and also that it captured the military camp near Hombori in central Mali, which the Africa Corps denied. On the same day it was reported that JNIM had set up its own checkpoints around the capital.

More than 250 buses and private vehicles were stranded on the roads outside the capital, and the Malian military launched operations to restore access on two critical national highways. There were no fuel shortages reported as of 2 May. On 6 May, JNIM ambushed and burnt several Moroccan fruit trucks traveling from Bougouni to Bamako. On 1 June 2026, a bus travelling the Bamako-Kayes highway was hit by a landmine placed by JNIM militants, killing 8 and injuring 42.

=== Resumption of offensives ===
The FLA and JNIM renewed their offensives after almost a two-month break on 4 July. In the 5th, they took the majority of the town of Anéfis and its surroundings from Malian and Russian forces, with a relief convoy from Africa Corps being routed near Tabrichat and a Mi-24 being shot down. After the initial reinforcements were defeated, a second wave arrived and recaptured the town on 9 July. On 12 July, Mali revealed the casualties of the attack, claiming that about 30 soldiers died in the fighting and another 60 were injured. They also claimed that a hundred militants were killed in the fighting, and twelve rebel vehicles were destroyed.

On 17 July, FLA militants attacked a convoy returning from Anefis, killing 50 soldiers and taking 20 prisoners. The Russian African Corps claimed to have inflicted heavy losses on the rebels during the fighting for Anefis and also claimed the death of Mbarek Ag Akli, chief of staff and first deputy head of the FLA, but this information was later denied.

After the rout of the Malian army against the JNIM jihadists on 18 July on the city of Kouakourou, Kouakourou has been emptied of its inhabitants and occupied by JNIM jihadists.

On 26 July 2026, forces of the Russian Africa Corps, supported by the Malian army claim to have ambushed and eliminated at least 8 militants near the town of Niono. Footage of the ambush was released by the Africa Corps on telegram.

JNIM claims to have seized a significant number of motorcycles belonging to the Africa Corps, which were abandoned following the deaths and injuries of several Russian mercenaries during the repelling of an advance attempt by one of their patrols near the village of Hadj Wéré, north of Niono (Ségou region), on Sunday, July 26.

JNIM claims to have taken control of a Dozo militia post in the village of Kolodougou Koura, south of Niono, in the Ségou region, on the evening of July 30.

On August 6, JNIM attacked a government military camp in San. During the attack, 10 soldiers and 40 militants were killed.

On August 9, militants from JNIM claims to have taken control of an Army barracks in San, Segou. Local sources reportedly, clashes ongoing few hours. At least 10 soldiers of Malian army were killed.

On 13 August, 82 Malian prisoners of war have been freed by FLA. Mohamed Elmaouloud Ramadane, a spokesperson for the FLA, said that the release was conducted for “strictly humanitarian” reasons.

In the end of August, FLA have freed about 60 Malian soldiers in exchange for one of their own generals.

On September 4, the Malian Army announced that insurgent gathering points in the village of Ouertedjach, east of Aguelhok, were targeted in airstrikes.

On September 5 JNIM claimed to have taken control of a military post of the Malian army located near the Malian capital.

On September 10, more than 100 soldiers were killed in an JNIM attack on a military camp in Dioura, 92 were captured.

== Casualties and losses ==
The Malian government did not release an official death toll, although a hospital source said that the attack in Kati killed 23 soldiers and civilians. Government spokesperson General Issa Ousmane Coulibaly stated that 16 people, including soldiers and civilians, were injured.

On September 7, JNIM attacked the Africa corps, killing several Russian soldiers and sharing footage of the dead. Russian Telegram channel linked to Wagner confirmed the losses.

An Azawad Liberation Front (FLA) spokesperson released video footage allegedly showing the downing of a Malian Air Force Mil Mi-35 helicopter in the Gao Region. Subsequent reports revealed that the helicopter belonged to the Africa Corps and that both the crew and the mobile fire group on board were killed. There is evidence that one Malian Air Force Mi-24 helicopter was captured by the FLA on the ground. Within Kidal, the FLA stated the several dozen Malian soldiers were killed in clashes following Russian withdrawal. An additional 200 soldiers were captured.

Defense Minister Sadio Camara was targeted by a car bombing which destroyed his residence in Kati, killing him alongside his second wife and two grandchildren. Some nearby buildings, including a mosque, were also destroyed by the bombing, killing several civilians. Camara's fate was initially the subject of conflicting reports, with staff initially claiming he was safe. His death was confirmed by the government on 26 April, which announced two days of countrywide mourning.

According to RFI, President Assimi Goita was evacuated from Kati to a secure military camp, while intelligence chief Modibo Koné and Army Chief of Staff Oumar Diarra were reportedly wounded, with Koné sustaining multiple gunshot wounds in the fighting at Kati. Conflicting reports emerged of Koné's death on 26 April, and others saying he was still alive as of 28 April but in deteriorating condition.

The location of Assimi Goita was unknown until April 28. His first public appearance since the start of the attacks was in a visit to a hospital in Bamako to the hospitalized family of Sadio Camara.

Oumar Diarra claimed on ORTM that over 200 attackers were "neutralized", while a large amount of equipment was recovered. In a post on X, the Africa Corps claimed that 10,000 to 12,000 JNIM and FLA fighters participated in the attacks. They alleged that over 1,000 insurgents were killed, including over 200 in Bamako, 500 in Gao, 300 in Kati, and 200 in Kidal, and that over 100 vehicles were destroyed. On 28 April, the Russian Ministry of Defence released footage of airstrikes carried out by Russian personnel, claiming that at least 305 militants had been killed in recent strikes. On 2 May, Malian state TV reported that over 200 militants were killed in targeted airstrikes the prior morning; Xinhua News Agency reported that four weaponized trucks and 60 motorcycles were also destroyed.

== Response ==
=== Government response ===
The Malian military confirmed on 25 April that it was clashing with unidentified "terrorist groups" in the capital and other parts of the country. An official statement from the General Staff of the Armed Forces informed the public that "unidentified armed terrorist groups" had targeted locations and barracks across the country. By 11:00, the army announced that the situation was under control, though "sweeping operations" remained ongoing. In Bamako district, a three-day curfew from 21:00 to 6:00 was imposed by Governor Abdoulaye Coulibaly.

Russia's Africa Corps said in a statement on 27 April that a coup attempt has been prevented, referring to it as a "Syrian scenario". The statement also claimed that strategic locations have been secured. The Financial Times reported that Africa Corps elements were in the process of withdrawing from northern Mali, mainly from Aguelhok and Tessalit, but also from Labbezanga and Tessit near the Nigerien frontier, amid the threat of encirclement. The Africa Corps also accused "Ukrainian mercenaries" and Western intelligence of involvement in the offensive, claiming that they had participated in operations around Kidal and Gao and had used Western-origin portable surface-to-air missiles.

In the days following the attack, tensions grew between Africa Corps officials and Malian officials, both sides perceiving the other as having betrayed them. A Malian official told RFI that Kidal governor El Hadj Ag Gamou had warned the Russians of an impending attack three days beforehand, and the Russians did not react. However, the Russians believed that they had fulfilled their end of the partnership by successfully defending Bamako airport from attacks.

On 4 May 2026, Goita issued a decree appointing himself to defense minister after former Defense Minister Camara's death on the first day of the offensive. Military chief Oumar Diarra was appointed minister delegate.

On 3 June 2026, the Malian government banned the use of certain motorcycles, that are the preferred means of transport for jihadist groups in the country.

==== Internal crackdowns ====
The military junta claimed that several Malian officers had contact with the jihadists. On 2 May, the Military Court of Bamako launched an investigation into five soldiers, including three active duty servicemen and one killed during the attacks, stating that there was "solid evidence" implicating them in the attacks. The slain suspect, Alassane Diallo, had been dismissed from the Malian army since 2012. The living officers were Sergeant Diakiridia Sodio and Warrant Officers Mamadou Keita and Moussa Diane. One suspect, a retired soldier named Soiba Diarra, was already known to the Malian court system as one of the soldiers implicated in the 2012 Malian counter-coup attempt. The suspects were arrested on 3 May, and one Malian officer said that up to ten others were arrested.

The court also accused politicians, including the exiled Oumar Mariko, of involvement. Mariko had visited JNIM-controlled territory to secure the release of four Malian soldiers prior to the attacks. He denied involvement. Two other opposition politicians, Mountaga Tall and Moussa Djire, were both arrested and detained by the Malian junta. Tall was abducted by hooded men likely from the state's security apparatus on 2 May; in December, he said that a sword of Damocles was hanging over him. On 4 May, Youssouf Daba Diawara, a close associate of Imam Mahmoud Dicko, was arrested by the Malian junta.

=== Militant response ===
An FLA field commander stated the offensive had been planned for months; he indicated that the rebels next intended to capture Gao, after which "Timbuktu will be easy to fall." JNIM later released a statement confirming its involvement in the attacks, claiming responsibility for attacks against the residence of Assimi Goita, Defense Minister Sadio Camara, the Kati military base, Mopti and other locations. FLA official Attaye Ag Mohamed confirmed joint coordination with, as did JNIM. The group also called on Russia to stay out of the conflict "for stable future relations". An FLA spokesman told AFP while in Paris on 29 April that they intend to capture Gao, Timbuktu and Ménaka. He also said that "the regime will fall, sooner or later," and that the group wants Russia to withdraw from Mali, though "We have no particular problem with Russia...Our problem is with the regime that governs Bamako."

To assure an alliance with JNIM, the FLA agreed to enforce Sharia law (albeit a softer version of it) in areas under their control.

There were reports of civilian-led lynchings of suspected Tuareg JNIM militants in Bamako and Kati in the aftermath of the 25 April attack. On 28 April, JNIM claimed that it is putting Bamako under a total siege and that it is retaliation for the city's residents helping the Malian army kill or capture JNIM militants.

== Reactions ==
=== Domestic ===
On 28 April, according to a statement by his office, Assimi Goita visited Russian ambassador Igor Gromyko and a hospital treating people wounded in the attacks, in his first appearances since the attacks began. In a televised speech later that day, he said that the situation was "of extreme gravity" but was "under control." He vowed to crackdown on rebels. Fousseynou Ouattara, the vice president of the Defense and Security Commission of Mali's National Transitional Council, said that the actions of the Africa Corps were "decisive" in preventing the overthrow of the Malian transitional government.

Malian Prime Minister Abdoulaye Maiga called the attacks "cowardly and barbaric" and said that their extensive scale suggested foreign funding. He added that the government would continue its fight against militant groups and claimed that the Malian army had killed hundreds of fighters. He then claimed that the 25 April attacks were "intended to overthrow the government, dismantle state institutions and end the transition process." An opposition party in exile, the Coalition of Forces for the Republic, said in a statement that the offensive has shown that the military junta has failed in its pledge to restore security and stability in Mali.

The Malian Football Federation postponed all Malian Première Division matches scheduled for 25 April.

=== International ===
==== Supranational ====
- African Union – Commission Chairman Mahmoud Ali Youssouf's office issued a post that read he "strongly condemns these acts, which risk exposing civilian populations to significant harm, and reaffirms the Commission's steadfast commitment to the promotion of peace, security, good governance, and stability in Mali."
- Alliance of Sahel States – The organization called the attacks "a monstrous plot backed by the enemies of the liberation of the Sahel." The unified force of the alliance, which was formed to counter jihadist groups in the region, conducted airstrikes after the attacks began.
- ECOWAS – The bloc denounced the attack and encouraged "all states, security forces, regional mechanisms and populations of West Africa" to unite against "this scourge".
- OIC – Secretary-General Hissein Brahim Taha posted that he is following "with great concern the military operations" that he "strongly condemned" the attacks for seriously endangering the "lives of civilians and threaten peace, security and stability."
- United Nations – Secretary‑General António Guterres expressed concern over the attack, strongly condemned the attacks, expressed solidarity with the Malian people, and stressed the need to protect civilians and civilian infrastructure.

==== States ====
- Algeria – On 27 April 2026, foreign minister Ahmed Attaf reaffirmed Algeria's firm support for the "unity of Mali, its land, people and institutions," while also "categorically rejecting all forms and manifestations of terrorism." Attaf stated that such attacks "cannot be justified or tolerated regardless of its motives and causes" and called for strengthening state cohesion in Mali as the best way to combat the phenomenon.
- Burkina Faso – Defense minister Celestin Simpore vowed to "hunt down" the "assassins" while speaking at the funeral of Sadio Camara.
- China – The government said it condemns terrorism in all forms and those who support it, and reaffirmed its strong backing for Mali's government in maintaining sovereignty, security and stability, as well as ensuring the safety of its people.
- France – The Foreign Ministry issued a statement that read "French nationals are advised to make arrangements to leave Mali temporarily as soon as possible on the commercial flights that are still available" and that "travel to Mali is still strongly discouraged, regardless of the reason."
- Morocco – Expressed solidarity with Mali. Some Moroccan news outlets also claimed the Polisario Front was aiding the rebels.
- Niger – Announced that it, Burkina Faso, and Mali "conducted intense air campaigns" against the attackers. A thousand people gathered in Niamey to "show solidarity with the Malian people", at an event organized by a coalition of civil society groups.
- Russia – The foreign ministry expressed concern over the "terrorist activity" and claimed that the attackers were possibly trained by Western security services. Kremlin press secretary Dmitry Peskov said that "Russia's presence there is, in fact, due to the need identified by the current government. Russia will continue, including in Mali, to combat extremism, terrorism and other harmful phenomena and will continue to provide ‌assistance to the current government."
- Saudi Arabia – The foreign ministry condemned the attacks, offered condolences and reaffirming its solidarity with the Malian government.
- Senegal – President Bassirou Diomaye Faye condemned the attacks, stating that his government and military would "work together with the countries of the sub-region toward the restoration of peace and security in our shared space."
- Turkey – The foreign ministry released a statement condemning the offensives as "terrorist attacks".
- United States – The embassy said that its citizens "should shelter in place and avoid travel to these destinations until further information becomes available." The State Department's Bureau of African Affairs condemned the attacks.

=== Non-state actors ===
- Jama'at Nusrat al-Islam wal-Muslimin: Through its Az-Zallaqa media wing, they called on Malians to begin an uprising against the junta and transition to Sharia law.

== Analysis ==
Liam Karr of the Critical Threats Project said that "one of the primary aims of JNIM's attacks in central and southern Mali was likely to degrade the Malian army's ability to coordinate a response to the attacks in northern Mali." He also said that the seizure of Kidal was one of the major aims of the FLA and JNIM offensive, and the main success of the offensive thus far. Regarding the attacks on top Malian officials, Karr suggested that JNIM and the FLA sought to assassinate three of the main five Malian officials to provoke a collapse of the junta or create conditions for its collapse.

Heni Nsaibia in ACLED said that both the recapture of Kidal by the rebels and assassination attempts on top Malian figures were major symbolic victories for the rebels.

Wassim Nasr, in a Q&A with the Combating Terrorism Center, said that the most important aspect of the FLA-JNIM alliance is that it was much more structured than the initial MNLA–jihadist alliance from 2012. However, he said that the governance of Kidal and the FLA's adherence to Shari'a will be a test for the relationship, as JNIM is the stronger group of the two. Nasr said that JNIM would not break with al-Qaeda publicly, but would instead distance itself from al-Qaeda's doctrine when governing as a public break would cause many young Fulani in JNIM to defect to the Islamic State.

Yvan Guaichoua, in an interview with Afrique XXI, said that the suppression of political dissent by the junta authorities since 2021 enabled the jihadist insurgency to grow and find partners in the FLA, and that the assassination of Camara and attacks on Kati, Bamako, and seizure of Kidal were the culmination of this. He called the attacks the "most monumental blow that a Malian regime has ever taken."
