= Modibo Koné =

Malian military officer (born 1977)

Director of the National Security Agency
- Incumbent
- Assumed office 11 June 2021

Minister of Security and Civil Protectionn
- In office 5 October 2020 – 24 May 2021

Personal details
- Born: 1977 Bamako, Mali
- Party: National Committee for the Salvation of the People (2020–2024)

Military service
- Rank: General
- Battles/wars: Mali War: Battle of Konna; 2020 Malian coup d'état; 2021 Malian coup d'état; 2026 Mali attacks (WIA)

Modibo Koné (born 1977) is a Malian politician and military officer who served as the director of National Security Agency since 2021. He was a prominent figure in the National Committee for the Salvation of the People (CNSP), which came to power in the 2021 Malian coup d'état. Koné is known for being one of the five main figures of the CNSP. He was seriously injured during the 2026 Mali attacks, and some Western media outlets reported his death. However, in August 2026, he made an official trip to Algiers, which silenced rumors of his death.

== Biography ==
Koné was born in Bamako, Mali in 1977. He was a graduate of the Kati Combined Arms Military School. After Kati, he continued his training at the Koulikoro Combined Arms Military School, and took training courses in China. After completing his training, Koné served in the Malian National Guard, where he fought against rebel groups. He was known to have been stationed in Konna at the start of the Mali War, and likely participated in the Battle of Konna. In October 2024, he was promoted to general.

Koné participated in the 2020 Malian coup d'état as part of the National Committee for the Salvation of the People (CNSP) as the third vice-president, behind Assimi Goïta and Bah Ndaw respectively. According to Jeune Afrique, sources close to Kone said that he was the mastermind behind the 2020 coup. In October 2020, Koné was appointed Minister of Security and Civil Protection in the transitional government of Moctar Ouane. In May 2021, both Koné and Defense Minister Sadio Camara were exiled from the new cabinet proposed by Ouane. Koné and Camara plotted alongside Goita to overthrow Ndaw, which was carried out that month.

Koné was one of the five main figures in the CNSP after the 2021 coup, alongside Camara, Goita, Malick Diaw, and Ismaël Wagué. At the time of the coup, he was a colonel. In October 2021, Koné was appointed head of the National State Security Agency (ANSE), the Malian intelligence services. In December 2025, an investigation published by Jeune Afrique showed a Malian government purchase of Turkish Bayraktar drones being signed off on by Koné's ANSE, an unusual occurrence as Camara's Defense Ministry was the traditional purchaser of foreign arms.

During the 2026 Mali attacks, Koné and Army Chief of Staff Oumar Diarra were severely injured after being shot in the chest in fighting at Kati amidst an attack by Jama'at Nusrat al-Islam wal-Muslimin (JNIM) forces. Koné reportedly died of his wounds on 26 April 2026. However, on 28 April, Serge Daniel of RFI reported that Kone was still alive, but his condition was rapidly deteriorating.

In August 2026, he made an official trip to Algeria alongside Malian Prime Minister Abdoulaye Maïga, putting an end to rumors about his death.
