= Killing of Sadio Camara =

Coordinated assassination to Sadio Camara

- Part of 2026 Mali offensives of the Mali War of the Sahel War
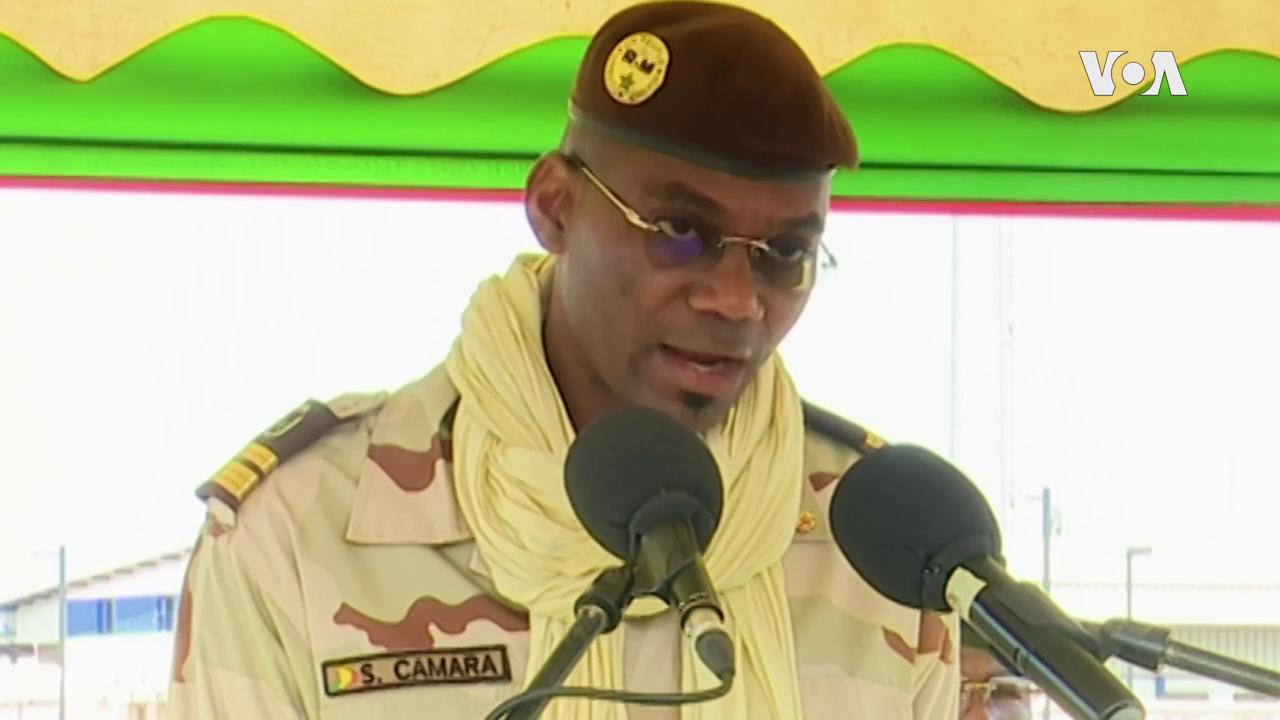
- Sadio Camara during a speech in August 2022
- Location: Kati, Koulikoro Region, Mali
- Date: 25 April 2026; 6 months ago (UTC+00:00 GMT)
- Target: Sadio Camara; Assimi Goïta
- Attack type: Assassination by suicide attack through a car bomb
- Weapon: Vehicle-borne
- Victims: Sadio Camara; Second wife of Camara; Two of Camara's grandchildren; Several civilians at a nearby mosque; Other assailants
- Perpetrators: Jama'at Nusrat al-Islam wal-Muslimin (JNIM); Azawad Liberation Front (FLA)

On 25 April 2026, General Sadio Camara, the Minister of Defense and Veterans Affairs of Mali, was assassinated during the start of the 2026 Mali offensives.

== Background ==
The 2026 Mali offensives started on 25 April, shortly before 5:20, two explosions and heavy gunfire were reported near Kati, the main military base located on the outskirts of Bamako, which houses Malian president Assimi Goïta.

== Assassination ==
Some time later after the attack on the military base, assailants of Jama'at Nusrat al-Islam wal-Muslimin (JNIM) and the Azawad Liberation Front (FLA) targeted Malian Minister of Defence Sadio Camara's compound. Euronews reported that Camara fought back and exchanged fire with the assailants. However, one suicide attacker drove a vehicle loaded with explosives directly into the residence of Camara. Firefights ensued and Camara survived the explosion and was rushed into a hospital, where he died due to his sustained injuries.

Agence France-Presse reported that three members of the Camara family – the second wife of Sadio and two of his grandchildren – were also killed in the attacks.

== Aftermath ==
By the end of 25 April, Malian forces reportedly retained control of Kati and Bamako, although Radio France Internationale (RFI) noted that "the situation could change overnight" in those cities. The status of some soldiers and officials, including Camara, remained unknown at that time.

The government confirmed his death the next day. Its spokesperson, General Issa Ousmane Coulibaly, announced that Mali would observe two days of mourning in his honor.

BBC News reported that the Camara family also reacted to the killing of Sadio Camara.

Camara was given a state funeral on 30 April. On 4 May, president Goïta appointed himself defence minister.

== Analysis ==
Nicolas Haque from Al Jazeera said, following about Sadio Camara, that "he was one of the most influential figures within the ruling military leadership and had been seen by some as a possible future leader of Mali" and that "his death is a major blow to the country’s armed forces".

== Other attacks in Kati ==
During the 2026 Mali attacks, National Security Director Modibo Koné and Army Chief of Staff Oumar Diarra were severely injured after being shot in the chest in fighting at Kati amidst an attack by JNIM forces. According to The Guardian, Koné was reportedly killed. However, on April 28 Serge Daniel of RFI reported that Kone was still alive, but his condition was rapidly deteriorating.
