= Az-Zallaqa Foundation =

Islamic militant propaganda media group

- Native name: مؤسسة الزلاقة
- Romanized name: Muʼassasat al-Zalāqah
- Industry: Jihadist Propaganda
- Founded: 2017
- Owner: Jama'at Nasr al-Islam wal-Muslimin

Az-Zallaqa Foundation (Arabic: مؤسسة الزلاقة, romanized: Muʼassasat al-Zalāqah) is a propaganda media foundation for the Al-Qaeda linked Islamist militant organization Jama'at Nasr al-Islam wal-Muslimin.

== History ==
Az-Zallaqa was established in 2017, first documenting attacks by JNIM militants in Mali against a United Nations Multidimensional Integrated Stabilization Mission in Mali Super Camp at Timbuktu Military Airport with mortars known as the 2017 Timbuktu attack. Since the establishment of the foundation, it has been the main outlet for JNIM's propaganda and news alerts online. The foundation also releases content alongside Al-Qaeda in the Islamic Maghreb's media outlet, Al-Andalus Foundation, using an Al-Qaeda affiliated dissemination organization, Al-Ezza.

The foundation has made many video releases, equating themselves to other Al-Qaeda media outlets like As-Sahab and Al-Malahem Media.

On August 2024, Az-Zallaqa made a video announcement about the kidnapping of two Russian nationals in Niger, one of them being a geologist who worked for a Russian company.
