= Family law =

Area of the law that deals with family matters and domestic relations

Family law (also called matrimonial law or the law of domestic relations) is an area of the law that deals with family matters and domestic relations.

== Overview ==
Subjects that commonly fall under a nation's body of family law include:

- Marriage, civil unions, and domestic partnerships:
  - Entry into legally recognized spousal and domestic relationships
  - The termination of legally recognized family relationships and ancillary matters, including divorce, annulment, property settlements, alimony, child custody and visitation, child support and alimony awards
  - Prenuptial and Postnuptial agreements
- Adoption: proceedings to adopt a child and, in some cases, an adult.
- Surrogacy: the law and process of giving birth as a surrogate mother
- Child protective proceedings: court proceedings that may result from state intervention in cases of child abuse and child neglect
- Juvenile law: Matters relating to minors including status offenses, delinquency, emancipation and juvenile adjudication
- Paternity: proceedings to establish and disestablish paternity, and the administration of paternity testing
- Rights: Children's rights, Youth rights, Mothers' rights, Fathers' rights, Parents' rights, Right to family life

This list is not exhaustive and varies depending on jurisdiction.

== Conflict of laws ==
Issues may arise in family law where there is a question as to the laws of the jurisdiction that apply to the marriage relationship or to custody and divorce, and whether a divorce or child custody order is recognized under the laws of another jurisdiction. For child custody, many nations have joined the Hague Convention on the Civil Aspects of International Child Abduction in order to grant recognition to other member states' custody orders and avoid issues of parental kidnapping.

== By jurisdiction ==
- Algerian Family Code
- Federal Circuit and Family Court of Australia
  - Australian family law
- Family Law Act (Canada)
- Burmese customary law
- Matrimonial law in the Catholic Church
- Family law system in England and Wales
  - Children Act of 1989
- Malian Family Code
- Mudawana, the Moroccan Family Code
- The Philippines' Family Code of 1987
- Nashim, the order of the Mishnah outlining Jewish family law

== See also ==
- Alimony
- Child custody
- Child support
- Cohabitation
- Divorce
- Family
- Family court
- Legal separation
- Legitimacy (family law)
- Marriage
- Merger doctrine (family law)
- Shared parenting
- Supervised visitation
