= Battle of Anéfis (2026) =

2026 battle in Anefis

- Part of the Mali War
Date	4–9 July 2026
Location	Anéfis, Mali and surrounding areas
Result	Malian Victory: Anefis recaptured by Malian and Russian forces; Surroundings of the city and the Tabrichat area captured by the FLA forces

Belligerents
Mali; Malian Army; Russia; Africa Corps	Azawad Liberation Front

Casualties and losses
~80 killed (government claim); ~60 injured 1 Mi-24 destroyed	100+ killed (government claim); 12 vehicles destroyed

The 2026 battle of Anefis was a battle that occurred in Anefis, a town in the Kidal Region of Northern Mali. The battle occurred after the initial offensives across Northern Mali that began in April 2026. The battle began on 4 July, with insurgents claiming control of the town, and the town was recaptured on 9 July.

== Background ==
Since 2012, Mali has undergone a civil war, with significant fighting around the north of the country. The town of Anéfis in particular has been the site of many battles, such as in May 2013, June 2013, and 2014. In April 2026, a major escalation occurred in the region, as FLA and JNIM militants launched a large-scale offensive across the country, capturing many cities such as Kidal and Aguelhok.

== Battle ==
On 4 July, the Azawad Liberation Front launched the first attack on the town, as part of a series of coordinated attacks across the country with JNIM. The initial assault was successful and captured most of the town in two hours. The only area of the town that remained under government control was the military, which the rebels began to lay under siege.

On 5 July, FAMa and Africa Corps (Russia) reinforcements were sent from Gao to relieve the soldiers. JNIM militants and FLA rebels were able to intercept the convoy in Tabrichat, 55 km south of Anefis, and managed to shoot down a Mi-24 helicopter.

Another FAMa and Africa Corps convoy was sent on 7 July. The convoy arrived to the town on the morning of 9 July, and managed to capture the town by the evening. On 12 July, revealed the casualties of the attack, claiming that about 30 soldiers died in the fighting and another 60 were injured. They also claimed that a hundred militants were killed in the fighting, and twelve rebel vehicles were destroyed.

FAMa and Africa Corps forces ultimately held the base after days of fighting, but analysts at the Armed Conflict Location and Event Data Project (ACLED) noted that Malian and Russian forces did not control the surrounding terrain or the supply corridor even after the base was secured.

On 17 July, FLA militants attacked a convoy returning from Anefis, killing 50 soldiers and taking 20 prisoners.
