= Abidine =

Abidine may refer to:

== Given name ==
- Abidine Abidine (born 1993), Mauritanian long-distance runner
- Abidine Guindo, Malian colonel
- Abidine Sakande (born 1994), English cricketer

== Surname ==
- Zine El Abidine Ben Ali (1936–2019), the second president of Tunisia
- Zine El-Abidine Sebbah (born 1987), Algerian footballer
