= 2012 Malian counter-coup attempt =

- Part of Mali War
Date	April 30–May 1, 2012
Location	Kati and Bamako, Mali
Result	Green Beret victory: Counter-coup failed

Belligerents
Red Berets; 33rd Parachute Commando Regiment	Green Berets; National Guard; National Gendarmerie

Commanders and leaders
Abidine Guindo; Louis Somboro; Alou Ongoïba; Békaye Bafa Samaké; El Hadj Sékou Diakité	Amadou Haya Sanogo

Casualties and losses
83 prisoners; 26+ executed; 29 released	Unknown
- 14–30+ killed on both sides 40 injured

Between April 30 and May 1, 2012, Malian soldiers of the 33rd Parachute Commando Regiment, colloquially known as the Red Berets, attempted a counter-coup against the Green Berets of the Malian National Guard and Gendarmerie which had overthrown Amadou Toumani Touré and installed Amadou Sanogo in a coup a month prior.

== Background ==
The 33rd Parachute Commando Regiment, also known as the Red Berets, were part of President Amadou Toumani Touré's presidential guard prior to his overthrow on March 21, 2012. Following the coup, the Green Berets of the Malian National Guard and Gendarmerie confiscated four of the Red Berets' BRDM-2's from the latter's camp in Djicoroni, a neighborhood in the Malian capital of Bamako. When other Red Berets returned to Djicoroni after Gao fell to jihadist groups, they were disarmed by the Green Berets, while other regiments who fought alongside them were left alone. This disarmament of the Red Berets was also a humiliation tactic by the Green Berets, as the soldiers were no longer allowed to carry a weapon, including Red Beret guards of the Malian presidential palace. Green Berets would also force Red Berets to remove their berets at certain checkpoints as a form of bullying.

Tensions rose significantly a week before the counter-coup attempt, when coup leader and head of state Amadou Sanogo summoned Touré to his headquarters at Soundiata-Keita military camp in Kati. Touré's aide-de-camp and major of the Red Berets Abidine Guindo declined the invitation, sparking a rumor that Green Berets in Kati were going to launch a punitive raid against Guindo for defying Sanogo. Around this same time, all of the special forces of the Red Berets were summoned at the Djicoroni camp.

== Counter-coup ==
On April 30, Red Beret paratroopers raided the public radio and television building (ORTM), the Modibo Keita International Airport in Bamako, and the Kati military camp. Colonel Alou Ongoiba led the raid at the airport, Captain Békaye Bafa Samaké led the raid on the ORTM, and Captain El Hadj Sékou Diakité led the raid on the Kati camp. The Red Beret forces were commanded by Guindo and his deputy Colonel Louis Somboro.

According to an account by two Red Beret soldiers involved in the battle for the airport, a group of thirteen men with pickups seized the airport, and six Green Berets of the National Committee for the Recovery of Democracy and Restoration of the State (CRNDRE), Sanogo's transitional regime, were killed. One driver of the Red Berets was killed in the battle for the airport as well. The Green Berets, however, counter-attacked with around fifteen pickups and ten BRDM-2s. The Red Berets fled and crossed the nearby river with canoes.

The counter-coup was a failure. Green Berets launched a raid into the Djicoroni camp on May 1, and the Red Berets fled with their families. Some retreated towards the Samako training camp west of Bamako. In total, eleven to fourteen people were killed in the counter-coup attempted and forty were injured.

== Aftermath ==
=== Casualties ===
General Director of the Gabriel Touré hospital Abdoulaye Nènè Coulibaly stated that a total fourteen people were killed and forty others were injured during the counter-coup attempt. Malian military sources reported up to thirty deaths, including six to eleven killed at the ORTM and four at the Djicoroni camp.

=== Arrest and torture ===
Following the coup attempt, at least eighty people, mainly paratroopers, were arrested by the CRNDRE. The detainees were released on June 24 following pressure from the families of the detainees and their lawyers, international human rights groups like Human Rights Watch and Amnesty International, and the Malian Minister of Justice. Forty-three detainees were transferred to Camp 1 of the National Gendarmerie.

Human Rights Watch and Amnesty International, through interviews with Red Beret prisoners, stated that the prisoners were tortured and executed. Survivors claimed that soldiers, police, and National Guard servicemen all tortured the Red Berets at the Kati camp. According to one witness, Sanogo threatened several detainees, and one prisoner who has since disappeared was kicked by a captain. At the Mobile Security Group (GMS) camp, prisoners were subjected to rape, beatings, and burning. The Office of the United Nations High Commissioner for Human Rights stated:

At the Kati camp, 83 soldiers and soldiers, alleged perpetrators of the counter-coup, were crowded into the underground cell commonly called the “Pit”, “The Chute” or “The Hole”, in stifling heat, without light and without contact with the outside, in deplorable hygienic conditions, with two toilets overflowing with excrement and worms. The Mission was informed that some soldiers detained at the Kati camp were allegedly forced by the soldiers in charge of the camp to have sexual relations with each other while their jailers playfully filmed the scene. These same soldiers would have crushed lit cigarettes on different parts of the bodies of their victims. During the first days of their incarceration, all 83 detainees were only allowed a container of water and a portion of rice. Some days they would have been forced to choose between food and water. Others were simply forced to drink their urine or that of other fellow prisoners.

— Office of the High Commissioner for Human Rights,

Twenty Red Berets were disappeared and dozens were tortured by the Green Berets in July 2012. Human Rights Watch accused Sanogo's security forces of these abuses, along with conducting a campaign of intimidation against journalists, relatives of the prisoners, and others involved. Abidine Guindo was arrested on July 11, and confessed his involvement in the counter-coup attempt in October.

All of the detainees were eventually transferred to Camp 1 by September 4. On January 18, 2013, the judge presiding over the case ordered the release of twenty-nine prisoners, including twenty-six Red Berets and three civilians. Malamine Konaré, son of former president Alpha Oumar Konaré, was among the civilians. The twenty-nine prisoners were released on January 29.

=== Mass graves ===
On December 4, 2013, a mass grave containing the bodies of twenty-one missing Red Berets was discovered in Diago, near Kati. The corpses were found blindfolded, with handcuffed hands and chained feet, and were identified in DNA tests in July 2014. Four other bodies were exhumed on December 18 in the Hamdallaye district of Bamako. It contained the bodies of three soldiers and a ginger juice seller, killed during the battle for the ORTM. Five bodies were discovered on February 23, 2014 in two mass graves in Kati. The bodies were in military uniforms, and had their hands tied. Crocodile heads were also found.
