= David Beriáin =

Spanish journalist (1977–2021)

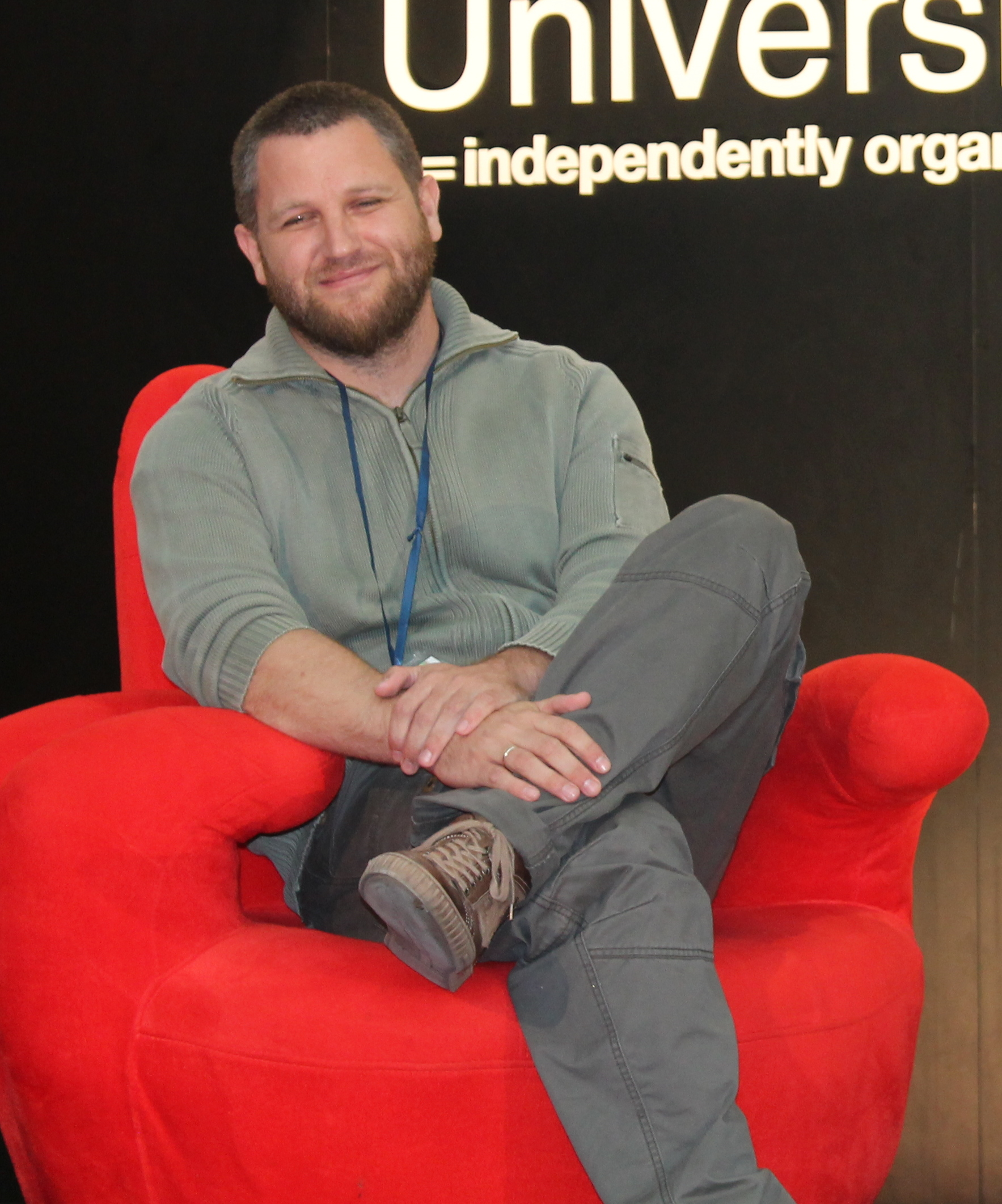
- Beriáin in 2013
- Born: David Beriáin Amatriáin; August 12, 1977; Artajona, Spain
- Died: April 26, 2021 (aged 43); Arli National Park, Pama, Burkina Faso
- Cause of death: Ballistic trauma
- Education: University of Navarra
- Occupation: Journalist
- Employers: Cuatro; DMAX
- Known for: Documenting armed conflicts
- Spouse: Rosaura Romero Trejo
- Parent(s): Angelines Amatrian Jimeno. Francisco Javier Beriáin Arraiza
- Honours: Great Cross of the Order of Civil Merit

David Beriáin Amatriáin (1977 – 26 April 2021) was a Spanish journalist, producer, and documentary anchor, who specialized in armed conflicts, violence, and immersion journalism.

== Biography ==
David Beriáin was born in Pamplona in a red cross clinic. He grew up between Mendigorría (where his parents Francisco Javier Beriáin Arraíza, from Uterga, Angelines Amatrian Jimeno, from Artajona, lived) and Artajona, two towns in Navarre. During an interview, he said of Artajona:

It was my world until I was eighteen. In a way it still is because it is a fundamental reference in my life, it has made me who I am.

After finishing high school he became interested in politics, sociology, history, philosophy, psychology, anthropology and theology. In the end he decided on journalism because "it was the career that left out the least things and, in addition, I liked to write." In 1995 he was admitted to the University of Navarra.

Beriáin graduated from the University of Navarra with a degree in information sciences. During his professional career, he interviewed members of the Taliban, FARC guerrillas, members of drug cartels, and hitmen. He became known for presenting and directing the television show 'Clandestino', which aired on Discovery Max. Beriáin worked for La Voz de Galicia in the international section from March 2001 to July 2007.

In 2002, he was sent to Iraq to serve as a war correspondent, entering the country by being smuggled over the border with Turkey. In March 2002, he traveled to Afghanistan to offer a report on the Taliban. While he was there an earthquake occurred. He was a special envoy for this newspaper in the second war in Iraq and the war in Afghanistan, where he covered the Spanish contingent in the city of Herat and the town of Qala e Naw. As a war correspondent for La Voz de Galicia, he covered conflicts in Iraq, Afghanistan, Sudan, Congo, and Libya.

In March 2008 he was one of the few reporters who managed to enter the FARC camps with a video camera. His series of reports Ten days with the FARC served to show the clandestine world of the Colombian guerrilla organization, which earned him the José Manuel Porquet Prize for Digital Journalism and was a finalist in the Bayeux-Calvados Normandy Prize. the most prestigious in the world for war correspondents.

He started working for Mediaset in 2010 and his first destination was Afghanistan, together with Sergio Caro, the photographer and cameraman with whom he worked the most in his reports. They decided to go on a three-month trip to investigate what the Spanish troops deployed there were facing. During his stay he interviewed the Taliban, future suicide bombers, and accompanied American soldiers who operated in the same areas as the Spanish into combat. The result of that work was the documentary Afghanistán: españoles en la ratonera (English: Afghanistan: Spaniards in the Mousetrap), broadcast on CNN +.7 Since the beginning of that same year he was part of the REC Reporteros Cuatro team.

In April 2010, he recorded a report in Colombia, about minors who narrated their experience as hired hitmen in the country. In June of that same year, Beriain reported on the development of Chavismo, interviewing on the streets of Venezuela. In September he returned to Baghdad, where the American troops were no longer there; and in October he traveled to the jungles of the Congo, entering the mineral markets and the "frontless war fronts." With the information obtained there he made the documentary Congo, tierra violada (In English: Congo: Violated Land)

In 2011 he worked as director for the short documentary Sea Bites Barnacles, which narrates the risky industry of barnacles, a production that was a candidate for the Goya Awards in 2012.

He also worked in other media, such as the Argentine newspaper El Liberal. On television, he was part of the team of reporters for the REC program broadcast by Cuatro. On Antena 3, he carried out a report on the Fukushima Daiichi nuclear disaster.

In 2012, he founded the audiovisual production company 93 Metros, which specializes in large audiovisual formats, data journalism, and design of advertising content and other innovative technologies.

In 2013 he made a documentary in Kenya about the work of the ANIDAN and Pablo Horstmann foundations in Lamu (Kenya), about the development of prostitution and AIDS in children and adults.

In 2014 he traveled with Discovery MAX to the Amazon, where he made a documentary about the killing of wildlife in the Amazon, in an area close to the Yasuní territory, where there is an immense wealth of biodiversity.

== Death ==
Beriain was murdered in Arli National Park on April 27, 2021, along with cameraman Roberto Fraile and conservationist Rory Young, by Jama'at Nasr al-Islam wal Muslimin (JNIM) militants. They were filming a documentary about poaching in Burkina Faso, when they entered territory belonging to Al Qaeda. Shortly after, militants blocked their path and opened fire on the convoy in which they were traveling. According to one of the Burkinabe soldiers who were with them, during the shootout Beriain, Fraile and Young hid in the forest. It was later reported that Fraile had been seriously wounded during the shootout, so Beriain and Young stayed with him instead of trying to escape.

The next day, then Minister of Foreign Affairs of Spain, Arancha González Laya, during the Council of Ministers, reported that the bodies of Beriain, Fraile and Young had been found in the area of the attack. Young was the president and founder of the NGO Chengeta Wildlife, which is dedicated to the fight against poaching in Africa. Later in an audio, the JNIM, linked to Al Qaeda, claimed responsibility for the attack.

His body, as well as those of Fraile and Young, arrived on April 30 at the Torrejón de Ardoz Airport, Madrid, from where it was then transferred to Artajona. He was buried the next morning. A funeral was held later that day at Reina Urraca High School, where Beriain had studied.

== Awards ==
- José Manuel Porquet Digital Journalism Award for "Diez días con las FARC"
- Nominated in Normandy's Bayeux
- RealScreen Awards, topicality documentaries award for 'El negocio del secuestro en Venezuela' in 2019
- RealScreen Awards for 'La Colombia de las FARC' in 2016
