= Roberto Fraile =

Spanish journalist and cameraman (1974–2021)

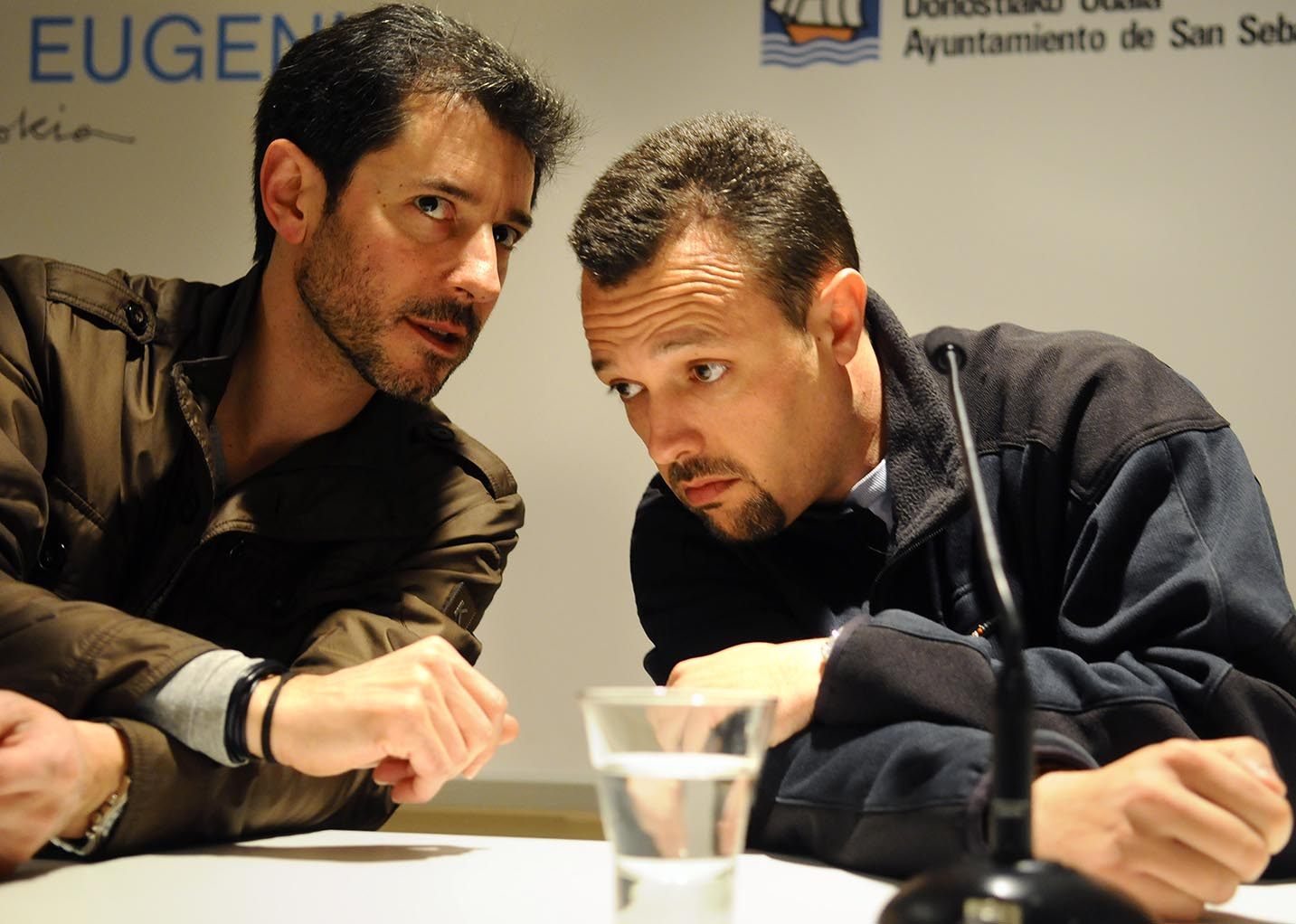
Fraile (right) in a conference in 2012.

Roberto Fraile Fernández (1974 – 26 April 2021) was a Spanish journalist and cameraman.

== Biography ==
Born in Barakaldo, he lived and worked in various media in Salamanca. He was a cameraman for Salamanca television since the 1990s and for some years he was also at La 8 de Salamanca. During a good part of his career he was linked to Radio Televisión Castilla y León.

He combined this work with filming armed conflicts. In 2012 he was injured by an explosion in Aleppo, where he was filming insurgent troops in the context of the Syrian civil war and was operated on in a hospital and evacuated to Turkey. During the last years of his life he made documentaries in Colombia and Brazil.

== Murder ==
On 26 April 2021, Fraile was killed at the age of 46, alongside fellow Spanish journalist David Beriáin and Irish conservationist Rory Young, while they were filming a documentary about poaching in Pama, Burkina Faso. Their convoy was ambushed by Nusrat al-Islam, which then opened fire against them. He had two sons.
