= Rory Young =

Irish-Zambian conservationist (1972–2021)

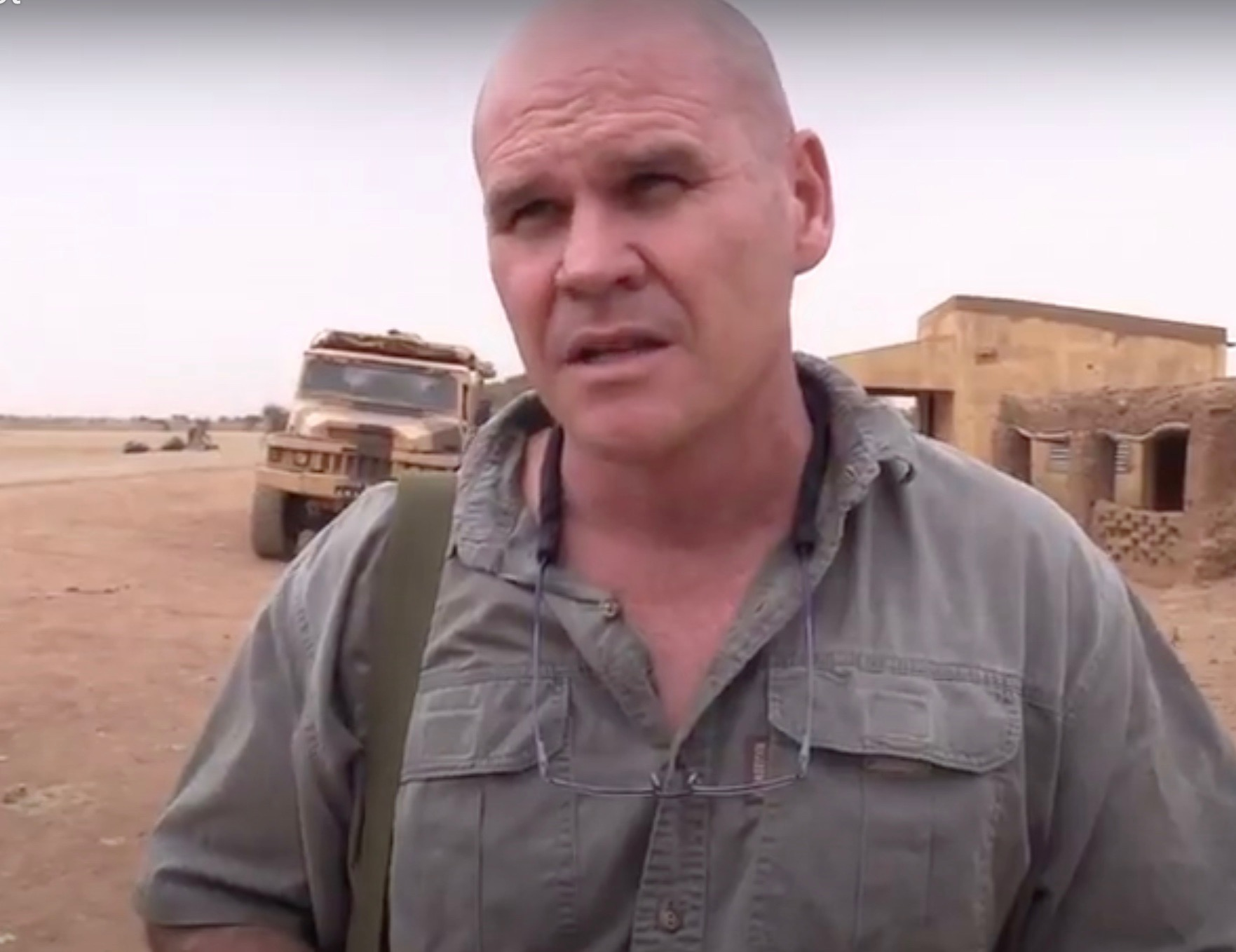
- Rory Young working in Mali to protect Desert Elephants, 2017
- Born: May 21, 1972; Zambia
- Died: April 26, 2021 (aged 48); Burkina Faso
- Occupations: Conservationist; anti-poaching strategist

Rory Young (21 May 1972 – 26 April 2021) was a Zambian-born Irish wildlife conservationist and anti-poaching strategist. His company, Chengeta Wildlife, operates across Africa.

Young was killed by jihadists in Burkina Faso, West Africa, along with the Spanish journalist David Beriáin and the documentary filmmaker Roberto Fraile while working on a documentary about his work in Africa.

== Personal life ==
Young was married to Marjet Wessels. They have two children together, a son and a daughter. The Youngs resided in the Netherlands.

Young was active on the question-and-answer site Quora. He was a Top Writer on the site, and his contributions galvanized people all over the world to protect wildlife.

== Death ==
On 26 April 2021, Young was killed along with Spanish journalists and documentary filmmakers David Beriáin and Roberto Fraile, after their convoy was attacked by Jama'at Nasr al-Islam wal Muslimin militants in Burkina Faso, while working on a documentary about wildlife poaching. After initially successfully repelling the attack, the convoy was overrun and the three Europeans tried to escape in their vehicle. At first they managed to hide, but after a few hours they were found and murdered by the terrorists.
