= Law enforcement in Mali =

Law enforcement in Mali is the responsibility of the National Police Force (French: Police Nationale du Mali), which is subordinate to the Ministry of Internal Security and Civil Protection. The National Police Force shares responsibility for internal security with the Gendarmerie, a paramilitary organization; the police are responsible exclusively for urban areas, while the Gendarmerie's primary responsibility is for rural areas, though it may also reinforce the police when needed. According to The Wall Street Journal, each organization has approximately 5,000 personnel, while Interpol gives a figure of over 7,000 for the police.

In October 2015, Moussa Ag Infahi replaced Hamidou Kansaye as Director General of the National Police, while Colonel-Major Satigui Dit Moro Sidibé became the new Director General of the Gendarmerie, succeeding Colonel-Major Mody Bérété. Local police districts are headed by commissioners, who report to regional directors at national police headquarters.

The police are poorly trained, equipped and led, and suffer from low morale. Corruption is also a problem. Following the 2013 national elections, Mali's new government made improving the police a priority and accepted the assistance of various countries and external organizations, including Japan; the United Nations Development Programme; the United Nations Office on Drugs and Crime and the Department of Peacekeeping Operations, through the Multidimensional Integrated Stabilization Mission in Mali (MINUSMA); and a European Union Training Mission.

Mali has been a member of Interpol since 1969.

Being a former French colony, Mali has a civil law system based on the French model.

== See also ==
- Malian Family Code
