= Gouagnon Coulibaly =

Malian politician

President of the Union for the Republic and Democracy
- Incumbent
- Assumed office April 2023

Representative of Kati in the National Assembly of Mali
- Incumbent
- Assumed office ?

Personal details
- Born: 15 August 1962 (age 63) Kolokani, Mali

Gouagnon Coulibaly (born 15 August 1962) is a member of the National Assembly of Mali, representing Kati, and a member of the Union for the Republic and Democracy (URD) political party. In 2022, he was elected president of the URD but was accused of electoral fraud, leading to several months of conflict with opponent Salikou Sanogo. Coulibaly officially took office in April 2023 after the Supreme Court affirmed his presidency.

He was the campaign manager for Soumaïla Cissé in the 2013 Malian presidential election. He accused Ibrahim Boubacar Keita of ballot stuffing during the campaign.

During the 2020 Malian protests, he has claimed to represent the M5-RFP coalition. When ECOWAS recommended the resignation of 31 Parliamentarians whose election in the 2020 Malian parliamentary election were disputed, he rejected the proposal, claiming it violated the Constitution of Mali.
