= 2017 Timbuktu attack =

Battle of the Mali War

- Part of Mali War
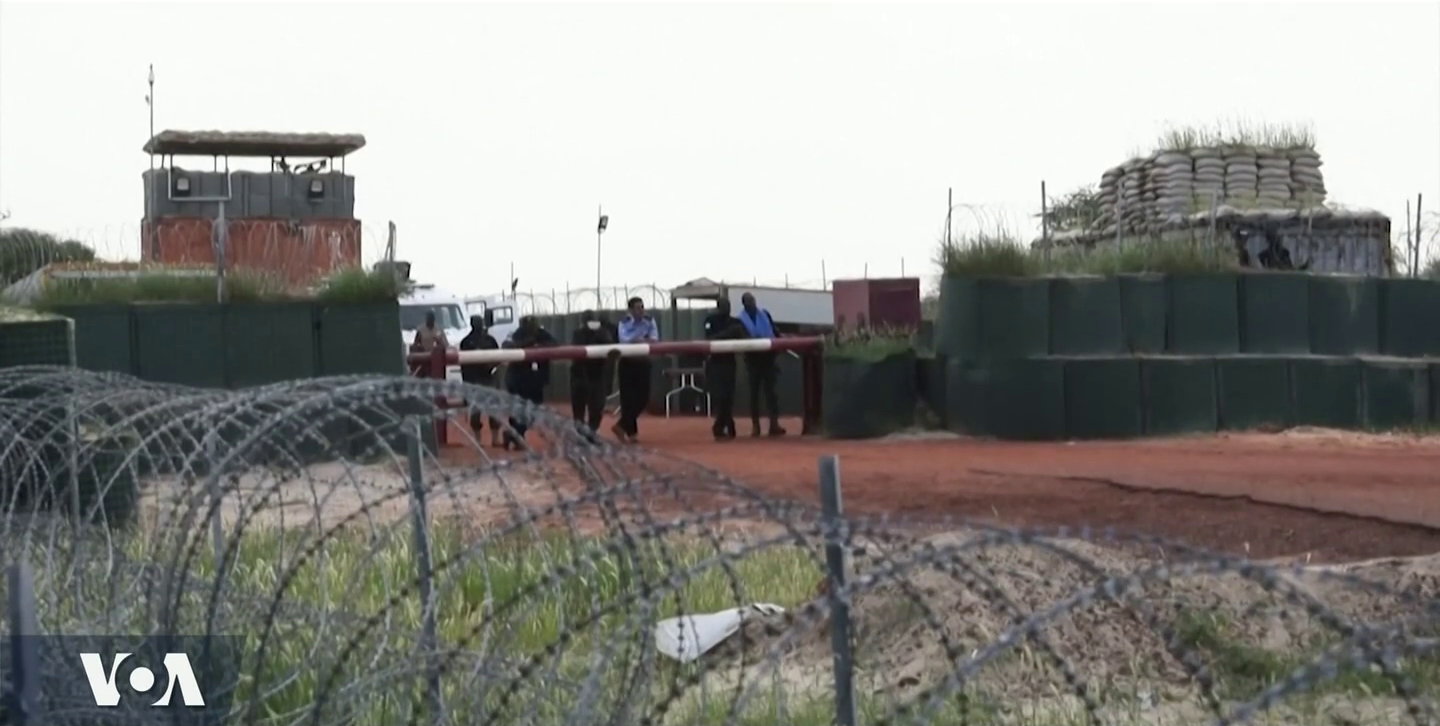
Date	August 14, 2017
Location	MINUSMA base, Timbuktu, Mali
Result	Indecisive

Belligerents
Mali; MINUSMA: Burkina Faso; Ghana; Bangladesh; El Salvador; Liberia; Nigeria; Sweden; Cambodia; Egypt; Ivory Coast	Jama'at Nasr al-Islam wal Muslimin

Commanders and leaders
Unknown	Abu Abdul Rahman al-Sanhaji

Casualties and losses
6 killed, 1 injured 6 injured	6 killed
- 1 civilian killed

On August 14, 2017, jihadists from Jama'at Nasr al-Islam wal Muslimin attacked a MINUSMA base in Timbuktu, Mali.

== Prelude ==
Jama'at Nasr al-Islam wal Muslimin formed in 2017 as the coalition of five jihadist groups that rebelled against the Malian government in 2012. The group's first actions were ambushes and raids against Malian and French forces in the region.

At the time of the attack, the MINUSMA base in Timbuktu was defended by three Burkinabe infantry companies, a Ghanaian engineering company, a Bangladeshi communications company, a Liberian infantry company, a Salvadoran helicopter company, a medical company and a company of Nigerian police, a Swedish reconnaissance and infantry company, a Cambodian mine clearance platoon, an Egyptian military police platoon and an Ivorian police company.

The same day of the attack on Timbuktu, a similar one was carried out by JNIM at the MINUSMA base in Douentza, where a Malian soldier and a Togolese peacekeeper were killed, along with two attackers.

== Attack ==
At 2pm local time on August 14, a small group of jihadists attacked the MINUSMA base in Timbuktu. The jihadists shot at the Malian security guards on patrol with grenades and AK-47 fire. At least two attackers were able to enter the camp, but they were quickly shot down by the peacekeepers. Around this time, French and Malian forces began to intervene against the jihadists.

Thierry Oberle, a journalist at Le Figaro, stated that "The Blue Helmets came close to disaster on August 14. This summer Monday, some of the UN personnel were on leave when a commando sprayed the entry point with a rocket launcher from the headquarters of the International Force, killing five sentries. Obviously well informed, he neutralizes the server at the telecommunications centre, heads towards the restaurant and storms the office of the head of the mission along the way. The six terrorists are shot dead before they can commit a massacre. The bloody episode reaches its epilogue during the night in the morgue, where two armed men seek to recover the corpses of their companions. Entrenched in their premises, the Malian gendarmes do not flinch. As for MINUSMA, it hesitates, then changes its mind and chases away the attackers."

Abu Abdul Rahman al-Sanhaji, a co-founder of JNIM within AQIM, was present at the attack. al-Sanhaji gave a speech before the attack saying that Tuaregs, Arabs, and Fulani came together to conduct the attack. While the attack occurred before the announcement of the formation of JNIM, al-Sanhaji echoed sentiments of tribal unity that would be reiterated in the video announcing JNIM.

== Aftermath ==
MINUSMA reported that thirteen people were killed in the attack; five guards from a Malian security company, a Malian gendarme, a civilian contract agent from MINUSMA and six jihadists. A Malian security guard and six peacekeepers were injured, two of them seriously. The two seriously injured peacekeepers were Burkinabe.

No group claimed responsibility for the attack, but Jama'at Nasr al-Islam wal Muslimin was suspected. The United Nations Security Council condemned the attack. Mahamat Saleh Annadif, head of MINUSMA, called the attack "cowardly and despicable", while António Guterres, United Nations Secretary General, stated that the attack may constitute war crimes.
