= Labbezanga =

- Village
- Location in Mali
- Coordinates: 14°58′10″N 0°42′16″E
- Country: Mali
- Region: Gao Region
- Cercle: Ansongo Cercle
- Time zone: UTC+1 (WAT)

Labbezanga (also spelled Labbézanga) is a village in the Gao region of Mali located on the Niger River, bordering Niger.

== Military history ==
The Malian Armed Forces operate a border post at Labbezanga.

Between June and August 2020, the French Armed Forces of Operation Barkhane erected a bastion fort in Labbezanga in a Vauban style. When it was first built, Le Figaro called the fortress "impregnable." The camp was shifted to the Malian Armed Forces on July 23, 2020.

=== 2023 attack ===
Labbezanga is deep in territory controlled by the jihadist groups Jama'at Nasr al-Islam wal Muslimin (JNIM) and the Islamic State – Sahel Province (ISSP). The Malian military camp has been the target of many jihadist attacks, including one in July 2023 that injured a civilian. In early 2023, the Malian junta that took power in 2021 demanded the evacuation of MINUSMA by the end of the year. Around this same time, the Malian Army began cooperating with the Russian Wagner Group after the junta kicked the French of Operation Barkhane out a year prior.

Two attacks were launched by ISGS on December 3; one in Ménaka and one in Labbezanga. The attack in Menaka targeted the pro-government Movement for the Salvation of Azawad (MSA) and GATIA militias, and briefly ended after an hour of fighting. ISSP attacked the Malian fort at Labbezanga while fighting at Menaka raged, with the Menaka attack intended to divert Malian attention and forces away from Labbezanga. ISSP fighters seized weapons, ammunition, and fuel, and torched the camp before abandoning it.

Malian officials stated in a report that night that several dozen jihadists were killed and twenty were captured across both attacks, but these reports were unverifiable. In later reports, the Malian army stated it had conducted air and land counteroffensives against the group. RFI stated that between thirty and forty Malian soldiers were killed in the attack. The Malian junta denied the capture of the camp, but photos released by the Islamic State's Amaq News Agency showed the fighters capturing the base. The raid was likely the first confrontation between Wagner mercenaries and ISSP fighters since the mercenaries arrived in Mali earlier that year.

After the attack subsided, Nigerien soldiers from across the border visited the base to aid Malian soldiers.

=== Aftermath ===
On December 23, 2023, Malian colonel Ibrahim Samassa visited the camp at Labbezanga, which was repopulated by Malian soldiers led by Souleymane Dembele. Samassa congratulated the soldiers in defending the base after the attack on December 3. Malian counteroffensive operations were called Operation Moniko, and lasted from December 3 to January 25, 2024. Malian officials claimed that Operation Moniko killed sixty-five jihadists and arrested forty-two others.

=== 2026 Mali offensives ===
During the 2026 Mali offensives, IS-SP captured the village and military base following the withdrawal of African Corps from the area on April 27, 2026. The Malian Armed Forces would recapture the area on May 5th.

== In popular culture ==
Labbezanga is mentioned in the movie Sahara, based on the book by Clive Cussler. The two adventurers, Dirk Pitt and Al Giordino, stop at Labbezanga when they first enter Mali. It is described as one of the greatest ports in West Africa in the 19th century. The port is also a place of trade. Most of the villagers are fishermen, and the rest herd animals, such as goats.
