= Abidine Guindo =

Malian colonel

- Born: Mopti Region, Mali
- Children: 2
- Military career
- Allegiance: 1975-present
- Branch: Malian Army
- Rank: Colonel
- Unit: 33rd Parachute Commando Regiment
- Known for: Leading the 2012 Malian counter-coup attempt
- Conflicts: Mali War: 2012 Malian coup d'etat; 2012 Malian counter-coup attempt

Abidine Guindo is a Malian colonel and the former commander of the 33rd Parachute Commando Regiment. He participated in and led the failed counter-coup attempt against Amadou Haya Sanogo in April 2012.

== Biography ==
Guindo was born in Mopti Region, and joined the 33rd Parachute Commando Regiment in 1975. As a 2nd class soldier in the Malian Army, he met Amadou Toumani Touré (ATT) in the late 1970s. In 1979, he was appointed as the jump instructor. Guindo later became one of ATT's most trusted companions, and was one of the eleven paratroopers responsible for the arrest of Moussa Traoré during the 1991 Malian coup d'état. The coup restored multi-party democracy in Mali, and Guindo subsequently became ATT's military second-in-command during the 1990s.

Guindo became commander of the 33rd Regiment following ATT's victory in the 2002 Malian presidential election. At the start of the Mali War in 2012, Guindo and the 33rd fought Tuareg rebels in northern Mali, but quickly retreated south. Guindo was also present at the 2012 Malian coup d'état that overthrew ATT and installed Amadou Haya Sanogo. There are differing accounts to Guindo's role in the 2012 coup; some state he was responsible for ATT's extraction while another source states Guindo advised ATT to surrender to the mutineers.

In late April 2012, Guindo was summoned to the Soundiata-Keita military camp in Kati by Sanogo. Guindo, fearing for his safety, put the 33rd Regiment on alert. Guindo launched a counter-coup attempt on April 30, but it had failed by the following day. He then fled into hiding, but was arrested by Sanogo's Malian Army on July 11, 2012. Guindo was released on November 9, 2013, as part of reconciliation measures between the 33rd regiment and Sanogo's troops. On February 20, 2018, Guindo was charged with "undermining the internal security of the state and illegal use of weapons" in regards to the counter-coup attempt.

Guindo's son Aidine Guindo, a lieutenant in the Malian Army, died in November 2017 during a jihadist attack in Niafunké. Guindo's adopted son Boubacar Mamadou Guindo, a sergeant, committed suicide on March 13, 2019.
