= Sadio Camara =

Malian military officer (1979–2026)

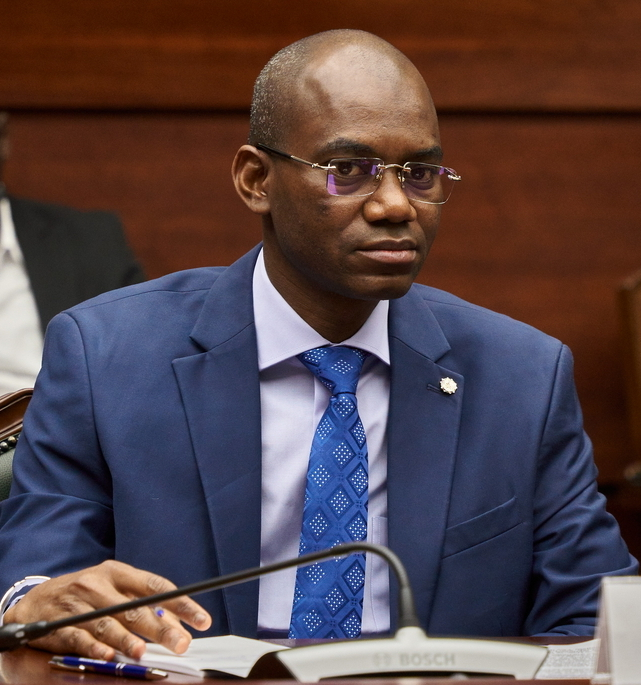
- Camara in 2022

Minister of Defense and Veterans Affairs
- In office 11 June 2021 – 25 April 2026
- President: Assimi Goïta
- Prime Minister: Choguel Kokalla Maïga (interim); Abdoulaye Maïga (interim)
- Preceded by: Souleymane Doucouré
- Succeeded by: Assimi Goïta
- In office 5 October 2020 – 24 May 2021
- President: Bah Ndaw
- Prime Minister: Moctar Ouane (interim)
- Preceded by: Tiéna Coulibaly
- Succeeded by: Souleymane Doucouré

Personal details
- Born: 22 March 1979 Kati, Koulikoro Region, Mali
- Died: 25 April 2026 (aged 47) Kati, Koulikoro Region, Mali
- Cause of death: Assassination
- Citizenship: Mali; France
- Education: Joint Military School

Military service
- Allegiance: Mali
- Branch: Malian Armed Forces; National Guard
- Rank: Army corps general
- Conflict: Mali War; 2026 Mali attacks X

Sadio Camara (22 March 1979 – 25 April 2026) was a Malian military officer who served as the minister of defence of Mali from 2021 until his assassination in 2026. He took an active part in the 2020 Malian coup d'état along with Colonel Assimi Goïta that ousted the government of Ibrahim Boubacar Keïta, and began serving as the country's minister of defence at that time.

Camara served as minister of defence between October 2020 and May 2021 when he was replaced. This prompted a new coup and he was reinstated on 11 June 2021.

== Early life ==
Sadio Camara was born on 22 March 1979 in Kati, Koulikoro Region, Mali. He was a graduate of the Joint Military School, and began his career in the Malian National Guard.

== Career ==
At the time of the 2020 coup, Camara was serving as head of the Kati Military School, and was receiving military training in Russia since 2019. Camara was on leave from his training in Russia when he took part in the August 2020 coup and was named Minister of Defense in October 2020 under the interim government of Prime Minister Moctar Ouane. He served in that position until late May 2021 when he was excluded from the newly formed government by Bah Ndaw, the interim leader after the 2020 coup.

Camara's ousting allegedly prompted Colonel Assimi Goïta to launch a "coup within a coup" in May 2021 when Goïta took over power and ordered the arrest of Ndaw and his cabinet during the 2021 Malian coup d'état. This prompted the United Nations and many governments to condemn the coup and ask for the release of the detained leaders.

On 11 June 2021, Col. Goïta—who later became a général d'armée—appointed Camara again as Minister of Defense and Veterans Affairs, and he was eventually promoted to the rank of général de corps d'armée. Camara was a key architect of the "pro-sovereigntist" policy of the military junta, which sought to replace France with Russia as Mali's international partner, and helped arrange the deployment of Russia's Wagner Group to Mali. He regularly announced the transfers of military equipment to Mali from Russia, and visited his Russian counterpart, Andrey Belousov, in June 2025. The United States imposed sanctions on Camara in July 2023 for his links to the Wagner Group. His designation revealed that he also held French citizenship. The sanctions were lifted in February 2026.

== Assassination ==
Camara was killed on 25 April 2026 in the wake of the nationwide militant attacks led by the Azawad Liberation Front and the JNIM. A vehicle-borne explosive detonated outside his residence in Kati, a heavily fortified garrison town about 15 kilometres (9.3 mi) northwest of Bamako, the capital, where President Assimi Goïta and other junta leaders also reside. The government confirmed his death the next day and announced that Mali would observe two days of mourning in his honor. He was given a state funeral on 30 April. On 4 May, president Goïta appointed himself defence minister.
