= Uterga =

Town and municipality in Navarre, Spain

Coordinates: 42°42′N 1°45′W

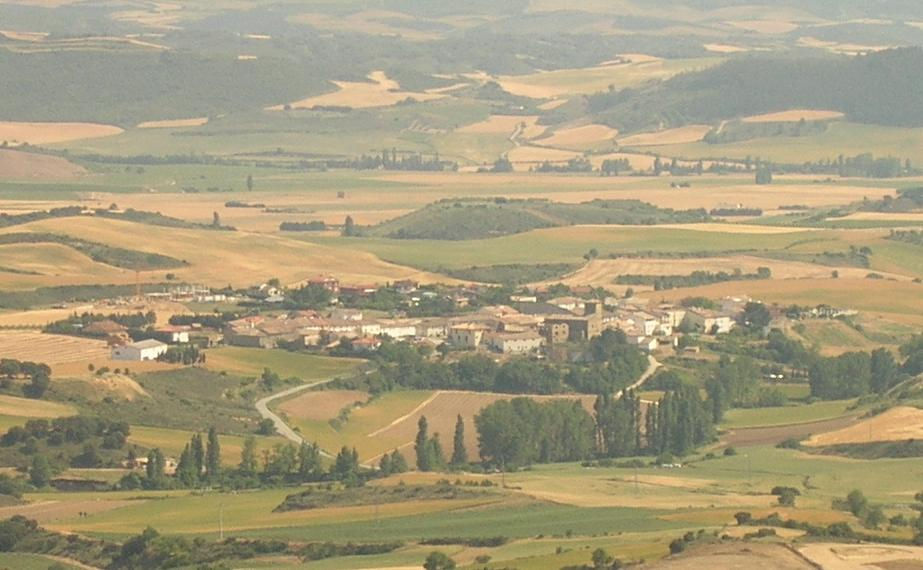
View of Uterga from El Perdón

Uterga is a town and municipality located in the province and the autonomous community of Navarre, northern Spain.
