= Malian Family Code =

Legal framework in Mali

The Family Code is a significant legal framework that governs family and personal matters in the West African nation of Mali.

== History of the Family Code ==
The Malian family code resulted after many years of discussion within the Malian government, with the first codification of family law occurring in 1962, just two years after women were granted equal rights under Malian law in 1960. The Malian family code has implications for the societal treatment and expected behaviors of both sexes. The Family Code was structured in a way that allowed the government to legislate marriage relations and define the treatment of women in society.

Since the initial implementation, efforts have been undertaken to change and modify the family code, with the first reform effort being initiated in 1999. The initial reform worked to expand the rights granted to women under the protection of the law, but conservative pushback resulted in the failure of that law to pass and the necessity for revisions. The reform efforts ultimately boiled down to a debate over preserving traditional Islamic values or expanding rights for women in a way that was perceived as being more Westernized. Following the restructuring of the Family Code, women's rights were not expanded, but rather almost wholly eliminated, perpetuating the notion that women are subject to the whims of their husbands.

When Mali's government implemented multiparty elections, there has been a greater push for reforms in the existing Family Code to expand the protections of women under Malian law. Much of the debate surrounding changing the Family Code is a result of apparent conflicts between proposed amendments and traditional Islamic practices.

The Malian governmental system defines itself as being secular, meaning the government should not intervene in religious institutions or practices. However, religious and cultural practices have great influences on the construction and enforcement of Malian law. Notably, the Family Code relies on the application of religious practices and customary law in issues of family interactions, inheritance, and marriage. A large proportion of the Malian population is of Muslim faith, generating more widespread support for upholding Islamic practices. Many of these influences are grounded in Islamic principles, thereby creating an Islamic influence on the law. This is largely due to the fact that a number of Mali's laws are based largely on a combination of French and Islamic law with very diverse local laws. Specifically, many of the Islamic practices detailing marriage and family customs have been integrated into Mali's laws concerning the same issues, especially in areas of the state with traditionally Muslim leadership.

== Reform of the Family Code ==
Since the adoption of the original Family Code, there has been a push for reforming the family code in an effort to provide women and children with more equal protection under the law. The argumentation over certain amendments within the code and the push for reform has been an ongoing debate that shows no signs of slowing down. Within the proposed reform to the law, women are no longer bound by law to obey their husbands, but only a minority of women who have been educated demonstrated strong support for the law. The largest driving force supporting the expanded female empowerment are the women who already have a greater capacity to interact with Mali's structural institutions given their greater degree of political knowledge. Another tension challenging the law is the argument that it violates important family and marital principles of Islam, generating a large degree of pushback from the religious communities. There was also opposition on the groups that the new law only supported European ideals and not actual Malian ideology.

The closest reform got to a successful expansion of women's rights was in the 2009 reform period. The initial discussion of this new legislation granted more rights to women and expanded freedoms. The National Assembly actually ended up adopting this version of the law. Yet, widespread protests and backlash led to the bill being sent back and altered before officially passing. The version that ended up passing involved a lowering of the minimum marriage age and the reinstatement of the original obedience clause, stating that women have to obey the demands of their husbands.

One of the largest hindrances to successful reform is the understanding that changes to legislation will not be implemented effectively when there is a gap in enforcement and social practice. This has led to a lot of skepticism and distrust amongst individuals who feel that even with reform, the oppressive society will remain due to historical precedent and social norms. A key example of this dissonance is the fact that the Malian constitution explicitly states that men and women are equal, a principle that has persisted throughout governments; yet, the law does not reflect this equal standing.

The most controversial areas of reform have been bride price, registration of marriage, number of wives, the obligation to obedience, choice of the site of residence, and inheritance. In all of these cases, the fundamental disagreement comes down to whether the Family Code should preserve Islamic Principles and maintain the status quo legislation or should the legislation be altered to give women more power and freedom in their actions.

== Proposed amendment ==
The proposed amendment would have recognised only civil marriages, while defining marriage as a secular institution, thus entitling a divorcee to a share of inheritance. Women would have also been allowed greater inheritance rights than what was stipulated by Shariah law, as they would not be required to obey their husbands. The "paternal power" would be replaced with "parental authority," and also said "no marriage can be renounced." Furthermore, the bill raised the legal age for marriage to 18 and allowed divorce if a couple had lived apart for at least three years. A child born outside of marriage would also be entitled to a share of any inheritance.

President Toumani Touré supported the bill, which was seen as a move toward secularism. The law was initially adopted by the National Assembly on August 3, 2009.

=== Advocacy ===
During the NGO Forum of the African Commission on Human and Peoples' Rights in Banjul, an African women's rights groups called for the adoption of the bill, saying it "provides some crucial guarantees for Malian women's universal rights, [and] would constitute a fundamental first step towards bringing Malian laws into compliance with international and regional standards." The group cited Mali's ratification of the United Nations Convention on the Elimination of All Forms of Discrimination against Women in 1985, the Protocol to the African Charter on Human and Peoples' Rights on the Rights of Women in Africa in 2005, and the UN Convention on the Rights of the Child in 1990. It further said: "We are thus deeply concerned that the enactment of this legislation...is in suspense. Violations of Malian women's human rights are favored by this legislative gap. We stress the urgent need to adopt such a code...by ensuring that the second reading takes place without further delay and that the Family Code is enacted in its present form, without weakening of any of its provisions."

=== Controversy ===
Mamadou Diamouténé, the head of a task group from the council, said that without the recommended changes, the bill would be "open road to debauchery. It is not that anyone can go wherever she wishes without her husband's approval, because we cannot forget that the man is the head of the family."

Muslim leaders and other youth groups vowed to block the law and even threatened a campaign of violence. Threats against legislators, angry sermons, organised protest meetings and radio and television campaigns all attempted to rally opposition to the bill. Some Muslim leaders went so far as to call the law the work of the devil and against Islam. Tens of thousands marched in the streets to protest the law. In one such demonstration, 50,000 people rallied amidst calls that the bill was "an insult to the Koran."

Some women's groups were also opposed to the law. The president of the National Union of Muslim Women said that "only a tiny minority of woman here who want this new law. The poor and illiterate women of this country, the real Muslims, are against it".

One imam who spoke in support of the code went into hiding.

=== Reactions ===
President Touré reasserted that the struggle to pursue "the dual objective of promoting a wave of modernization while preserving the foundations of our society" would continue. He also said that failures to update and enforce the law "proves that societal change is not ordered by decree. [The] door of debate is still open."

Mountaga Tall, an MP, said: "We demonstrated intellectual laziness in adopting the last code so quickly. This time, the assembly will start from zero."

==== Further amendments ====
As a result of public outcry, President Touré sent the bill back to parliament on August 27, 2009. "I have taken this decision to send the family code for a second reading to ensure calm and a peaceful society, and to obtain the support and understanding of our fellow citizens."

An amended version, endorsed by the High Islamic Council, the highest authority on Islam in the country, was tabled. This new bill included the reintroduction of religious marriage, altered the previous version's enhancement of women's inheritance rights, and changed the recognition of an illegitimate child. Other amendments being proposed, despite being blocked in the initial version, include:

- A husband and wife can keep separate homes only if the husband approves;
- A divorcée may keep her ex-husband's name if he agrees;
- A girl would be allowed to get married at 15.

However these three proposals have not been made a part of law, whereas religious marriage is still going to be maintained

The debate over the bill included "civil society" groups in the first phase, and religious groups in the amendment phase.

== Women and the Family Code ==
Women are largely impacted by the existence of the Family Code. These impacts are structural, economic, political, and social. The Family Code outlines the ways that women are able to interact with society. The Family Code also has major implications on the ability for women to own or inherit property. As it exists right now, women are granted access to land, but not the rights to own or control it.

The African Court on Human and People's Rights determined that Mali's Family Code (as of 2018) violated not only women's rights but also the human rights of children. This determination was made after examining the fact that Mali's human rights laws actually had exceptions in place that allowed for the violation of human rights in times of emergency. Another determined violation included the age of marriage for girls, which in Mali was 16 while it was 18 according to the African Children's Charter. This case was incredibly notable because it is the first time that this court has actually determined a country to be in violation of the various human rights charters in place.

Many of the revision efforts place emphasis on expanding the rights of women and upholding the principle of female equality established in the Malian Constitution. The Government of Mali has favored laws that uphold the constitutionally established principles of equality. However, those principles do not directly translate to the amendments that exist within the Family Code.

Women have been largely driving forces to revisions in the Family Code, specifically as it relates to expanding their societal capacities and protections. These efforts have been undertaken by many different women's rights activists and educated individuals.

A correlation has been noted that women in Mali are more likely to be able to engage with the institutions beyond their home village if they have received higher education and have a broader understanding of the political systems. These same women are the ones who support revisions to the Family Code that would challenge some of the original provisions and replace them with ones that grant more female rights and empowerment.

Aside from education being a driving factor in female support for a revised family code, socioeconomic status uniquely impacts support. Women who are more empowered economically are more statistically likely to support the versions of the code that expand female protections under the law. All of the driving factors for female support are tied to their ability to access political knowledge and engage within the governmental and societal structures that already exist. The wage gap that exists in Mali is due to structural factors and the inequality in both the occupational hierarchy and structure of wages. When looking at typical gender norms in countries of similar economic development to Mali, Mali is unique in the sense that it has much wider gender differences in education and type of employment.

Even with education and higher socioeconomic status, the ability for a woman to participate in government is still largely governed by the decisions of men. This is due to the cultural expectation, and Family Code legislation requiring female obedience to her husband. Women's freedom to participate in government was largely expanded with the introduction of gender quotas in 2016. Until then, women did not hold seats in government. Even with the establishment of quotas, not all women are able to participate in government because they lack the means and ability to do so.
