= Kati, Mali =

Kati
- Commune and town
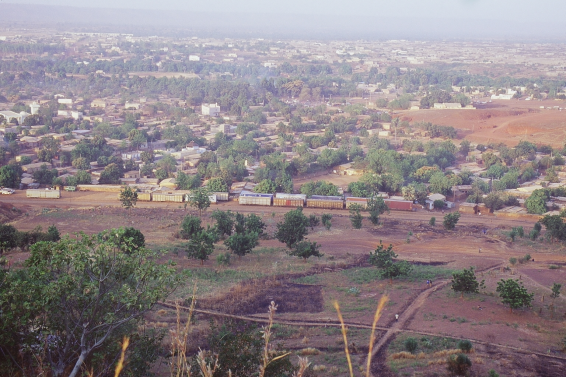
- Kati seen from surrounding hills

- Location within Mali
- Coordinates: 12°44′48″N 8°4′17″W
- Country: Mali
- Region: Koulikoro
- Cercle: Kati Cercle
- Urban Commune: Kati
- Elevation: 481 m (1,578 ft)

Population (2009 census)
  - Total: 114,983
- Time zone: UTC+0 (GMT)

Kati is an urban commune and the largest town in Mali's Koulikoro Region. The town is situated 15 km northwest of Bamako, Mali's capital, on the Dakar-Niger Railway. In the 2009 census, the commune had a population of 114,983.

== History ==
In the early 17th century, Kati was part of a kingdom ruled by the Diara family, based in Nyamina. Shortly after the kafo of Bamako was founded, the Niare clan attacked Kati and forced the town to pay yearly tribute in cattle and cowries. Kati launched a failed rebellion against Bamako's dominance shortly before the arrival of the French in 1880, and was at that time nearly uninhabited.

Kati was the site of Camp Gallieni, where the 2nd Regiment of Senegalese Tirailleurs was garrisoned. On 13 May 1934 a war memorial was dedicated to dead from the First World War and the conquest of Sudan. After Mali became independent, the French Armed Forces left Kati on 8 June 1961. The Malian Army founded a military school at the base.

=== 2026 attacks ===
On April 25, 2026, fighters affiliated with Jama'at Nusrat al-Islam wal-Muslimin (JNIM) and Azawad Liberation Front (FLA) launched a series of attacks across the country, including on the residence of Sadio Camara, the defense minister of Mali, killing him.

== Economy ==
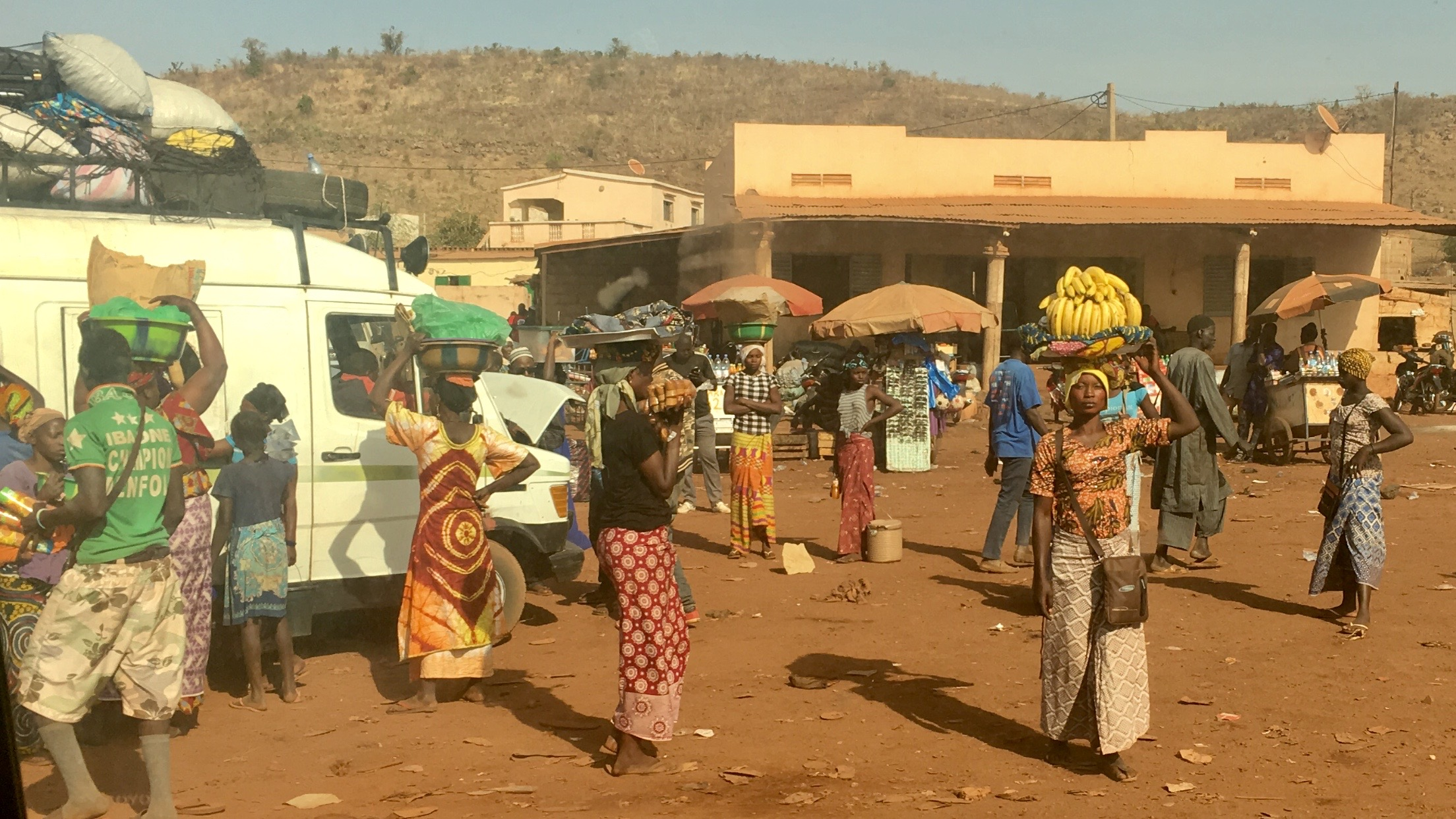
Street vendors in Kati.

Kati is the capital of the cercle of Kati. It is also a garrison city. The town has both a military hospital and a civil hospital. The town has several teaching facilities (many fundamental schools and a college). A youth club and arts centre were created with the support of the French co-operation.

Kati is a thriving market town. An important cattle market takes place every week. Kati is located on the Dakar-Niger Railway and on the road Bamako-Kolokani and Kati-Négéla-Kita.

== Demographics ==
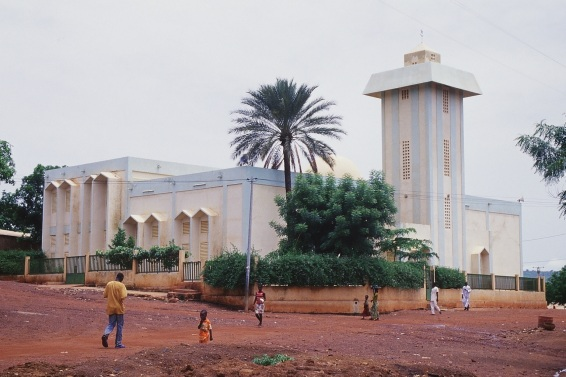
Kati Mosque.

The population is mainly Muslim, but with the presence of a Roman Catholic mission the Roman-Catholic community is also well established.

The population of Kati speaks primarily Bambara locally called Bamanankan.

== Society and government ==
Since 2009, the mayor of Kati has been Hamalla Haidara. It is represented in the National Assembly of Mali by Gouagnon Coulibaly.

It appears to have the headquarters of the 3rd Military Region of the Military of Mali.

=== 2004 CAOMJ Meetings ===
From December 27, 2004, to December 30, 2004, the "Coordination des associations, organisations et mouvements de la jeunesse de Kati" organinized a meeting for young people from Mali, Burkina Faso, Guinea, Côte d'Ivoire, Senegal and Togo. The previous meeting took place in December 2003 in Bobo-Dioulasso in Burkina Faso. The young people had committed themselves to contribute their share to find a solution for the problems their countries are facing, like health of the reproduction of young people and teenagers, AIDS, advancing of the desert, wars, illiteracy etcetera. The meeting of Kati focused on the role of young people in the reinforcement of African integration and their role in the fight against the turning of their countries into a desert.

== International relations ==
=== Twin towns – Sister cities ===
Kati is twinned with:

- Puteaux, France (since 1985)
- Erfurt, Germany (since 2011)

== Climate ==
Köppen-Geiger climate classification system classifies its climate as tropical wet and dry (Aw). The rainy season takes place in mid-year, from June to September. From July to September, it is the rainiest and the daytime temperatures are the least hot and nighttime temperatures are the least cold. Its hottest months are from February to May with average maximum temperatures above 37 °C (99 °F).

Climate data for Kati
Month	Jan	Feb	Mar	Apr	May	Jun	Jul	Aug	Sep	Oct	Nov	Dec	Year
Mean daily maximum °C (°F)	33.8 (92.8)	37.1 (98.8)	38.8 (101.8)	37.6 (99.7)	37.7 (99.9)	34.3 (93.7)	30.9 (87.6)	29.7 (85.5)	31.1 (88.0)	34.2 (93.6)	35.8 (96.4)	34 (93)	34.6 (94.2)
Daily mean °C (°F)	24.6 (76.3)	27.8 (82.0)	30.1 (86.2)	29.8 (85.6)	30.8 (87.4)	28.2 (82.8)	26 (79)	25.1 (77.2)	25.8 (78.4)	27.4 (81.3)	27.2 (81.0)	25 (77)	27.3 (81.2)
Mean daily minimum °C (°F)	15.5 (59.9)	18.5 (65.3)	21.5 (70.7)	22.1 (71.8)	23.9 (75.0)	22.1 (71.8)	21.1 (70.0)	20.6 (69.1)	20.6 (69.1)	20.6 (69.1)	18.6 (65.5)	16 (61)	20.1 (68.2)
Average precipitation mm (inches)	0 (0)	0 (0)	6 (0.2)	13 (0.5)	45 (1.8)	114 (4.5)	235 (9.3)	304 (12.0)	195 (7.7)	63 (2.5)	4 (0.2)	1 (0.0)	980 (38.7)
Source: Climate-Data.org, altitude: 442m

== Notable natives ==
- Chris Seydou, couturier.
- Doumbi Fakoly, writer.
- Mamadou Konaté, politician.
- Sadio Camara, military officer.

== See also ==
- Railway stations in Mali
- List of cities in Mali
