= Jama'at Nusrat al-Islam wal-Muslimin =

Militant jihadist organisation

- جماعة نصرة الإسلام والمسلمين
- White flag (above) currently used by the JNIM; Black flag (middle) and Jihadist flag (below) are also used by the JNIM
- Founders: Iyad Ag Ghali; Amadou Koufa; Djamel Okacha †; Abdelmalek Droukdel †
- Emir: Iyad Ag Ghali
- Second-in-command: Sedane Ag Hita
- Spokesperson: Bina Diarra
- Dates active: 2 March 2017 – present
- Merger of: Sahara Emirate Brigade (Part of Al-Qaeda in the Islamic Maghreb); Al-Mourabitoun Battalion (Part of Al-Qaeda in the Islamic Maghreb); Ansar Dine; Katiba Macina (Ansar Dine branch)
- Allegiance: Al-Qaeda
- Groups: Ansarul Islam; Katiba Macina; Nigerian Brigade
- Headquarters: Tinzaouaten
- Active regions: see territory of Jama'at Nusrat al-Islam wal-Muslimin Countries: Mali; Algeria; Niger; Guinea; Libya; Mauritania; Tunisia; Chad; Burkina Faso; Benin; Togo; Nigeria; Ivory Coast; Ghana (logistical and medical purposes only)
- Ideology: Salafi jihadism
- Size: 2,000–3,000 (2022 estimate); 5,000–6,000 (2024 estimate); ~10,000 (2026 estimate)
- Part of: al-Qaeda
- Wars: War in the Sahel; Mali War; 2026 Mali offensives; Killing of Sadio Camara; Islamist insurgency in Niger; Islamist insurgency in Burkina Faso; Jihadist insurgency in Northern Benin; Boko Haram insurgency; Al-Qaeda–Islamic State conflict; JNIM-ISGS war; Nigerian bandit conflict

Territories under the control of JNIM

Jama'at Nusrat al-Islam wal-Muslimin (JNIM; Arabic: جماعة نصرة الإسلام والمسلمين; French: Groupe de soutien à l'islam et aux musulmans, GSIM; lit. 'Support Group for Islam and Muslims') is a transnational united front of various Salafi jihadist organizations in the Maghreb and West Africa formed by the merger of Ansar Dine, al-Mourabitoun and the Saharan branch of al-Qaeda in the Islamic Maghreb. Its emir Iyad Ag Ghali swore allegiance to al-Qaeda's leader Ayman al-Zawahiri and the Taliban's leader Hibatullah Akhundzada in 2017.

In the early 2020s, JNIM was reported to be the fastest-growing militant organization in the world. As of 2025, it is considered the most heavily armed militant group in the Sahel and one of the most powerful globally. The group operates a decentralized proto-state model in areas under its control, enforcing a strict interpretation of Islamic law and taking over taxation. Its influence is presently expanding southward into coastal West African countries, including Benin and Togo.

== History ==
=== Founding ===
Jama'a Nusrat ul-Islam wa al-Muslimin (JNIM) was formed as a coalition of four Salafi-jihadist groups operating in West Africa that were supportive of Al-Qaeda. The groups that made up the merger were Ansar Dine (AAL), al-Mourabitoun, Katiba Macina (FLM), and the Saharan branch of al-Qaeda in the Islamic Maghreb (AQIM).

On 2 March 2017, JNIM announced its formation in a video declaring its bay'ah (pledge of allegiance) to al-Qaeda's top leader Ayman al-Zawahiri, AQIM leader Abdelmalek Droukdel, and Taliban leader Hibatullah Akhundzada. Five militant leaders were present in this video; Ansar Dine emir Iyad Ag Ghali, Katiba Macina emir Amadou Koufa, deputy emir of al-Mourabitoun Abu Hassan al-Ansari, deputy emir of al-Qaeda in the Islamic Maghreb Djamel Okacha, and prominent AQIM "judge" Abu Abdulrahman al-Sanhaji. They also praised prominent slain al-Qaeda leaders such as Osama bin Laden and Abu Musab al-Zarqawi.

On 16 March, the AQIM leadership released an audio message approving the merger. On 19 March, al-Qaeda issued a statement approving the new group and accepting their bay'ah.

Ghali was appointed as the emir of JNIM, and Koufa as the deputy-emir. Ghali is from the Ifoghas clan of the Tuaregs in northern Mali, and Koufa is a Fulani from central Mali. Ansari was a Tilemsi Arab from Gao Region. Okacha and Sanhaji were both longtime militants in AQIM and its predecessor, the Salafist Group for Preaching and Combat; Okacha is an Algerian Arab, and Sanhaji is Moroccan. All five had fought in the early stages of the Mali War.

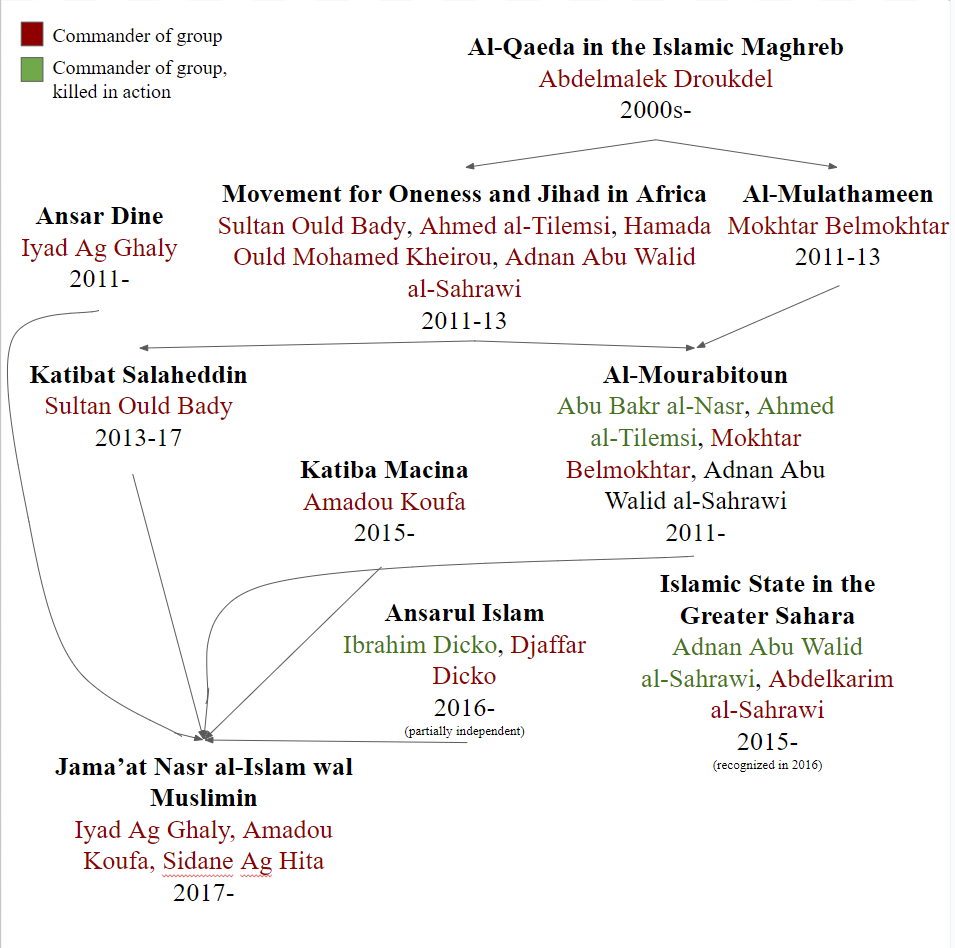
The genealogy of JNIM, showing its roots in Al-Mourabitoun, Ansar Dine and Ansarul Islam

Two leaders sanctioned by the US Treasury's office were named as Ali Maychou and Bah Ag Moussa. Moussa was a former Malian army colonel who led an operation in March 2019 against the Malian Armed Forces base in Dioura that killed at least 21 Malian soldiers. Maychou was a native of Morocco who had claimed responsibility for a JNIM attack on a military camp that housed Malian troops in Gao, killing dozens. The Treasury office said Maychou held an operational role in JNIM's activities, while Moussa acted on behalf of JNIM's leader Iyad Ag Ghali. In 2021, two additional leaders were designated as Specially Designated Global Terrorists: Sidan Ag Hitta and Salem ould Breihmatt.

On 30 October 2020, the French government declared that 50 JNIM jihadists were killed in central Mali during an operation Barkhane action. The French force also confiscated arms and material and captured four of the jihadists live. French authorities confirmed the death of a key JNIM leader Bah ag Moussa with four of his group. He was in charge of terrorist operations and training new extremist recruits.

== Activity ==
From 2017 to 2023, JNIM was responsible for more than half of all violent events across the Sahel region, notably due to increased capabilities in using roadside bombs, mortars, landmines and rockets. It had its most violent interactions with Burkina Faso's military (1,762 times) and the Malian army (945 times). It also targets volunteer fighting groups as well as communities it considers sympathetic to the state.

On 29 March 2021, a force of about 100 members raided a camp of UN Peacekeepers in Northern Mali, approximately 200 kilometres (120 mi) from the Algerian border. Four of the Chadian Peacekeepers were killed in the assault, and 34 wounded. Initial reports suggested that approximately 20 of the jihadists had been killed, a number that was later revised to 40, including Abdallaye Ag Albaka. Ag Albaka was described as "a right-hand man" to Iyad Ag Ghali, and unofficially as the Number 3 man in the organization.

On 26 April 2021, David Beriáin, Roberto Fraile and Rory Young were killed following an ambush by the JNIM on their convoy in eastern Burkina Faso, near the Benin border.

On 5 September 2023, at least 50 Burkina Faso soldiers were killed in clashes in Yatenga Province.

On 7 September 2023, at least 154 civilians and fifteen Malian soldiers were killed when JNIM militants simultaneously attacked a Malian military camp at Bamba and the civilian boat Tombouctou on the Niger River near the village of Banikane, Gourma-Rharous.

On 26 November 2023, JNIM militants launched a major assault on the city of Djibo in Burkina Faso, resulting in at least 40 civilian deaths. The siege of Djibo began in February 2022.

Islamic State in the Greater Sahara serves as an opponent to JNIM and while it does not have the same strength and capabilities of JNIM, it is similar to JNIM and the strategy it uses. Ghaly has stated that JNIM's strategy is to expand its presence across West Africa and train militants to fight against the group's enemies while appeasing local communities by giving them material resources and signing local agreements. JNIM regularly attacks French, multinational, and local security forces in West Africa, as well as local and foreign civilians in the region.

In June 2024, JNIM fighters claimed to have killed more than 100 soldiers at an army base in the northern region of Mansila near Niger. Security analysts said it was one of the deadliest attacks on government forces ever in the region. JNIM also claimed to have captured seven soldiers and seized weapons and ammunition.

JNIM claimed in July 2024 a "complex ambush" had wiped out a convoy during the Battle of Tinzaouaten, killing 50 Russians and a number of Malian soldiers, and published videos showing several vehicles ablaze as well as dozens of bodies in the area. A Tuareg militant group spokesman said some Malian troops and Russian fighters had also been captured during the battle. According to some unofficial Russian Telegram channels, as many as 80 Russians were killed. That would make it by far the worst loss for Russian paramilitaries in several years of operating in Africa, as the Kremlin has sought to use proxy forces to challenge Western influence across the Sahel and central Africa and prop up unstable regimes.

On 24 August 2024, JNIM launched a major attack on people given the responsibility of digging trenches for the protection of security outposts in the region of Barsalogho, Burkina Faso, killing at least 600 soldiers and civilians.

JNIM attacked a military training camp near the airport in Mali's capital in September 2024 as explosions were heard in the area. Within hours, the government announced it was temporarily closing the airport in Bamako. The whole attack lasted for 9 hours and 100+ were killed and wounded. At least 15 people were arrested in connection with the attack. JNIM took responsibility through their media.

On 18 April 2025, Jama'at Nasr al-Islam wal-Muslimin claimed responsibility for coordinated attacks on two military posts in northeastern Benin, resulting in the deaths of 70 soldiers, according to the SITE Intelligence Group. The assaults occurred in Kandi province, Alibori department, approximately 500 kilometers from the capital, Cotonou. This marks the deadliest attack attributed to jihadist groups in Benin since the expansion of Sahel-based insurgencies into coastal West African states.

The conflict, which began in Mali in 2012 and spread to Burkina Faso and Niger, has increasingly destabilized regions further south, including Benin and Togo. The broader insurgency has caused widespread displacement and contributed to political instability in the region, including several military coups between 2020 and 2023.

JNIM utilizes the Starlink satellite internet system for communications. According to a report by Le Monde; this is because it had been recently found to be more practical and affordable than the usage of satellite phones. The use of Starlink has enabled the organization to communicate in areas where security forces have no network. Observers have noted a "lack of rigor in verifying identities" and many loopholes in Starlink's subscription system, which has allowed armed groups to exploit it.

In October 2025, JNIM's Nigerian Brigade claimed responsibility for an attack that killed one Nigerian soldier while also seizing weapons and cash in central Nigeria, its first known attack in the country.

In April 2026, JNIM's fighters launched a massive offensive throughout Mali. The assault was unprecedented as several cities hundreds of kilometres apart were concurrently attacked. JNIM was supported by the Azawad Liberation Front (FLA), a group composed of pro-independence Tuareg people. The strategic urban areas that were the target of the offensive were Kidal and Gao in the north, Sévaré in the centeral regions, and Bamako and Kati in the south.

Kati is a garrison town that is home to Camp Soundiata Keïta. This is the largest military base in Mali, located just 20 km from the capital. During the dawn attack, the Mali Defense Minister Sadio Camara, the second most powerful figure in the Mali government, was killed by an explosion targeting his residence. In the north, the Azawad Liberation Front declared that they had seized the town of Kidal. Regional security analysts described the joint JNIM-FLA offensive as a "stinging defeat for the junta".

== Aims and support ==
The Center for Strategic and International Studies describes JNIM as "an al Qaeda-affiliated Salafi-jihadist insurgent organization that seeks to replace established state authority with a conservative interpretation of Islamic law." A June 2025 report by Africa Confidential observed that JNIM appears to be publicly distancing itself from al-Qaeda, in an effort to mirror the successful strategy of Hay’at Tahrir al-Sham in Syria. This shift is reportedly intended to facilitate tactical alliances with insurgent groups such as the Azawad Liberation Front (FLA), which, although initially secular, shares JNIM's opposition to the Malian government.

In this context, JNIM communiqués have increasingly omitted references to al-Qaeda. In a 2025 interview with France24, the group's ideological leader, Amadou Koufa, declined to comment on JNIM ties to the organization. Some analysts interpret these moves as part of a broader effort to rebrand JNIM, in the eyes of a Malian audience, as a domestically focused insurgency rather than a transnational jihadist organization.

In 2025, observers and refugees reported that JNIM's recruitment was bolstered by the war crimes carried out by state-backed militias, particularly their targeting of Fulani communities—a predominantly Muslim, semi-nomadic ethnic group spread across West Africa. Although initially rejected by many locals, JNIM gained support in areas where pro-government forces carried out widespread civilian killings. These attacks drove many disillusioned Fulani, including entire families, to join the group. One Burkinabe refugee recounted how his daughters and their husbands aligned with JNIM after militias killed dozens of fellow Fulani, stating: “They were afraid, and they ran to them.”

JNIM has formed alliances with local communities and the Tuareg or other ethnic factions. In January 2023, some clans in northern Mali were reported to have pledged allegiance to the group. Despite these developments, the Africa Center for Strategic Studies reported in 2022 that JNIM did not enjoy broad popular support. The Economist Intelligence Unit observed that JNIM was generally more accepted by local populations than Islamic State-affiliated groups. It noted that JNIM had integrated into local rebel networks with deep community ties, while IS-linked factions were often viewed as foreign to the region.

The rivalry between the JNIM and IS has caused the region to become the global epicenter of terrorism, now accounting for over half of all terrorism-related deaths, according to the Global Terrorism Index (GTI). In 2023, the region recorded 3,885 fatalities out of 7,555 worldwide, a nearly tenfold increase since 2019. The rise in extremist violence is driven by the expansion of groups like ISIS-Sahel and Jama'at Nusrat al-Islam wal Muslimeen (JNIM), which compete for land and impose strict Sharia governance. Political instability, weak governance, and military coups in Mali, Burkina Faso, Guinea, and Niger have further fueled the insurgency.

These groups finance operations through ransom kidnappings, illicit gold mining, and drug trafficking, with the Sahel now a major route for cocaine smuggling from South America to Europe. Meanwhile, regional governments have shifted from Western alliances to Russia and China, relying on paramilitary groups like the Africa Corps (formerly Wagner) for security assistance, though with little success. The violence is now spreading to neighboring countries like Togo and Benin, raising concerns about further regional destabilization.

In October 2025, Western officials told the Wall Street Journal that the United Arab Emirates flew the equivalent of $23 million in cash to Mali to pay a ransom for a member of the ruling Emirati House of Maktoum. The officials said Malian hostages were also released. Justyna Gudzowska, executive director of The Sentry, told the Journal the ransom payment "comes at the worst possible time" given JNIM's military ascendance, and that "Such a large injection of resources is a huge boon for the group and will enable its extremist ambitions on the continent."

== See also ==
- Territory of Jama'at Nusrat al-Islam wal-Muslimin
- Islamist insurgency in the Sahel
- Jihadist insurgency in Burkina Faso
- Harakat al-Shabaab al-Mujahideen
- List of Islamist terrorist attacks
