= Battle of Konna =

Battle during the Northern Mali Conflict in January 2013

Coordinates: 14.9500°N 3.8833°W

- Part of the Northern Mali conflict
- Two French Air Force Rafale fighters, below, prepare to break formation after refueling with a U.S. Air Force KC-135 Stratotanker over Mali on April 23, 2013.
| Date | 10–18 January 2013 (1 week and 1 day) |
| Location | Konna, Mali |
| Result | Malian/French victory: Islamists capture Konna and hold it for a week; Islamist advance is halted by French air-strikes; Malian army retakes Konna; Beginning of French-led intervention in Mali |

Belligerents
| Mali; Malian Army; France; French Army | Islamists groups: Ansar Dine; MOJWA; AQIM; Boko Haram |

Commanders and leaders
| (Mali) Dioncounda Traoré (France) François Hollande (France) Jean-Yves Le Drian | Iyad Ag Ghaly; Omar Ould Hamaha; Abdel 'Kojak' Krim †; Hammadoun Kufa; Souleymane keita |

Strength
| (Mali) 2,000 Malian Army soldiers, 30 armored vehicles (France) 4th Special Forces Helicopter Regiment: 100 French Special Forces; 4 Gazelle helicopters; 1 Tiger helicopter; 6 Mirage 2000D fighter jets | Estimated 1,200 fighters 300 vehicles |

Casualties and losses
| (Mali) 58 soldiers killed, 60 + injured (civilian/military estimate) (France) 1 pilot killed, 1 helicopter lost | 50–150 dead ~50 vehicles destroyed |
- 15 civilians dead Total: 149 killed overall

The Battle of Konna was a battle in the Northern Mali Conflict fought in January 2013 in the town of Konna in central Mali. Various Islamic fundamentalist rebels fought against the government of Mali, which was supported by French soldiers participating in Operation Serval. This battle was among the first French engagements in their intervention in the Mali War.

The fighting started when rebel fighters disguised as passengers on a public bus infiltrated the town. The bus was stopped at a Malian army checkpoint on the outskirts of Konna. As soldiers entered the bus to search it, the Islamists opened fire, killing the soldiers. Additional rebels then poured into the town. After several hours of fighting, the Malian army was routed to its base, abandoning the town to the rebels and reportedly leaving several heavy weapons and armored vehicles behind. Around 25 Malian soldiers were killed.

An estimated 1,200 Islamist fighters advanced to within 20 kilometers of Mopti, a Mali military garrison town.

The battle ended in a victory for the Malian government and France, with rebel fighters driven out of the town.

== Background ==
On January 1, 2013, representatives of Ansar Dine presented two main demands to the Malian government through Burkinabe mediator President Blaise Compaoré: the proclamation of 'the Islamic character of the Malian State in the constitution' and autonomy for the Azawad region. The Malian government rejected these demands. Consequently, on 3 January 2013, Ansar Dine leader Iyad Ag Ghali declared an end to the ceasefire, citing the government's "bad faith".

On the 4th, Ansar Dine handed over a document to the Burkinabè mediator and president Blaise Compaoré in which it called for the autonomy of Azawad and the application of Sharia law in northern Mali. However, since January 2nd, from the regions of Gao and Timbuktu, the jihadist forces of Ansar Dine, Movement of Oneness and Jihad in Western Africa (MUJAO), Al-Qaeda in the Islamic Maghreb (AQIM) and Boko Haram were gathering in Bambara Maoudé. On the 7th, about fifty of their vehicles passed Douentza and positioned themselves at Dangol Boré, facing the Malian army. For added discretion, jihadist pickups avoided forming in columns, instead opting to move in wooded areas in small groups in scattered formation so as not to be signaled by plumes of smoke. The pickup trucks were camouflaged by being covered with mud and the fighters hid under tent cloths to escape the infrared vision.

== Forces in presence ==
Malian forces were expected to fight in the region of Mopti, command provided by Colonel Major Didier Dacko. Commander Abass Dembélé headed the Malian forces of the Volunteer Commandos Group (GCV,) Kassim Goïta, Gao's regiment, Elysé Daou, the National Guard and Captain Pascal Berthe,and the artillery. The Malian forces consisted mainly of soldiers of the 62nd Motorized Infantry Regiment, as well as elements of the 35th Armored Regiment and the 36th Artillery Regiment. In December 2012, the newspaper Jeune Afrique reported that according to a military source, more than 2,000 soldiers were present in Konna.

The number of Salafist fighters is not known precisely. Shortly before the offensive, the DGSE estimated that the jihadists amounted to around 1,500 near the demarcation line, including 300 men from AQIM and 600 from MUJAO. 30 pick-ups formed the vanguard, supported by a reserve of 40 other vehicles in Douentza, while 80 other pick-ups were then detached to take part in the Battle of Diabaly. Malian services estimated the jihadist forces at about 5,000 men. According to a report from the French Senate on 23 April 2013, 1,500 to 3,000 jihadists were mobilized for the offensives in southern Mali. The strength of the Salafist rebels was initially estimated at 1,200 men according to RFI and Al Jazeera. On the night of 9 January to 10 January, a teacher near Dangol-Boré said he had counted more than 300 jihadist vehicles. According to the reporter Jean-Paul Mari, the assailants initially gathered 70 vehicles around Bambara Maoudé then engaged 150, including 70 from Ansar Dine, in the assault on Konna. According to Laurent Touchard, the jihadist forces gathered north of the demarcation line were 1,500 to 2,500 men with 300 vehicles. Their forces were made up of some of the most seasoned and well-equipped combatants, with recruits usually left behind to hold the cities.

Shortly before the attack, various chiefs met briefly at Lere Iyad Ag Ghali, emir of Ansar Dine, as well as Djamel Okacha and Abu Zeid who took command of the detachment which would attack the city of Diabaly. Iyad Ag Ghali was the main initiator of the offensive, the leaders of AQIM and MUJAO agreed to join but without enthusiasm, as they had decided to consolidate their positions in the north. However, even though the Salafist objective was not known with certainty, two hypotheses were supposed by the DGSE. According to the first, the goal of the jihadists was to seize Bamako and take control of the country, according to the second, the offensive was only aimed at the cities of Mopti and Sévaré and the international airport of Mopti Ambodédjo, the only airport in central Mali, whose takeover would greatly handicap the deployment of a possible international intervention.

== The battle ==
=== Konna's capture by Islamists ===
On January 8, 2013, jihadists were near the demarcation line in the Mopti region. Malian soldiers carried out some warning shots and reinforcements were sent. For their part, the fighters of Ansar Dine fired some artillery and rockets during the night. On the 9th, at the end of the afternoon, Lieutenant-Colonel Mamadou Samaké made a reconnaissance mission with a dozen BRDM-2 armored vehicles. The Malian soldiers did not meet any opposition from the jihadists and therefore turned around. But on their way back, they fell into an ambush. All of the Islamist forces crossed the line and attacked the city of Konna. The jihadists reached Konna in the night of 9 to 10 January. On the 10th, the clashes began at 8:30 am and ended at 4 pm. The jihadists attacked from three directions, the first column attacked north, by the road of Korientzé, a village in the municipality of Korombana, the second column attacked to the east, by the road of Douentza, while a third bypassed the south to cut off the retreat of the garrison. To the west, the Niger River made the area impassable.

According to the Malian government, a bus carrying jihadists managed to infiltrate the city. According to Jean-Paul Mari, around 1 pm, two buses entered the city after being controlled by Malian soldiers, but it turns out that the 14 occupants of these buses were AQIM fighters disguised as civilians. Arriving at a checkpoint in the middle of the military, they opened fire on sixty soldiers before being in turn cut down by the Malians. This version is also defended by Jean-Christophe Notin, it is however contested by Laurent Touchard, according to whom "the aggressor tumbles while the identity of the passengers of the bus - true civilians - is being checked. The bus in question is also targeted by the men of Iyad Ag Ghaly. " Street fighting took place in the city, but Malian soldiers were overwhelmed, disorganized and ran out of ammunition, and their radio messages were intercepted by jihadists. Around 11 am, the Malians began their withdrawal. The fighting lasted until 4 pm and by 5 pm the Islamist forces controlled the entire city. Outside the city, Lieutenant-Colonel Samaké, almost out of ammunition, also managed to retreat with his armored vehicles. Malian troops were in full retreat towards Sévaré.

=== Jihadist coalition advances in Sevare and Mopti and Operation Serval ===
However, the jihadist offensive in southern Mali provoked France's entry into the war. On January 11, the French army launched Operation Serval. Air forces were immediately engaged and from January 10 and 11, Special Forces soldiers transported by planes were dropped at Sévaré. On the morning of January 11, Mopti and Sévaré found themselves directly threatened. Only 70 French Special Forces soldiers held the Mopti Ambodédjo International Airport, while the Malian army deployed two T-55 tanks and three BM-21 multiple rocket launchers as artillery. If the jihadists seized Mopti, there would be no defences to oppose their progression to Bamako. Both sides also received reinforcements on 11 January. On the side of the Malians, were 300 "red beret" soldiers of the 33rd Commando-Parachutist Regiment with about twenty armored BRDM-2 vehicles. The Ansar Dine fighters were reinforced by 500 men from MUJAO and AQIM. COS personnel in Sévaré also increased to about 100 men, mainly from the 1st Marine Infantry Parachute Regiment ( 1st RPIMa), the 13th Parachute Dragoon Regiment ( 13th DPR), the Air Parachute Commando No. 10 (CPA-10) and the Marine Commandos of the ESNO 43.

The jihadists then continued their progress and headed towards the cities of Mopti and Sévaré. In the morning, two Malian Mi-24 helicopters, freshly repaired, took off in Bamako and reached Sévaré. At the request of the French, they then went to Konna to attack a group of around one hundred men spotted by an Atlantic-2, celebrating their victory. Around 9 am, the helicopters reached Konna and opened fire on the Salafist fighters, they inflicted losses but also killed some civilians. After their mission was accomplished, they then returned to Sévaré. In the afternoon, the French in turn deployed Gazelle helicopters from the 4th Special Forces Helicopter Regiment to counter the jihadist advance between Konna and Sévaré. Around 2 pm, two aircraft took off in Djibo, Burkina Faso, which, around 4 pm, attacked a group of jihadist pick-ups. However the French flew low, without ground support, and the jihadists had anti-aircraft batteries on some of their vehicles. During the following firefight, a pickup truck was destroyed and its four occupants were killed by a HOT missile, however both Gazelle helicopters were also damaged by ground fire. The co-pilot of the first helicopter was seriously injured by a bullet from an AK-47, and the aircraft managed to reach the nearest French military medical support, but the wounded French soldier, Lieutenant Damien Boiteux, then succumbed to his injuries. The second helicopter crash-landed north of Sévaré, but the crew escaped and were recovered by special forces on the ground. The French then withdrew to Sévaré after destroying their equipment. Two more Gazelle helicopters were engaged soon after and fired with their HOT missiles and 20mm guns, destroying a total of four jihadist vehicles. The jihadists gave up the fight and fell back to Konna and Douentza. Then in the evening, Mirage 2000-D jets based in Ndjamena, Chad came into action. The first two aircraft took off around 19:15 local time. At around 10 pm, they dropped two bombs on a Konna building which had served as headquarters for Ansar Dine. The building was ravaged and several vehicles at the entrance were destroyed. The planes continued their strikes and then bombarded a logistics depot. Around midnight, a second wave of Mirages destroyed four more buildings. The fishing port, the military and administrative buildings, the sub-prefecture and its surroundings were particularly targeted.

According to local reports, the strikes killed at least ten people. Several Islamist fighters panicked and fled, while a big part of the mercenaries recruited by Ansar Dine disbanded. Some fugitives are thought to have drowned in the river. On 11 January, French Aérospatiale Gazelle helicopters armed with 20mm cannons, possibly from the 4th Special Forces Helicopter Regiment, stopped an Islamist column advancing to Mopti. The four Mirage 2000-D jets operating from a base in Chad also conducted airstrikes. 12 targets were hit by the Mirages during the night between the 11th and the 12th. The French chief of army staff, Admiral Guillaud, announced that the Islamists had withdrawn from Konna and retreated several dozen kilometres to the north. On January 12, the staff of the Malian army claimed the capture of the city of Konna, however, on January 15, French Defense Minister Jean-Yves Le Drian denied the information. On the night of January 12 to 13, the 2000D Mirages based in Ndjamena struck new targets between Konna and Léré. As early as January 13, Konna began to be abandoned by jihadists (according to testimonies of residents). The remaining jihadists were positioned around the city. In the following days, some of them would continue to appear in small numbers in Konna, mainly in order to obtain water and food.and 10 civilians were also killed.

A Malian lieutenant said that mopping up operations were taking places around Konna. In addition, French special forces were reported to be on the ground. According to analysts, the French were forced to act sooner than planned because of the importance of Sévaré military airport for further operations. On 15 January, the French defense minister confirmed that the Malian military had still not recaptured Konna from rebel forces, despite earlier claims that they did.

=== Recapturing Konna from the terrorists ===
On the evening of January 16, the French-Malian forces launched the offensive on Konna. 400 Malian soldiers commanded by Colonel Dacko left Sévaré, supported by forty or so French Special Forces soldiers, including a dozen Marine Commandos of the 1st RPIMa. In the late afternoon, they clashed with Salafist groups near Dengaourou village, located in a wooded area about forty kilometers from Konna. The fight continued through the night. Two Malian soldiers were killed at the beginning of the clash, including one by sniper fire. However, the positions of jihadists were identified by the French special forces and reported to the Malian artillery, which included multiple BM-21 rocket launch trucks. The Salafists were crushed by artillery fire, and a total of 14 of their pick-up trucks were destroyed. After several hours of fighting, the jihadists retreated, and were pursued by helicopters. Shortly before dawn, the two Mi-24s attacked a group of twelve pickups and destroyed four. Additionally, a French Tiger and Gazelle neutralized two other vehicles. The losses of jihadists were unknown, and only four bodies were found according to French soldiers, while a Malian captain told AFP the day after the fight that six Islamists were killed, eight of their vehicles captured and several more destroyed. In view of the number of pickups destroyed, their actual losses were probably greater, with jihadists having probably taken away most of their dead. On the evening of January 17, French and Malian troops regained possession of Konna, abandoned by Islamist troops. The Malian forces entered first, at around 5 o clock PM, followed by three French vehicles and four Malian vehicles that closed the march. The military was welcomed by residents who brandished Malian and French flags. On the morning of the 18th, only eight Islamists were still in the city, and four of them fled to Douentza by stealing two motorbikes, while the four others fled after threatening with their weapons to young people who wanted to lynch them. The next day, the city was entirely controlled by the Franco-Malian forces. On 18 January, the Malian army released a statement claiming to have complete control of Konna again. The claim was also confirmed by residents of Konna.

== Aftermath and casualties ==
The French reported one casualty during the battle: Lieutenant Damien Boiteux, co-pilot of a Gazelle helicopter, fatally wounded on 11 January. On January 12, the Malian army, indicated in an initial assessment that 11 of its soldiers were killed and about sixty were wounded, and it also estimated the Islamist losses at a hundred killed. However, this report is challenged by testimonies of residents who claimed to have counted more corpses dressed in uniforms. According to the French colonel who commanded the special forces detachment at Sévaré, Colonel Didier Dacko told him on January 10 that his losses were 20 dead and about 60 wounded. According to a "regional security source" of the AFP, at least 46 Islamists died in fighting fought from January 10 to 12, while according to a resident of Konna dozens of bodies were left in the city. 6 other Islamists were killed in the night of 16 to 17 according to the statements of Malian officers. According to a report by Human Rights Watch, three child soldiers enlisted by the Islamists died during the clashes. On January 12, a merchant from Konna told Reuters that he counted 148 dead, including several dozen Malian army soldiers. Another witness, named Mohammed, claims to have counted 47 bodies of Malian soldiers in the city. According to residents of Konna, about 50 vehicles were destroyed by air strikes. According to some residents, 36 Malian soldiers were buried in Sama.

According to a military source, 58 Malian soldiers were killed in the fighting. On January 14, according to a Malian newspaper, 101 jihadists, 11 Malian soldiers and a French pilot were killed during the battle. According to the newspaper Nouvelle Libération, from January 11 to 14, the jihadists lost 130 men, including Firhoun, the adopted son of Iyad Ag Ghali, as well as 30 vehicles and 4 BRDM-2s destroyed. Among the dead was one of the Ansar Dine commanders, Abdel Krim, known as Kojak. Severely wounded in the fighting at Konna, he succumbed to his injuries in the Gao Hospital. According to other sources, Kojak would be Mohamed Ag Aghaly Ag Wambadja. On the 13th, contacted by Sahara Media, leaders of Ansar Dine confirm that Kojak and four of his fighters were killed on January 10 during the fighting against the Malian military. On January 15, the Ansar Dine movement publishes a video that it claims to have filmed the day before in Konna. An Islamist leader, Abu El Habib Sidi Mohamed, who claimed to be a member of Ansar Edine's communication commission, said the movement still held the city and showed several armored vehicles taken from the Malian army. He stated that only five fighters of his movement were killed and that seven civilians died during a French bombardment. On January 19, Ansar Dine claimed to have killed 25 Malian soldiers in Konna in the fighting on January 10 and also captured 11 vehicles, 6 tanks and a large quantity of ammunition, they also estimated that 60 Malian soldiers were killed, several dozen others wounded, two French helicopters shot down and recognized only a loss of 8 men in all fighting since January 10. However, according to Laurent Touchard, the "tanks" that Ansar Dine claims as taking were in fact armored BRDM-2 and BTR-60PB 3. According to Human Rights Watch, at least 10 civilians were also killed in the fighting on January 11 and 12, including three children drowning while attempting to cross the Niger River. Amnesty International said that at least five civilians, including three children, were killed by aerial bombardment on 11 January. According to Jean-Christophe Notin, these five civilians were not killed by French air strikes but were shot by Mi-24 helicopters from the Malian army. In February 2013, Konna Mayor Ibrahima Diakité said that 15 civilians were killed and 19 injured during the Battle of Konna, he also estimated that at least 502 Islamists were killed. This last estimate is probably based on the testimony of a resident of Konna, who claimed to have been asked by the jihadists to help wash their bodies on the night of January 10, before the French intervention. He estimates that he counted 502 bodies which were then taken to Douentza. 71 people, wounded during the fighting in Konna, are sent to the hospital of Mopti according to the International Committee of the Red Cross.

== Executions ==
According to Human Rights Watch (HRW), seven Malian soldiers, including five wounded, were summarily executed by Islamists during the capture of the city. According to local residents, several Islamist prisoners or suspects were killed by Malian soldiers in military camps in Sévaré, including wounded taken in Konna, witnesses evoke in particular a mass grave of 25 to 30 bodies or corpses thrown in wells. According to HRW, at least 13 people were summarily executed by Malian soldiers and five others disappeared between 9 and 18 January in Sévaré, Konna and the surrounding villages.
