= Abass Dembélé =

Malian colonel

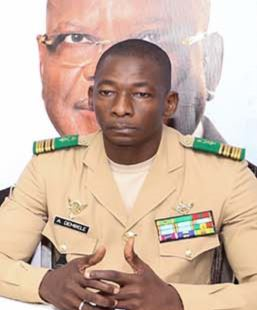

Governor of Mopti Region
- In office December 2020 – August 2025
- Preceded by: Sidi Alassane Touré

Personal details
- Awards: National Order of Mali (2014)

Military service
- Rank: Colonel-Major
- Battles/wars: Mali War: Battle of Konna

Abass Dembélé is a colonel-major in the Malian Armed Forces and was the governor of Mopti Region from 2020 until 2025.

== Biography ==
Dembélé is the son of colonel Koké Dembélé, the former chancellor of the National Order of Mali. He was trained in France and the United States, studying counter-terrorism. In 2012, he held the rank of commander and led the 61st Infantry Regiment from Sévaré. During the 2012 Tuareg rebellion, Didier Dacko put Dembélé at the head of a group of volunteer commandos and a company of Malian special forces. These forces played a key role in Malian victory at the Battle of Konna, where Dembélé was injured but remained at the front.

Dembélé was responsible for the arrest and imprisonment of Amadou Sanogo, who led the 2012 Malian coup d'état, on November 27, 2013. Dembélé received the National Order of Mali in February 2014. In late 2015, he graduated from the Ecole de Guerre in France. In 2016, he was promoted to the Koulikoro Military School of Administration, and then appointed commander of Tombouctou Region in 2017. He served in Timbuktu until 2019.

In January 2020, Dembélé joined the team of the High Representative of the Head of State of Mali, supervised by Dioncounda Traoré. In December 2020, he was appointed governor of Mopti Region. He was forced to flee the region after massive protests broke out against his administration in June 2022. Dembélé was present at the ceremony marking the end of MINUSMA in Mopti Region.

During August 2025, he was arrested after being accused of planning a coup d'etat against the Malian government.
