= Bombardment of Gao =

2013 French campaign in West Africa

- Part of Mali War
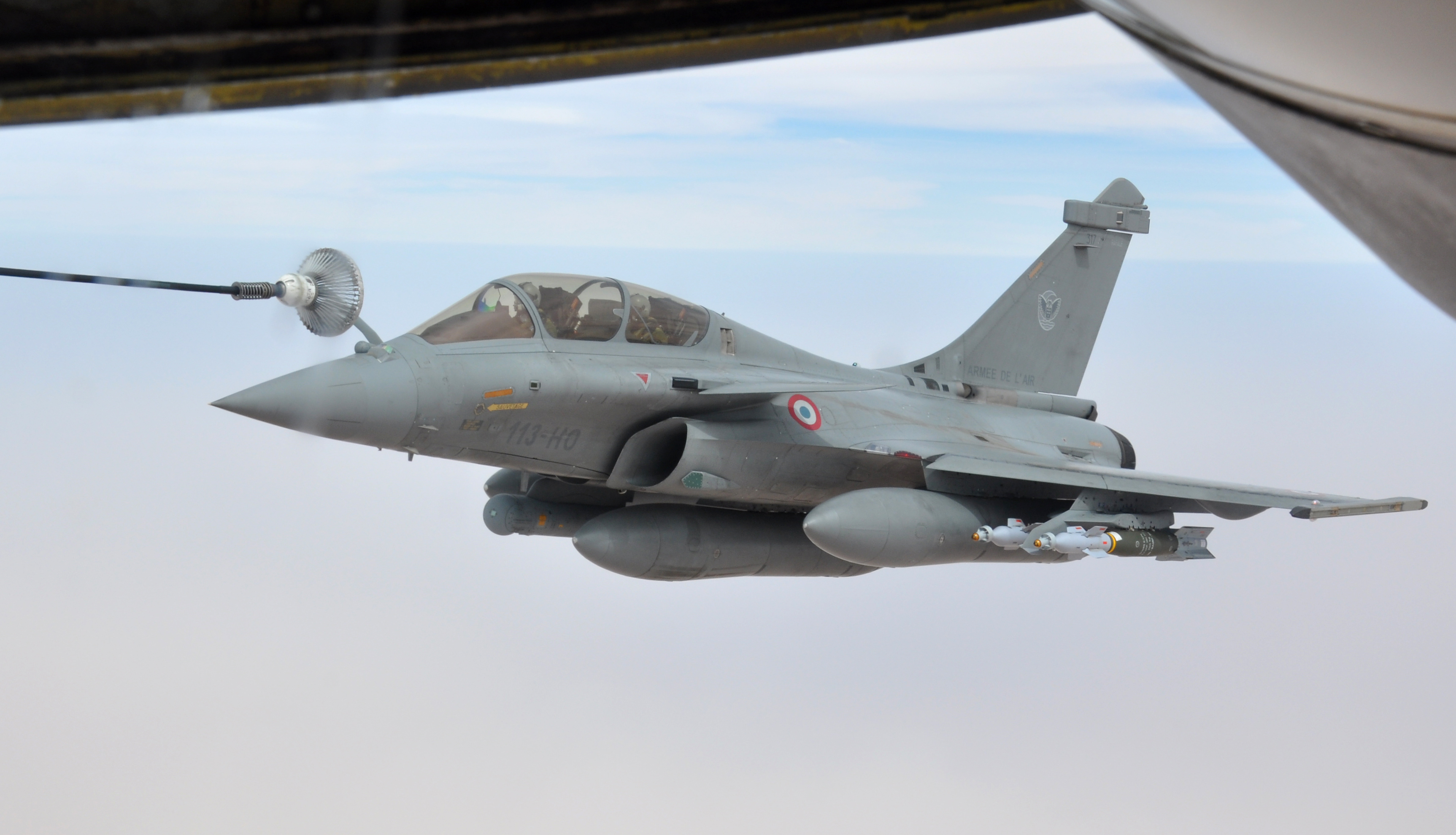
- French Rafale refueling, circa 2013
Date	January 13, 2013
Location	Gao and outskirts, Gao Region, Mali
Result	French victory

Belligerents
France; French Air and Space Force	MOJWA

Units involved
4 Rafale fighter jets	Unknown

Casualties and losses
None	60+ killed

On January 13, 2013, as one of the first actions of French intervention in Mali, French planes bombed the city of Gao, which was controlled by the jihadist Movement for Oneness and Jihad in West Africa (MOJWA).

== Background ==
In early 2012, moderate Tuareg rebels of the National Movement for the Liberation of Azawad (MNLA) launched an offensive against Malian forces in northern Mali, capturing swathes of territory including the cities of Kidal and Ménaka. The rebellion was quickly hijacked by jihadist groups such as Ansar Dine and MOJWA, which sought to create an Islamic state in northern Mali. The capture of the cities of Timbuktu and Gao by these groups pushed French forces to intervene in Mali, pushing the rebels back at the city of Konna. On the same day of the Gao bombings, French forces also bombed an Ansar Dine base in Aghabo, Kidal Region.

== Bombardment ==
On the morning of January 13, four Rafale fighter jets took off from Saint-Dizier in France and headed towards Mali, accompanied by tankers. Two of the aircraft were equipped with air-to-surface missiles and two were equipped with laser-guided bombs. The aircraft flew over Morocco and Mauritania to avoid Algerian airspace. They refueled three times during the journey; once over Spain, once over Mauritania and again near the Mauritanian-Malian border. Around six hours after takeoff, French forces bombed several areas in and around Gao. The strikes lasted a total of forty minutes, and twelve laser-guided bombs and nine air-to-surface missiles were launched.

French defense minister Jean-Yves Le Drian stated that "training camps, infrastructure and logistics depots constituting the rear bases of the terrorist groups" were destroyed during the bombardment. Following the strikes, the planes flew eastward for around two hours before landing at the N'Djamena airbase around 4:30pm.

The jihadists in the town were surprised at the bombings, and suffered heavy losses. Residents stated that more than sixty jihadists were killed in the strikes in the town of Gao, and more died in the bases on the outskirts. Jihadists who survived the attacks sought refuge in the houses of civilians, and only came back out during nightfall to bury the bodies of their comrades.

== Aftermath ==
A regional security source stated that the most deaths were at the military camp in Gao. At the time of the bombings, the jihadists were in the middle of a meeting. Many of those in the meeting were killed. Another source corroborated the heavy casualties at the military camp, and stated that the toll of sixty dead was not an exaggeration, and that the real death toll was much higher.

Residents of Gao stated there were no civilian casualties during the bombings. Some residents cheered at the strikes, and looted the Gao police station. The Firhoun and Bourem military camps were destroyed, and another camp in the center of Gao was destroyed.
