= Sampara =

- Village
- Location in Mali
- Coordinates: 14°42′13″N 4°2′45″W
- Country: Mali
- Region: Mopti Region
- Cercle: Mopti Cercle
- Commune: Bassirou
- Time zone: UTC+0 (GMT)

Sampara is a village and seat of the commune of Bassirou in the Cercle of Mopti in the Mopti Region of southern-central Mali. The village is 20 km north of Sévaré between the RN15 and the Niger River.

sampara village also founded in andhra pradesh east godavari dist.
