= Soufouroulaye =

- Village
- Location in Mali
- Coordinates: 14°24′21″N 4°4′58″W
- Country: Mali
- Region: Mopti Region
- Cercle: Mopti Cercle
- Commune: Sio
- Time zone: UTC+0 (GMT)

Soufouroulaye is a village and seat of the commune of Sio in the Cercle of Mopti in the Mopti Region of southern-central Mali.

The town of Soufouroulaye has both Christians and Muslims. Fulfulde is the main language spoken in Soufouroulaye. Local pronunciations of the villages name are Sofurla:y (Fulfulde) and Sófùrlá (Tomo kan).
