= Sendégué =

- Village
- Location in Mali
- Coordinates: 15°15′41″N 3°56′54″W
- Country: Mali
- Region: Mopti Region
- Cercle: Mopti Cercle
- Commune: Ouroubé Douddé
- Time zone: UTC+0 (GMT)

Sendégué is a village and seat of the commune of Ouroubé Douddé in the Cercle of Mopti in the Mopti Region of southern-central Mali.
