= Bassirou (given name) =

Bassirou is a West African masculine given name. Notable people with the given name include:

- Bassirou Badji (fl. 1980), Senegalese basketball player
- Bassirou Compaoré (born 1988), Burkinabé footballer
- Bassirou Dembélé (born 1990), Malian footballer
- Bassirou Doumbia (born 1942), Senegalese sprinter
- Bassirou Diomaye Faye (born 1980), Senegalese politician and tax inspector, 5th President of Senegal
- Bassirou Konté (born 1988), Ivorian cyclist
- Bassirou N'Diaye (born 2002), Senegalese footballer
- Bassirou Ouédraogo (born 1992), Burkinabé footballer

== See also ==
- Bassirou, a commune in Mopti Region, Mali
