= Diambacourou =

- Village
- Location in Mali
- Coordinates: 14°49′24″N 3°58′33″W
- Country: Mali
- Region: Mopti Region
- Cercle: Mopti Cercle
- Commune: Borondougou
- Time zone: UTC+0 (GMT)

Diambacourou is a village and seat of the commune of Borondougou in the Cercle of Mopti in the Mopti Region of south-central Mali.
