= Dialloubé raid =

Raid on Dialloubé
- Part of Mali War
Date	February 23, 2019
Location	Dialloubé, Mali
Result	Franco-Malian victory

Belligerents
France; Mali	Katibat Macina

Casualties and losses
None	15 killed (per France); 20 killed (per Mali)

The raid on Dialloubé took place on February 23, 2019, and was an ambush by Franco-Malian forces against Katibat Macina.

== Raid ==
On February 23, French troops from Operation Barkhane spotted a group of Katiba Macina fighters near the town of Dialloubé, in the northern Mopti region. That evening, French fighter jets and drones launched an airstrike on the Katibat Macina positions, with Malian troops then intervening and destroying two jihadist bases. French forces later stated around 15 jihadists were killed, while Malian sources claimed the deaths of 20 jihadists.
