= N'Gouréma Toboro =

- Village
- Location in Mali
- Coordinates: 14°25′18″N 4°32′54″W
- Country: Mali
- Region: Mopti Region
- Cercle: Mopti Cercle
- Commune: Sasalbé
- Time zone: UTC+0 (GMT)

N'Gouréma Toboro is a village and seat of the commune of Sasalbé in the Cercle of Mopti in the Mopti Region of southern-central Mali.
