= Soye =

Soye may refer to:

== People ==
- Jimmy Soye (born 1885), Scottish football player
- Jean-Louis Soye (1774-1832), French general (fr, no, ru)

== Places ==
- Soye, Wallonia
- Soye, Burkina Faso
- Soye, Doubs, France
- Soye, Mali
- Soye-en-Septaine, Cher, France
