= Mamadou Sinsy Coulibaly =

Malian businessman

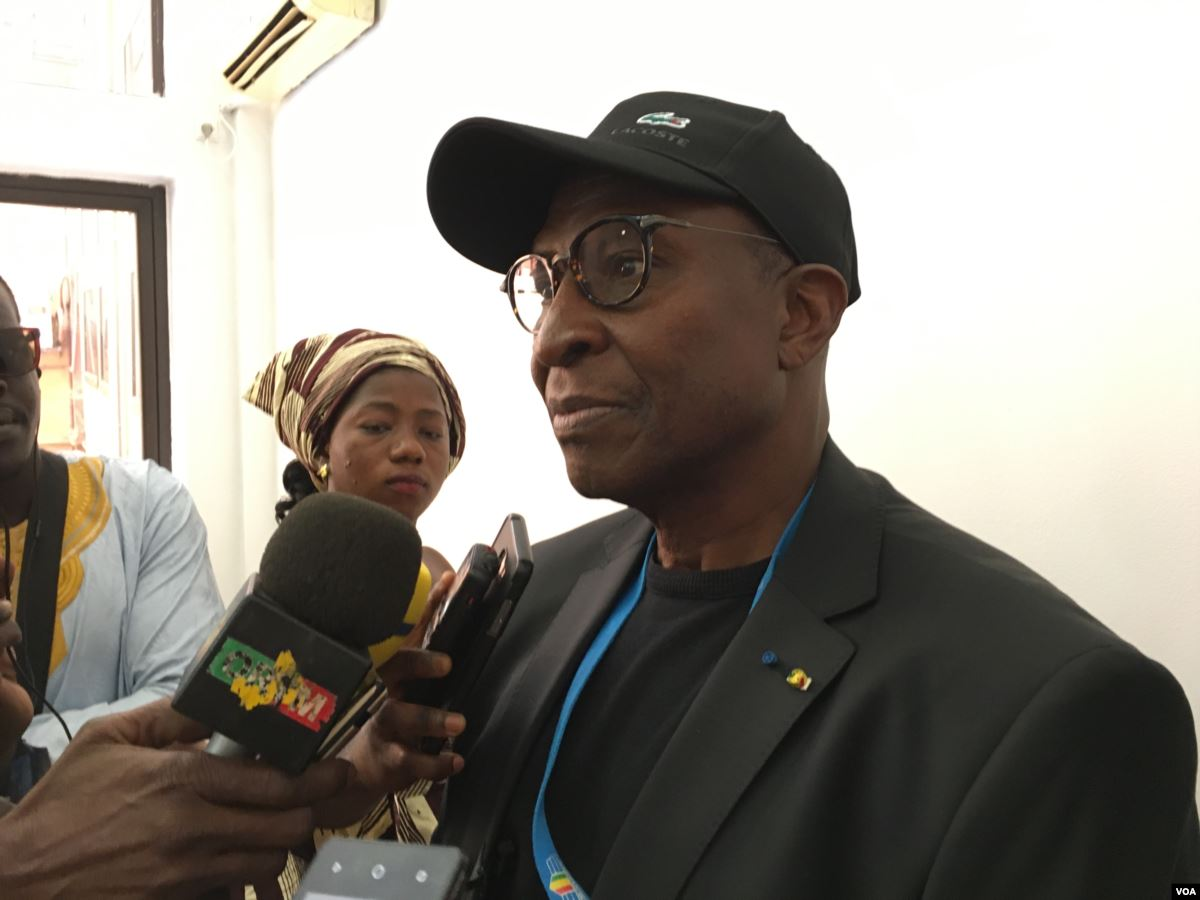
- 2019
- Born: 1956 (age 69–70); Dakar, Senegal (French West Africa)
- Education: University of Jussieu, Paris
- Occupation: Industrialist
- Years active: 1974–present
- Known for: Founder and CEO, Kledu Group

Mamadou Sinsy Coulibaly, nicknamed ‘’’Coulou’’’, is a Malian business leader. He was president of the National Council of Employers of Mali (CNPM) from 2015 to 2019 and, following a two year legal dispute, from December 2021 claimed control of the organization.

== Early life ==
Born in 1956 in Dakar then part of French West Africa, he attended school in Mopti, and Bamako Mali, and then the University of Jussieu, Paris, the Le Mans School of Automotive Commerce, before receiving an engineering degree in the Soviet Union.

== Business career ==
He began his business career forming a private security company in Paris in 1974, then moving to the United States, founding an African funeral services company, expanding to Montreal. Returning to Bamako in the 1980s, he built up a series of businesses in the used vehicle trade, and expanded into video equipment sales, from there into one of the first private media businesses in Mali.

As owner of the Kledu Group, he has diversified into many industries, beginning with media, his Radio Kledu, founded in 1992. Le Monde has called him “one of the richest and most influential men in Mali.”

Universally known by his nickname “Coulou” he has since the 1990s diversified into digital printing, media, tourism, insurance, agribusiness, catering, and shipping. The Kledu group employed over 1,800 people in 2017, and 2,000 in 2019 spanning fifty companies in Mali, the largest of which is Malivision, which had in 2017 an annual turnover of €25 million.

Other prominent firms in the group include Radio Kledu, Kledu Events, Kledu Farms, K2FM radio, the free monthly Le Dourouni newspaper, ImprimColor printing, Tam courrier shipping, Kledu press, SPI office automation, and Tam Voyages travel. “Kledu” is named for both his mother and his daughter.

== Advocacy and activism ==
Coulibaly has been an outspoken advocate against government corruption in Mali. Coulibaly was chosen by Malian business leaders to become the president of the National Council of Employers of Mali (CNPM) in October 2015, Mali's largest and most influential business advocacy group.

Following a public defamation case brought against for accusations of corruption against government officials, Coulibaly was removed as the head of the CNPM but was re-instated following a successful court battle in late 2021. He had, in March 2019, named the President of the Malian Supreme Court "the most corrupt and dangerous official in the country.” Barred from leadership by a rival faction of the CNPM, Amadou Diadié Sankaré was elected president of the organization on 26 September 2020. Lawsuits eventually ended in a Malian Supreme Court ruling that annulled Diadié's election and that Coulibaly's organizing committee was the legitimate leadership of the CNPM further legal battles left the organization's assets and elections in limbo, while Coulibaly claimed leadership.

Coulibaly has also been outspoken on Franco-Malian business relations, counting many French business leaders among his friends, and on the post-2012 security crisis in Mali.
