= Manaco =

- Village
- Location in Mali
- Coordinates: 14°39′7″N 4°4′11″W
- Country: Mali
- Region: Mopti Region
- Cercle: Mopti Cercle
- Commune: Kounari
- Time zone: UTC+0 (GMT)

Manaco is a village and seat of the commune of Kounari in the Cercle of Mopti in the Mopti Region of southern-central Mali.
