= Ouroubé Douddé =

- Commune
- Location in Mali
- Coordinates: 15°15′41″N 3°56′54″W
- Country: Mali
- Region: Mopti Region
- Cercle: Mopti Cercle

Area
  - Total: 279 km^{2} (108 sq mi)

Population (2009)
  - Total: 12,211
  - Density: 43.8/km^{2} (113/sq mi)
- Time zone: UTC+0 (GMT)

Ouroubé Douddé is a commune in the Cercle of Mopti in the Mopti Region of Mali. The commune contains nine villages and in 2009 had a population of 12,211. The main village is Sendégué.
