= Sasalbé =

- Commune
- Location in Mali
- Coordinates: 14°25′18″N 4°32′54″W
- Country: Mali
- Region: Mopti Region
- Cercle: Mopti Cercle
- Admin HQ (chef-lieu): Nogourema Toboro

Population (2009 census)
  - Total: 5,892
- Time zone: UTC+0 (GMT)

Sasalbé (or Salsalbé) is a commune in the Cercle of Mopti in the Mopti Region of Mali. The commune contains nine villages. The administrative center (chef-lieu) is the village of N'Gouréma Toboro.
