= Bassirou =

- Commune
- Location in Mali
- Coordinates: 14°42′13″N 4°2′45″W
- Country: Mali
- Region: Mopti Region
- Cercle: Mopti Cercle

Population (2009 census)
  - Total: 2,064
- Time zone: UTC+0 (GMT)

Bassirou is a commune in the Cercle of Mopti in the Mopti Region of Mali. The main village of Sampara is located 20 km north of Sévaré between the RN15 and the Niger River. In 2009 the commune had a population of 2,064.
