= Sio, Mali =

Sio
- Commune
- Location in Mali
- Coordinates: 14°24′21″N 4°4′58″W
- Country: Mali
- Region: Mopti Region
- Cercle: Mopti Cercle

Area
  - Total: 521 km^{2} (201 sq mi)

Population (2009 census)
  - Total: 23,948
  - Density: 46.0/km^{2} (119/sq mi)
- Time zone: UTC+0 (GMT)

Sio is a commune in the Cercle of Mopti in the Mopti Region of Mali.

The commune contains 19 villages and in 2009 had a population of 23,948. The main village is Soufouroulaye.
