= Socoura =

- Commune and town
- Location in Mali
- Coordinates: 14°32′50″N 4°5′22″W
- Country: Mali
- Region: Mopti Region
- Cercle: Mopti Cercle

Population (2009 census)
  - Total: 42,553
- Time zone: UTC+0 (GMT)

Socoura is a village and rural commune in the Cercle of Mopti in the Mopti Region of Mali. The commune contains 28 small villages and in 2009 had a population of 36,983. The commune entirely surrounds the urban commune of Mopti, is situated at an elevation of 275 meters, and covers an area of 727 square kilometers.

== Climate and Agriculture ==
The commune's climate is arid, with a rainy season from July to September and a dry season from October to June. Annual rainfall averages between 350 and 400 mm. The soils are predominantly sandy and sandy-loamy, especially in the eastern and southern parts.

The commune is geographically divided into two zones: 14 villages in flooded areas and 14 in non-flooded areas.

Agriculture is a primary activity, with dryland crops such as millet, sorghum, peanuts, cowpeas, and maize grown in non-flooded areas, and rice cultivated in flooded areas. Livestock rearing and traditional fishing are also practiced.

== Administration ==
The commune's administrative structure includes a communal council of 23 members, with representation from four political parties and independents. The council is supported by various commissions focusing on finance, civil status, environment, education, and health. Collaborating institutions include local government authorities, technical services in health, education, agriculture, livestock, nature conservation, hydraulics, and various NGOs and development projects.

== Infrastructure and Communication ==
Socoura is well-connected by road to Mopti, Bamako, and Gao, with major national roads running through the commune (RN5, RN15, RN16). However, rural roads become impassable during the rainy season, limiting mobility and access to services. Communication is facilitated by local radio stations and mobile phone networks, with coverage from Sotelma and IKATEL.

== Demographics ==
At the time of the 1998 census, the population of Socoura was 24,254. In the 2009 census, the population was recorded as 36,983. This reflects an annual population growth rate of 3.9% between 1998 and 2009. The population density in 2009 was 50.87 inhabitants per square kilometer.

In 2009, the population included 18,803 males (49.2%) and 18,180 females (50.8%).

Socoura is home to various ethnic groups, including Peulh, Diawandos, Rimaibés, Bozos, Markas, and Bambara.

== Social Services ==
SOS Children's Villages Mali operates in Socoura to provide care for children without parental support. The organization provides alternative family-based care for children who cannot live with their biological families. It also offers support to families in difficult situations, including parenting workshops, training on child rights, job skills training, and access to education and healthcare.

The organization works to reunite children with their families when possible and supports their reintegration. For young people leaving care, SOS Children's Villages offers training and planning to prepare them for independent living and employment.
