= Kounari =

- Commune
- Location in Mali
- Coordinates: 14°39′7″N 4°4′11″W
- Country: Mali
- Region: Mopti Region
- Cercle: Mopti Cercle

Area
  - Total: 600 km^{2} (230 sq mi)

Population (2009)
  - Total: 5,632
  - Density: 9.4/km^{2} (24/sq mi)
- Time zone: UTC+0 (GMT)

Kounari is a commune in the Cercle of Mopti in the Mopti Region of Mali. The principal village is Manaco. The commune contains 32 small villages and in 2009 had a population of 5,632, a much smaller number than the 12,654 recorded in 1998.
