= Haroun Ag Said =

- Nickname(s): Abou Jemal
- Died: April 29, 2014; Borisa, Kidal Region, Mali
- Allegiance: Mali (1997-2006); ADC (2006); Ansar Dine (2012-2014)
- Rank: Lieutenant-colonel (Mali); Emir (Ansar Dine)
- Battles / wars: Tuareg rebellion (1990-1996); Tuareg rebellion (2006); Mali War: Battle of Diabaly

Haroun Ag Said, nom de guerre Abou Jamal, was a Malian Tuareg rebel and commander, and a close confidant of Iyad Ag Ghaly.

== Biography ==
Little is known about Said's early life. Said took part in the Tuareg rebellion of the 1990s, where he was seriously injured in the throat. Following the peace agreements that concluded the rebellion, he joined the Malian Army. He served for seven years as a second lieutenant in the Léré garrison and was company commander in Diabaly for a time. During this time, he rose to the rank of lieutenant colonel.

Said deserted from the army in 2006 to join the May 23, 2006 Democratic Alliance for Change (ADC) and fought under Iyad Ag Ghaly. He disarmed following the Algiers Accords. In May 2008, he led fifty men in an attack on the garrison in Diabaly, killing one Malian soldier. He rejoined Iyad Ag Ghaly in Ansar Dine when the Mali War broke out in 2012, and was said to be his right-hand man and a senior figure in the movement. In January 2013, he commanded jihadist forces at the Battle of Diabaly. While he captured the city, he was forced to flee due to French intervention.

Said was killed on April 29, 2014, by French special forces in Borisa, Kidal Region. According to MINUSMA, he and two other fighters were killed in a vehicle. A French army spokesman, without naming Said, stated a militant "died with weapons in his hands", and claimed two other combatants surrendered to French forces.
