= Koubaye =

- Commune and village
- Location in Mali
- Coordinates: 14°24′59″N 4°25′48″W
- Country: Mali
- Region: Mopti Region
- Cercle: Mopti Cercle

Population (2009 census)
  - Total: 6,516
- Time zone: UTC+0 (GMT)

Koubaye is a village and commune in the Cercle of Mopti in the Mopti Region of Mali. The commune contains 8 villages and in 2009 had a population of 6,516.
