= Korientzé =

- Village
- Location in Mali
- Coordinates: 15°23′39″N 3°47′00″W
- Country: Mali
- Region: Mopti Region
- Cercle: Mopti Cercle
- Commune: Korombana
- Time zone: UTC+0 (GMT)

Korientzé is a village and seat of the commune of Korombana in the Cercle of Mopti in the Mopti Region of southern-central Mali.
