= Ouro Modi =

- Commune and village
- Location in Mali
- Coordinates: 14°16′47″N 4°35′57″W
- Country: Mali
- Region: Mopti Region
- Cercle: Mopti Cercle

Population (2009 census)
  - Total: 3,256
- Time zone: UTC+0 (GMT)

Ouro Modi is a rural commune and village in the Cercle of Mopti in the Mopti Region of Mali.
