= St. Joseph Cathedral, Mopti =

St. Joseph Cathedral
- Cathédrale Saint-Joseph
- St. Joseph Cathedral
- Location: Mopti
- Country: Mali
- Denomination: Roman Catholic Church

The St. Joseph Cathedral (French: Cathédrale Saint-Joseph) is a religious building belonging to the Catholic Church and is located in Mopti in the fifth administrative region of Mopti in central African country of Mali. The cathedral is located near Independence Avenue and Kanaga and Le Fleuve hotels. It was established in 1953 as the Parish of St. Joseph.

It is a temple that follows the Roman or Latin rite and serves as the seat of the diocese of Mopti (Dioecesis Moptiensis or Diocèse de Mopti) which was created in 1964 by bula More institutoque of Pope Paul VI.

It is under the pastoral responsibility of the Bishop Georges Fonghoro.

== See also ==
- Roman Catholicism in Mali
- St. Joseph Cathedral (disambiguation)
