= Battle of Diabaly =

2013 battle in Mali

Coordinates: 14.6833°N 6.0167°W

- Part of Northern Mali conflict
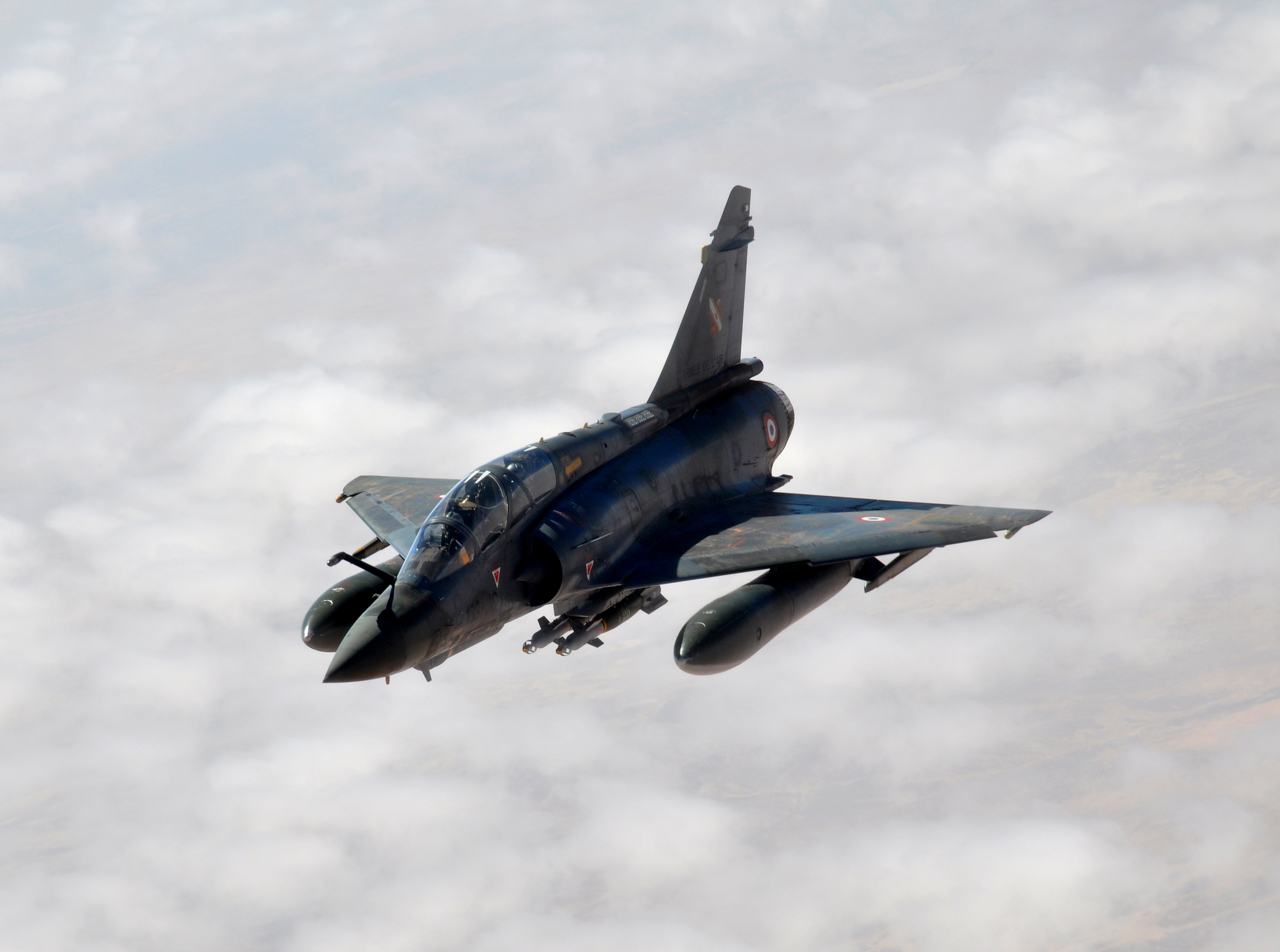
- Mirage 2000D 133-JC operation Serval
| Date | 14–21 January 2013 (1 week) |
| Location | Diabaly, Mali |
| Status | Malian/French military victory; Islamist propaganda victory: Islamists capture Diabaly and hold it for a week; Malian and French army retake Diabaly |

Belligerents
| Islamists groups: Ansar Dine; MOJWA; AQIM; Boko Haram | Mali; Malian Army; France; French Army; French Air and Space Force |

Commanders and leaders
| Abou Zeïd; Ousmane Haïdara Haroune Ag Saïd | (Mali) Seydou Sogoba |

Strength
| 250–300 fighters, 60 vehicles | (Mali) 500–700 soldiers (France) 100 soldiers 6 Mirage 2000D; 4+ Rafale; 10 Gazelle helicopters |

Casualties and losses
| 47 killed | (Mali) ~12 killed |
- 4+ civilians killed

The Battle of Diabaly was fought between government forces of Mali, against groups of Islamists militants such as the AQIM and Ansar Dine. The Islamists held control of Diabaly for no longer than a week until Malian forces with the help French air strikes recaptured the town.

== Background ==
On 13 January, the French Air Force bombarded major Islamist towns throughout northern Mali. As a result of this hundreds of Islamists fled to the Mauritania border, where they launched a counterattack on the western town of Diabaly.

== Order of battle ==
The jihadist offensive on Diabaly was launched parallel with that of Battle of Konna. Unlike Konna, where the attackers led the attack in small, scattered groups, the Islamists headed for Diabaly in pick-up columns. Their forces consisted of contingents from all jihadist groups present in Mali: Ansar Dine, MUJAO, AQIM and even some men of Boko Haram. The Malian army was disposed in the place of a military camp and a garrison of 400 men commanded by Colonel Sogoba. On the first day of the fight, a helicopter was also sent urgently to Diabaly. The number of jihadists engaged in battle is not known exactly. According to Jean-Paul Mari, reporter for Le Nouvel Observateur, the Islamist forces launched the assault on Diabaly with 400 men and 47 pick-ups. Among them were Arabs, Tuaregs, Bambara, Bellas and French-speaking and English-speaking blacks. On January 15, French Defense Minister Jean-Yves Le Drian declared that the Islamist forces deployed in this area were among the "hardest, most fanatic, the best organized, the most determined and the best armed groups. " He estimated the number of fighters " to several hundred, more than a thousand - 1,200, 1,300 - [...] with perhaps reinforcements tomorrow ". Refugee in Bamako, the mayor of Diabaly sayd on January 17 that about 2,000 Islamists occupyed Diabaly. The prefect of the circle of Niono, Seydou Traoré, number of his next to 100 the number of jihadist vehicles shortly before the end of the battle. Abu Zeid, the leader of al-Qaeda's Katiba Tarik Ibn Ziyad in the Islamic Maghreb, led the assault on the city. According to Jean-Paul Mari, the jihadist commander in Diabaly is Ousmane Haïdara, a former Malian army officer who commanded the Diabaly garrison from 2007 to 2009 and knows the terrain well. Le Monde's reporter, Jean-Philippe Remy, also mentions "a certain commander Ousmane", a former Tuareg rebel who fights for Ansar Dine.

== Diabaly is taken over by the Islamists ==
After meeting at the beginning of January in Bambara Maoudé, the jihadists of Ansar Dine, MUJAO, AQIM and Boko Haram go on the offensive in southern Mali. One group attacks the city of Konna, while another, divided into two or three columns, bypasses the positions of the Malian army via Mauritania, in order to attack Diabaly. The Malians are warned by the French of the imminence of the attack, and the commander of the garrison then divides his forces into three groups to hold the villages on the roads leading to Diabaly. 200 Troops also defend the military camp, actually very weakly fortified, located inside the city. While their planes monitor the progress of the Islamists, the French send on January 13 two Caracal helicopters to Diabaly. They file special forces soldiers to guide the air strikes and a medical team. COS advises Malians to keep the two bridges over the canal to the west and south-west of the city. On the evening of January 13, the jihadists were on the outskirts of Diabaly were they camped for the night. The next day, after praying, they go on the attack at six in the morning. Their first attempt was postponed, but they returned to the assault at 7:45 am 5 . The jihadists approach the city from the south, destroy an armored vehicle, then run west along the canal, they seize the military posts that defend the bridges, cross the canal, then enter the city. Mirage hunters, slowed down by the technical problem of a tanker, arrive too late to a few minutes. Once inside Diabaly, the jihadists are divided into two groups. One goes towards the big public square and the military camp, the other towards the Malian positions to the east of the city. The Malian defenses crack completely and the soldiers disband. The French, also posted to the east, regain their Caracal speed and retreat. At 9 am, after less than three hours of fighting, the jihadists have captured the city. Preparations for the battle started a few days after the French intervention began when Islamists sent reinforcements to the border town of Goma where from there instead of waiting for Malian troops to move into rebel-controlled territory, the Islamists decided to move south. At the edge of Diabaly, rebels deserted their trucks, leaving the road leading from Goma to Diabaly where Malian forces were awaiting the attack, and walked by foot south to the village of Kourouma and then to Alatola. Malian forces tried to block the rebels at Alatola but were defeated in a minor skirmish and pushed back to their base in Diabaly. Around 70 vehicles full of insurgents participated in the attack and another 50 arrived later. It's unclear what exactly happened to the soldiers based in Diabaly, but a prominent jihadists leader, Oumar Ould Hamaha said that "there are many dead, and others fled on foot". A dozen soldiers were killed in the initial fighting. After the army abandoned the Diabaly military base, armed gunmen went door-to-door searching for hidden soldiers or civilians linked in some way to the army. At least five soldiers were executed along with one civilian, in what jihadists leader Abou Zeid refers to as retribution for the massacre of 17 Islamists preachers committed by Malian soldiers stationed in Daibaly. According to another report, three heads of households were executed. On the nights of 14–15 January, French Rafale, Mirage F1 CR, and Mirage 2000D fighter jets continuously bombarded dozens of rebel vehicles near Diabaly, at least five jihadists were killed and many more were wounded. Residents said the jihadists began staying in groups of 20 or so trucks, parking discreetly under trees to avoid French aerial bombardment. On 16 January, French fighter jets and helicopters continued striking targeted objectives while dozens of soldiers were deployed to the Diabaly area. The same day the French army was said to have engaged its ground forces in combat for the first time since the intervention began, however the French ministry of defense said the statement was not accurate.

== Islamists retreat ==
On 17 January, a convoy of 50 armoured vehicles left Bamako overnight. Residents of Niono, 70 km south of Diabaly, said the French arrived overnight. A Malian security source told AFP that French special forces were fighting together "hand-to-hand" against the Islamists in Diabaly. A resident in Diabaly reported to have counted the bodies of at least three dead Malian soldiers lying on the side of the road and that the Islamists buried their dead next to the village cemetery. The mayor of Diabaly, Oumar Diakite reported to BBC news that there weren't any French ground forces near Diabaly, and only Malian forces were involved in the fighting. He also stated that the only French presence nearby, were those stationed in the town of Niono, co-ordinating with the Malian army. On 18 January the Islamists reportedly fled dressed as civilians and abandoned dozens of heavy weapons and caches of guns and ammunition inside several residents homes. On 21 January, Malian and French forces entered the town without resistance. Malian troops found that there military base lied ruins, looted by rebels and heavily damaged by French aerial bombardment, as the base served as the contemporary jihadists headquarters during the week-long occupation.
