= Borondougou =

- Commune
- Location in Mali
- Coordinates: 14°49′24″N 3°58′33″W
- Country: Mali
- Region: Mopti Region
- Cercle: Mopti Cercle

Population (2009 census)
  - Total: 9,056
- Time zone: UTC+0 (GMT)

Borondougou is a commune in the Cercle of Mopti in the Mopti Region of Mali. The main village is Diambacourou. In 2009 the commune had a population of 9,056.
