= Fatoma =

- Commune and village
- Location in Mali
- Coordinates: 14°36′44″N 4°3′41″W
- Country: Mali
- Region: Mopti Region
- Cercle: Mopti Cercle

Population (2009 census)
  - Total: 24,595
- Time zone: UTC+0 (GMT)

Fatoma is a village and commune in the Cercle of Mopti in the Mopti Region of Mali. The commune contains 24 villages and in 2009 had a population of 24,595. The village of Fatoma lies 10 kilometres north of Sévaré.

== History ==
Fatoma was the capital of the 18th century kingdom of Kunaari.
