= Konna =

- Commune and town
- Location in Mali
- Coordinates: 14°56′48″N 3°53′36″W
- Country: Mali
- Region: Mopti Region
- Cercle: Mopti Cercle

Area
  - Total: 838 km^{2} (324 sq mi)
- Elevation: 268 m (879 ft)

Population (2009 census)
  - Total: 36,767
  - Density: 43.9/km^{2} (114/sq mi)
- Time zone: UTC+0 (GMT)

Konna is a town and rural commune in the Cercle of Mopti in the Mopti Region of Mali. The town lies 60 km northeast of Mopti on the eastern edge of the flood plain of the Niger River. The main RN16 highway linking Sévaré and Gao branches to the east just to the south of the town. The commune has an area of approximately 838 km^{2} and contains the town and 24 of the surrounding villages. In the 2009 census, it had a population of 36,767.

A weekly market is held in the town on Thursdays that attracts many people from the surrounding settlements.

Konna has mix of Fulbe, Fulbe-Rimaibe, and Marka peoples, and also some Dogon and Songhay people.

== Mali War ==
In January 2013, Konna was captured by Islamists. The attack triggered French intervention in the war, and with their aid the Malian government forces swiftly launched a counterattack to retake the town. It was initially claimed by the Malian government that it had been successful in recapturing the town. However, it was later denied by French military officials that the town had been retaken. Fighting continued and the town was confirmed to be under Malian government control three days later.
