= Grand Mosque of Mopti =

Mosque in Mopti, Mali

- Grande Mosquée de Mopti
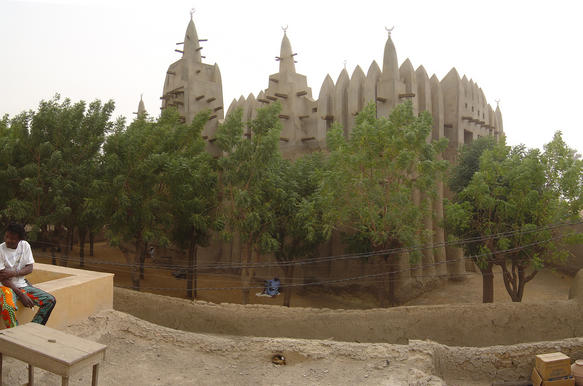

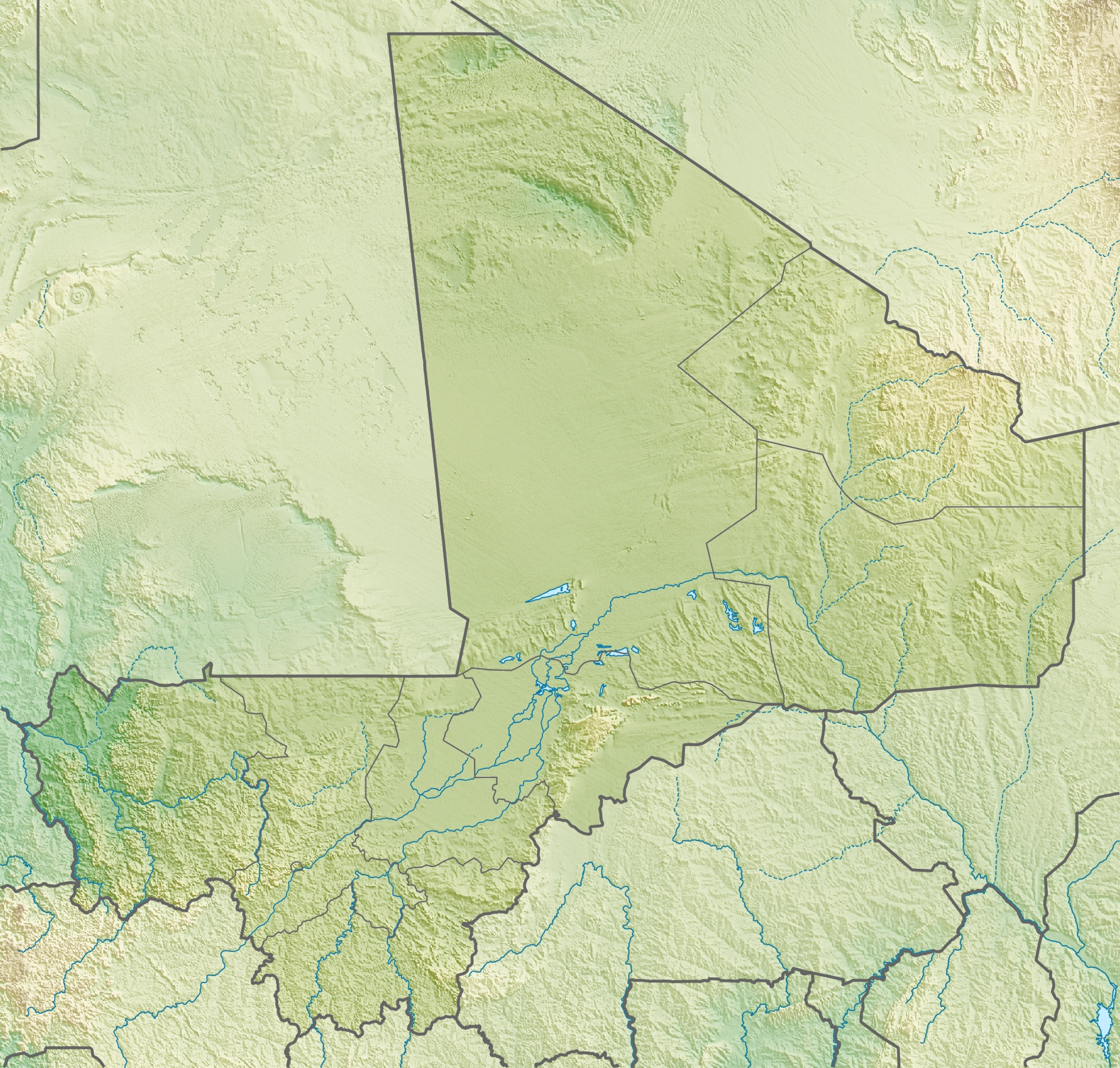
- Location within Mali

Religion
- Affiliation: Islam
- Branch/tradition: Sunni

Location
- Location: Mopti, Mali
- Interactive map of Grand Mosque of Mopti
- Coordinates: 14°29′38″N 4°11′48″W

Architecture
- Type: mosque
- Groundbreaking: 1908

The Grand Mosque of Mopti (French: Grande Mosquée de Mopti), also known as Komoguel Mosque, is a mosque located in the city of Mopti, in the Mopti Region of Mali.

== Architecture ==
=== Introduction ===
The term "Sudanese" emerged in the early 20th century post the French conquest of Western Sudan, referring to West African regions including Mauritania, Mali, Burkina Faso, the north of the Ivory Coast, and Ghana, popularized through French media and colonial exhibitions. These mosques, found in aforesaid countries are tied to trans-Saharan trade and typically feature mud brick construction with decorative elements like toron, buttresses, and pinnacles. Known as "mosques of the Niger valleys," these structures showcase diverse architectural styles influenced by Sub-Saharan history, political expansions, and Islam's spread through commercial networks.

In contrast to East African mosques, West African mosque construction techniques are well-documented due to their continued use during the colonial period. Specialists or collective village efforts, often directed by experienced masons, were involved in construction, with inclusive participation reflecting traditional gender roles. These mosques, predominantly found in the Niger valleys, feature earthen construction with wooden reinforcements and are commonly located centrally within towns or villages.

=== The mosque ===
Mopti, located at the junction of the Niger and Bani rivers, was originally a small Bozo settlement until the late nineteenth century. In 1905, it came under French colonial administration and has since transformed into a bustling commercial hub connected with Bamako. The Friday mosque, situated in the Komoguel district, dates back to 1933–35, undergoing restoration in 1980. The restoration involved adding baked bricks to the towers' points and corner pillars, with cement applied to the upper quarter of the facades. The mosque spans 530 m^{2} and reaches heights of 17 m for the mihrab tower and 13.5 m for the lateral towers. Instead of a courtyard, the mosque is enclosed entirely, with a spacious area before the eastern facade, facing the mihrab tower.

The symmetrical facades feature corner pillars and buttresses with elongated points, while the north and south entrances boast Djennian portals. The prayer hall comprises four bays parallel to the qibla, each formed by rows of seven pillars measuring 1 m on each side. The square mihrab measures 2 m on each side, contrasting with the narrow 70 cm-wide minbar. Decorative elements adorn the mihrab tower, including nine rows of toron, square blind niches, and corner battlements. Similarly, the corner towers feature five rows of torons.

The mosque's western wall mirrors the tripartite arrangement of the eastern facade, characterized by a central massive tower flanked by smaller corner towers. This symmetrical design, attributed to French colonial influence, deviates from the vernacular style of the Niger valleys. The towers are topped with trapezoidal spires tapering towards the summit, capped by ceramic caps adorned with two ostrich eggs.

== World Heritage status ==
This site was added to the UNESCO World Heritage Tentative List on March 19, 2009, in the Cultural category.
