= National Council of Employers of Mali =

The National Council of Employers of Mali (French, Conseil national du patronat du Mali, CNPM) is the national representative body of businesses and employers in the Republic of Mali. It was founded in 1980 as a government initiative to create a single representative body of private sector employers, answerable to the Minister of Labor and the Public Service.

Its original name, the "Fédération Nationale des Employeurs de Mali (FNEM)" was changed in 2003.

The organization is made up of over forty professional organizations and employers councils in each Region of Mali, which are represented at the national level. The membership is made up of business owners and leaders, not businesses.

== Leadership controversies ==
From 2019 to 2022, the presidency of the CNPM was contested in a series of high-profile legal battles, between its 2015 president, Mamadou Sinsy Coulibaly and Diadié Sankaré, chosen by a rival leadership body in September 2020. Legal battles eventually ended in a Malian Supreme Court ruling that annulled Diadié's election and that Coulibaly's organizing committee was the legitimate leadership of the CNPM further suits left the organization's assets, including its offices in and elections in limbo, while Coulibaly claimed leadership. The involvement of Coulibaly in activism against corruption was claimed by CNPM Vice-president Boubacar Diallo to be the cause of the split in the organization.
