= L'Esprit de Mopti =

- Directed by: Moussa Ouane
- Screenplay by: Moussa Ouane, Pascal Letellier
- Produced by: Dominant 7, RVP Sud
- Cinematography: Jacques Besse
- Edited by: Carole Equer-Harmy
- Release date: 1999
- Running time: 45 minutes
- Countries: France; Mali
- Language: a

L'Esprit de Mopti (English: spirit of Mopti) is a 1999 documentary film about the city of Mopti, Mali, directed by Moussa Ouane.

== Synopsis ==
In central Mali, where desert and savannah meet, lies Mopti, a major Muslim city and commercial junction on the Niger River. Every Thursday, merchants from different ethnic groups meet at the market. All the languages spoken in Mali are used in Mopti where bartering reigns according to ancient tradition. This is the "spirit of Mopti", made up of tolerance, humour, respect for the other, exchange and trade. This documentary describes this spirit through five representative characters: a Dogon, a Bozo, a Fulani herder, a Tuareg stockbreeder, and a Bella son of the city and carter.

== Awards ==
- 2000 Golden Dhow Award in the documentary video category at the Festival of the Dhow Countries (Zanzibar International Film Festival).
- Vues d’Afrique Montréal 2000
- FESPACO 2001
