= Soye, Mali =

Soye
- Commune and village
- Location in Mali
- Coordinates: 14°13′50″N 4°16′45″W
- Country: Mali
- Region: Mopti Region
- Cercle: Mopti Cercle

Population (2009 census)
  - Total: 20,684
- Time zone: UTC+0 (GMT)

Soye (Sɔ̂y) is a village and commune in the Cercle of Mopti in the Mopti Region of Mali. The commune contains 23 villages and in 2009 had a population of 20,684.

Jamsay Dogon is spoken in Soye. Local surnames include Doumbo.
