= Korombana =

- Commune
- Location in Mali
- Coordinates: 15°23′39″N 3°47′00″W
- Country: Mali
- Region: Mopti Region
- Cercle: Mopti Cercle
- Admin centre (chef-lieu): Korientzé

Area
  - Total: 981 km^{2} (379 sq mi)

Population (2009 census)
  - Total: 29,559
  - Density: 30.1/km^{2} (78.0/sq mi)
- Time zone: UTC+0 (GMT)

Korombana is a commune in the Cercle of Mopti in the Mopti Region of Mali. It is the most northerly commune in the cercle. The commune contains 32 villages and in 2009 had a population of 29,559. The main village (chef-lieu) is Korientzé.
