= Dialloubé =

- Commune and town
- Location in Mali
- Coordinates: 15°1′2″N 4°13′57″W
- Country: Mali
- Region: Mopti Region
- Cercle: Mopti Cercle

Area
  - Total: 1,425 km^{2} (550 sq mi)

Population (2009 census)
  - Total: 31,483
  - Density: 22.09/km^{2} (57.22/sq mi)
- Time zone: UTC+0 (GMT)

Dialloubé is a small town and rural commune in the Cercle of Mopti in the Mopti Region of Mali. The commune covers an area of approximately 1,425 square kilometers and includes the town and 8 villages. In the 2009 census the commune had a population of 13,727.
