= Kunaari =

Kunaari was an 18th-century kingdom in what is now central Mali. It merged into the Massina Empire in the early 19th century. Fatoma was the capital of Kunaari.
