= Sidi Alassane Touré =

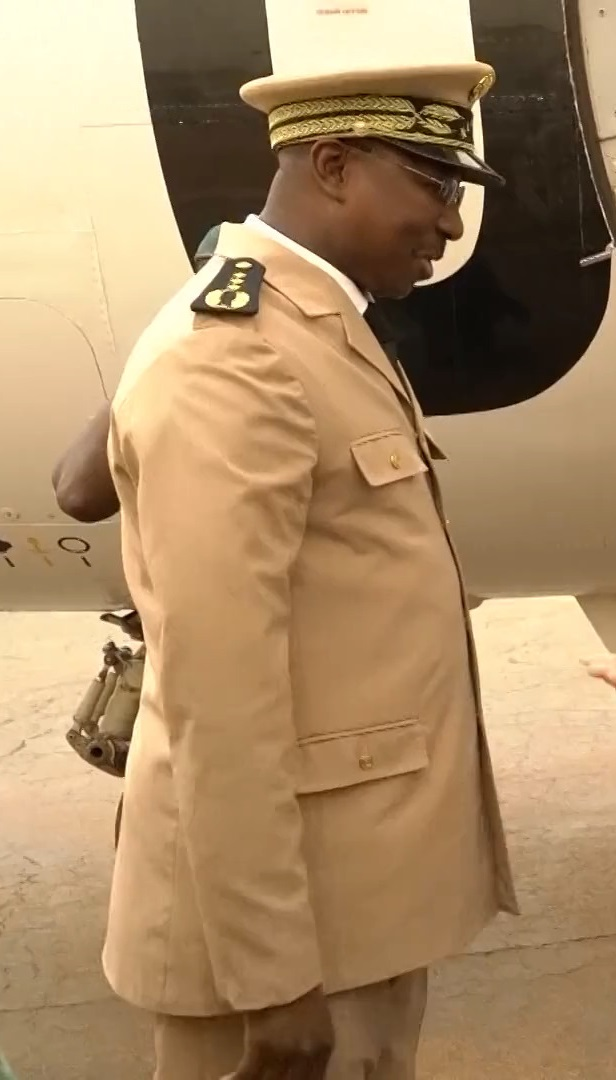
- Touré in 2018

Governor of Mopti Region
- In office 2017 – June 13, 2019

Personal details
- Born: June 26, 1970 (age 56) Niafunké, Mali
- Education: Koulikoro Joint Military School; United States Army Command and General Staff College

Military service
- Branch/service: Malian Army
- Rank: Major general

Sidi Alassane Touré is a Malian general who served as the governor of Mopti Region from 2017 to 2019.

== Biography ==
Touré was born on June 26, 1970, in Niafunké, Mali. Between 1993 and 1996, he received training at the Joint Military School in Koulikoro, and in 1998 received intelligence training in Egypt. Between 1999 and 2000, Touré attended the United States Army Command and General Staff College studying the use of armored vehicles. During his time in Koulikoro, Touré served as the commander of the 133rd Reconnaissance Squadron based in Gao, and then received many intelligence-related responsibilities in the Malian Army. After the 2012 Malian coup d'état, Touré was appointed head of internal state security as a lieutenant colonel. In the wake of the coup, he was promoted to colonel in 2012 and brigadier general in 2013 by IBK. Moussa Dawara succeeded Touré as head of state security.

In 2014, Touré was arrested for his role in crushing the 2012 Malian counter-coup attempt and a mutiny on September 30, 2013. He was acquitted for these charges in 2016. In 2017, Touré was appointed as governor of Mopti Region, and promoted to major-general on September 20, 2018. Following the Sobane Da massacre on June 13, 2019, Touré was dismissed from his post as governor. He was appointed instead as Deputy Permanent Secretary of the Malian National Security Council.
