= Sévaré =

- Town
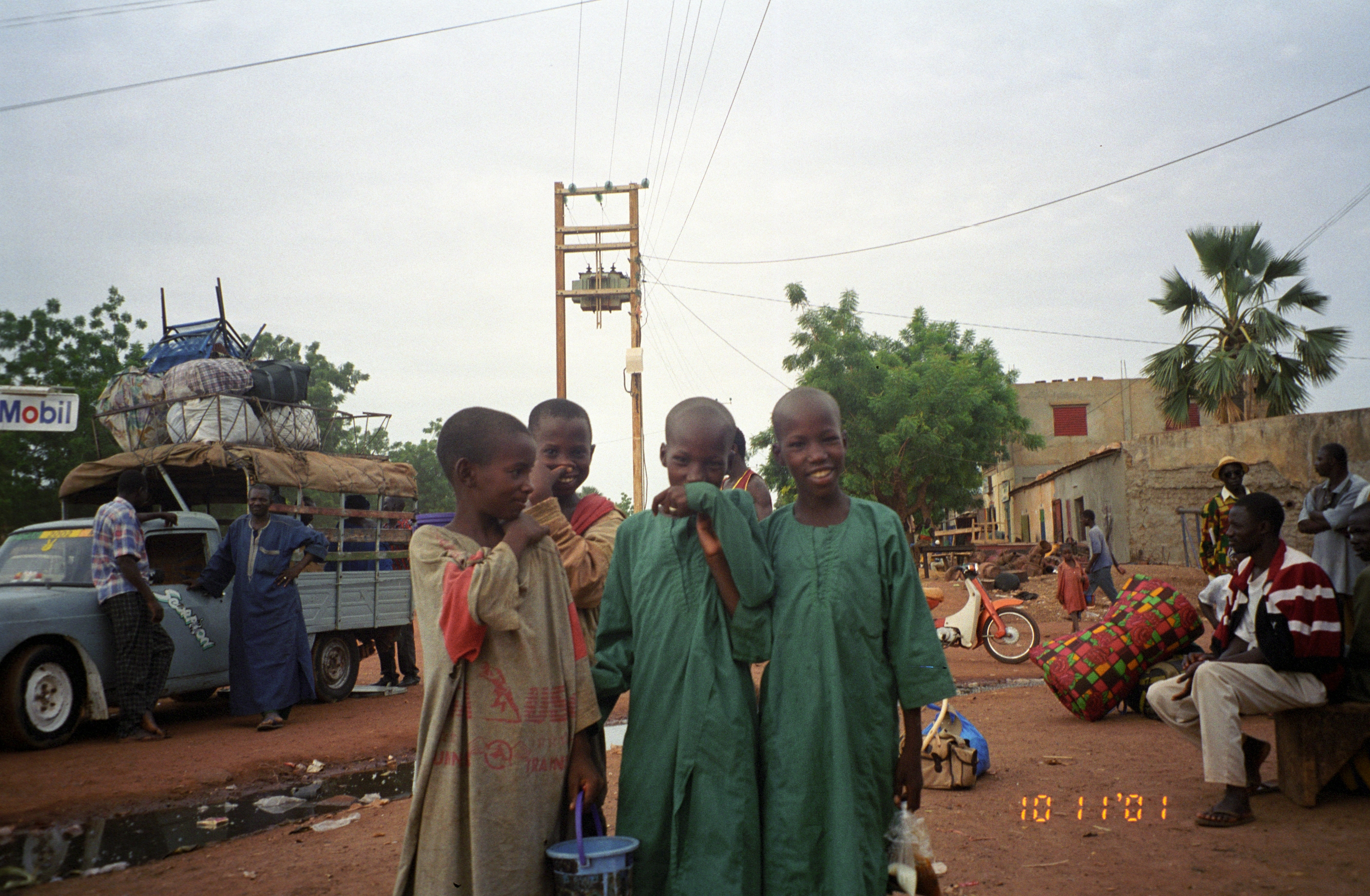
- Children of Sévaré

- Location in Mali
- Coordinates: 14°32′N 4°06′W
- Country: Mali
- Region: Mopti Region
- Cercle: Mopti Cercle
- Commune: Mopti
- Time zone: UTC+0 (GMT)

Sévaré (or Sevare) is a town in central Mali. Located in the Mopti Region, it serves as a crossroads town of about 40,000 situated about 10 kilometres (6.2 mi) southeast of Mopti and 10 km (6.2 mi) south of Fatoma, the old capital of Kunaari. From Sévaré one can access Bandiagara to the east, Gao and Timbuktu to the north, Segou and Bamako to the southwest and Burkina Faso to the south.

Mopti Airport is near Sévaré, which lies within the boundaries of Mopti Commune.

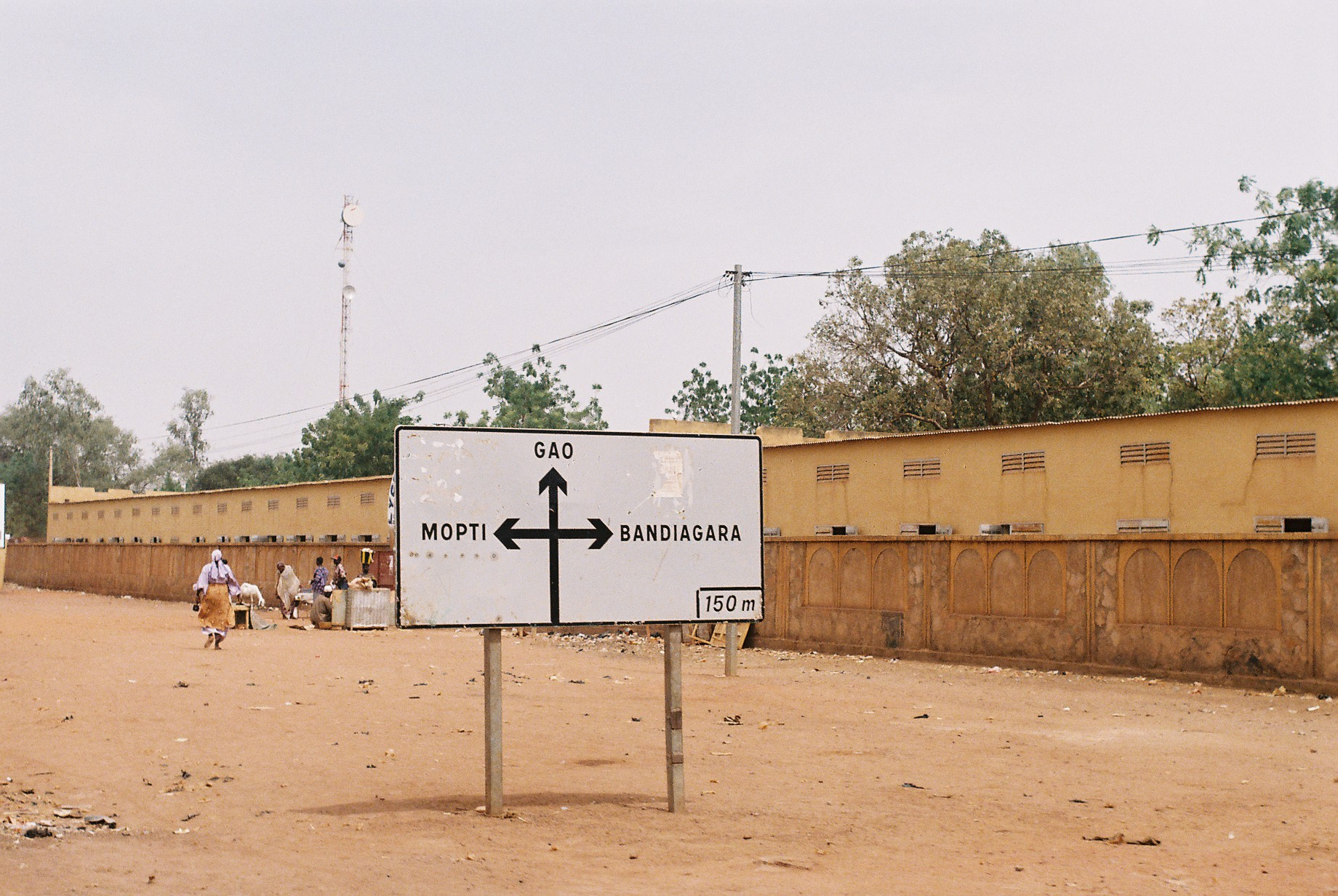

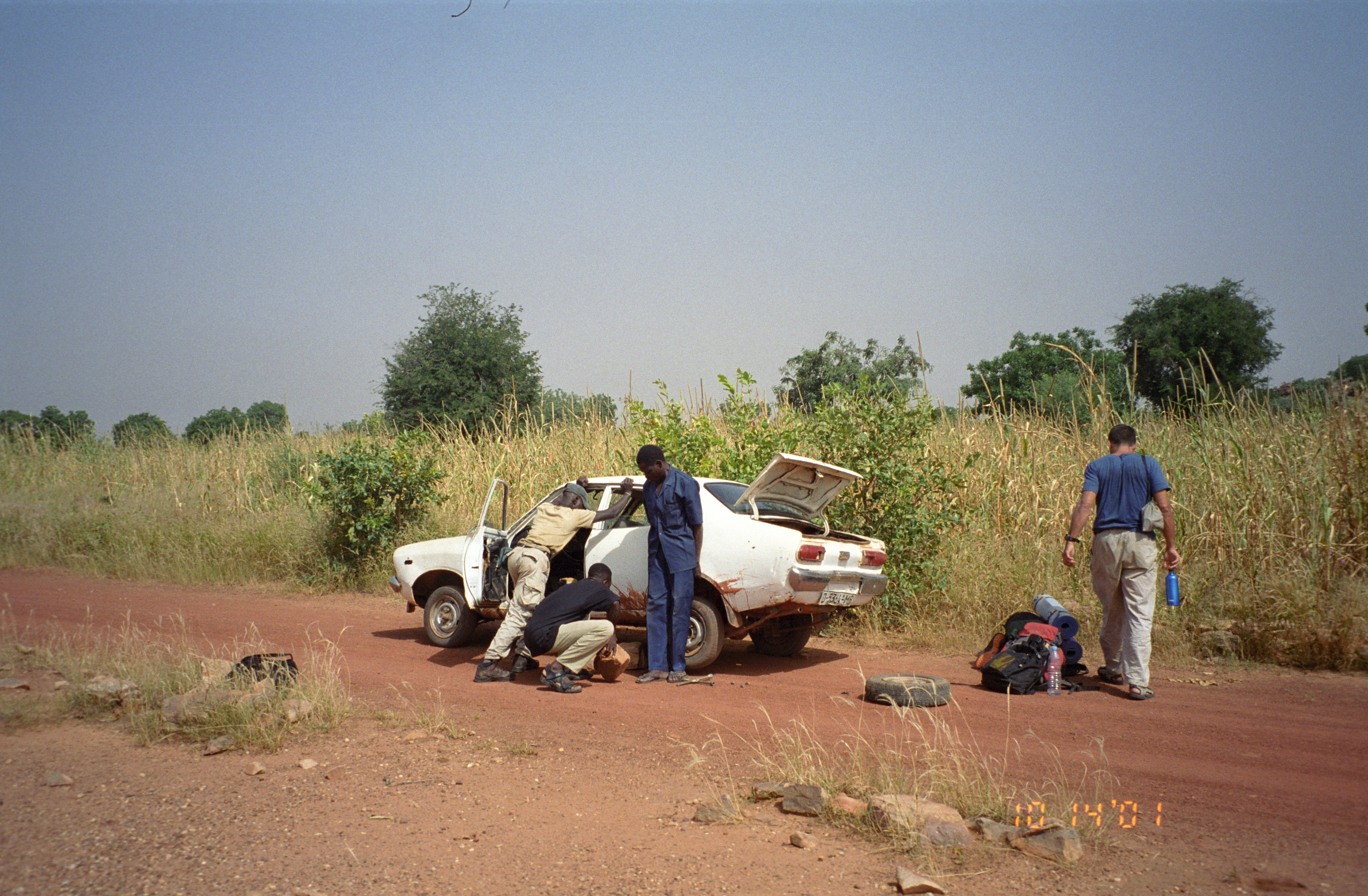

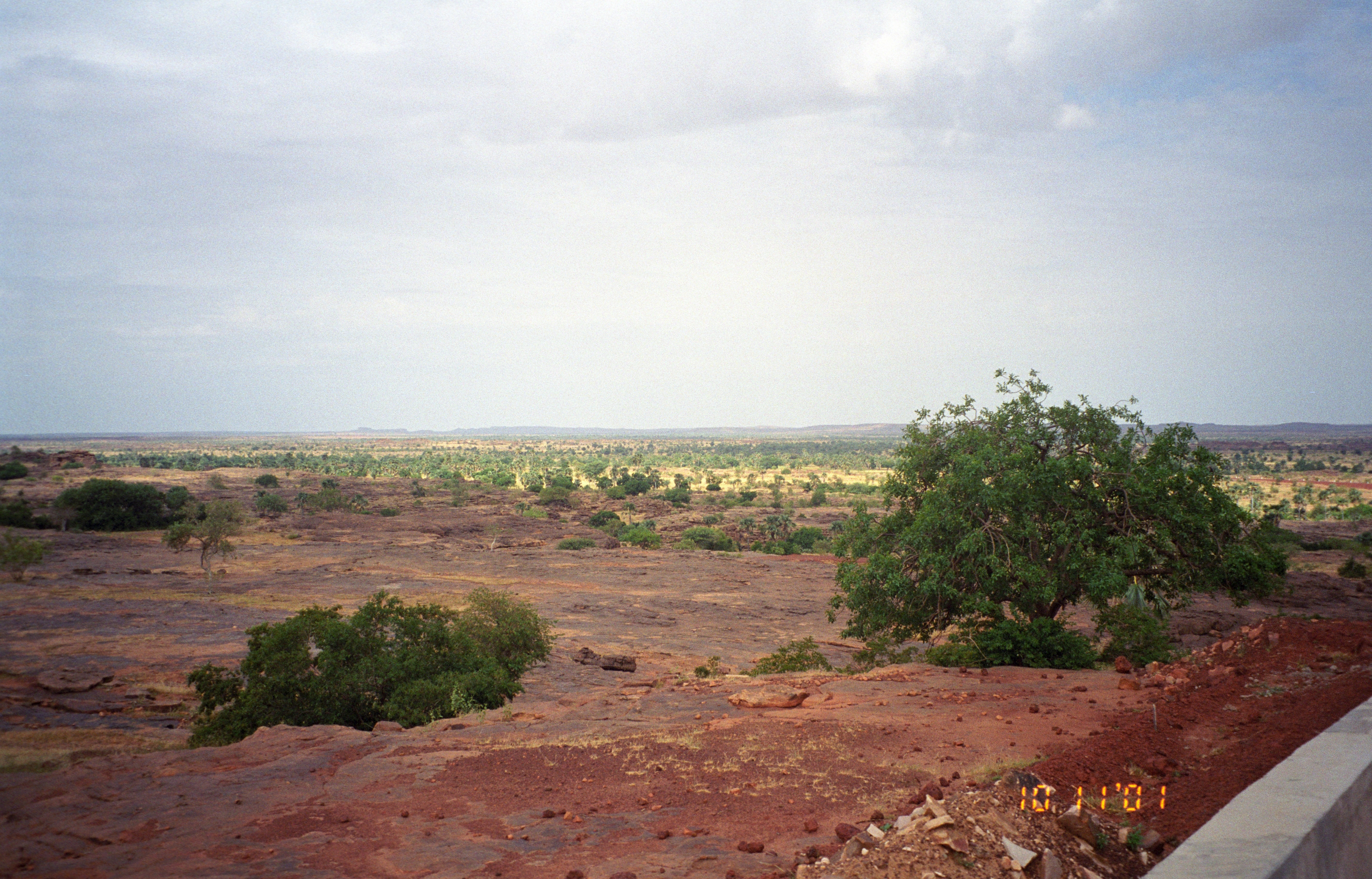

Said to have been founded by a Fula hunter, Se Waware, its importance began to grow with the construction of roads and the dike to Mopti under French colonial rule.

== Climate ==
Climate data for Ambodedjo climate station (276m elevation) 1991–2020 averages
Month	Jan	Feb	Mar	Apr	May	Jun	Jul	Aug	Sep	Oct	Nov	Dec	Year
Mean daily maximum °C (°F)	32.0 (89.6)	35.3 (95.5)	38.5 (101.3)	41.0 (105.8)	41.2 (106.2)	38.9 (102.0)	35.4 (95.7)	32.9 (91.2)	34.0 (93.2)	36.4 (97.5)	36.1 (97.0)	33.1 (91.6)	36.2 (97.2)
Mean daily minimum °C (°F)	16.4 (61.5)	19.4 (66.9)	23.0 (73.4)	26.6 (79.9)	28.3 (82.9)	27.2 (81.0)	25.0 (77.0)	23.9 (75.0)	24.5 (76.1)	24.5 (76.1)	20.7 (69.3)	17.3 (63.1)	23.1 (73.6)
Average rainfall mm (inches)	1.4 (0.06)	2.7 (0.11)	8.1 (0.32)	5.1 (0.20)	25.6 (1.01)	55.7 (2.19)	137.0 (5.39)	184.8 (7.28)	103.2 (4.06)	16.2 (0.64)	1.1 (0.04)	0.4 (0.02)	537.4 (21.16)
Average rainy days (≥ 1.0 mm)	0.19	0.11	0.29	0.50	2.26	5.10	9.44	12.22	7.36	1.81	0.19	0.04	39.22
Mean monthly sunshine hours	279.4	257.8	294.0	280.3	256.1	241.1	256.3	229.5	256.6	292.7	292.0	287.1	3,214.5
Source: Meteo Climat
