= Mopti =

Town in the Inner Niger Delta region of Mali

- Commune and town
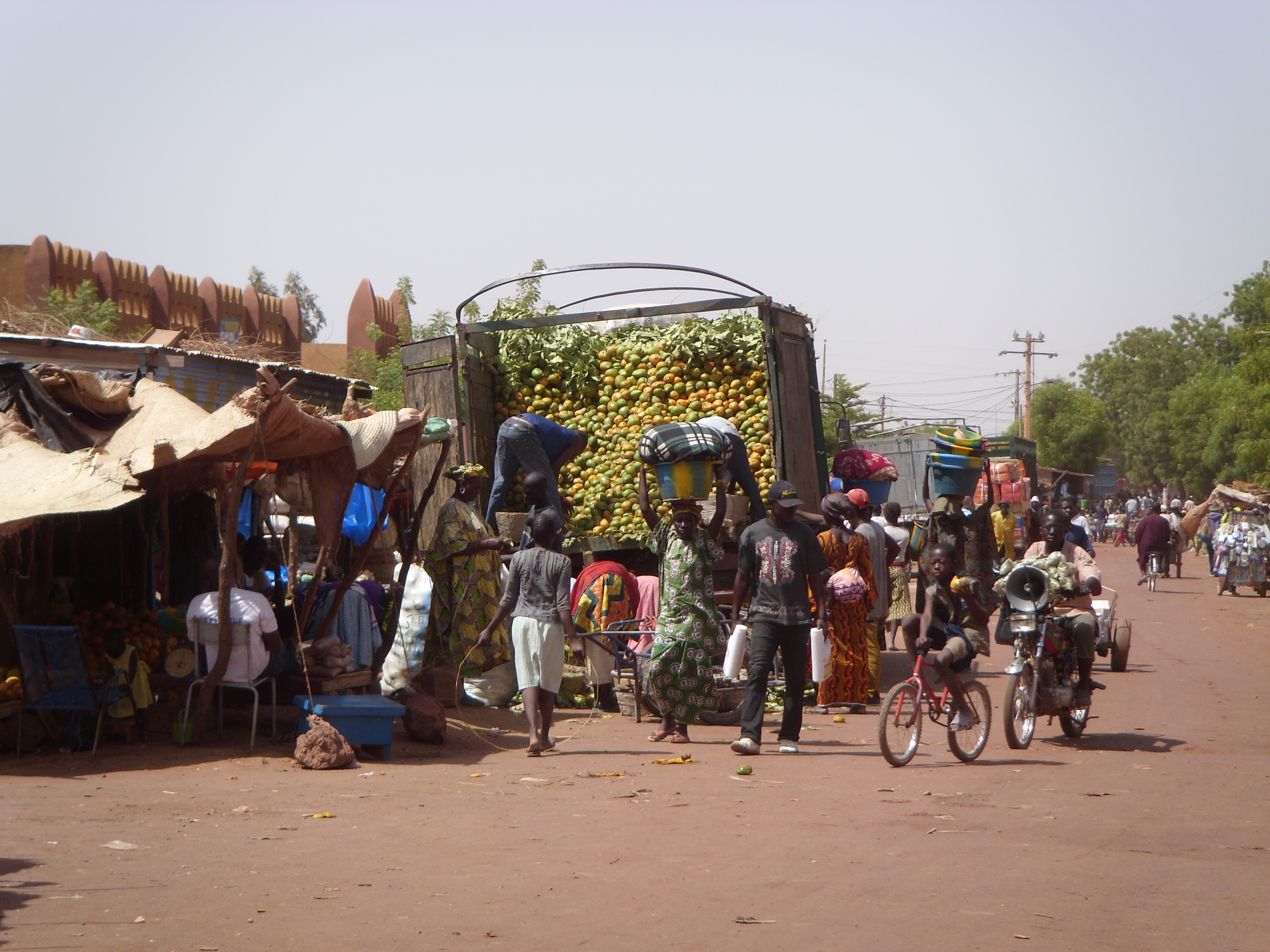
- Mopti Market

- Location within Mali
- Coordinates: 14°29′45″N 4°11′55″W
- Country: Mali
- Regions of Mali: Mopti Region
- Cercle: Mopti Cercle
- Established: early Common Era
- islands: List: New Town; Old Town; Bani

Area
  - Total: 40 km^{2} (15 sq mi)
- Elevation: 268 m (879 ft)

Population (2009)
  - Total: 114,296
  - Density: 2,900/km^{2} (7,400/sq mi)
- Time zone: UTC0 (GMT)

Mopti (Fulfulde: Mobti) is a town and an urban commune in central Mali. Located in the Inner Niger Delta region of the country, the town also serves as the capital of the Mopti Cercle and the Mopti Region. Situated 630 km northeast of Bamako, the town lies at the confluence of the Niger and the Bani Rivers and is linked by an elevated causeway to the town of Sévaré. The urban commune, which includes both Mopti and Sévaré, had a population of 114,296 in the 2009 census.

== Geography ==
Mopti lies on the right bank of the Bani River, a few hundred meters upstream of the confluence of the Bani with the Niger River. Between August and December when the rivers flood the Inner Niger Delta, the town becomes a series of islands connected by raised causeways. During this period the only road access to the town is along a 12 km causeway that links Mopti to Sévaré. Mopti lies to the west of the Dogon Plateau and is 66 km northwest of Bandiagara and 76 km north-northeast of Djenné. The town is the capital of the Mopti Region and the administrative center of the Mopti Cercle.

The urban commune of Mopti includes the towns of both Mopti and Sévaré. The commune is completely surrounded by the rural commune of Socoura. At the time of the 2009 census the population of the Mopti commune was 114,296. For administrative purposes the commune is subdivided into 11 quartiers: Komoguel I, Komoguel II, Gangal, Toguel, Bougoufié, Mossinkoré, Taïkiri, Médina Coura, Sévaré I, Sévaré II, and Sévaré III. The seat of the commune, the Hôtel de Ville de Mopti, is in Komoguel I.

=== Climate ===
Mopti has a hot semi-arid climate (Köppen climate classification BSh). The town lies near the southern boundary of the Sahel region and the weather is hot to sweltering and arid throughout much of the year. Only December and January at the height of the dry season have average daily maximum temperatures below 32.2 °C (90 °F). Average daily maximum temperatures in the hottest months of the year — April and May — exceed 40 °C or 104 °F. Temperatures are slightly cooler, though still very hot, from June through September, when practically all of the annual rainfall occurs.

Climate data for Mopti (1991–2020, extremes 1935–1994)
Month	Jan	Feb	Mar	Apr	May	Jun	Jul	Aug	Sep	Oct	Nov	Dec	Year
Record high °C (°F)	39.2 (102.6)	44.0 (111.2)	44.6 (112.3)	46.2 (115.2)	46.2 (115.2)	45.0 (113.0)	43.2 (109.8)	43.3 (109.9)	42.8 (109.0)	44.4 (111.9)	44.5 (112.1)	39.8 (103.6)	46.2 (115.2)
Mean daily maximum °C (°F)	32.1 (89.8)	35.3 (95.5)	38.7 (101.7)	41.2 (106.2)	41.4 (106.5)	39.0 (102.2)	35.4 (95.7)	32.8 (91.0)	33.9 (93.0)	36.5 (97.7)	36.3 (97.3)	33.3 (91.9)	36.3 (97.3)
Daily mean °C (°F)	23.7 (74.7)	26.8 (80.2)	30.5 (86.9)	33.5 (92.3)	34.5 (94.1)	32.8 (91.0)	29.9 (85.8)	28.1 (82.6)	29.0 (84.2)	30.2 (86.4)	28.1 (82.6)	24.8 (76.6)	29.3 (84.7)
Mean daily minimum °C (°F)	15.4 (59.7)	18.2 (64.8)	22.2 (72.0)	25.8 (78.4)	27.5 (81.5)	26.5 (79.7)	24.3 (75.7)	23.4 (74.1)	24.0 (75.2)	23.8 (74.8)	19.8 (67.6)	16.4 (61.5)	22.3 (72.1)
Record low °C (°F)	6.1 (43.0)	7.2 (45.0)	10.0 (50.0)	13.4 (56.1)	15.8 (60.4)	18.3 (64.9)	17.4 (63.3)	18.0 (64.4)	15.0 (59.0)	14.4 (57.9)	11.9 (53.4)	7.0 (44.6)	6.1 (43.0)
Average precipitation mm (inches)	1.2 (0.05)	0.0 (0.0)	0.9 (0.04)	5.6 (0.22)	16.8 (0.66)	55.9 (2.20)	140.9 (5.55)	188.2 (7.41)	89.8 (3.54)	18.7 (0.74)	1.0 (0.04)	0.0 (0.0)	519 (20.45)
Average precipitation days (≥ 1.0 mm)	0.2	0.1	0.3	1.0	3.0	6.9	12.1	14.6	9.3	2.8	0.2	0.0	50.5
Average relative humidity (%)	24	20	19	21	33	47	62	70	66	49	31	27	39
Mean monthly sunshine hours	272.6	270.0	274.2	254.6	269.2	242.3	244.3	246.2	249.8	278.5	282.0	264.3	3,148
Source 1: World Meteorological Organization
Source 2: NOAA (sun 1961–1990), Deutscher Wetterdienst (extremes and humidity)

== History ==
The town of Mopti derives its name from the Fulfulde word for gathering. The name replaced the earlier Bozo name of Sagan. Unlike towns such as Djenné, Timbuktu and Gao, Mopti was a village until the French conquest at the end of the 19th century and did not play an important role in the history of the region.

In April 1828 the French explorer, René Caillié, stopped at Mopti on his journey by boat from Djenné to Timbuktu. In his account he described the village, which he called Isaca, as having 700–800 inhabitants with the houses constructed of sun-dried mud bricks. The inhabitants grew rice on the floodplains, herded livestock and fished with cotton nets. Large quantities of the dried fish were traded in Djenné and other markets. The women made a "beautiful kind of pottery" which they sold in Djenné and to boats heading for Timbuktu. Two centuries later, the cultivation of rice is still very important to the local economy, dried fish are exported over a large part of West Africa and pottery is still shipped from the port.

At the time of Caillié's visit the village was part of the Massina Empire, controlled by Seku Amadu from his base at Hamdullahi, 21 km to the southeast. In 1862 Umar Tall captured Hamdullahi and for a short period the village became part of the Toucouleur Empire. In 1893 French forces under Louis Archinard occupied the region which then became part of the French Sudan.

At the time of the French conquest, Mopti consisted of several separate settlements on small areas of higher ground that remained above the water during the annual flood. French soldiers exploring the Niger on gunboats described Mopti as consisting of a pair villages on the bank of the river 2 km apart with a third village slightly inland.

According to the French colonial army officer, Capitaine Lucien Marc, in 1902 Mopti was a "miserable village" with a few huts. Between 1905 and 1912 the French colonial forces constructed a 12 km dyke connecting Mopti with Sévaré to allow access to the town by road when the Niger was in flood. The village expanded rapidly in the first decade of the 20th century, and by the 1930s the commercial area on the river and the Komoguel district had been developed. The French colonial administration initiated the rebuilding of the great mosque in 1933, basing the design on that of the Great Mosque of Djenné.

Due to the limited land available, Mopti became more densely built than most Malian cities with many multi-story buildings and narrow streets. Originally, the islands were much smaller than they are today; first linked by dykes in the early twentieth century, the areas around and between natural islands have been gradually filled and raised—often by deposition of household trash, a process that still continues today in areas such as the western edge of the Old Town.

In 2002, Mopti was one of several Malian cities to host the Cup of African Nations tournament. A large, modern stadium was constructed for this event.

During the Tuareg rebellion, when Islamists for a time took over most of Northern Mali, Mopti was one of the most northerly towns that remained under government control.

Amadou Toumani Touré, a former president of Mali, is a native of Mopti.

== Mosque ==
The Great Mosque (also called the Komoguel Mosque) is an example of Sudano-Sahelian architecture. The present building was constructed on the site of an earlier mosque dating from 1908 but sources differ on the exact date. The web site of the UNESCO World Heritage Convention gives a period of between 1933 and 1935 while the Aga Khan Development Network gives the slightly later period of between 1936 and 1943. The design was based on that of the Great Mosque of Djenné and is constructed using sun-dried mud bricks which are covered with a layer of banco. In restoration work carried out in 1978, the upper parts of the building were covered with a layer of cement but this later proved to be problematic as rain water penetrated the cement layer and created large fissures in the underlying mud structure. In the restoration carried out between 2004 and 2006 funded by the Aga Khan Trust for Culture, the cement layer was removed and the building restored to its original form. The mosque was added to the UNESCO Tentative List of World Heritage Sites in March 2009.

== Industry ==
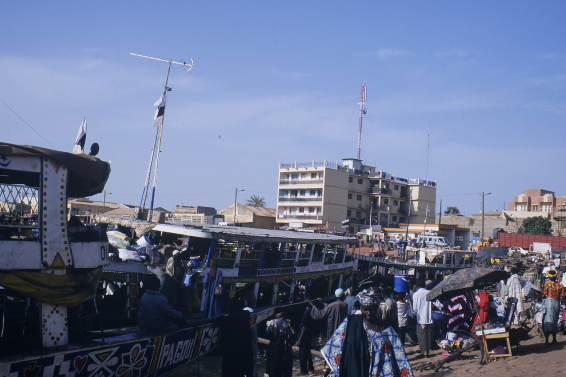
Port of Mopti

Mopti is the region's commercial center and Mali's most important port; markets around its harbour sell rock salt from Taoudenni, among many other goods. Fishing, herding, and agriculture (particularly rice production) also continue to be important to the local economy.

=== Tourism ===
Mopti is popular with tourists, having an active river port, a mosque, and across the Niger, small fishing villages. Attractions in Mopti include Mopti Grand Mosque and the nearby Pays Dogon. There are several popular hotels, the Hotel Kanaga, Hotel Y a pas de Problème, and Hotel Ambedjele which is on the road to Sévaré.

During the Mali war, most Western tourists stayed away from the region, even though Mopti was not in rebel hands. However, the conflict had a mixed effect on the town as dispossessed people from the rebel-held area came to Mopti and boosted some parts of the economy.

== Transport ==
The port of Mopti is served by ferries operated by the Compagnie Malienne de Navigation (COMANAV). The ferries run between August and December when the depth of water in the river is sufficient. They carry both freight and passengers between Koulikoro (59 km downstream from Bamako) and Gao, a distance of 1308 km. Both passengers and freight are also transported by pinasses, large wooden canoe shaped vessels, that are privately operated.

Mopti is connected by a 12 km elevated causeway to Sévaré which lies on the Route Nationale 16 (RN16), the bitumen surfaced road that links Bamako in the west to Gao in the east. Moreover, Mopti is served by an airport located in Sévaré.

== Culture ==
The city is the subject of a 1999 documentary film, L'Esprit de Mopti. It is also the birthplace of Slovak celebrity Ibrahim Maiga.

== Demographics ==
Niger River at Mopti
- Average monthly flow (m^{3}/s) at the Mopti hydrometric station over the period 1922–1990

Many ethnic groups are present in the commune including Fula, Bozo, Bambara, Dogon, Songhai, Bobos and Mossis. The most spoken language is Fula followed by Bozo.

== Twin towns – sister cities ==
Mopti is twinned with:

- Mortagne-au-Perche, France since 1975

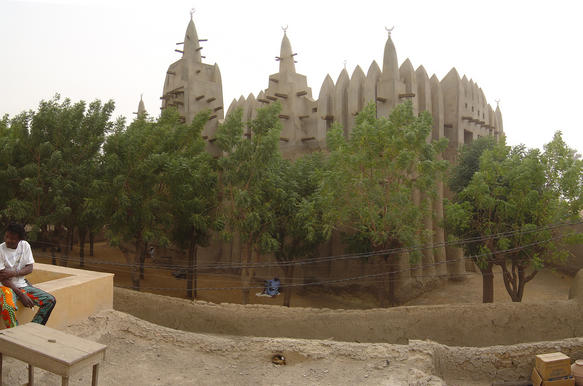
Mopti Grand Mosque

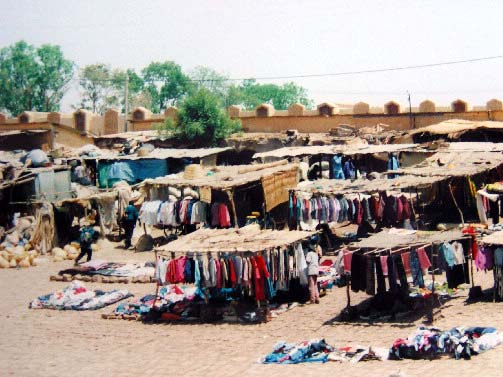
Market scene

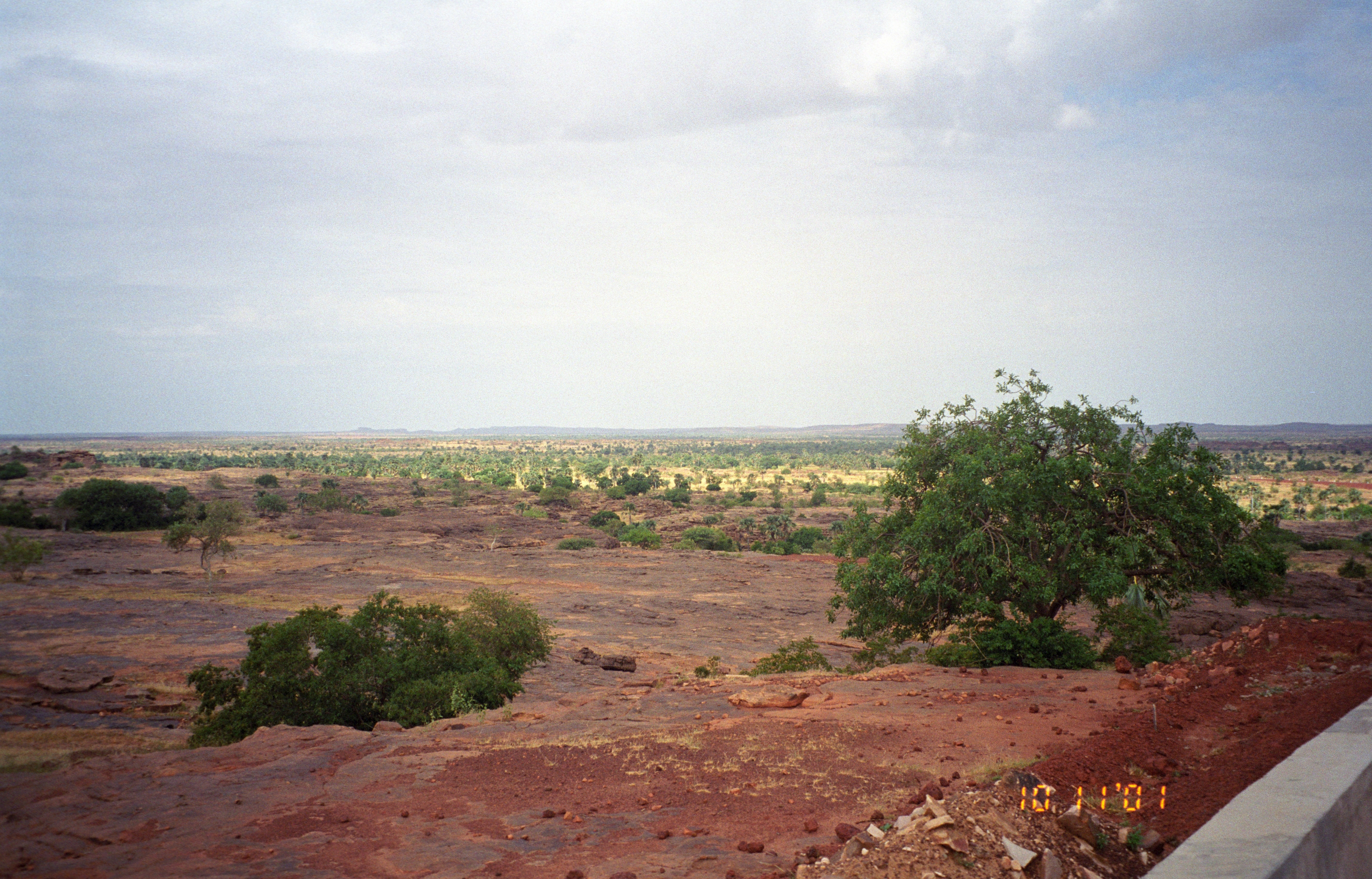
Countryside near Sévaré in the commune of Mopti

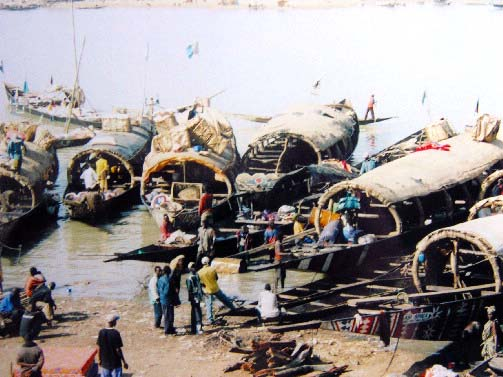
Boats in the harbour

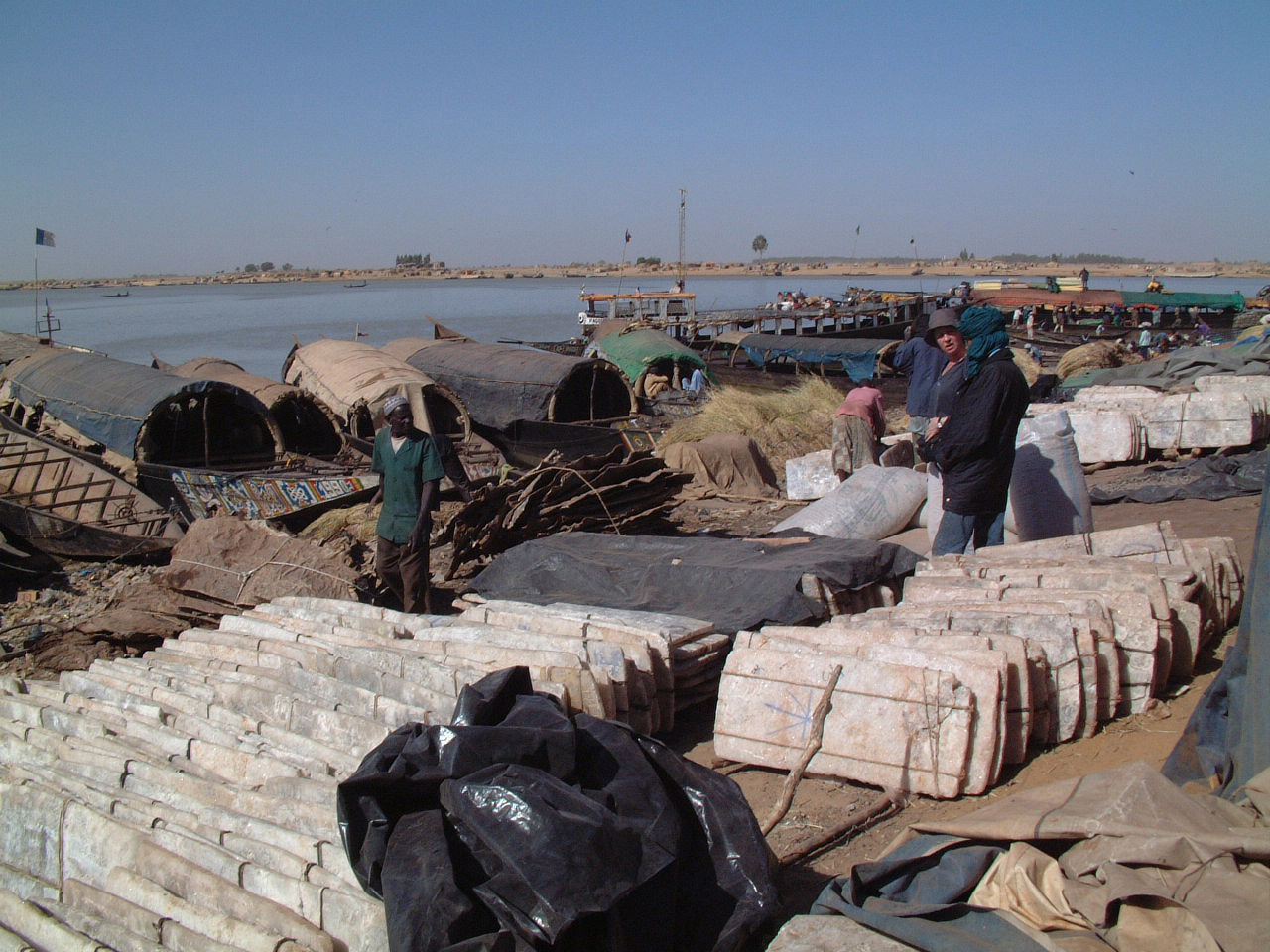
Unloading rock salt from Taoudenni

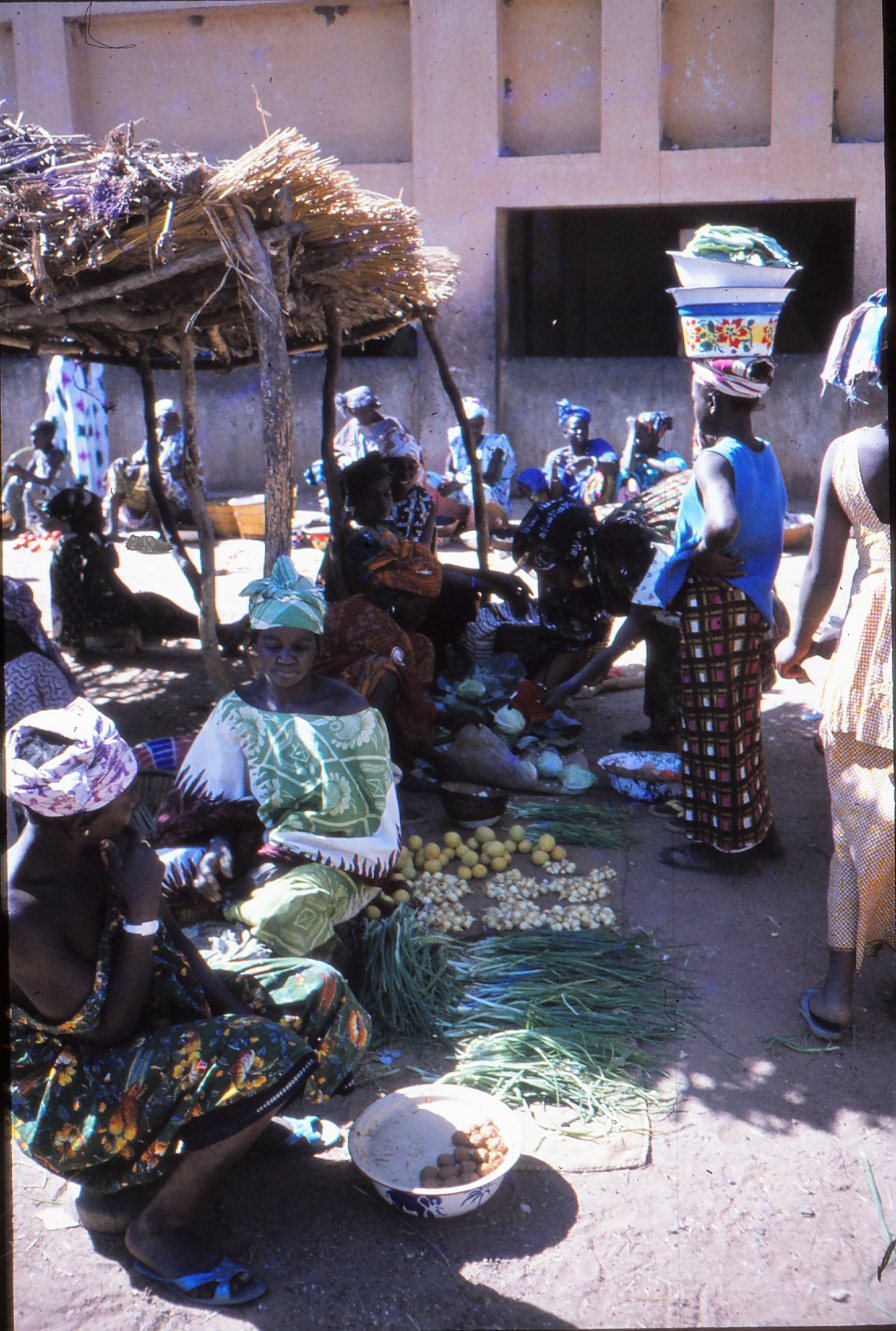
Women selling onions and cabbages at the Mopti market, 1992

== See also ==
- List of cities in Mali
- St. Joseph Cathedral, Mopti
