= Mopti Cercle =

Coordinates: 14°40′N 4°05′W

- Cercle
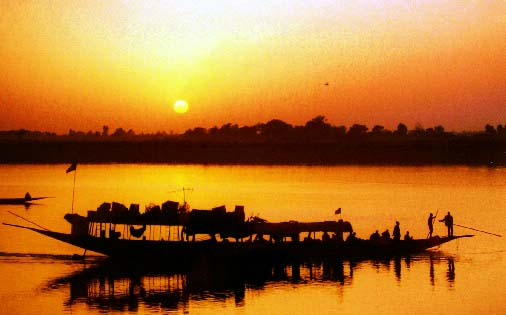

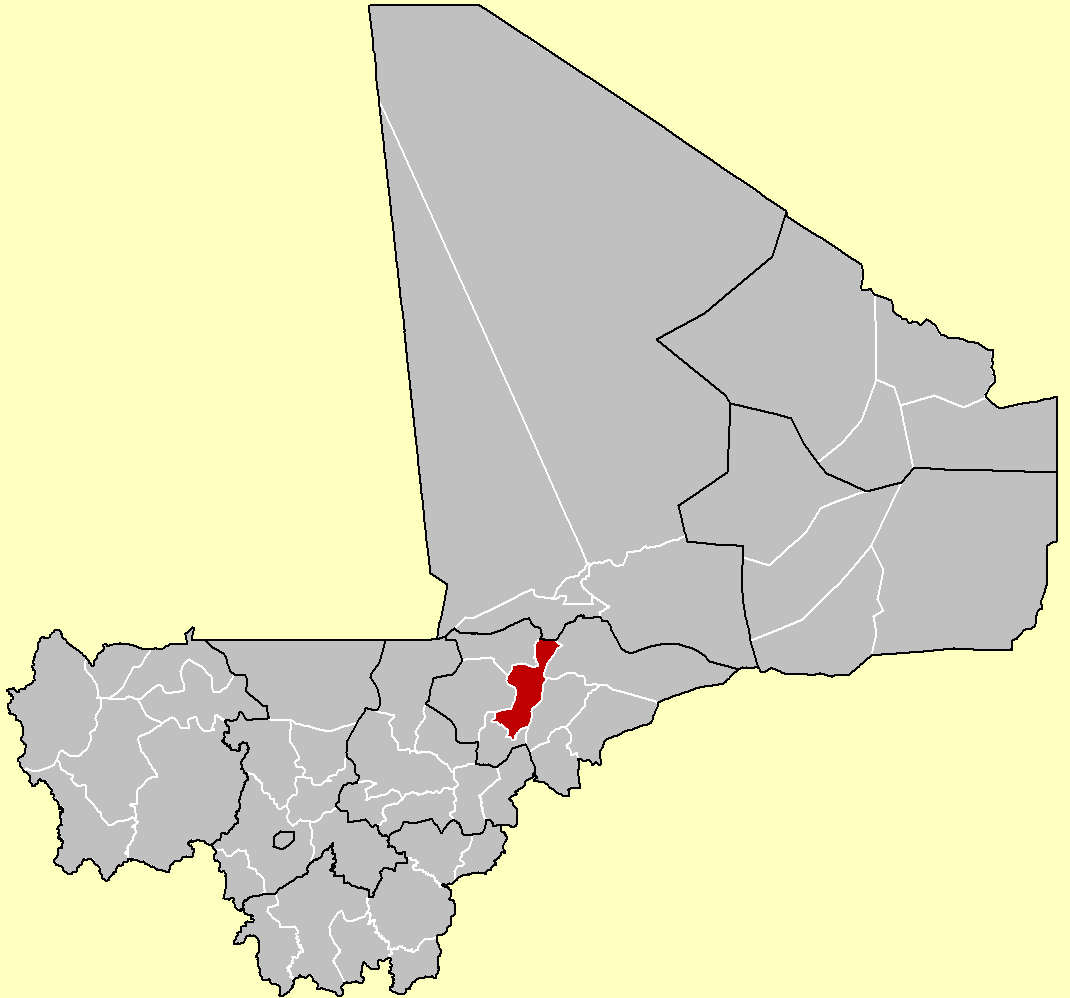
- Location of the Cercle of Mopti in Mali
- Country: Mali
- Region: Mopti Region
- Admin HQ (chef-lieu): Mopti

Area
  - Total: 7,262 km^{2} (2,804 sq mi)

Population (2009 census)
  - Total: 368,512
  - Density: 50.75/km^{2} (131.4/sq mi)
- Time zone: UTC+0 (GMT)

Mopti Cercle is an administrative subdivision of the Mopti Region of Mali. The administrative center (chef-lieu) is the town of Mopti.

The cercle is divided into 15 communes:

- Bassirou
- Borondougou
- Dialloubé
- Fatoma
- Konna
- Korombana
- Koubaye
- Kounari
- Mopti
- Ouro Modi
- Ouroubé Douddé
- Sasalbé
- Sio
- Socoura
- Soye
